= 2025 Vesthimmerland municipal election (Denmark) =

Municipal election in Denmark

← 2021	18 November 2025	2029 →

All 27 seats to the Vesthimmerland municipal council 14 seats needed for a majority
- Turnout: 19,688 (68.7%) ▲1.7%
	First party	Second party	Third party
	V	C	A
Party	Venstre	Conservatives	Social Democrats
Last election	9 seats, 31.8%	7 seats, 23.9%	5 seats, 17.9%
Seats won	10	7	5
Seat change	▲1	0	0
Popular vote	6,141	4,687	3,221
Percentage	31.6%	24.1%	16.6%
Swing	▼0.1%	▲0.3%	▼1.3%
	Fourth party	Fifth party	Sixth party
	Æ	F	O
Party	Denmark Democrats	Green Left	Danish People's Party
Last election	Did not stand	3 seats, 11.9%	1 seat, 3.5%
Seats won	3	2	0
Seat change	▲3	▼1	▼1
Popular vote	2,438	1,433	450
Percentage	12.6%	7.4%	2.3%
Swing	New	▼4.5%	▼1.1%
Mayor before election
Per Bach Laursen
Venstre
Mayor after election
Per Bach Laursen
Venstre

The 2025 Vesthimmerland Municipal election was held on November 18, 2025, to elect the 27 members to sit in the regional council for the Vesthimmerland Municipal council, in the period of 2026 to 2029. Per Bach Laursen would win the mayoral position again.

== Background ==
Following the 2021 election, Per Bach Laursen from Venstre, became mayor for his second consecutive term. In March 2025, it was revealed that Bach Laursen would be the mayoral candidate from Venstre again in 2025.

== Electoral system ==
For elections to Danish municipalities, a number varying from 9 to 31 are chosen to be elected to the municipal council. The seats are then allocated using the D'Hondt method and a closed list proportional representation. Vesthimmerland Municipality had 27 seats in 2025.

Unlike in Danish General Elections, in elections to municipal councils, electoral alliances are allowed.

== Electoral alliances ==
=== Electoral Alliance 1 ===
Party		Political alignment
A	Social Democrats	Centre-left
F	Green Left	Centre-left to Left-wing

=== Electoral Alliance 2 ===
Party		Political alignment
C	Conservatives	Centre-right
I	Liberal Alliance	Centre-right to Right-wing
K	Christian Democrats	Centre to Centre-right
V	Venstre	Centre-right
Æ	Denmark Democrats	Right-wing to Far-right

== Results by polling station ==
Division	A	B	C	F	I	K	L	O	V	Æ
Division	%	%	%	%	%	%	%	%	%	%
Aalestrup	14.3	0.8	29.2	4.8	2.0	0.3	0.4	2.2	30.6	15.5
Farsø	18.1	2.5	24.7	5.2	3.2	0.7	0.4	2.2	30.2	13.1
Strandbyhallen	18.3	6.4	16.9	7.1	1.8	0.9	1.1	2.1	26.7	18.7
Aars	17.9	1.1	34.4	6.6	2.0	0.3	0.6	1.7	28.2	7.1
Hvalpsund	15.5	4.8	12.7	5.3	4.3	0.3	0.9	2.8	41.2	12.3
Gislum-Vognsild	25.7	0.9	16.4	4.6	2.5	1.4	0.4	3.6	30.1	14.4
Gedsted	10.5	0.9	7.2	6.4	1.7	0.4	0.9	3.8	54.5	13.7
Hornum-Ulstrup	12.0	1.5	42.3	5.2	3.6	0.3	0.5	2.4	16.8	15.3
Vester Hornum	15.7	6.0	24.1	5.9	4.6	1.5	0.9	2.4	19.7	19.2
Løgstør	16.4	1.3	17.3	9.1	0.9	0.4	0.5	2.5	39.8	11.7
Ranum	14.6	2.7	9.3	29.2	3.3	2.8	1.4	1.9	17.2	17.7
Salling	12.0	0.2	12.3	9.2	2.8	1.4	0.8	3.6	35.0	22.7
Overlade	8.9	0.8	7.5	8.3	1.9	1.9	0.6	2.3	51.2	16.6
Skivum-Giver	35.6	2.3	17.7	4.3	2.5	0.2	0.5	2.5	19.3	15.2

== Results ==
Party		Votes	%	+/-	Seats	+/-
Vesthimmerland Municipality
V	Venstre	6,141	31.64	-0.13	10	+1
C	Conservatives	4,687	24.15	+0.29	7	0
A	Social Democrats	3,221	16.60	-1.30	5	0
Æ	Denmark Democrats	2,438	12.56	New	3	New
F	Green Left	1,433	7.38	-4.52	2	-1
I	Liberal Alliance	456	2.35	New	0	New
O	Danish People's Party	450	2.32	-1.14	0	-1
B	Social Liberals	342	1.76	-0.26	0	0
K	Christian Democrats	125	0.64	+0.07	0	0
L	Borgerlisten	116	0.60	New	0	New
Total		19,409	100	N/A	27	N/A
Invalid votes		63	0.22	+0.09		
Blank votes		216	0.75	+0.13		
Turnout		19,688	68.73	+1.66		
Source: valg.dk

== Opinion polls ==
Polling firm	Fieldwork date	Sample size	V	C	A	F	O	B	K	I	L	Æ	Others	Lead
Epinion	4 Sep - 13 Oct 2025	479	27.0	13.7	24.0	10.4	5.5	0.4	–	4.4	–	13.4	1.1	3.0
2024 european parliament election	9 Jun 2024		28.3	6.1	14.2	9.5	7.0	3.0	–	4.9	–	20.2	–	8.1
2022 general election	1 Nov 2022		17.6	5.4	27.9	7.7	2.3	1.2	0.4	5.0	–	21.0	–	6.9
2021 regional election	16 Nov 2021		25.0	28.0	22.8	5.5	4.3	4.8	1.2	0.5	–	–	–	3.0
2021 municipal election	16 Nov 2021		31.8 (9)	23.9 (7)	17.9 (5)	11.9 (3)	3.5 (1)	2.0 (0)	0.6 (0)	–	–	–	–	7.9
