= 2021 Vesthimmerland municipal election (Denmark) =

← 2017	16 November 2021	2025 →

All 27 seats to the Vesthimmerland Municipal Council 14 seats needed for a majority
- Turnout: 19,431 (67.1%) ▼5.2pp
	First party	Second party	Third party
	V	C	A
Party	Venstre	Conservatives	Social Democrats
Last election	8 seats, 24.6%	7 seats, 25.9%	7 seats, 22.3%
Seats won	9	7	5
Seat change	▲1	0	▼2
Popular vote	6,105	4,585	3,439
Percentage	31.8%	23.9%	17.9%
Swing	▲7.2%	▼2.0%	▼4.4%
	Fourth party	Fifth party	Sixth party
	F	O	L
Party	Green Left	Danish People's Party	Vesthimmerlandslisten
Last election	2 seats, 9.1%	2 seats, 8.2%	1 seat, 5.6%
Seats won	3	1	1
Seat change	▲1	▼1	0
Popular vote	2,288	664	653
Percentage	11.9%	3.5%	3.4%
Swing	▲2.8%	▼4.7%	▼2.2%
	Seventh party
	D
Party	The New Right
Last election	Did not stand
Seats won	1
Seat change	▲1
Popular vote	651
Percentage	3.4
Swing	New
Mayor before election
Per Bach Laursen
Venstre
Mayor after election
Per Bach Laursen
Venstre

Per Bach Laursen was seeking a second term, after winning the mayor's position following the election in 2017.

In this election, Venstre won 9 seats, and increased their vote share by 7.2 points, The Conservatives, who had held the mayor's position from 2014 to 2017, decreased their vote share by 2.0 points. As the traditional blue bloc now had 18 of the 27 seats, Venstre was in pole position to secure the mayoralty. Following the election night a constitution was agreed on that would see Per Bach Laursen as mayor for a second term.

== Electoral system ==
For elections to Danish municipalities, a number varying from 9 to 31 are chosen to be elected to the municipal council. The seats are then allocated using the D'Hondt method and a closed list proportional representation. Vesthimmerland Municipality had 27 seats in 2021

Unlike in Danish general elections, in elections to municipal councils, electoral alliances are allowed.

== Electoral alliances ==
=== Electoral Alliance 1 ===
Party		Political alignment
A	Social Democrats	Centre-left
F	Green Left	Centre-left to Left-wing

=== Electoral Alliance 2 ===
Party		Political alignment
B	Social Liberals	Centre to Centre-left
Ø	Red–Green Alliance	Left-wing to Far-Left

=== Electoral Alliance 3 ===
Party		Political alignment
C	Conservatives	Centre-right
D	New Right	Right-wing to Far-right
K	Christian Democrats	Centre to Centre-right
L	VesthimmerlandsListen	Local politics
O	Danish People's Party	Right-wing to Far-right
V	Venstre	Centre-right

== Results by polling station ==
Polling Station	A	B	C	D	F	K	O	V	Ø	Others
Polling Station	%	%	%	%	%	%	%	%	%	%
Aalestrup	18.9	1.3	32.6	3.6	5.1	0.4	2.8	33.7	0.3	1.3
Farsø	14.9	2.7	21.9	3.6	9.8	0.7	3.2	29.6	1.2	12.3
Strandby	13.4	5.2	18.4	5.6	10.1	0.7	4.9	30.0	2.0	9.6
Aars	18.8	2.5	35.2	2.5	9.3	0.4	2.3	25.4	0.7	2.8
Hvalpsund	15.4	1.9	11.4	5.1	9.8	0.8	2.1	44.6	2.9	6.0
Gislum-Vognsild	29.0	1.7	20.4	2.4	7.8	0.5	3.0	31.3	1.0	2.8
Gedsted	32.1	1.3	15.5	5.0	8.8	0.3	5.0	28.5	2.1	1.4
Hornum-Ulstrup	12.8	1.4	39.6	3.8	10.1	0.3	4.7	24.1	1.2	1.9
Vester Hornum	12.0	1.7	26.1	3.3	9.6	1.2	4.5	35.9	1.6	4.0
Løgstør	17.6	1.5	12.2	2.7	20.0	0.3	5.3	38.0	1.0	1.4
Ranum	11.7	2.5	10.6	3.2	30.1	1.5	3.9	29.1	5.3	2.1
Salling	13.4	0.6	13.1	4.7	18.6	0.8	5.3	40.3	1.4	1.8
Overlade	10.0	1.2	7.3	3.1	14.4	0.4	2.5	57.7	0.4	3.1
Skivum-Giver	34.2	2.2	16.4	5.2	8.0	1.3	2.2	27.7	1.1	1.7

== Results ==
Party		Votes	%	+/-	Seats	+/-
Vesthimmerland Municipality
V	Venstre	6,105	31.77	+7.18	9	+1
C	Conservatives	4,585	23.86	-2.02	7	0
A	Social Democrats	3,439	17.90	-4.42	5	-2
F	Green Left	2,288	11.91	+2.77	3	+1
O	Danish People's Party	664	3.46	-4.72	1	-1
L	VesthimmerlandsListen	653	3.40	-2.23	1	0
D	New Right	651	3.39	New	1	New
B	Social Liberals	388	2.02	-0.98	0	0
Ø	Red-Green Alliance	244	1.27	New	0	New
K	Christian Democrats	111	0.58	New	0	New
Z	Progress Party	88	0.46	New	0	New
Total		19,216	100	N/A	27	N/A
Invalid votes		39	0.13	-0.08		
Blank votes		176	0.61	+0.04		
Turnout		19,431	67.07	-5.22		
Source: valg.dk
