= Hvorvarp =

- Town
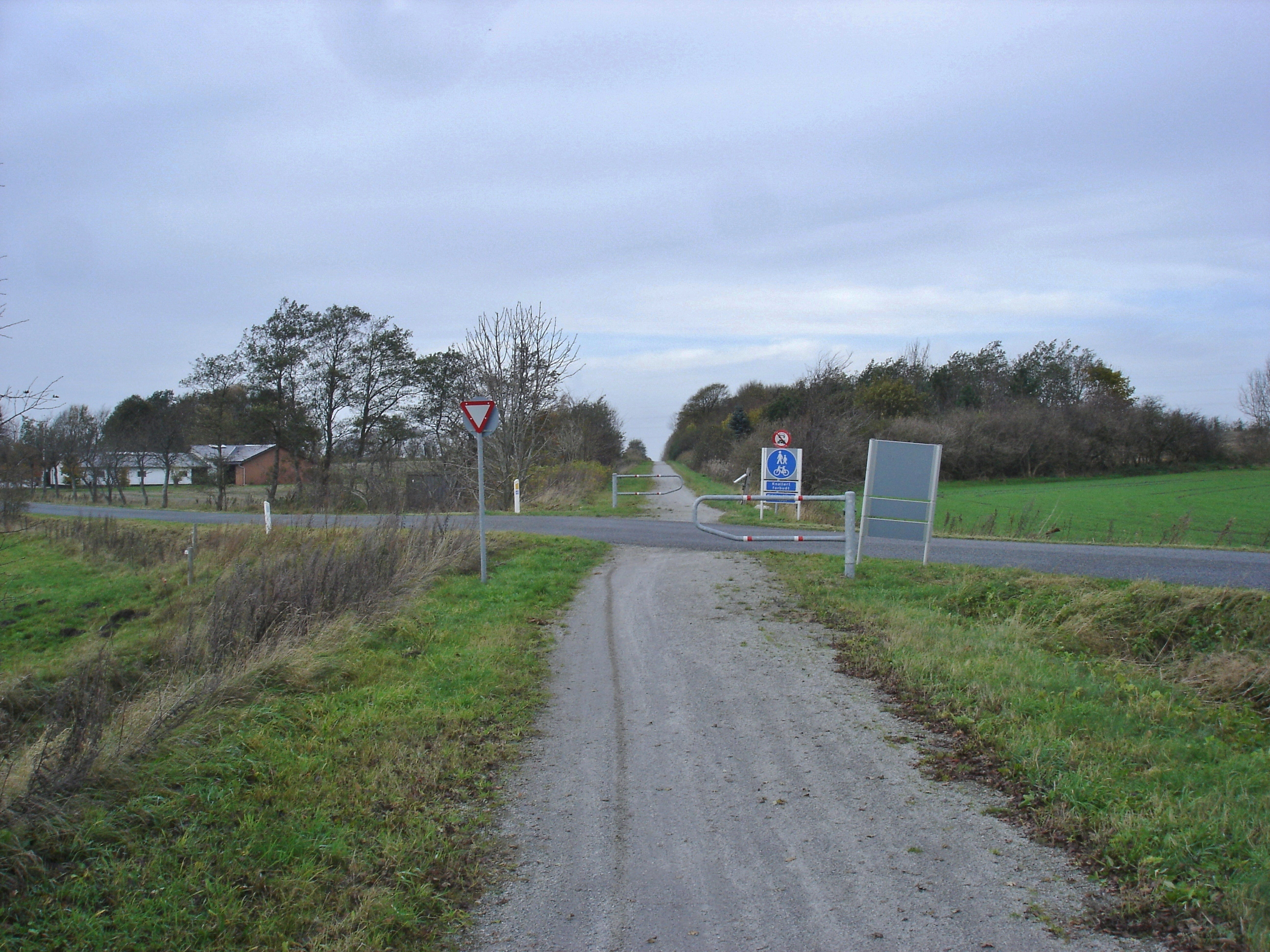

- Location in Denmark
- Coordinates: 56°49′28.4″N 9°27′22.4″E
- Country: Denmark
- Region: Region Nordjylland
- Municipality: Vesthimmerland

Population
  - Total: ?
- Time zone: UTC+1 (CET)
  - Summer (DST): UTC+1 (CEST)
- Postal code: 9600

Hvorvarp is a settlement in Vesthimmerland located between Aars and Hornum in Ulstrup Sogn, Denmark.

The development is centered at intersections of roads Hvorvarpvej, Jelstrupvej & Foldgangsvej (Vej means road). Himmerlandsstien passes and crosses Hvorvarpvej & Foldgangsvej. Himmerland railroad nearest stations to Hvorvarp have been either Hornum Station or Aars Station. In Hvorvarp lies crafts company Tømrer-& Snedkerforretning ApS A clothing store named Brudesalonen that closed in 2012 it was on Jelstrupvej.

Featuring a peasant family from Hvorvarp mentioned in Johannes V. Jensens Himmerland History girl from Hvorhvarp.
