= Aars Municipality =

Coordinates: 56.804489°N 9.510164°E

Aars Municipality Aars Kommune
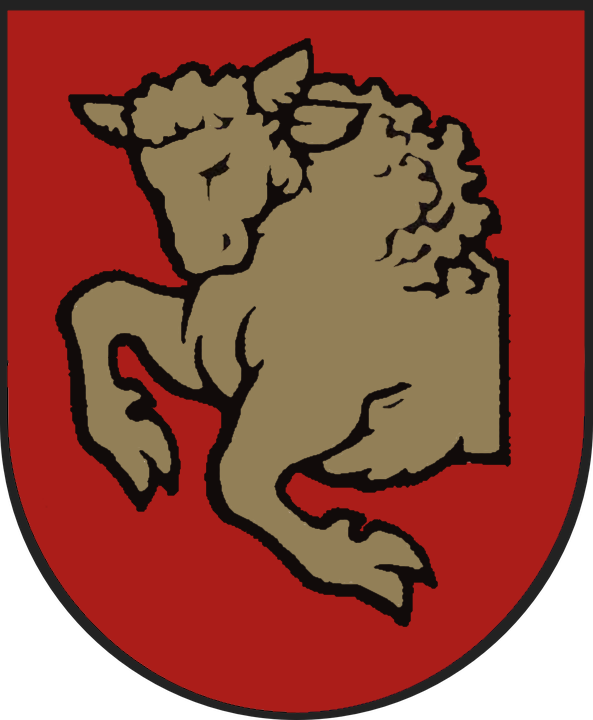
- Coat of arms

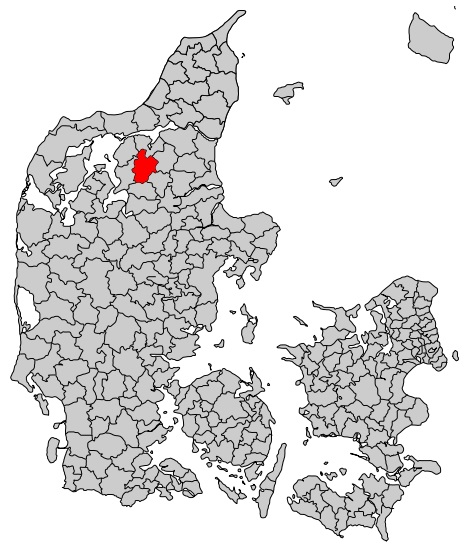
- Aars Municipality's location in Denmark, 1970–2007.
- Country: Denmark
- Region: Region of North Jutland
- Established: 1970
- Seat: Aars

Area
  - Total: 223 km^{2} (86 sq mi)

Population (2005)
  - Total: 13,284
  - Density: 59.6/km^{2} (154/sq mi)
- Time zone: UTC1 (CET)
  - Summer (DST): CEST

Aars Municipality was a municipality (Danish, kommune) in northern Denmark, in the county of North Jutland on the peninsula of Jutland. It was established as a result of the 1970 Danish Municipal Reform and ceased to exist following the Municipal reform of 2007. Today, the region is located within Vesthimmerland Municipality.

== History ==
The municipality was established by the 1970 reforms which grouped parishes into municipalities. Aars municipality was made up of the parishes of: Blære, Gislum, Giver, Gundersted, Havbro, Skivum, Ulstrup, Vognsild, and Aars parish.

By 2005, the municipality covered an area of 223 km^{2} and had a total population of 13,284. Its final mayor was Knud V. Christensen, a member of the Conservative People's Party. On 1 January 2007 Aars municipality ceased to exist and was merged with the former Farsø, Løgstør, and Aalestrup municipalities to form the new Vesthimmerland Municipality, with an area of 815 km^{2} and a total population of 39,176 (2005).

== Mayors ==
- Holger Mikkelsen, 1970–1971 (Venstre)
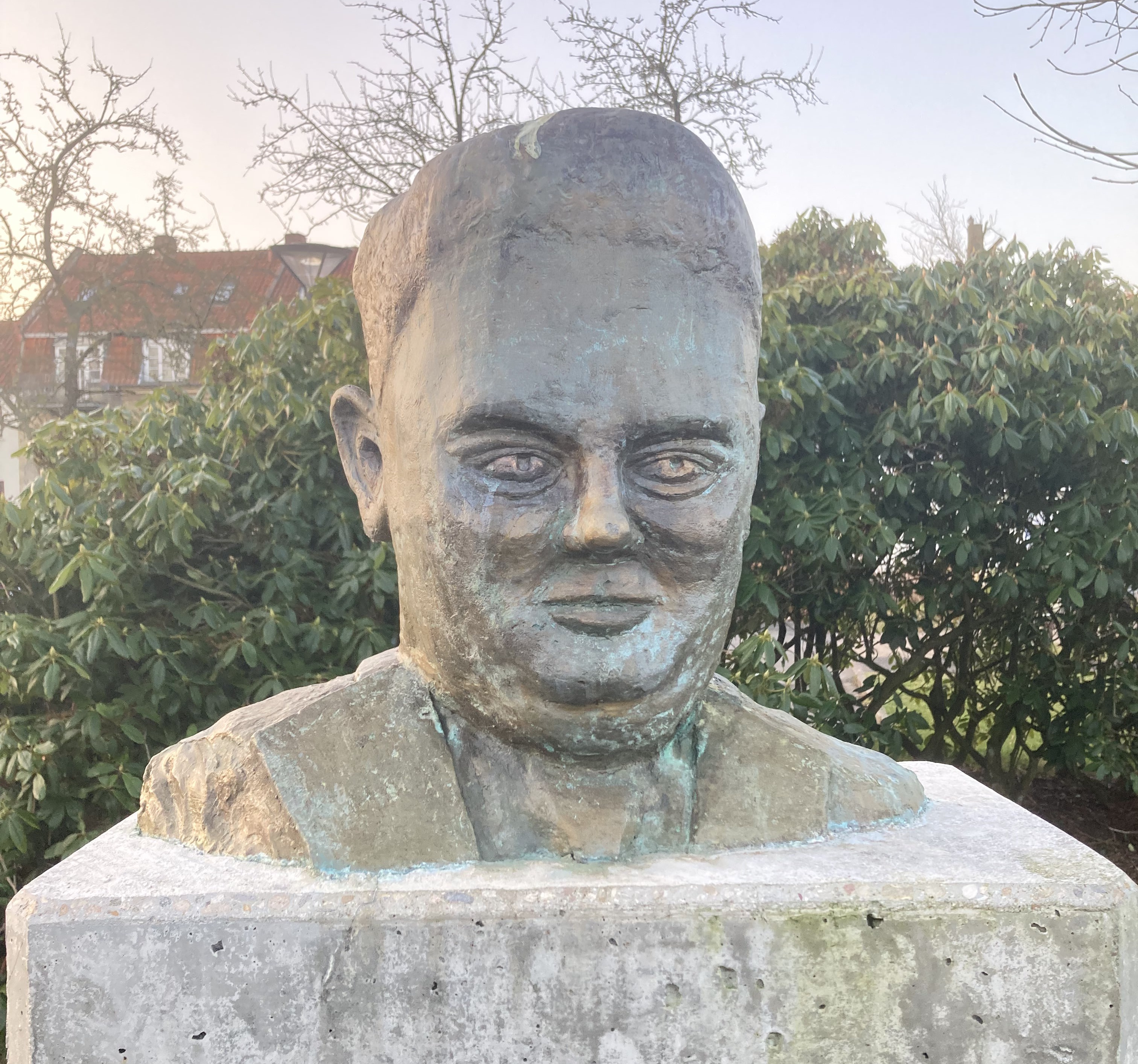
  Bust of Holger Mikkelsen, the first mayor of Aars.
- Niels Nystrup Haugård, 1971–1974 (Venstre)
- Alfred Rask, 1974–1982 (Venstre)
- Martin Glerup, 1982–1986 (Socialdemokratiet)
- Ejvind Nielsen, 1986–1990 (Venstre)
- Per Nørgaard, 1990–2002 (Venstre)
- Knud Vældgaard Kristensen, 2002–2007 (Det Konservative Folkeparti)

== Twin cities ==
- (Sweden) Kopparberg
