= Gedsted =

- Town
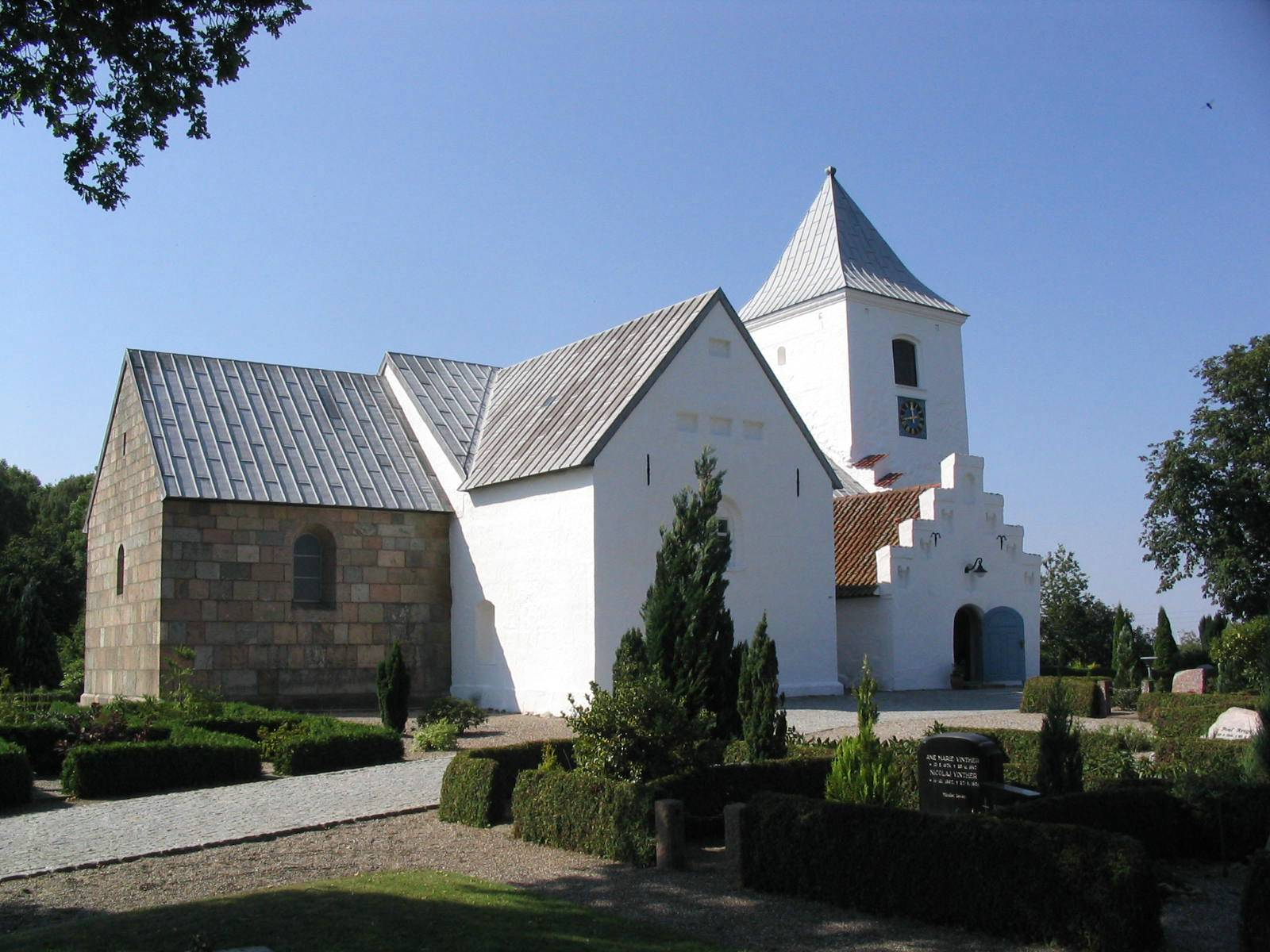
- Gedsted church

- Location in North Denmark Region Gedsted (Denmark)
- Coordinates: 56.68970°N 9.33454°E
- Country: Denmark
- Region: North Denmark (Nordjylland)
- Municipality: Vesthimmerland

Population (2026)
  - Total: 863
- Time zone: UTC+1 (Central Europe Time)
  - Summer (DST): UTC+2
- Postal code: 9631

Gedsted is a small town in Himmerland with a population of 863 (1 January 2026), located in Gedsted parish. The town belongs to the municipality of Vesthimmerland Municipality and is located in the North Denmark Region. The town is located on a hillside near Louns Bredning around 10 km south of Farsø. Gedsted's annual town party is organized by the Cooperative Associations and is called "Gedeskæg". The town also have a school Gedsted school.

== History ==
Gedsted has played a role as a traffic hub from the Viking Age. Probably there has been a bridge over Lerkenfeld stream already from the year 1000-1100. It is said that Canute IV of Denmark also known as Canute the holy, in about 1090, tried to gather a viking army to regain England, and to raise money, he raised the kingdom and collected taxes from the peasants.

When the king stayed at Børglum, the first peasant revolt in Denmark arose, and he had to flee via Aggersborg across Aggersund and further south. It is believed that there was again a battle with the farmer's army at Hødalen just south of Gedsted and again at Viborg.

The first time that Gedsted was mentioned directly in written sources is probably in 1289. Then 15-year-old Erik Menved and his mother, widower, Agnes, made a stay at Vitskøl Kloster held on King's farm "Holmmark". Erik issued a letter that took Vitskøl monastery under royal protection. The letter ended with "Givet på min gård" Hollummark "in Geedstath, 1 March 1289".

Also several letters from Margaret I of Denmark in the 1400s were written from the farm in Holmmark.

Through centuries, the people in Gedsted had been engaged in fishing and agriculture, and in the 1800s, the city was together with Farsø and Skals the three power plants in the region - Aalestrup was first constructed as a city around the turn of the century after the railway was placed here and not at Gedsted .

The company Getama has been a dynamo in the recent development of the city, and in this case, it was close to raw materials in nature, which for many years created the foundation for a sustainable nutrition for hundreds of families.

The cycling factory Jyden was founded in Gedsted, in 1896, in a factory building just opposite the dairy. Three years later, the factory burned to the ground and the production was moved to Aalestrup.

In 1875, the city is described as "Gjedsted med Kirke, Præstegaard og Skole". [2]

About the turn of the century, the city is described as follows: "Gedsted (1289: Geetsteth, 1307: Gettstæthæ) with Church, Præstegd., School, Missionshus (1896), Assembly House (1885), Afholdshjem (1900), Housing, Sparekasse Orig. 22/5 1898; 31/3 1899 was Spar. Commodity 17,765 Kr., Interest rate 4 pct., No. of Accounts 57), Grocery store, Tang-Madrasfabrik, Coloring, Share Dairy, Inn, Fanum, State Telephony and Postal Expedition " [3].

Johannes V. Jensen has also helped put Gedsted on the world map with his history of Himmerland. Here it is narrative how an English circus traveled through Gedsted in the early 1900s and was exposed to the local peoples' ability.

Gedsted Church's history is well described. It was built in the 11th century and was presumably consecrated to Sanctuary Ursula, and in a cavity in the altar there is also a small pencil with a bone blunt, which should originate from one of Saint Ursula's 10,000 virgins.
