= 2021 Danish local elections =

- 16 November 2021
- 98 municipal councils 5 regional councils
Party	Leader	Vote %	Seats	+/–
Social Democrats	Mette Frederiksen	28.4	755	−87
Venstre	Jakob Ellemann-Jensen	21.2	620	−68
Conservatives	Søren Pape Poulsen	15.2	404	+179
SF	Pia Olsen Dyhr	7.6	168	+42
Red–Green	Mai Villadsen (Note: political spokesperson)	7.3	114	+12
Social Liberals	Sofie Carsten Nielsen	5.6	94	+14
DPP	Kristian Thulesen Dahl	4.1	90	−131
New Right	Pernille Vermund	3.6	65	+64
KD	Isabella Arendt	0.8	11	+2
Schleswig Party	Carsten Leth Schmidt	0.3	10	0
Liberal Alliance	Alex Vanopslagh	1.4	9	−19
The Alternative	Franciska Rosenkilde	0.7	5	−15
Other		3.9	91	+13
This lists parties that won seats. See the complete results below.

Local elections were held in 2021 for Denmark's 98 municipal councils and five regional councils. All 2,436 seats were contested for the 2022–2025 term of office, together with 205 seats in five regional councils. Frederiksberg Municipality had increased their number of councillors from 25 to 29.

== Results ==
=== Results of regional elections ===
The regions are not municipalities but are financed only through bloc grants.

==== Number of councillors and political parties in the regional councils ====
Party		Seats	Change
A	Social Democrats	64	▼6
V	Venstre	54	0
C	Conservatives	31	▲16
F	Socialist People's Party	14	▼1
Ø	Red-Green Alliance	14	▲2
B	Danish Social Liberal Party	12	▲4
D	The New Right	8	▲8
O	Danish People's Party	6	▼15
K	Christian Democrats	1	0
I	Liberal Alliance	0	▼5
Å	The Alternative	0	▼3
	Others	1	0
Total		205	

==== Old and new chairs of the regional councils ====
In four of the five regions, the incumbent chairman kept the position. However, in the North Denmark Region, an agreement was made between Venstre, the Danish People's Party, New Right and the Conservative People's Party to give the chairmanship to Mads Duedahl of Venstre. This was the first time since the region's establishment in 2007 that the Social Democrats did not win the region's chairmanship.

Regional Council Chairs Outgoing and Incoming
Region	Incumbent Chair	Elected Chair
North Denmark	Ulla Astman	Mads Duedahl
Central Denmark	Anders Kühnau	Anders Kühnau
Southern Denmark	Stephanie Lose	Stephanie Lose
Zealand	Heino Knudsen	Heino Knudsen
Capital	Lars Gaardhøj	Lars Gaardhøj

=== Results of municipal elections ===
Seats for the 98 municipal councils were up for vote.

==== Number of councillors and political parties in the municipal councils ====
The Conservatives had their best local election results since 1985.

Sum of 98 local elections
Party		Share of vote		Seats	
Party		Percent	Change	Number	Change
A	Social Democrats	28.40%	-4.05%	755	▼87
V	Venstre	21.18%	-1.88%	620	▼68
C	Conservatives	15.24%	+6.46%	404	▲179
F	Socialist People's Party	7.61%	+1.91%	168	▲42
Ø	Red-Green Alliance	7.34%	+1.38%	114	▲12
B	Danish Social Liberal Party	5.59%	+0.99%	94	▲14
O	Danish People's Party	4.09%	-4.66%	90	▼133
D	The New Right	3.57%	+2.67%	65	▲64
K	Christian Democrats	0.79%	+0.29%	11	▲2
S	Schleswig Party	0.29%	-0.01%	10	0
I	Liberal Alliance	1.38%	-1.22%	9	▼19
Å	The Alternative	0.71%	-2.29%	5	▼15
G	Vegan Party	0.17%	New	0	New
	Others	3.64%	+0.44%	91	▲13
Total				2,436	4

Local Political Parties in the Municipal Councils
Party	Municipality	Seats
Tønder Listen (Tønder Listen)	Tønder	9
Gulborgsund List (Guldborgsundlisten)	Guldborgsund	7
New Egedal Local List (Lokallisten Ny Egedal)	Egedal	4
New Gribskov (Nytgribskov)	Gribskov	4
Nyt Odsherred (Nyt Odsherred)	Odsherred	4
Social Common List – Rebild (Den Sociale Fællesliste – Rebild)	Rebild	4
Citizen's List (Borgerlisten)	Tønder	3
Cross-political Community (Tværpolitisk Forening)	Dragør	3
Ishøj List (Ishøjlisten)	Ishøj	3
Our Solrød (VoresSolrød)	Solrød	3
ÆrøPlus (ÆrøPlus)	Ærø	3
Bornholm List (Bornholmerlisten)	Bornholm	2
Citizens' List (Borgerlisten)	Herning	2
City List (Bylisten)	Glostrup	2
Common List (Fælleslisten)	Ikast-Brande	2
East Bridge (Østbroen)	Randers	2
Local List (Lokallisten)	Rudersdal	2
Læsø Citizens' List (Læsø Borgerliste)	Læsø	2
New Stevns (Nyt Stevns)	Stevns	2
Skive List (Skive-Listen)	Skive	2
Your Voice (Din Stemme)	Lolland	2
Annelise Madsen (Annelise Madsen)	Ishøj	1
Citizens' List (Borgerlisten)	Brønderslev	1
Common List (Fælleslisten)	Vordingborg	1
Democratic Balance (Demokratisk Balance)	Morsø	1
Fjord Land List (Fjordlandslisten)	Frederikssund	1
Havdrup List (Havdruplisten)	Solrød	1
Hvidovre List (Hvidovrelisten)	Hvidovre	1
Liberal Citizen's List (Liberal Borgerliste)	Vejen	1
Local List (Lokallisten)	Faxe	1
Local List Faaborg-Midtfyn (Lokallisten Faaborg-Midtfyn)	Faaborg-Midtfyn	1
Local List Gladsaxe (Lokallisten Gladsaxe)	Gladsaxe	1
Local List Jammerbugt (Lokallisten Jammerbugt)	Jammerbugt	1
Local List Lolland (Lokallisten Lolland)	Lolland	1
Local Political Forum (Lokalpolitisk Forum)	Billund	1
Nakskov List (Nakskov Listen)	Lolland	1
Resident List (Beboerlisten)	Randers	1
Social Conservatives (SocialKonservative)	Hørsholm	1
South Amager List (Sydamagerlisten)	Dragør	1
Tårnby List (Tårnby Listen)	Tårnby	1
Vesthimmerland List (VestHimmerlandsListen)	Vesthimmerland	1
Welfare List (Velfærdslisten)	Randers	1
Ærø's Future (Ærøs Fremtid)	Ærø	1
Ærø in Centrum (Ærø i Centrum)	Ærø	1
Total		90

==== Number of absolute majorities (a majority of seats won by the party itself) ====
Party		Number	Change
A	Social Democrats	5	▼5
C	Conservatives	4	▲1
V	Venstre	4	▼3
Total		13	▼7

==== Number of municipal council elections contested and number of municipal councils representations by party (Note: Also counting the Copenhagen City council) ====
Party		Elected into	Change	Contested
A	Social Democrats	98	0	98
C	Conservatives	97	▲18	98
V	Venstre	94	▼2	97
F	Socialist People's Party	89	▲10	97
O	Danish People's Party	71	▼20	98
Ø	Red–Green Alliance	67	▼2	91
B	Danish Social Liberal Party	58	▲3	92
D	New Right	58	▲57	95
L (Note: not official)	Local Parties	35	▼1	86
I	Liberal Alliance	5	▼19	66
K	Christian Democrats	5	▲1	46
S	Schleswig Party	4	0	4
Å	The Alternative	4	▼11	35
G	Vegan Party	0	New	16

==== Mayors in the municipalities ====
The mayors (Danish: borgmester; plural: borgmestre) of the 98 municipalities head the council meetings and are the chair of the finance committee in each of their respective municipalities. Only in Copenhagen, this mayor – the head of the finance committee and council meetings – is called the lord mayor (Danish: overborgmester).

Mayors after the election
Party	Number	Change
Social Democrats	44	▼3
Venstre	34	▼3
Conservatives	14	▲6
Socialist People's Party	2	▲1
Danish Social Liberal Party	1	0
Liberal Alliance	1	▲1
Schleswig Party	1	▲1
Local parties	1	▼1
Danish People's Party	0	▼1
The Alternative	0	▼1

== Sum of mayor positions and seats won by Folketing Constituency ==
=== North Jutland ===
Mayors after the election
Party	Number	Change
Venstre	9	▲4
Social Democrats	2	▼2
Danish Social Liberal Party	0	▼1
Danish People's Party	0	▼1

Party		Council seats	Change
V	Venstre	94	▼1
A	Social Democrats	92	▼17
C	Conservatives	42	▲19
F	Green Left	12	▲5
O	Danish People's Party	10	▼14
L	Local Parties	10	▼3
D	New Right	8	▲8
Ø	Red–Green Alliance	8	▲3
B	Danish Social Liberal Party	6	▲1
Å	The Alternative	1	0
I	Liberal Alliance	0	▼1

=== West Jutland ===
Mayors after the election
Party	Number	Change
Venstre	7	0
Social Democrats	2	0

Party		Council seats	Change
V	Venstre	96	▼4
A	Social Democrats	62	▼7
C	Conservatives	31	▲15
F	Green Left	15	0
B	Danish Social Liberal Party	8	▲1
K	Christian Democrats	7	0
D	New Right	6	▲6
O	Danish People's Party	6	▼10
L	Local Parties	6	▲1
Ø	Red–Green Alliance	3	▼1
Å	The Alternative	1	0
I	Liberal Alliance	0	▼1

=== East Jutland ===
Mayors after the election
Party	Number	Change
Social Democrats	7	▼2
Venstre	2	▲1
Conservatives	1	▲1

Party		Council seats	Change
A	Social Democrats	87	▼11
V	Venstre	61	▼14
C	Conservatives	38	▲25
F	Green Left	19	▲2
Ø	Red–Green Alliance	12	▲2
B	Danish Social Liberal Party	11	▲4
D	New Right	8	▲8
O	Danish People's Party	8	▼15
L	Local Parties	4	▲2
I	Liberal Alliance	3	▼2
K	Christian Democrats	2	▲1
Å	The Alternative	1	▼2

=== South Jutland ===
Mayors after the election
Party	Number	Change
Venstre	5	▼4
Conservatives	3	▲3
Social Democrats	2	0
Danish Social Liberal Party	1	▲1
Schleswig Party	1	▲1
The Alternative	0	▼1

Party		Council seats	Change
V	Venstre	107	▼8
A	Social Democrats	94	▼8
C	Conservatives	39	▲24
F	Green Left	16	▲4
O	Danish People's Party	14	▼20
L	Local Parties	14	▲4
D	New Right	12	▲12
B	Danish Social Liberal Party	9	▲2
Ø	Red–Green Alliance	4	▼4
K	Christian Democrats	1	▲1
I	Liberal Alliance	0	▼6
Å	The Alternative	0	▼1

=== Funen ===
Mayors after the election
Party	Number	Change
Social Democrats	6	0
Venstre	3	0
Green Left	1	0

Party		Council seats	Change
A	Social Democrats	81	0
V	Venstre	72	▼2
C	Conservatives	33	▲13
F	Green Left	22	▲4
Ø	Red–Green Alliance	9	0
O	Danish People's Party	8	▼17
B	Social Liberals	7	0
L	Local Parties	6	▲3
D	New Right	4	▲4
Å	The Alternative	0	▼3

=== Zealand ===
Mayors after the election
Party	Number	Change
Social Democrats	8	▼1
Venstre	6	0
Conservatives	1	0
Liberal Alliance	1	▲1
Local Parties	1	0

Party		Council seats	Change
A	Social Democrats	151	▼3
V	Venstre	104	▼12
C	Conservatives	55	▲28
F	Green Left	28	▲6
O	Danish People's Party	26	▼26
L	Local Parties	23	▼2
Ø	Red–Green Alliance	19	▼2
D	New Right	16	▲16
B	Danish Social Liberal Party	14	▼1
I	Liberal Alliance	5	▼2
Å	The Alternative	0	▼2

=== North Zealand ===
Mayors after the election
Party	Number	Change
Social Democrats	6	▲2
Conservatives	3	▲1
Venstre	2	▼2
Local Parties	0	▼1

Party		Council seats	Change
A	Social Democrats	64	▼14
C	Conservatives	61	▲24
V	Venstre	56	▼8
F	Green Left	20	▲10
B	Danish Social Liberal Party	15	0
Ø	Red–Green Alliance	13	▲3
L	Local Parties	12	0
D	New Right	5	▲4
O	Danish People's Party	5	▼10
I	Liberal Alliance	0	▼5

=== Greater Copenhagen ===
Mayors after the election
Party	Number	Change
Social Democrats	8	0
Conservatives	4	0
Green Left	1	▲1
Venstre	0	▼1

Party		Council seats	Change
A	Social Democrats	94	▼17
C	Conservatives	70	▲15
F	Green Left	27	▲10
V	Venstre	19	▼9
Ø	Red–Green Alliance	18	0
B	Danish Social Liberal Party	13	▲5
L	Local Parties	9	▲6
O	Danish People's Party	7	▼15
D	New Right	4	▲4
Å	The Alternative	0	▼1

=== Copenhagen ===
Mayors after the election
Party	Number	Change
Social Democrats	3	▲1
Conservatives	1	0
Venstre	0	▼1

Party		Council seats	Change
C	Conservatives	29	▲10
A	Social Democrats	26	▼4
Ø	Red–Green Alliance	22	▲7
B	Danish Social Liberal Party	10	▲1
F	Green Left	8	▲1
V	Venstre	8	▼4
L	Local Parties	7	▲3
Å	The Alternative	3	▼4
D	New Right	2	▲2
O	Danish People's Party	2	▼6
I	Liberal Alliance	1	▼2

=== Bornholm ===
Mayors after the election
Party	Number	Change
Conservatives	1	▲1
Social Democrats	0	▼1

Party		Council seats	Change
Ø	Red–Green Alliance	7	▲5
A	Social Democrats	4	▼4
O	Danish People's Party	4	0
C	Conservatives	3	▲3
V	Venstre	2	▼3
L	Local Parties	2	▲1
K	Christian Democrats	1	0
F	Green Left	0	▼1
Å	The Alternative	0	▼1

== Overview of mayors prior to and after the elections ==
The term of office for the mayors elected by the majority of councillors among its members in each municipal council is the same as for the councils elected, namely 1 January 2022 until 31 December 2025. The correct name for the Municipality on the somewhat remote island of Bornholm is Regional Municipality, because the Municipality also handles several tasks not carried out by the other Danish municipalities but by the regions.

Mayors outgoing and incoming
Municipality	Incumbent mayor	Elected mayor
Albertslund Municipality	Steen Christiansen	Steen Christiansen
Allerød Municipality	Karsten Längerich	Karsten Längerich
Assens Municipality	Søren Steen Andersen	Søren Steen Andersen
Ballerup Municipality	Jesper Würtzen	Jesper Würtzen
Billund Municipality	Ib Kristensen	Stephanie Storbank
Bornholm Regional Municipality	Thomas Thors	Jacob Trøst
Brøndby Municipality	Kent Max Magelund	Kent Max Magelund
Brønderslev Municipality	Mikael Klitgaard	Mikael Klitgaard
Copenhagen Municipality	Lars Weiss	Sophie Hæstorp Andersen
Dragør Municipality	Eik Dahl Bidstrup	Kenneth Gøtterup
Egedal Municipality	Karsten Søndergaard	Vicky Holst Rasmussen
Esbjerg Municipality	Jesper Frost Rasmussen	Jesper Frost Rasmussen
Fanø Municipality	Sofie Valbjørn	Frank Jensen
Favrskov Municipality	Nils Borring	Lars Storgaard
Faxe Municipality	Ole Vive	Ole Vive
Fredensborg Municipality	Thomas Lykke Pedersen	Thomas Lykke Pedersen
Fredericia Municipality	Steen Wrist	Steen Wrist
Frederiksberg Municipality	Simon Aggesen	Michael Vindfeldt
Frederikshavn Municipality	Birgit Hansen	Birgit Hansen
Frederikssund Municipality	John Schmidt Andersen	Tina Tving Stauning
Furesø Municipality	Ole Bondo Christensen	Ole Bondo Christensen
Faaborg-Midtfyn Municipality	Hans Stavnsager	Hans Stavnsager
Gentofte Municipality	Hans Toft	Michael Fenger
Gladsaxe Municipality	Trine Græse	Trine Græse
Glostrup Municipality	John Engelhardt	Kasper Damsgaard
Greve Municipality	Pernille Beckmann	Pernille Beckmann
Gribskov Municipality	Anders Gerner Frost	Bent Hansen
Guldborgsund Municipality	John Brædder	Simon Hansen
Haderslev Municipality	Hans Peter Geil	Mads Skau
Halsnæs Municipality	Steffen Jensen	Steffen Jensen
Hedensted Municipality	Kasper Glyngø	Ole Vind
Helsingør Municipality	Benedikte Kiær	Benedikte Kiær
Herlev Municipality	Thomas Gyldal Petersen	Thomas Gyldal Petersen
Herning Municipality	Lars Krarup	Dorte West
Hillerød Municipality	Kirsten Jensen	Kirsten Jensen
Hjørring Municipality	Arne Boelt	Søren Smalbro
Holbæk Municipality	Christina Krzyrosiak Hansen	Christina Krzyrosiak Hansen
Holstebro Municipality	H.C. Østerby	H.C. Østerby
Horsens Municipality	Peter Sørensen	Peter Sørensen
Hvidovre Municipality	Helle Moesgaard Adelborg	Anders Wolf Andresen
Høje-Taastrup Municipality	Michael Ziegler	Michael Ziegler
Hørsholm Municipality	Morten Slotved	Morten Slotved
Ikast-Brande Municipality	Ib Boye Lauritsen	Ib Boye Lauritsen
Ishøj Municipality	Ole Bjørstorp	Merete Amdisen
Jammerbugt Municipality	Mogens Gade	Mogens Gade
Kalundborg Municipality	Martin Damm	Martin Damm
Kerteminde Municipality	Kasper Ejsing Olesen	Kasper Ejsing Olesen
Kolding Municipality	Jørn Pedersen	Knud Erik Langhoff
Køge Municipality	Marie Stærke	Marie Stærke
Langeland Municipality	Tonni Hansen	Tonni Hansen
Lejre Municipality	Carsten Rasmussen	Tina Mandrup
Lemvig Municipality	Erik Flyvholm	Erik Flyvholm
Lolland Municipality	Holger Schou Rasmussen	Holger Schou Rasmussen
Lyngby-Taarbæk Municipality	Sofia Osmani	Sofia Osmani
Læsø Municipality	Karsten Nielsen	Tobias Birch Johansen
Mariagerfjord Municipality	Mogens Jespersen	Mogens Jespersen
Middelfart Municipality	Johannes Lundsfryd Jensen	Johannes Lundsfryd Jensen
Morsø Municipality	Hans Ejner Bertelsen	Hans Ejner Bertelsen
Norddjurs Municipality	Jan Petersen	Kasper Bjerregaard
Nordfyn Municipality	Morten Andersen	Morten Andersen
Nyborg Municipality	Kenneth Muhs	Kenneth Muhs
Næstved Municipality	Carsten Rasmussen	Carsten Rasmussen
Odder Municipality	Uffe Jensen	Lone Jakobi
Odense Municipality	Peter Rahbæk Juel	Peter Rahbæk Juel
Odsherred Municipality	Thomas Adelskov	Karina Vincentz
Randers Municipality	Torben Hansen	Torben Hansen
Rebild Municipality	Leon Sebbelin	Jesper Greth
Ringkøbing-Skjern Municipality	Hans Østergaard	Hans Østergaard
Ringsted Municipality	Henrik Hvidesten	Henrik Hvidesten
Roskilde Municipality	Tomas Breddam	Tomas Breddam
Rudersdal Municipality	Jens Ive	Ann Sofie Orth
Rødovre Municipality	Erik Nielsen	Britt Jensen
Samsø Municipality	Marcel Meijer	Marcel Meijer
Silkeborg Municipality	Steen Vindum	Helle Gade
Skanderborg Municipality	Frands Fischer	Frands Fischer
Skive Municipality	Peder Christian Kirkegaard	Peder Christian Kirkegaard
Slagelse Municipality	John Dyrby Paulsen	Knud Vincents
Solrød Municipality	Niels Emil Hörup	Emil Blücher
Sorø Municipality	Gert Jørgensen	Gert Jørgensen
Stevns Municipality	Anette Mortensen	Henning Urban Dam
Struer Municipality	Niels Viggo Lynghøj	Mads Jakobsen
Svendborg Municipality	Bo Hansen	Bo Hansen
Syddjurs Municipality	Ole Bollesen	Michael Stegger Jensen
Sønderborg Municipality	Erik Lauritzen	Erik Lauritzen
Thisted Municipality	Ulla Vestergaard	Niels Jørgen Pedersen
Tønder Municipality	Henrik Frandsen	Jørgen Popp Petersen
Tårnby Municipality	Allan Andersen	Allan Andersen
Vallensbæk Municipality	Henrik Rasmussen	Henrik Rasmussen
Varde Municipality	Erik Buhl Nielsen	Mads Sørensen
Vejen Municipality	Egon Fræhr	Frank Schmidt-Hansen
Vejle Municipality	Jens Ejner Christensen	Jens Ejner Christensen
Vesthimmerland Municipality	Per Bach Laursen	Per Bach Laursen
Viborg Municipality	Ulrik Wilbek	Ulrik Wilbek
Vordingborg Municipality	Mikael Smed	Mikael Smed
Ærø Municipality	Ole Wej Petersen	Peter Hansted
Aabenraa Municipality	Thomas Andresen	Jan Riber Jakobsen
Aalborg Municipality	Thomas Kastrup-Larsen	Thomas Kastrup-Larsen
Aarhus Municipality	Jacob Bundsgaard	Jacob Bundsgaard
