= Overlade =

- Village
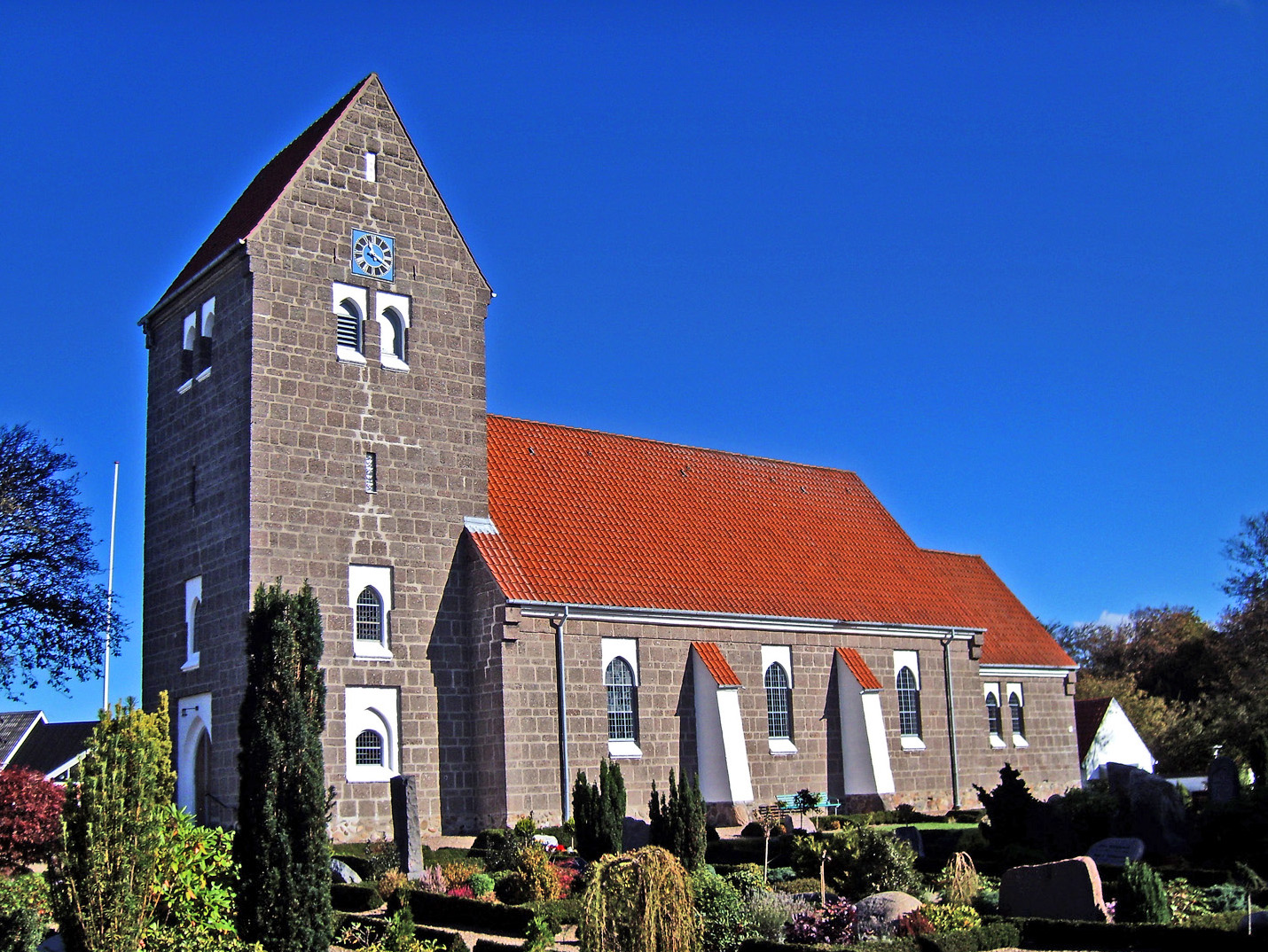
- Overlade Church

- Location within North Jutland Region Location within Denmark
- Coordinates: 56°51′31″N 9°15′56″E
- Country: Denmark
- Region: North Denmark (Nordjylland)
- Municipality: Vesthimmerland

Population (2026)
  - Total: 399
- Time zone: UTC+1 (Central Europe Time)
  - Summer (DST): UTC+2
- Postal code: 9670
- Website: www.overlade.dk

Overlade is a village in western Himmerland, Denmark, with a population of 399 (1 January 2026), located 12 km north from Farsø, 16 km south of Løgstør, 3 kilometers from the Limfjord and seven kilometers south of Ranum. The village is located in the North Denmark Region and belongs to Vesthimmerland Municipality.

Overlade was founded by the monks of Vitskøl Abbey most likely the monks were from the Cistercian Order. The village has a recent history of rich business with several factories, forges, bakeries, butcher sale a bicycle shop and much more. The village inn burned down in 1984. Like many small towns, some of these businesses through time has gone, but the village still has some shops and craft stores.

Overlade Church built in 1916 is located in the village.

The Reunification Stone in Overlade was unveiled on July 12, 1920 to celebrate the reunification of Southern Jutland with Denmark.

== Notable people ==
- Per Bach Laursen (born 1962 in Overlade) current mayor of Vesthimmerlands Municipality
