= Strandby (Vesthimmerlands Municipality) =

- Village
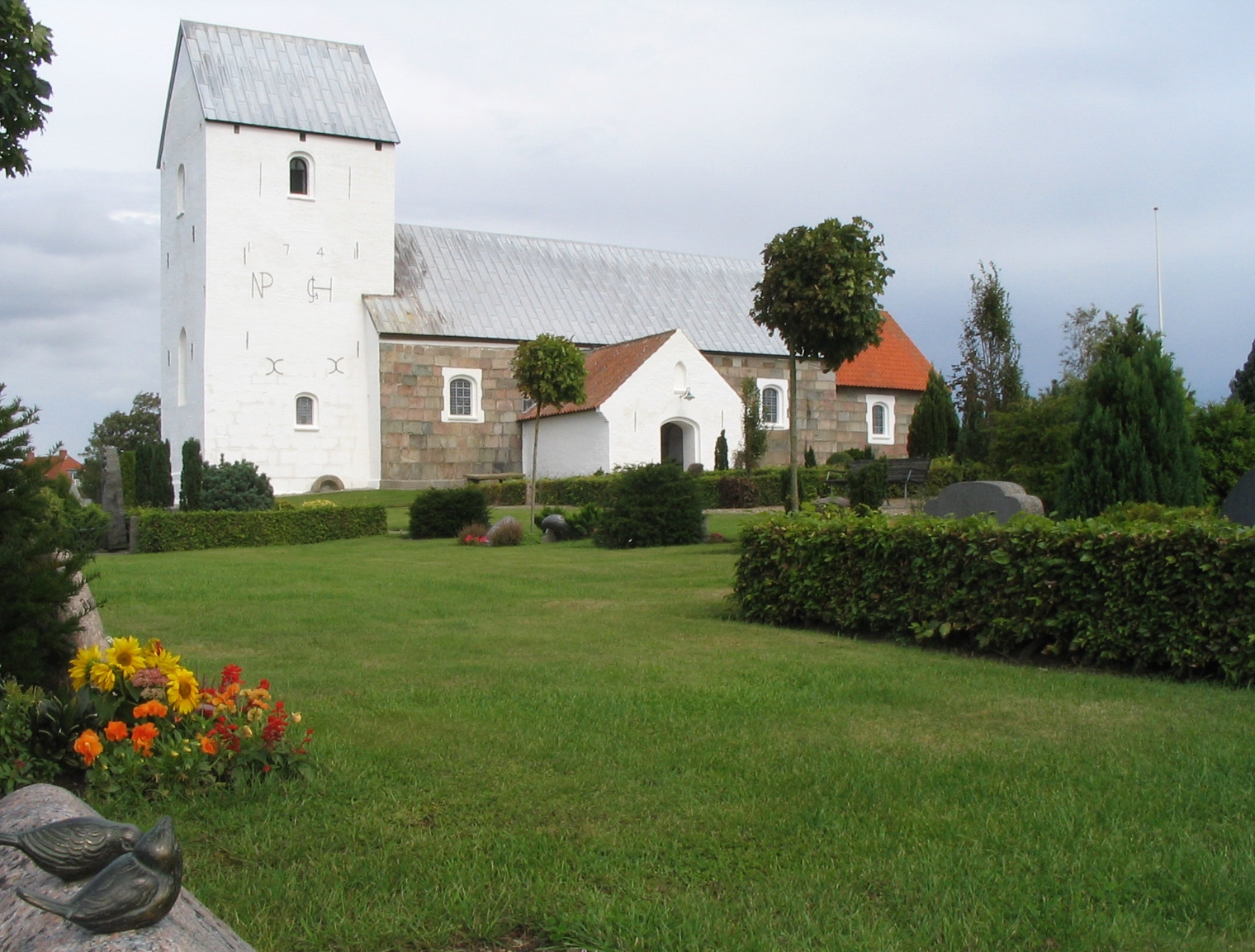
- Strandby Church

- Location within North Jutland Region Location within Denmark
- Coordinates: 56°47′24″N 9°12′58″E
- Country: Denmark
- Region: Central Denmark (Midtjylland)
- Municipality: Vesthimmerland Municipality

Population (2026)
  - Total: 245
- Time zone: UTC+1 (Central Europe Time)
  - Summer (DST): UTC+2
- Postal code: 9640

Strandby is a village in western Himmerland with a population of 245 (1. January 2026). Strandby is located near Ertebølle between Risgårde Bredning in the Limfjord one kilometer to the west and Farsø nine kilometers to the east.

The village is located in the North Jutland region and belongs to Vesthimmerland Municipality. Strandby is located in Strandby parish.

Strandby Church build in the late 12th century is located in the village.
