= Listed buildings in Vesthimmerland Municipality =

This list of listed buildings in Vesthimmerland Municipality is a list of listed buildings in Vesthimmerland Municipality, Denmark.

== The list ==
Listing name	Image	Location	Year built	Contributing resource	Ref
Aggersborggård		Aggersborgvej 170A, 9670 Løgstør	1758	Three-winged main building from 1758	Ref4
Hessel (3)		Hesselvej 40, 9640 Farsø	1758	Four-winged farmhouse from the beginning of the 17th century, the cobbled courtyard with the watering pond the four linden trees as well as the two gardens with low stone walls to the west and south of the house	Ref4
Kanalbetjenthusene ved Lendrup (4)		Klostervej 4, 9670 Løgstør	1863	Two canal officer houses with associated storage buildings from 1863	Ref
Kanalfogedboligen og Gitterdragerdrejebroen		Kanalvejen 40, 9670 Løgstør	1863	Kananfogedboligen: House from 1863	Ref
Kanalfogedboligen og Gitterdragerdrejebroen		Kanalvejen 40, 9670 Løgstør	1861	Gitterdrehebroen: Swing bridge from 1861	Ref
Koppesmølle Andelsmejeri		Halkærvej 103, 9240 Nibe	1932	Former dairy from 1932 designed by E.V. Lind including the tall chimney	Ref
Koppesmølle Andelsmejeri		Halkærvej 103, 9240 Nibe	1932	Garage	Ref
Lerkenfeld		Svingelbjergvej 106, 9640 Farsø		Three-winged main building	Ref
Vitskøl Kloster, Bjørnsholm		Viborgvej 475, 9681 Ranum		Three-winged main building from the Middle Ages but the west wing rebuilt in 1643–46 and the east wing rebuilt in 1769	Ref
