= Vester Hornum =

- Town
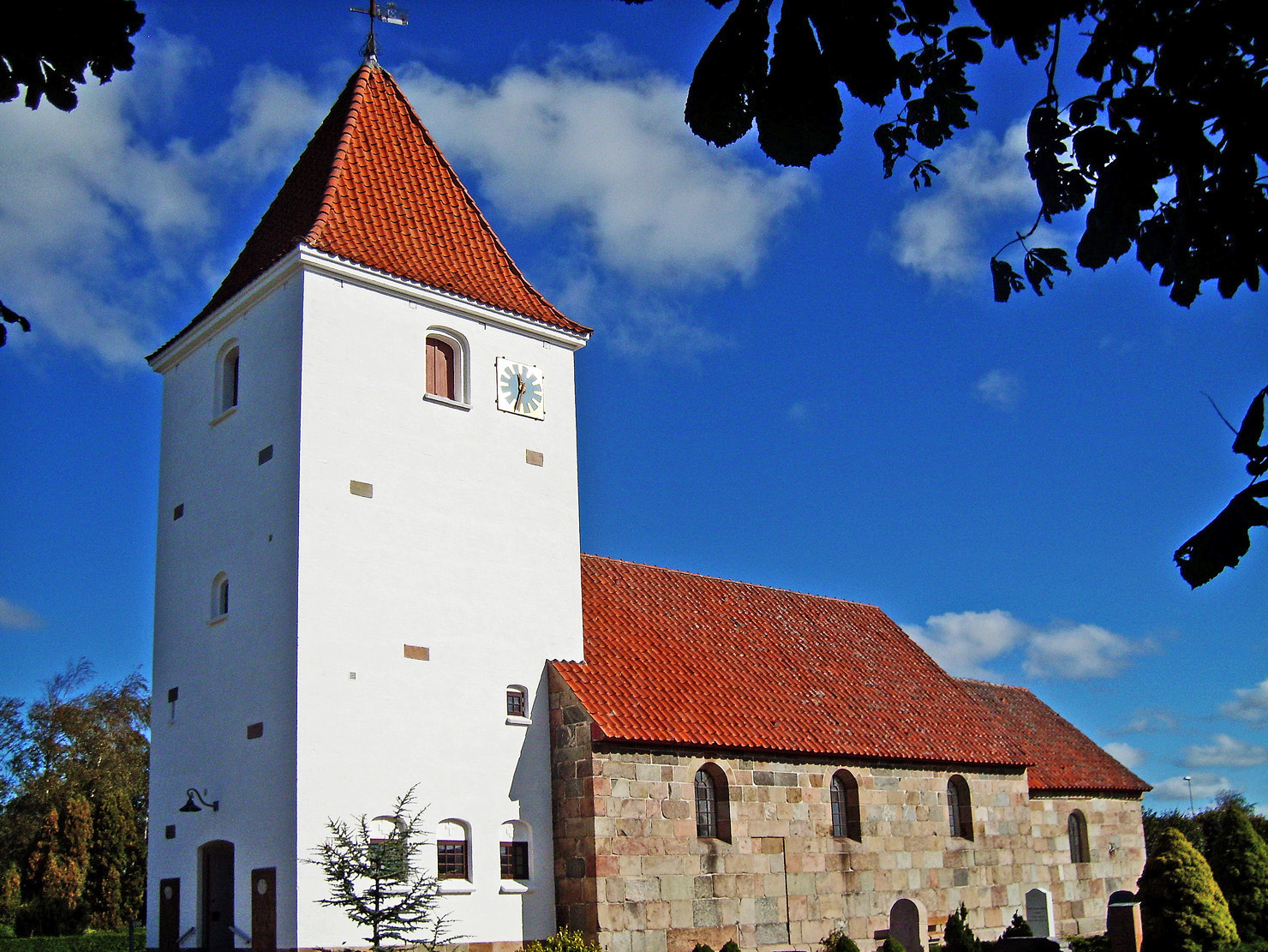
- Vester Hornum church

- Location in North Jutland Region Vester Hornum (Denmark)
- Coordinates: 56°50′2″N 9°21′38″E
- Country: Denmark
- Region: North Jutland Region
- Municipality: Vesthimmerland Municipality

Population (2026)
  - Total: 469
- Time zone: UTC+1 (Central Europe Time)
  - Summer (DST): UTC+2
- Postal code: 9640

Vester Hornum is a small town in Himmerland, Denmark, with a population of 469 (1 January 2026), located in Vester Hornum parish. The town is located in Vesthimmerland Municipality in the North Jutland Region.

Vester Hornum Church and Vester Hornum school are located in the town. It also have what is called "Vester Hornum løberne" (English:Vester Hornum runners) and it is a union of exerciseists who regularly gather for joint exercise in the form of running. The name of Vester Hornum translate into Western Hornum since it is located west of Hornum.
