= Knud Vældgaard Kristensen =

Danish mason and politician

- Born: 7 June 1953 (age 72); Farsø, Vesthimmerland Municipality, Denmark
- Known for: Has been Mayor of the Aars Municipality & Vesthimmerland Municipality.

Knud Vældgaard Kristensen (born 7 June 1953) is a Danish mason and politician, and he was the son of Age Kristensen and Inge Kristensen. He a member of Danish party Det Konservative Folkeparti. He is currently not involved with politics.

Kristensen became a mason in 1973 and has been independent with his own masonry and construction business since 1975, which he established himself. It is called Hornum Murer- og Entreprenørforretning (English: Hornum masonry and contracting business).

He was a counselor in Aars Municipality from 1986–2006, in the period 1998-2001 as deputy mayor and from 2002–2006 as mayor. In 2006, he was elected municipal council in Vesthimmerland Municipality, but did not become mayor. In 2006, he became Deputy Chairman of Danish Construction in the region of North Jutland Region, and in 2007 he became president. Knud Kristensen is his party's labor, housing, animal welfare and food rapporteur and chairman of the Parliament's Labor Market Committee. He was a mayor candidate for Conservative in the municipal elections in 2010, and was elected Mayor with the support of Venstre at the constitution. He then resigned from the parliament. He ran for mayor in the 2017 Municipality election but lost it to Per Bach Laursen. Then on 19 January 2018, he retired from the city council and politics, due to health reasons, though he did not reject a future comeback.
