= Hornum, Denmark =

Hornum
- Town
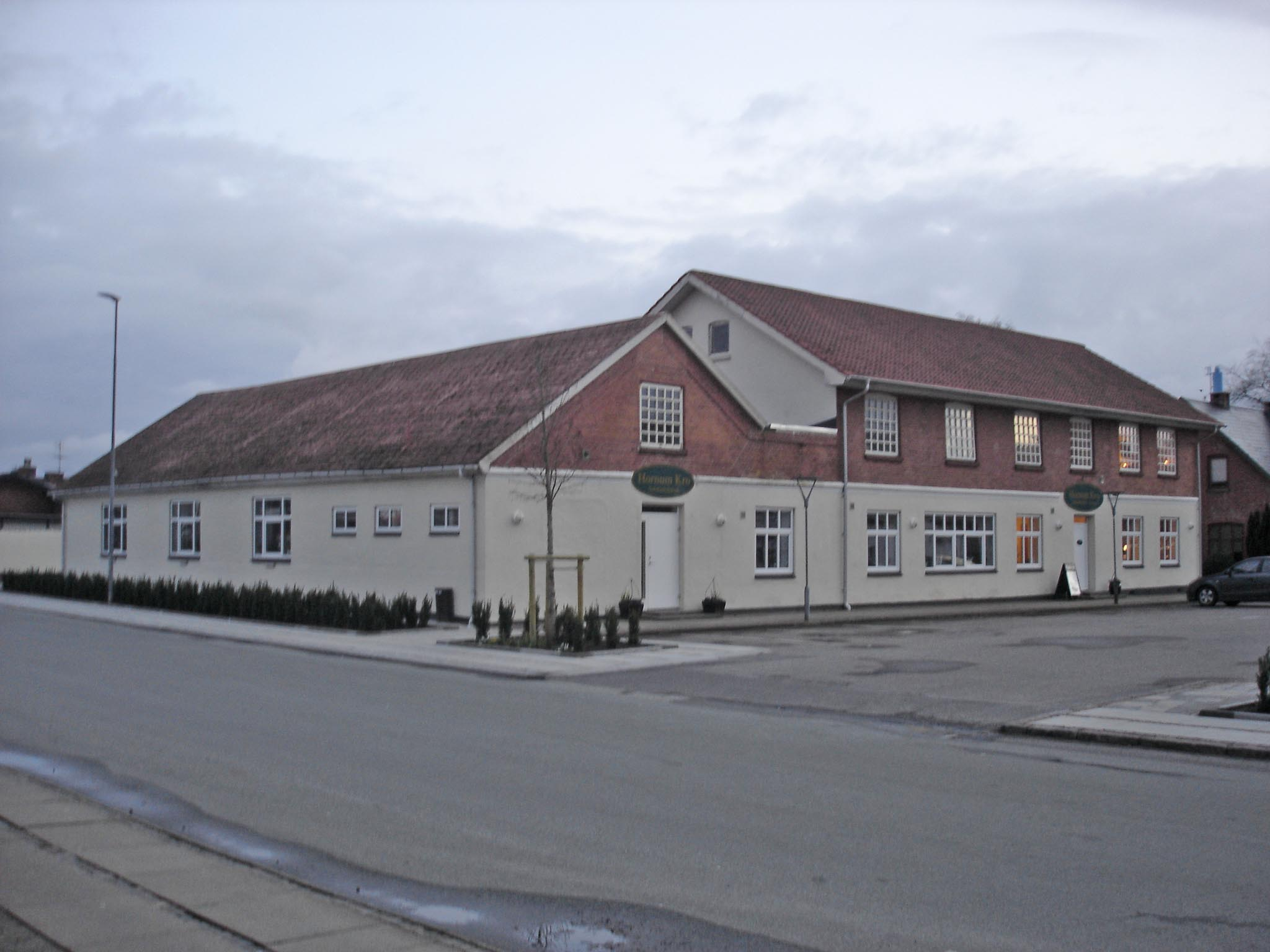
- Hornum Inn

- Location in Denmark Hornum (North Jutland Region)
- Coordinates: 56.841°N 9.426°E
- Country: Denmark
- Region: North Denmark (Nordjylland)
- Municipality: Vesthimmerland

Population (2026)
  - Total: 935
- Time zone: UTC+1 (Central Europe Time)
  - Summer (DST): UTC+2
- Postal code: 9600
- Website: http://www.vognsild.dk/

Hornum is a town in western Himmerland with a population of 935 (1. January 2026), located 21 km southeast of Løgstør and 9 km northwest of Aars. The town belongs to the municipality of Vesthimmerland Municipality and is located in the North Denmark Region.

Hornum is located in Ulstrup parish. Ulstrup Church, also known as Hornum-Ulstrup Church, is located a little south of the town by the old village of Ulstrup. In the northern part of the town lies Søttrup Frimenighedskirke.

== History ==
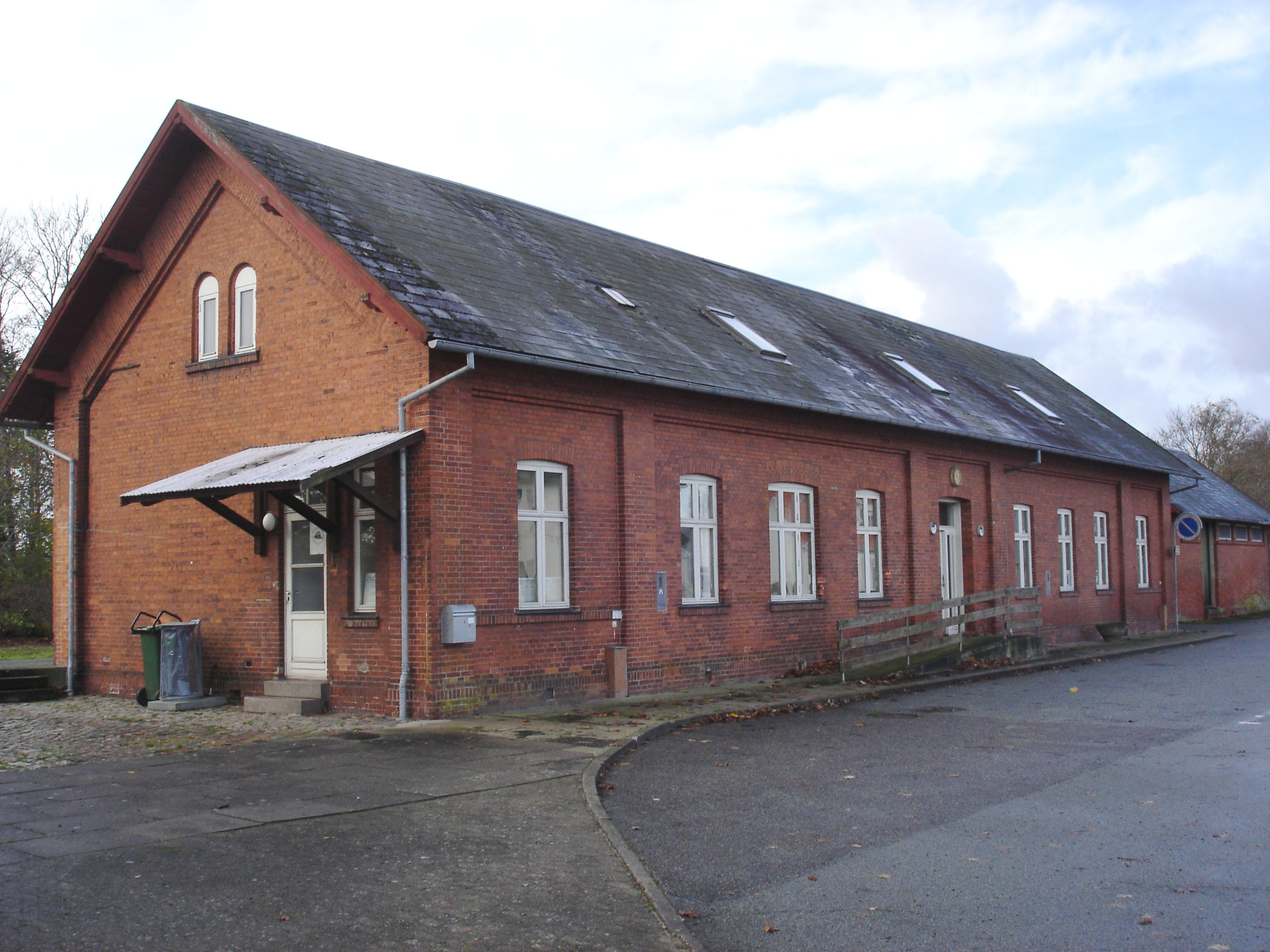
Hornums old Station

Ulstrup got a station on the Himmerlands runways, opened in 1893. But when there was an Ulstrup station on Langå-Struer, the station was named Hornum. The station had two crossings and a loading track with a blind track at each end.

In 1901, the town was described as follows: "Ulstrup, by the road, with Church, Præstegd., School, cooperative dairy, Inn, Market Square (Market in Jan., March, July, Sept. and Dec.) And, in the vicinity, Hornum Stationsby with Railway Station, Telegraphs and Postpedition ".

Passenger traffic on the Hobro-Løgstør line ended in 1966, but Hornum still had an expedition of goods as the freight traffic on the Viborg-Løgstør line continued to 1999. The track was taken up in 2006, allowing you to mount the cycling and hiking on the former railroute.

The station building, which was expanded several times and after the latest expansion in 1934 was about twice the size of the railway station's other stations, is well-preserved and still has its signage. It is located on Jernbanegade 3 and accommodates the Himmerlands Railway Museum, local history archives and a model railway.

== Facilities ==
Hornum School has 269 students, divided between 0.-9. grade. The town has two kindergartens: Elmevej, founded in 1974 and rated for 35 children, and Kirkevej, established in 1994 and rated for 44 children.

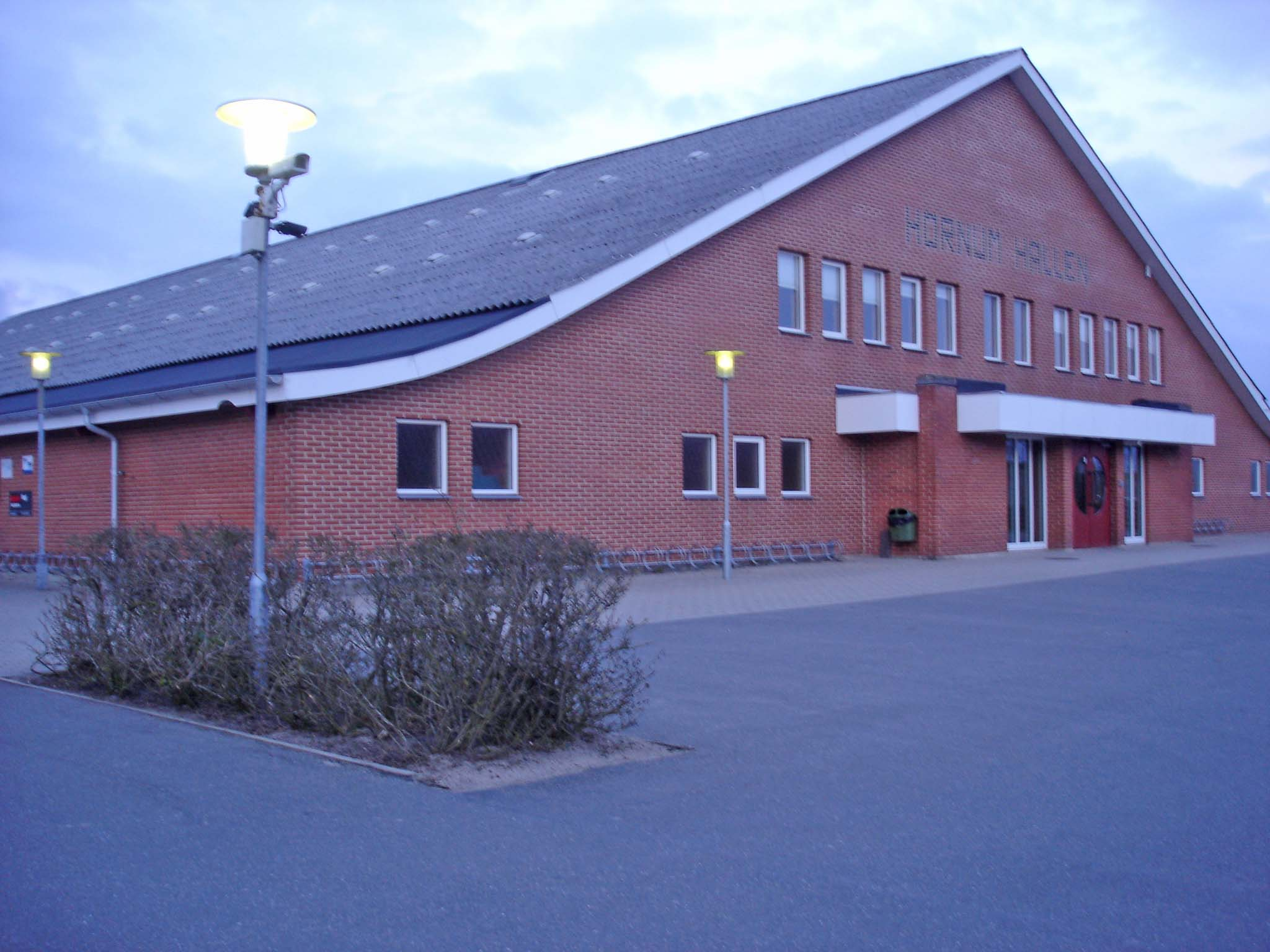
Hornum Hall

Hornum Sports Association was founded in 1903 as a football club, but now also offers badminton in the Hornum Hall, where Søttrup Gymnastics Association offers gymnastics and Blære/Hornum Handball Club offers handball. The city has a citizen's association and a local history association.

Hornum School has 227 students, divided between 0.-9. grade. The town has two kindergartens: Elmevej, founded in 1974 and rated for 35 children, and Kirkevej, established in 1994 and rated for 44 children.

Hornum Sports Association was founded in 1903 as a football club, but now also offers badminton in the Hornum Hall, where Søttrup Gymnastics Association offers gymnastics and Blære / Hornum Handball Club offers handball. The city has a citizen's association and a local history association.

In Hornum there is a Dagli'Brugs, clothes shop, hairdresser, savings bank, gas station and inn and the hostel, used by both young and old.
