= Per Bach Laursen =

Danish politician (born 1962)

- Born: 7 February 1962 (age 64); Løgstør, Vesthimmerland Municipality, Denmark
- Known for: Is the mayor of Vesthimmerland Municipality & owner of Lundgård.

Per Bach Laursen (born 7 February 1962 in Løgstør) is from Overlade near Løgstør, he is proprietor and owner of Lundgård. He has been the current mayor of Vesthimmerlands Municipality since 2018 and is member of Venstre, he was preceded by Knud Vældgaard Kristensen who was from Det Konservative Folkeparti, he has been a Vice-mayor of Vesthimmerland Municipality from 2010 to 2018 and he also ran for mayor of Vesthimmerland Municipality in 2013. In the 2017 Municipality election he received the most votes of them all of the candidates in Vesthimmerland Municipality election.

Per Bach Laursen has been active in many different organizations mostly agriculture organizations, some of the following:

- Former president The Danish Swine Producers.
- Former Chairman of the European Swine producers.
- Board member of LaDS Holding A/S.
- Board member of kartoffelmelsfabrikken AKV-Langholt.
- Council Member of Det dyreetiske råd (English: The Animal Council).
- Vice Chairman of Tolvmandssektionen.

== See also ==
- Jens Lauritzen
- Aars
