= Johannes V. Jensen =

Danish author (1873–1950)

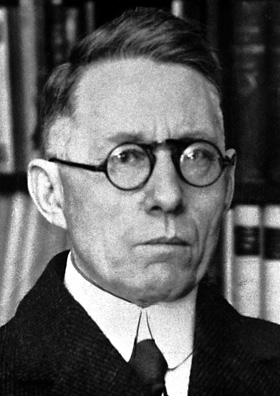
- Born: Johannes Vilhelm Jensen; 20 January 1873; Farsø, Jutland, Denmark
- Died: 25 November 1950 (aged 77); Østerbro, Copenhagen, Denmark
- Occupation: Writer
- Writing career
- Notable awards: Nobel Prize in Literature; 1944

Johannes Vilhelm Jensen (Danish: [joˈhænˀəs ˈvilhelˀm ˈjensn̩]; 20 January 1873 – 25 November 1950) was a Danish author, known as one of the great Danish writers of the first half of 20th century. He was awarded the 1944 Nobel Prize in Literature "for the rare strength and fertility of his poetic imagination with which is combined an intellectual curiosity of wide scope and a bold, freshly creative style". One of his sisters, Thit Jensen, was also a well-known writer and a very vocal, and occasionally controversial, early feminist.

Jensen began his literary career by writing pulp fiction, but he made the move into more serious literature by the late 1890s. His early novels depict his disillusionment with large, modern cities. His historical novel The Fall of the King (1933) focuses on King Christian II. It was reportedly an "indictment of Danish indecision and lack of vitality, which Jensen saw as a national disease".

== Early years ==
He was born in Farsø, a village in north Jutland, Denmark, as the son of a veterinary surgeon and he grew up in a rural environment. While studying medicine at the University of Copenhagen he worked as a writer to fund his studies. After three years of studying he chose to change careers and devote himself fully to literature.

== Literary works ==
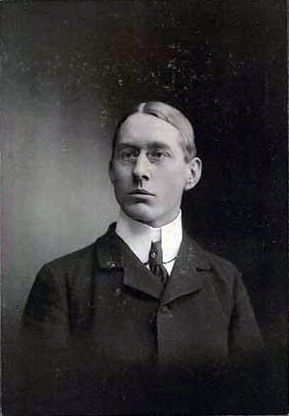
Johannes V. Jensen in 1902.

Jensen began his career writing pulp fiction, but made the move into more serious literature with the publication of Danskere (1896, Danishmen), soon followed by Einar Elkjær (1898). Both early novels depict disillusionment with large, modern cities. From there, Jensen went on to write Himmerland Stories (1898–1910), comprising a series of tales set in the part of Denmark where he was born. His 1904 short story "Ane og Koen" ("Anne and the Cow") went on to be translated into English by incarcerated author and translator Victor Folke Nelson in 1928.

During 1900 and 1901 Jensen wrote his first most significant novel, Kongens Fald (translated into English as The Fall of the King in 1933), a modern historical novel centered on King Christian II. Literary critic Martin Seymour-Smith said it is an "indictment of Danish indecision and lack of vitality, which Jensen saw as a national disease. Apart from this aspect of it, it is a penetrating study of sixteenth-century people."

In 1906 Jensen published his first collection of poetry, Digte 1906 (i.e. Poems 1906), would give rise to his reputation as an early leading Modernist in Denmark.

In addition to his novels, short stories, and poetry, Jensen also wrote a few plays, and many essays, notable for their grand narratives, futurism, jingoism, and interest in anthropology and the philosophy of evolution. The latter culminated in a cycle of six novels, Den lange rejse (1908–22), translated into English as The Long Journey (1908–1922), later published in a two-volume edition in 1938, sometimes called an "evolutionary bible" of mankind. In the short autobiographical account of his career which he wrote on receiving the Nobel Prize, Jensen said he was motivated to "introduce the philosophy of evolution into the sphere of literature ... I was prompted to do this because of the misinterpretation and distortion of Darwinism" by the Nazis.

Like his compatriot Hans Christian Andersen, he travelled extensively; a trip to the United States inspired a poem of his, "Paa Memphis Station" [At the train station, Memphis, Tennessee], which is well known in Denmark. Walt Whitman was among the writers who influenced Jensen. Jensen later became an atheist.

== Late career ==
Jensen's most popular literary works were all completed before 1920, a year which also marked his initiation of the Museumcentre Aars in the town of Aars in Himmerland. After this he mostly concentrated on ambitious biological and zoological studies in an effort to create an ethical system based upon Darwinian ideas. He also hoped to renew classical poetry.

By his own account, Jensen often wrote for newspapers, though he never employed by one.

== Nobel Prize in Literature ==
In 1944 Johannes V. Jensen was awarded the Nobel Prize in Literature "for the rare strength and fertility of his poetic imagination with which is combined an intellectual curiosity of wide scope and a bold, freshly creative style." At the award ceremony in Stockholm on 10 December 1945 Anders Österling, permanent secretary of the Swedish Academy said:

This child of the dry and windy moors of Jutland has, almost out of spite, astonished his contemporaries by a remarkably prolific production. He could well be considered one of the most fertile Scandinavian writers. He has constructed a vast and imposing literary œuvre, comprising the most diverse genres: epic and lyric, imaginative and realistic works, as well as historical and philosophical essays, not to mention his scientific excursions in all directions.

Jensen had been nominated for the Nobel Prize in Literature 53 times, the first time in 1925. He was nominated every year between 1931 and 1944.

== Legacy ==
Jensen was a controversial figure in Danish cultural life. He was a reckless polemicist and his dubious racial theories have damaged his reputation. However, he never showed any obvious fascist leanings.

Today Jensen is still considered the father of Danish modernism, particularly in the area of modern poetry with his introduction of the prose poem and his use of a direct and straightforward language. His direct influence was felt as late as the 1960s. Without being a Danish answer to Kipling, Hamsun or Sandburg, he bears comparison to all three authors. He combines the outlook of the regional writer with the view of the modern academic and scientific observer.

He was famous for experimenting with the form of his writing, amongst other things, and was an early user of the smiley face, a basic ideogram in popular culture. In a letter sent to publisher Ernst Bojesen in December 1900, he includes both a happy and sad face ideogram. It was in the 1900s that the design evolved from a basic eye and mouth design into a more recognizable design.

In 1999, The Fall of the King (1901) was acclaimed as the best Danish novel of the 20th century by the newspapers Politiken and Berlingske Tidende, independently of each other.

Johannes V. Jensen Land in northern Greenland was named in his honor.

== Bibliography ==
- Danskere, 1896
- Einar Elkjær, 1898
- Himmerlandsfolk, 1898
- Intermezzo, 1899
- Kongens Fald, 1900–1901 – The Fall of the King
- Den gotiske renæssance, 1901
- Skovene, 1904
- Nye Himmerlandshistorier, 1904
- Madame d'Ora, 1904
- Hjulet, 1904
- Digte, 1906
- Eksotiske noveller, 1907–15
- Den nye verden, 1907
- Singaporenoveller, 1907
- Myter, 1907–45
- Nye myter, 1908
- Den lange rejse, 1908–22 – The Long Journey – I: Den tabte land, 1919; II: Bræen, 1908; Norne Gæst, 1919; IV: Cimbrernes tog, 1922; V: Skibet, 1912; VI: Christofer Columbus, 1922
- Lille Ahasverus, 1909
- Himmerlandshistorier, Tredje Samling, 1910
- Myter, 1910
- Bo'l, 1910
- Nordisk ånd, 1911
- Myter, 1912
- Rudyard Kipling, 1912
- Der Gletscher, Ein Neuer Mythos Vom Ersten Menschen, 1912 - The Glacier, A New Myth Of The First Man
- Olivia Marianne, 1915
- Introduktion til vor tidsalder, 1915
- Skrifter, 1916 (8 vols.)
- Årbog, 1916, 1917
- Johannes Larsen og hans billeder, 1920
- Sangerinden, 1921
- Den lange rejse, 1922–24 – The Long Journey
- Æstetik og udviking, 1923
- Årstiderne, 1923
- Hamlet, 1924
- Myter, 1924
- Skrifter, 1925 (5 vols.)
- Evolution og moral, 1925
- Årets højtider, 1925
- Verdens lys, 1926
- Jørgine, 1926
- Thorvaldsens portrætbuster, 1926
- Dyrenes forvandling, 1927
- Åndens stadier, 1928
- Ved livets bred, 1928
- Retninger i tiden, 1930
- Den jyske blæst, 1931
- Form og sjæl, 1931
- På danske veje, 1931
- Pisangen, 1932
- Kornmarken, 1932
- Sælernes ø, 1934
- Det blivende, 1934
- Dr. Renaults fristelser, 1935
- Gudrun, 1936
- Darduse, 1937
- Påskebadet, 1937
- Jydske folkelivsmalere, 1937
- Thorvaldsen, 1938
- Nordvejen, 1939
- Fra fristaterne, 1939
- Gutenberg, 1939
- Mariehønen, 1941
- Vor oprindelse, 1941
- Mindets tavle, 1941
- Om sproget og undervisningen, 1942
- Kvinden i sagatiden, 1942
- Folkeslagene i østen, 1943
- Digte 1901–43, 1943
- Møllen, 1943
- Afrika, 1949
- Garden Colonies in Denmark, 1949
- Swift og Oehlenschläger, 1950
- Mytens ring, 1951
- Tilblivelsen, 1951

=== Works in English ===
- The Long Journey, vol 1–3, (Fire and Ice; The Cimbrians; Christopher Columbus) New York, 1924.
- Jensen, Johannes (1933), The Fall of the King, translated by P. T. Federspiel; Patrick Kirwan, London: Henry Holt and Company, Wikidata Q124218629
- Jensen, Johannes (1958), The Waving Rye, Copenhagen: Gyldendal, Wikidata Q124218987
- Jensen, Johannes (1992), The Fall of the King, translated by Alan G. Bower, Wikidata Q104691326
