= Ranum =

- Town
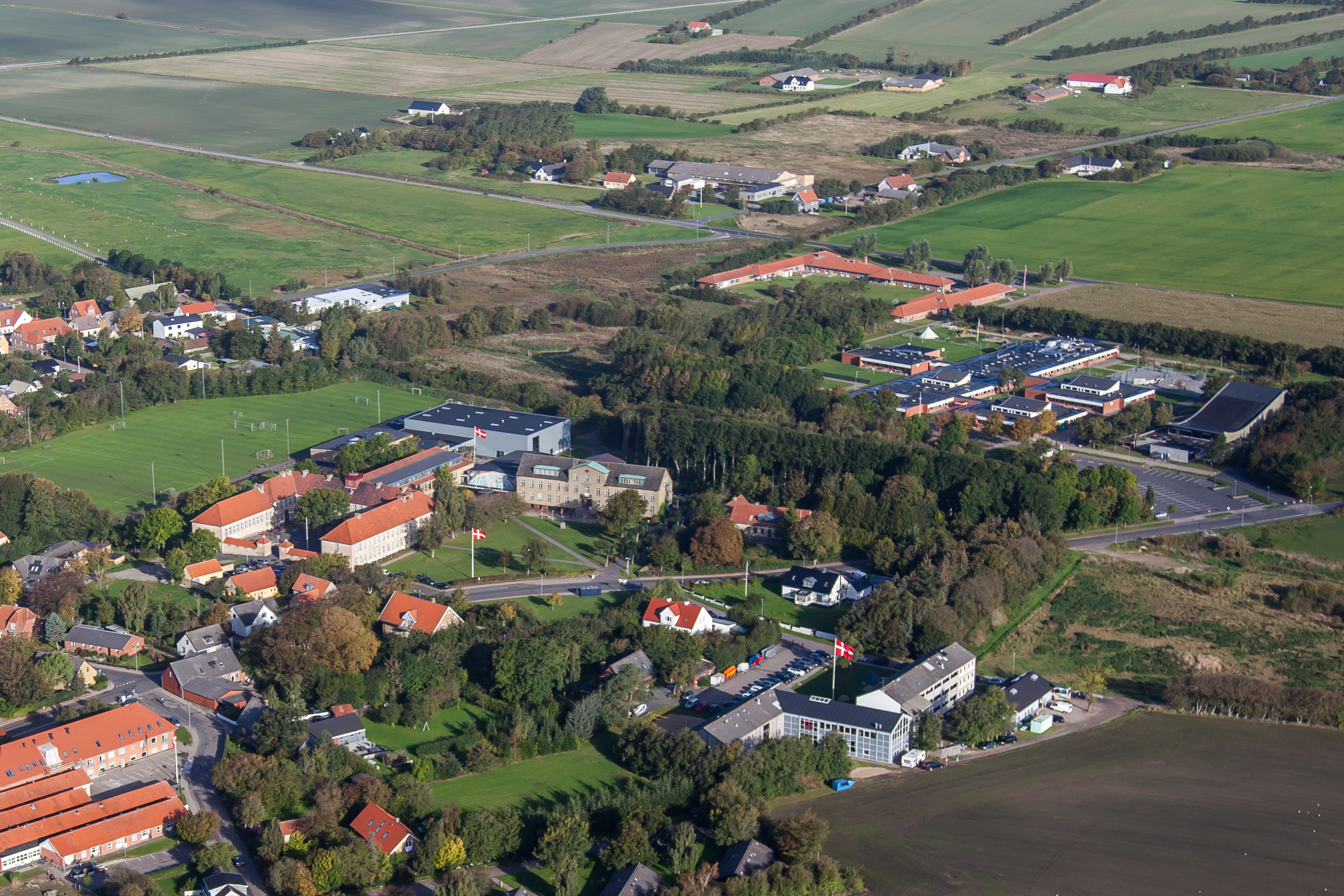
- Aerial photograph of Ranum

- Location in North Jutland Region Ranum (Denmark)
- Coordinates: 56.89678°N 9.22791°E
- Country: Denmark
- Region: North Jutland Region
- Municipality: Vesthimmerland

Population (2026)
  - Total: 929
- Time zone: UTC+1 (CET)
  - Summer (DST): UTC+2 (CEST)

Ranum is a town in the former municipality of Løgstør and Vesthimmerland Municipality in Denmark. It is the fifth largest town in Vesthimmerland Municipality and is situated approximately 3 km from the inlet Limfjorden and 1 hour from the two major cities Aalborg and Viborg. Ranum has a population of 929 (1 January 2026).

== History ==
Ranum was established around the year 1100 and has been an attractive village throughout the last millennium. Ranum is famous for its educational heritage. The first teaching college (lærer seminarium) was established in 1848. The college was closed in 1994 and was a part of VIA University College until 2011. The historic premises is today a part of Ranum Efterskole. Ranum Efterskole is one of the largest efterskoles in Denmark, boarding and teaching more than 400 students every year. Ranum International Summer School is a summer camp of this school which attracts students all over the world.

Vildsted Lake, one of Denmark's biggest nature rehabilitation projects, is located next to Ranum. Vildsted Lake and meadows covers in total 913 hectares and was established (re-created) in 2002–2006. Vildsted Lake is a unique nature resort and resting place for migrating birds. Over 200 bird species have been observed over the past ten years in the lake's southern part. In late summer, you can witness the "Black Sun" phenomenon, when large flocks of starlings roost in the reed beds.

== Shelters and Campsites ==
Along the trail around Vildsted Lake, there are three campsites that are accessible to the public with disability-accessible shelters, access to water and toilets, and campfire facilities. There are campfire sites and parking at all three shelter locations. All motor vehicles, including mopeds, are prohibited on the trails.

The first shelter site is located outside Ranum Søhus. Outside the building is a tent site, there are three shelters with space for 12 people.

A second shelter site is located on Holmen, close to the bird tower in the middle of Vildsted Lake, near the bridge that crosses the lake. This shelter site is equipped with toilets, water, a campsite, and space for 12 people.

A third shelter site is located at Ranumvej 31A, 9670 Løgstør. the site is near Vilsted Klubhus, close to Vildsted Lake. This shelter site is equipped with toilets, water, a campsite, and space for 12 people.
