= Vesthimmerland Municipality =

Vesthimmerland Municipality Vesthimmerlands Kommune (Danish)
- Municipality
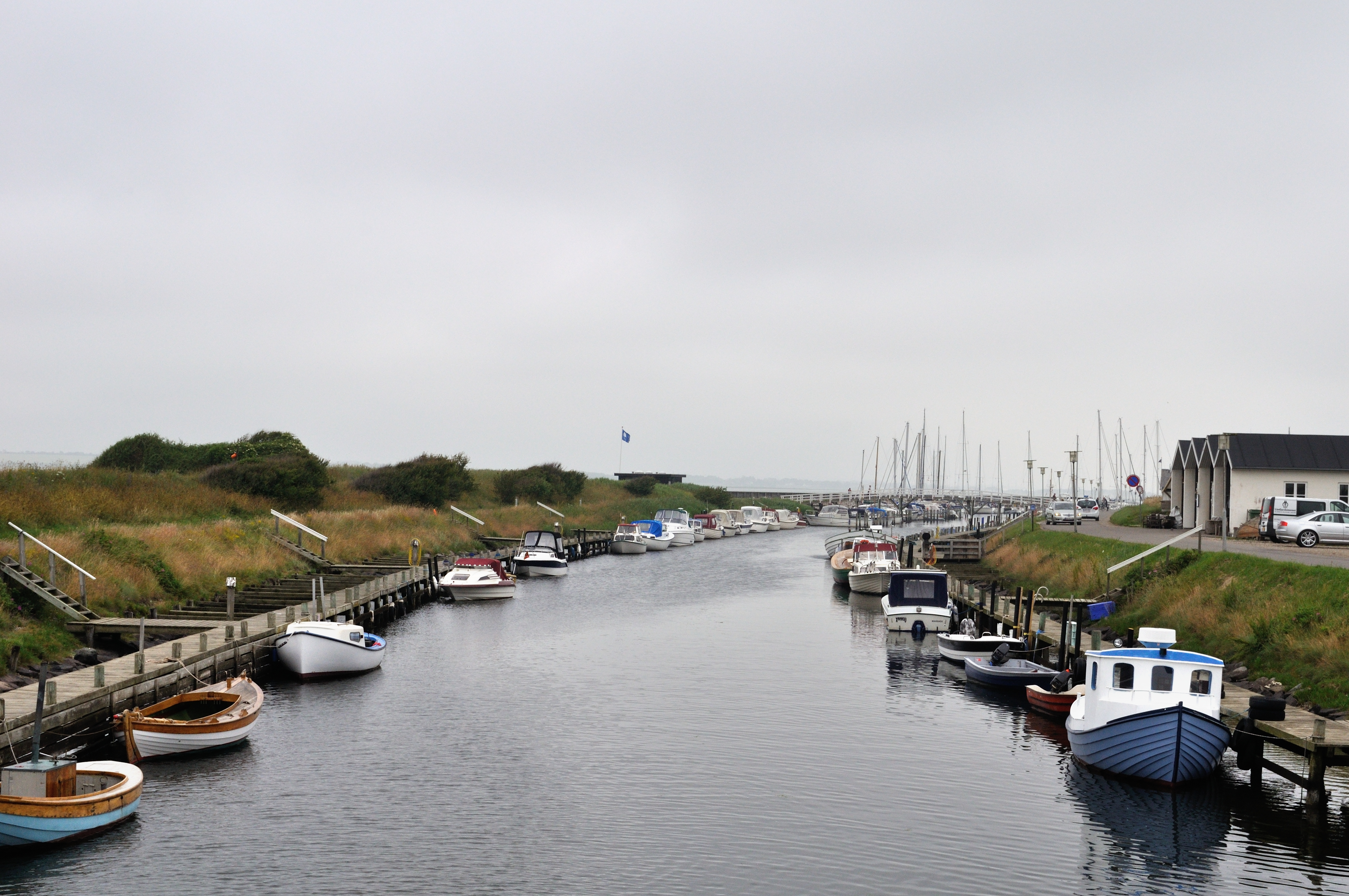

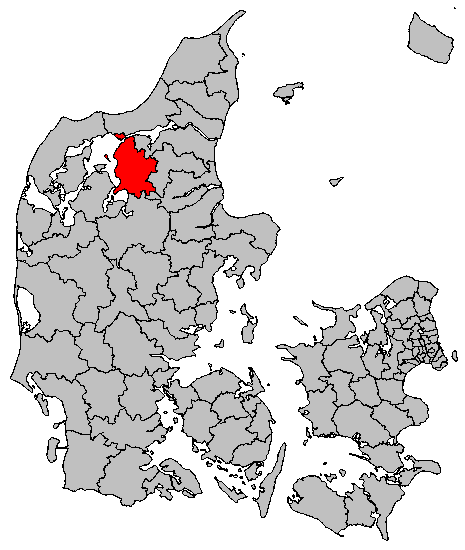
- Coordinates: 56°48′07″N 9°31′23″E
- Country: Denmark
- Region: North Jutland Region
- Current municipality: January 1, 2007
- Seat: Aars

Government
  - Mayor: Per Bach Laursen

Area
  - Total: 768.08 km^{2} (296.56 sq mi)

Population (1 January 2026)
  - Total: 35,632
  - Density: 46.391/km^{2} (120.15/sq mi)
- Time zone: UTC1 (CET)
  - Summer (DST): UTC2 (CEST)
- Website: www.vesthimmerland.dk

Vesthimmerland Municipality (Danish: Vesthimmerlands Kommune) is a kommune in the North Jutland Region of Denmark. It covers an area of 768.08 km^{2} (2013) and has a total population of 35,632 (2026). The Municipality borders Jammerbugt Municipality to the north and to the east it borders Rebild and Aalborg Municipality and to the south it borders Viborg Municipality and to the south-east it borders Mariagerfjord Municipality.

On 1 January 2007, Vesthimmerland municipality was created as the result of Kommunalreformen ("The Municipal Reform" of 2007), consisting of the former municipalities of Aalestrup, Farsø, Løgstør, and Aars.

The municipal seat is the city of Aars, which also was the seat in the former Aars Municipality.

== Four principal towns ==
The municipality's four principal towns (hovedbyer) are Aars, Farsø, Løgstør & Aalestrup, all of them were former municipal seats of their former municipalities.

=== Aars ===
Aars, the municipal seat of Vesthimmerland municipality and the largest town of Vesthimmerland municipality, is located to the east of the three other principal towns. Aars is/was a railway town and was the principal town of Aars Municipality. It has a population of 8,246.

=== Farsø ===
Farsø is a town with a population of 3,299 in Region Nordjylland in Denmark in the Vesthimmerland municipality. It is located west of Aars, south of Løgstør, and north-west of Aalestrup. Until 1 January 2007 Farsø was also a municipality in North Jutland County. The municipality covered an area of 201 km^{2}, and had a total population of 7,991.

=== Løgstør ===
Løgstør is a town with a population of 4,284 and the former seat of Løgstør municipality. It is located north-west of the other principal towns. The former municipality, including the island of Livø, covered an area of 218 km2 (84 sq mi), and had a total population of 10,270.

=== Aalestrup ===
Aalestrup is a town in Vesthimmerland municipality with a population of 2,729. It is the furthest south of all the four principal towns. Aalestrup School has 294 students. It was also a municipal seat until 2007.

== Municipality's largest towns ==
The municipality's largest cities
| Nr | City | Inhabitants | | | From/to 11-16 |
| Nr | City | 2006 | 2011 | 2016 | From/to 11-16 |
| 1 | Aars | 7.457 | 8.010 | 8.116 | +106 |
| 2 | Løgstør | 4.434 | 4.357 | 4.114 | -243 |
| 3 | Farsø | 3.216 | 3.253 | 3.409 | +156 |
| 4 | Aalestrup | 2.736 | 2.760 | 2.761 | +1 |
| 5 | Ranum | 1.152 | 1.108 | 991 | -117 |
| 6 | Hornum | 963 | 971 | 947 | -24 |
| 7 | Gedsted | 1.013 | 930 | 870 | -60 |
| 8 | Hvalpsund | 701 | 669 | 683 | +14 |
| 9 | Vester Hornum | 533 | 566 | 567 | +1 |
| 10 | Overlade | 525 | 515 | 457 | -58 |
| 11 | Strandby | | 328 | 309 | -19 |
| | Municipality | 37.871 | 37.867 | 37.296 | -568 |

== Mayors of Vesthhimmerland ==
| Period | Name | Party |
|---|---|---|
| 2007–2009 | Jens Lauritzen | Venstre |
| 2010–2017 | Knud Vældgaard Kristensen | Det Konservative Folkeparti |
| 2018–present | Per Bach Laursen | Venstre |

== Former municipalities ==
=== Aars Municipality ===
The municipality covers an area of 223 km^{2}, and had a total population of 13,284 (2005). Its latest mayor was Knud V. Christensen, a member of the Conservative People's Party (Det Konservative Folkeparti) political party.

=== Farsø Municipality ===
The municipality covered an area of 201 km^{2}, and had a total population of 7,991 (2005). Its last mayor was H. O. A. Kjeldsen, a member of the Venstre (Liberal Party) political party.

=== Løgstør Municipality ===
The municipality, including the island of Livø, covered an area of 218 km^{2} (84 sq mi), and had a total population of 10,270 (2005). Its last mayor was Jens Lauritzen, a member of the Venstre (Liberal Party) political party.

=== Aalestrup Municipality ===
The municipality covered an area of 176 km^{2}, and had a total population of 7,631 (2005). Its latest mayor was Rigmor Sandborg.

The main town and the site of its municipal council was the town of Aalestrup. The municipality was located on the eastern shores of the area known as Himmerland, a part of the Jutland peninsula; the western border of the municipality was partially defined by the waters of Lovn's Broadening (Lovns Bredning).

== Politics ==
=== Municipal council ===
Næstved's municipal council consists of 27 members, elected every four years.

Below is the current council composition.

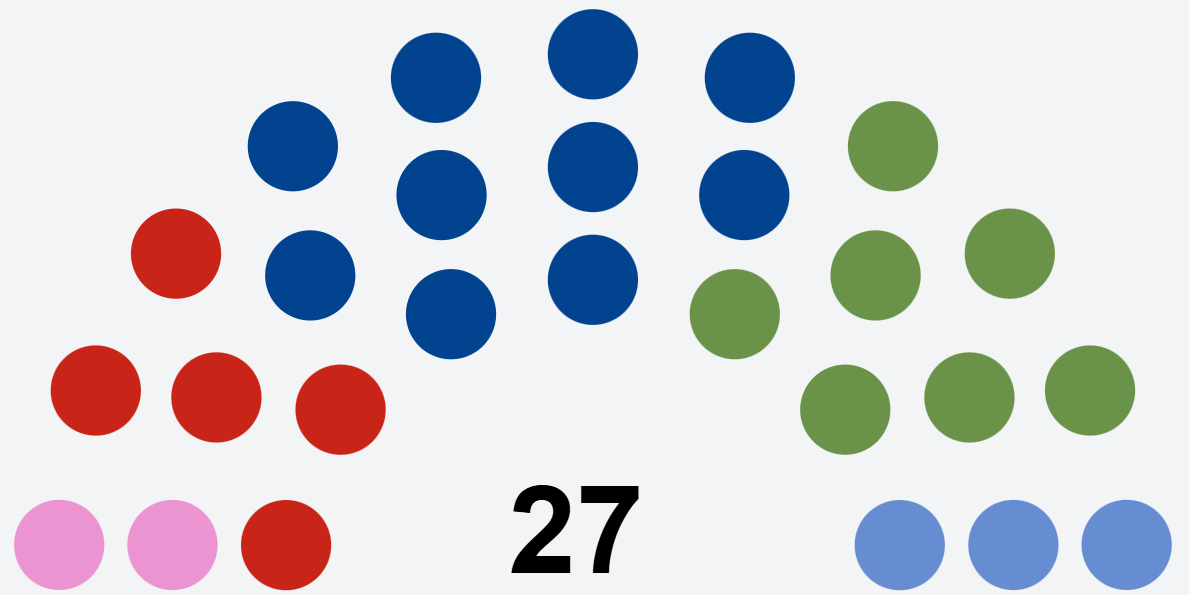

Below are the municipal councils elected between the enactment of the Municipal Reform of 2007 and the 2021 Danish local elections.

| Election | Party | | | | | | | | Total seats | Turnout | Elected mayor |
|---|---|---|---|---|---|---|---|---|---|---|---|
| Election | A | B | C | F | G | L | O | V | Total seats | Turnout | Elected mayor |
| 2005 | 6 | 1 | 7 | 1 | | 1 | 1 | 10 | 27 | 72.3% | Jens Styrbæk Lauritzen (V) |
| 2009 | 6 | 3 | 9 | 2 | | | 1 | 6 | 27 | 69.5% | Knud Vældgaard Kristensen (C) |
| 2013 | 4 | 1 | 10 | 4 | | | 2 | 6 | 27 | 73.8% | Knud Vældgaard Kristensen (C) |
| 2017 | 7 | | 7 | 2 | 1 | | 2 | 8 | 27 | 72.3% | Per Bach Laursen (V) |
Data from Kmdvalg.dk 2005, 2009, 2013 and 2017

== Notable people ==
Not including people included on the Wiki pages for their own towns and villages elsewhere in the municipality

- Knud Erik Pedersen, (Danish Wiki) (born 1934 in Skarp Salling near Løgstør) a Danish author.
- Gert Bo Jacobsen (born 1961 in Østrup near Aars) the former WBO welterweight champion of the world

== Twin towns and sister cities ==
| Lapinlahti, Finland; Mo i Rana, Norway | Skellefteå, Sweden; Sigulda, Latvia |
