= Aalestrup =

Town in Region Nordjylland, Denmark

Aalestrup Ålestrup
- Town
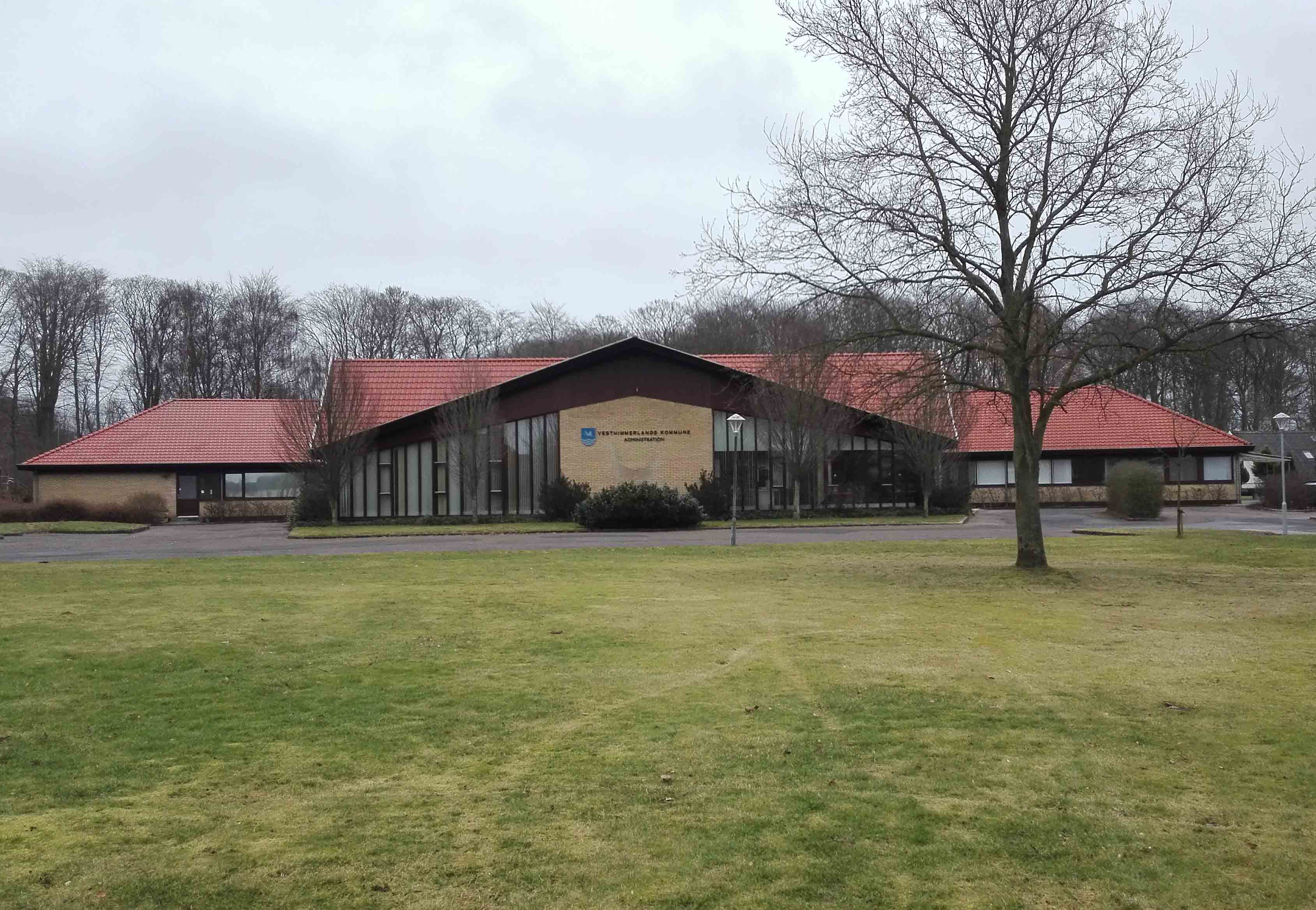
- Town hall of Aalestrup.

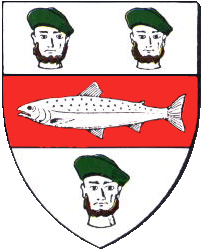
- Coat of arms
- Nickname: Cycle city
- Location in Denmark Aalestrup (North Jutland Region)
- Coordinates: 56°41′38″N 9°29′34″E
- Country: Denmark
- Region: North Denmark
- Municipality: Vesthimmerland

Area
  - Urban: 2.8 km^{2} (1.1 sq mi)

Population (2026)
  - Urban: 2,755
  - Urban density: 980/km^{2} (2,500/sq mi)
- Time zone: UTC+1 (CET)
  - Summer (DST): UTC+1 (CEST)
- Postal code: 9620

Aalestrup is a town in Vesthimmerland Municipality with a population of 2,755 (1 January 2026) in Region Nordjylland in Denmark.

== Facilities ==
Aalestrup School has 294 students, divided into 0.-6. Class stage, as well as the SFO Kvisten. [3] After grade 6, students can continue at Aalestrup Real School, founded in 1904, and is a secondary school with 171 students, divided between 7 and 9. grade. [4] The city also has after-school Aalestrup Nature after school.

Aalestrup Idrætscenter and Friluftsbad have two halls. The open-air swimming pool is open during the 3 summer months, where the 3 basins have 27 ° hot water. In addition, the center has a hostel with 10 rooms and a total of 37 beds. The city also has Hotel Hvide Kro, built in 1902 and has 22 rooms and 3 banquet rooms.

== Aalestrup Municipality ==
Before the Kommunalreformen ("The Municipality Reform" of 2007), Aalestrup municipality was a municipality (Danish, kommune) in Viborg County on the Jutland peninsula in northern Denmark. The municipality covered an area of 176 km^{2} (68 sq mi), and had a total population of 7,631 (2005). Its latest mayor was Rigmor Sandborg.

The main town and the site of its municipal council was the town of Aalestrup. The municipality was located on the eastern shores of the area known as Himmerland, a part of the Jutland peninsula

== Notable people ==
- Astrid Villaume (1923 in Aalestrup – 1995) a Danish actress of stage and film, played title role in the 1950 film Susanne
- Per Bisgaard (born 1955 in Fjelsø) a former teacher, Mayor of Aalestrup 1994–2001, member of the Folketinget
- Niels Guldbjerg (born 1958 in Aalestrup) a Danish retired professional footballer who played 154 games in the North American Soccer League
