= Farsø =

- Town
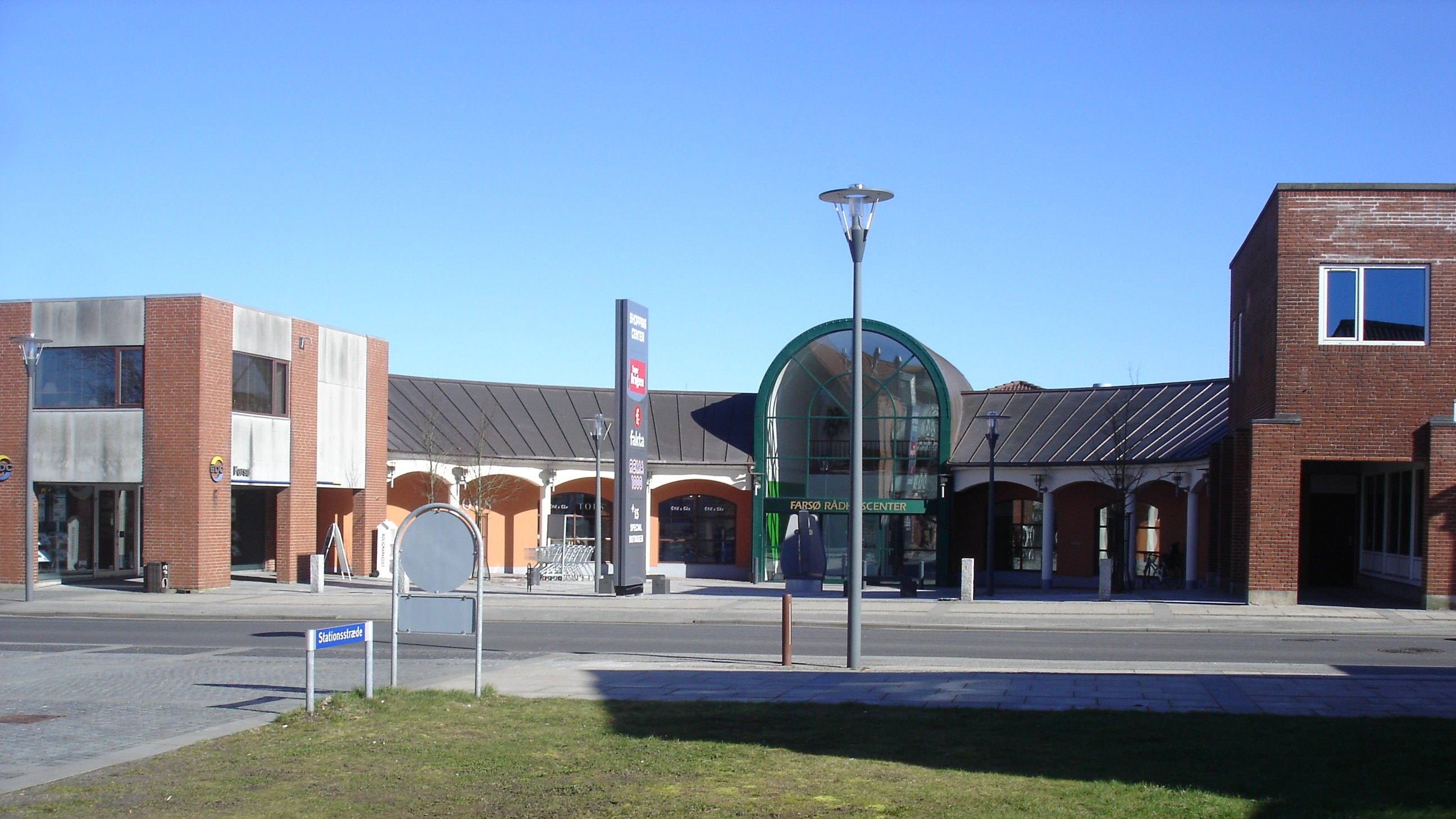
- Farsø City Hall Center.

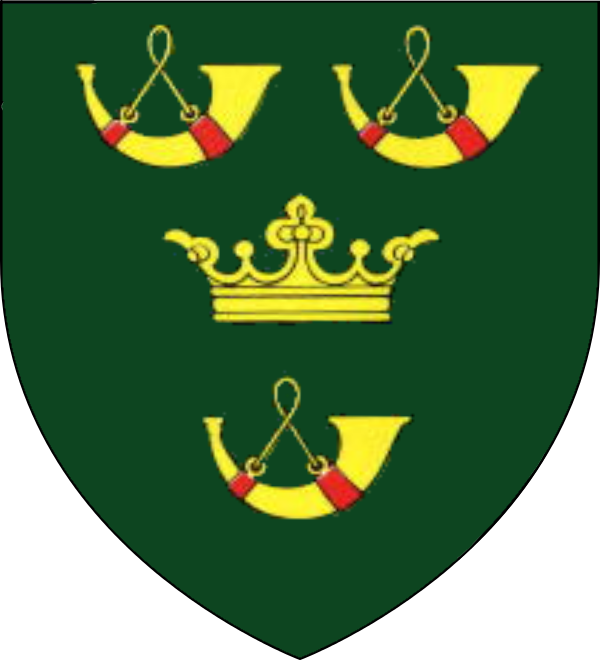
- Coat of arms
- Nickname: The city of the authors
- Location in Denmark Farsø (North Jutland Region)
- Coordinates: 56°46′20″N 9°20′25″E
- Country: Denmark
- Region: Region Nordjylland
- Municipality: Vesthimmerland
- Foundation: 13th century
- Railway town: 1910

Area
  - Urban: 2.9 km^{2} (1.1 sq mi)

Population (2026)
  - Urban: 3,324
  - Urban density: 1,100/km^{2} (3,000/sq mi)
- Time zone: UTC+1 (CET)
  - Summer (DST): UTC+1 (CEST)
- Postal code: DK-9640 Farsø
- Website: http://www.farsoe.dk/

Farsø is a town with a population of 3,324 (1 January 2026) in Region Nordjylland in Denmark in the Vesthimmerland Municipality. Farsø was the birthplace of Johannes Vilhelm Jensen, winner of the Nobel Prize in Literature in 1944. The village of Vognsild is located to the east of Farsø. Farsø is also called one of the head cities of Vesthimmerland Municipality along with Aars, Løgstør and Aalestrup.

== History ==
In 1975, the city was described as follows: "Farsø with church, rectory, School, Pharmacist's retail store, District housing, Veirmølle".

The town of Farsø got a savings bank in 1877. The inn came in 1883, but until 1912, it was only for road users. After the inauguration of Farsø Hospital in 1894, the city went well around 1900, had a meeting house (from 1897), a mission house (from 1898), a pharmacy, district housing, several merchandise and the joint venture.

=== The railway ===
Farsø was stationed at Aalborg-Hvalpsund Railway in 1910. The city's citizens were so proud of the station building that they donated a tower to it. The track was closed in 1969, and the station building was demolished in 1977. The tower is preserved on the tower of the savings bank. The station building's granite portal was also preserved and was restored in Stationsstræde in 2015. This name and road name Stationsvej reminds that the new city center was landed on the station tree. Engvej is located on the track.

== Buildings ==
=== Farsø school ===
Farsø School has 697 students, divided into 0.-9. grade. In 2013, 62 teachers were employed at the school. Pupils from the schools in Ullits, Strandby and Gedsted move mostly to Farsø School when they reach 7th grade, as there are only 6th grade classes in those schools.

=== The Queen Ingrid halls ===
The halls has two sports halls, gymnasium, indoor swimming pool and an auditorium with 117 seats. Sport & Academy organizes training for football, badminton, gymnastics, swimming, handball and golf. Here you can also stay at Hotel Farsø, on the other hand, do not rent rooms but have banqueting rooms that can accommodate up to 400 people. The Danish name is Dronning Ingrid Hallerne which was named after Ingrid of Sweden who was wife of Frederik IX of Denmark.

=== Farsø church ===
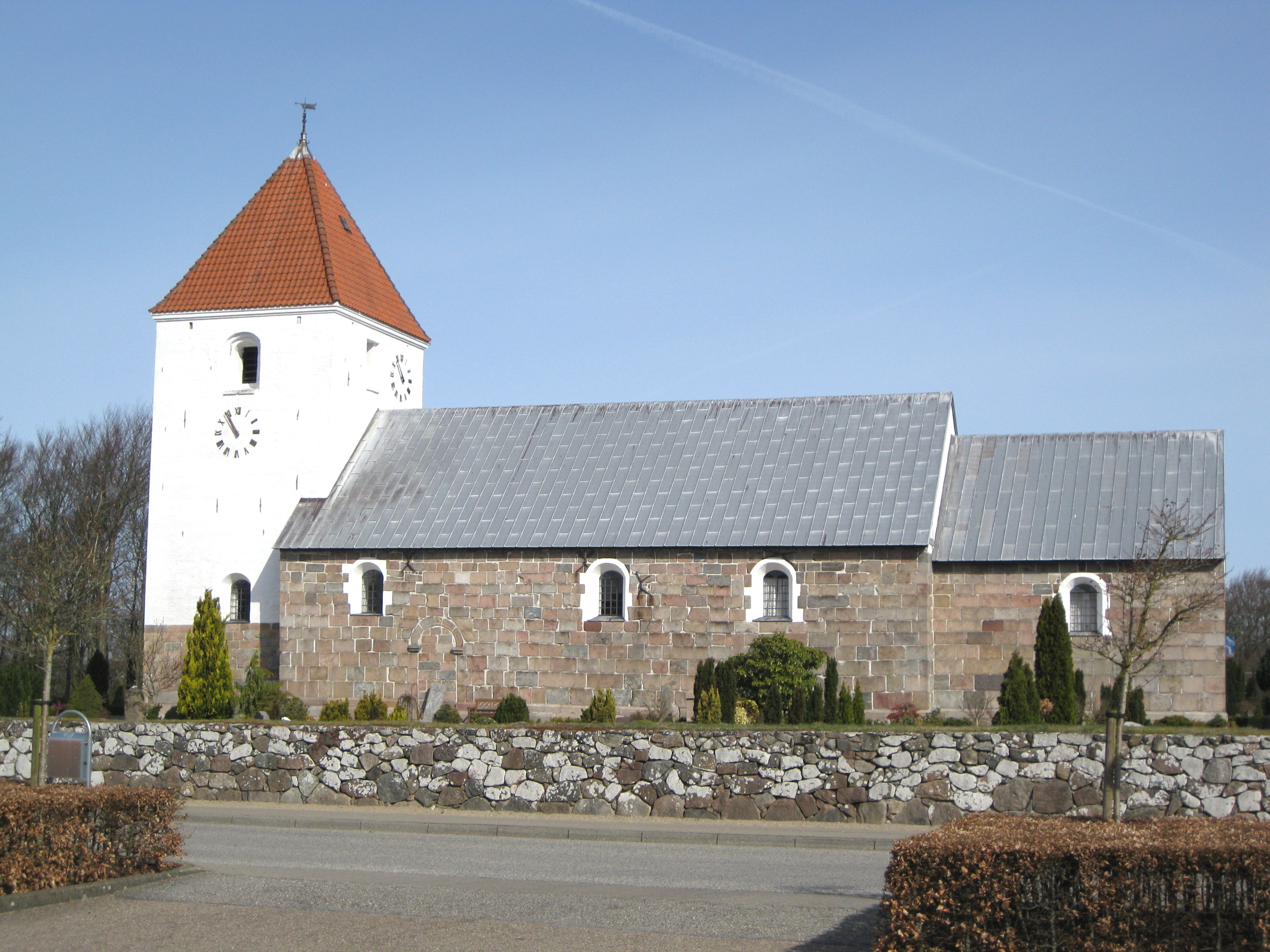
Farsø Church

Farsø is located in Farsø parish, and Farsø Church is located in the town of Farsø. It is a Romanesque church from the 11th century with a late gothic tower and porch. In the chancel, there is a granite font with carvings of lions and human heads; on the ceilings of the nave, there are several paintings made in 1550. In the porch, is the Farsø stone, a runestone, found in 1955 under the tile floor in that was found in connection with the restoration of the church.

== Farsø municipality ==
Until 1 January 2007, Farsø was also a municipality (Danish, kommune) in North Jutland County. The municipality covered an area of 201 km^{2}, and had a total population of 7,991 (2005). Its last mayor was H. O. A. Kjeldsen, a member of the Venstre (Liberal Party) political party.

Farsø municipality ceased to exist as the result of Kommunalreformen ("The Municipality Reform" of 2007). It was merged with Løgstør, Aalestrup, and Aars municipalities to form the new Vesthimmerland municipality. This created a municipality with an area of 815 km^{2} and a total population of 39,176 (2005).

== Coat of arms ==
The coat of arms where first used in Farsø Municipality, and it symbolised the hunting since that Farsø had a royal family's hunting house in Trend (city).

== Notable people ==
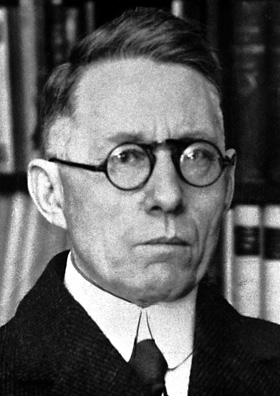
Johannes Vilhelm Jensen, 1944

- Johannes V. Jensen (1873 in Farsø – 1950) was a Danish author, often considered the first great Danish writer of the 20th century. He was awarded the Nobel Prize in Literature in 1944
- Thit Jensen (1876 in Farsø – 1957) a Danish novelist, author of short stories, plays and society-critical articles
- Arne Sørensen (1906 in Hvalpsund, Farsø – 1978) a Danish author and politician
- Christian Ulrik Hansen (1921 in Vannerup, Farsø – executed 1944) a student of theology and member of the Danish resistance
- Knud Vældgaard Kristensen (born 1953 in Farsø) is a retired Danish mason and politician, Mayor of Farsø, 2002/2006
- Jeppe Riddervold (born 1976 in Farsø) a songwriter, entrepreneur and music publisher.
- Torsten Schack Pedersen (born 1976 in Farsø) a Danish politician, first elected to Parliament in 2005

=== Sport ===
- Per Krøldrup (born 1979 in Farsø) a former Danish professional footballer with 288 club caps, played 33 games for the Denmark national football team
- Line Sigvardsen Jensen (born 1991 in Farsø) a football player for the Washington Spirit and for the Danish national team
- Matilde Kondrup Nielsen (born 1995 in Farsø) a Danish handball player for Nykøbing Falster Håndboldklub
- Sara Thrige Andersen (born 1996 in Farsø) a football player for Fortuna Hjørring and for the Danish national team
- Malte Ebdrup (born 2006 in Farsø) a racing driver
