= Himmerland =

Peninsula in Jutland, Denmark

Coordinates: 56°50′N 9°50′E

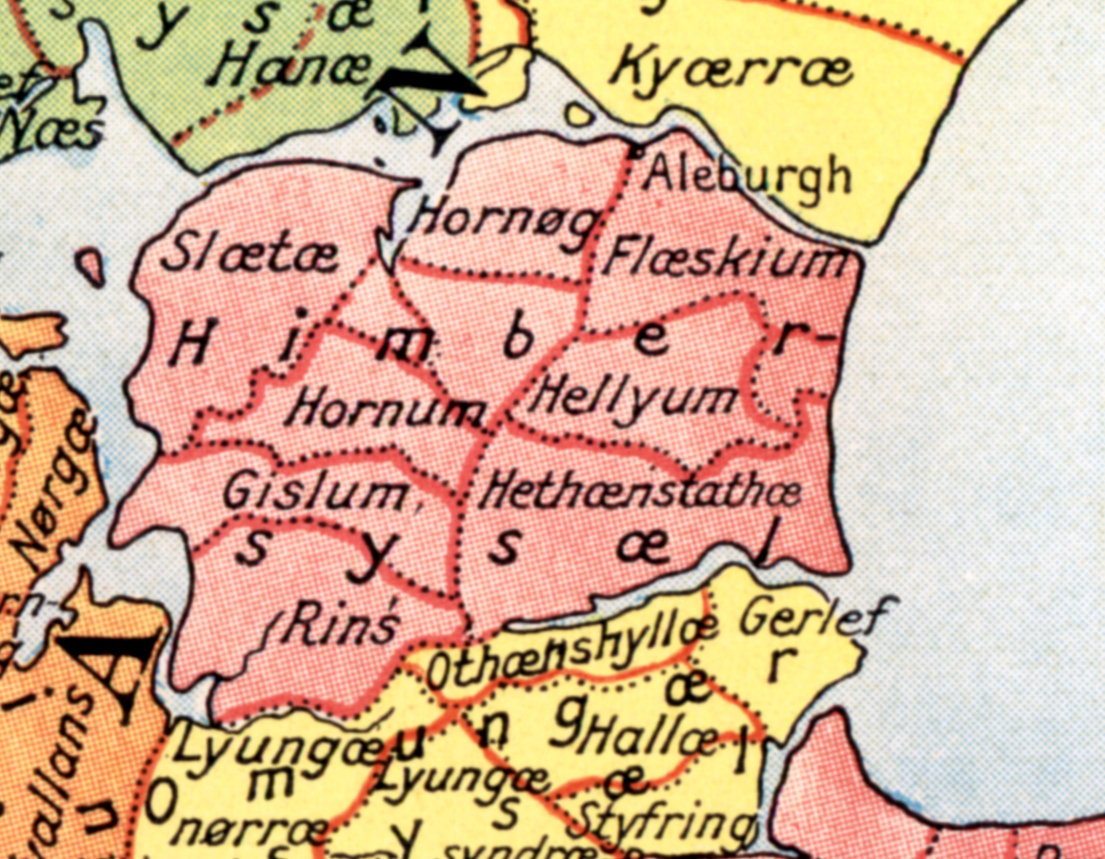
An old map of Himmerland (Himbersysael), between the Limfjord and Mariager Fjord, in Jutland.

Himmerland is a peninsula in northeastern Jutland, Denmark. It is delimited to the north and the west by the Limfjord, to the east by the Kattegat, and to the south by the Mariager Fjord. The largest city is Aalborg; smaller towns include Hobro, Aars, Løgstør, Støvring and Nibe. In northeastern Himmerland is the Lille Vildmose, Denmark's largest raised bog, which sustains a rich bird life of international importance.

== Etymology ==
It is generally assumed that the name Himmerland is derived from the tribe of the Cimbri since, in the Geography of Ptolemy (2nd century AD), the Kimbroi (in Greek Κίμβροι) are located in the northernmost part of the peninsula of Jutland, called Kimbrikē chersonēsos in Greek (Κιμβρική Χερσόνησος). The Latin c and Greek k attest an earlier stage of Germanic in which the Germanic sound shift was not yet completed (*k > *χ > h), or it has been assumed the Latin form may be derived through Celtic which substituted ch for h (Germanic *himbr-, Celtic *chimbr-, Latin cimbr-). If Cimbri (similar to the Welsh word for themselves ‘Cymry’ from ‘combrogi’ - fellow countrymen) were related to other Celtic tribes, the first part of Himmerland might be related in name to the Humber estuary.

== See also ==
- Cimbri
- Cimmerians
- Gundestrup cauldron
- Johannes Vilhelm Jensen
