= Løgstør =

- Town
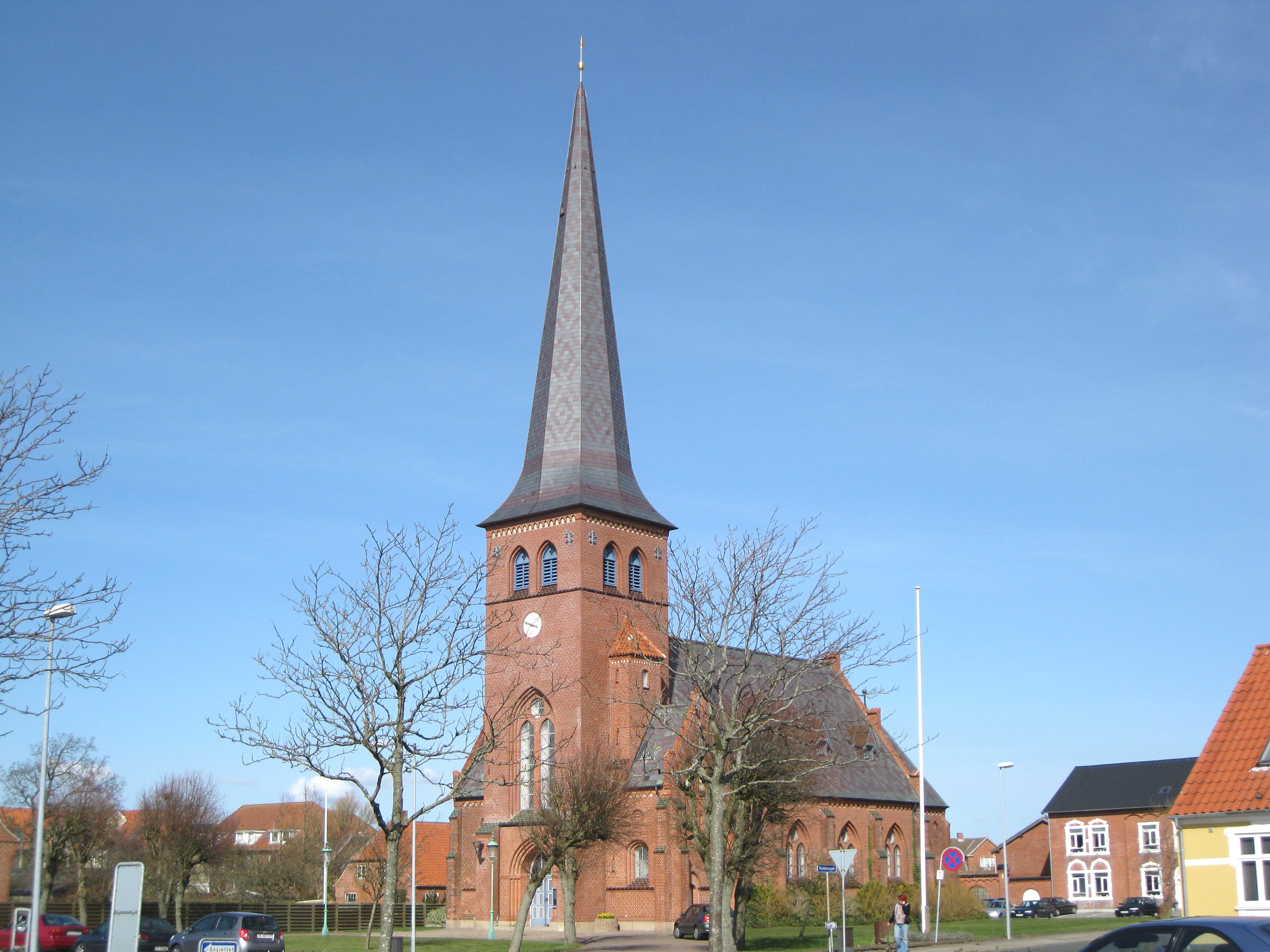
- Løgstør church.

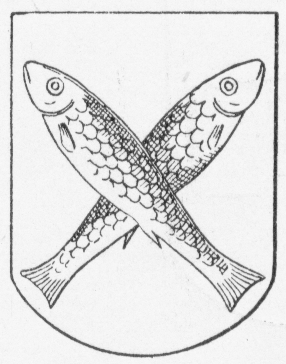
- Seal Coat of arms
- Motto: Løgstør mussel town (Danish: Løgstør muslingebyen)
- Location in Denmark Løgstør (North Jutland Region)
- Coordinates: 56°58′00″N 9°15′30″E
- Country: Denmark
- Region: Region Nordjylland
- Municipality: Vesthimmerland
- Foundation: 16th century

Area
  - Urban: 3.6 km^{2} (1.4 sq mi)

Population (2026)
  - Urban: 3,929
  - Urban density: 1,100/km^{2} (2,800/sq mi)
- Time zone: UTC+1 (CET)
  - Summer (DST): UTC+1 (CEST)
- Postal code: DK-9670 Løgstør
- Website: http://www.muslingebyen.dk/

Løgstør is a town in Denmark with a population of 3,929 (1 January 2026) It is located 47 km west of Aalborg and 64 km north of Viborg. Løgstør's city centre consists of old streets with small houses built in the 19th century for fishermen and sailors. One of these houses was donated by Danish housemen to the author and poet Johan Skjoldborg (1861 - 1936) in 1918, who lived in the house until his death. It is located on Johan Skjoldborgs Vej.

== History ==
The name Løgstør is mentioned for the first time in 1514, where the city is described as a fishing village. Later, the site developed into a charging and trading space, and in 1523 the city became a customs office. Løgstør is an old trading place that, like Nibe, flourished in the 16th century due to its herring markets, but it only got its first merchant's rights in the year 1900. Over and over again, the merchant position from Aalborg set itself counter to neighbouring attempts to expand trade opportunities and create economic growth in the smaller communities. Already in 1598, Aalborgian complaints made a royal ban on Løgstør's spirited trade in grain and ice cream. In 1752, Aalborg's powerful merchants blocked the small harbour town's application, as the merchants once again feared increased competition in the Limfjord area. In 1747 and 1751, Løgstør was ravaged by violent fires, and in these difficulties the population declined, so that in 1769 the city had only 392 inhabitants.

Due to the shallow harbour Løgstør had difficulty finding ships at Løgstør, and even fewer created after Agger Tangs were pierced at Thyborøn in 1825 so that they could now sail into the Limfjord from the North Sea. It was therefore decided to build Frederik VII's Channel and Frederick VII was the king of Denmark. The channel was 4.4 km long, a width of approx. 25 m and a depth of 3 m and walked along the mainland west and southwest of Løgstør, so that it could be added to the shopping district. Several hundred ships passed the Channel every year, and at the end of the 19th century, almost 3,000 vessels arrived. year. A ferry through Løgstør Land was a shortcut to Løgstør Harbour and the canal closed in 1913 to shipping traffic. It was preserved for cultural reasons. Agriculture gradually came to play an increasing role for Løgstør, and trade in agricultural products necessitated a better infrastructure. The harbor was therefore expanded, new roads were built and in 1893 the railway arrived at the city. Seven years later, the city acquired commercial property rights. In 1942 the Aggersund bridge was built over the fjord, and Løgstør's catchment area was expanded to include the southern part of Han Herred.

== Buildings ==
Løgstør Church is a neo-gothic building built in red brick in 1893 with a tall slanting tower facing west. Johan Skjoldborg's grave is in the cemetery.

Close to the harbor lies Løgstør Grunde Fyr, built in 1908. There is a double stove with two wooden towers on a white, brick building. The lighthouse is considered one of the most distinctive lighthouses in Denmark.

Next to the harbour is Hotel du Nord, an old hotel with restaurant.

== Limfjordsskolen ==
Limfjordsskolen in Løgstør is a special education school for young people with disabilities. The school was founded in 1969 by Åndssvageforsorgen, by the then County Council leader in the county of Nordjylland, Leo H. Jensen (1924-1997), who, as the first leader of the Limfjord School, 1969–1976, had also established the pedagogical principles. Limfjordskolen was transferred to the county of Nordjylland in 1980 and since 2007 is operated by Vesthimmerland Municipality. The school has 44 students aged 17-20 + years. The stay is usually 3 years.

== Løgstør municipality ==
Løgstør is also a former municipality (Danish, kommune) in Region Nordjylland on the Jutland Peninsula in northern Denmark. The municipality, including the island of Livø, covered an area of 218 km^{2} (84 sq mi), and had a total population of 10,270 (2005). Its last mayor was Jens Lauritzen, a member of the Venstre (Liberal Party) political party. A bridge connects the former municipality near Tolstrup to the town of Aggersund on the far side of the Agger Strait. The island of Livø lies off the former municipality's western shores, and is partially a protected nature reserve.

On 1 January 2007, Løgstør municipality ceased to exist as a result of Kommunalreformen ("The Municipality Reform" of 2007). It was merged with Farsø, Aalestrup, and Aars municipalities, to form the new Vesthimmerland municipality, with an area of 815 square kilometres (315 sq mi) and a total population of 39,176 (2005).

== Famous people from Løgstør ==
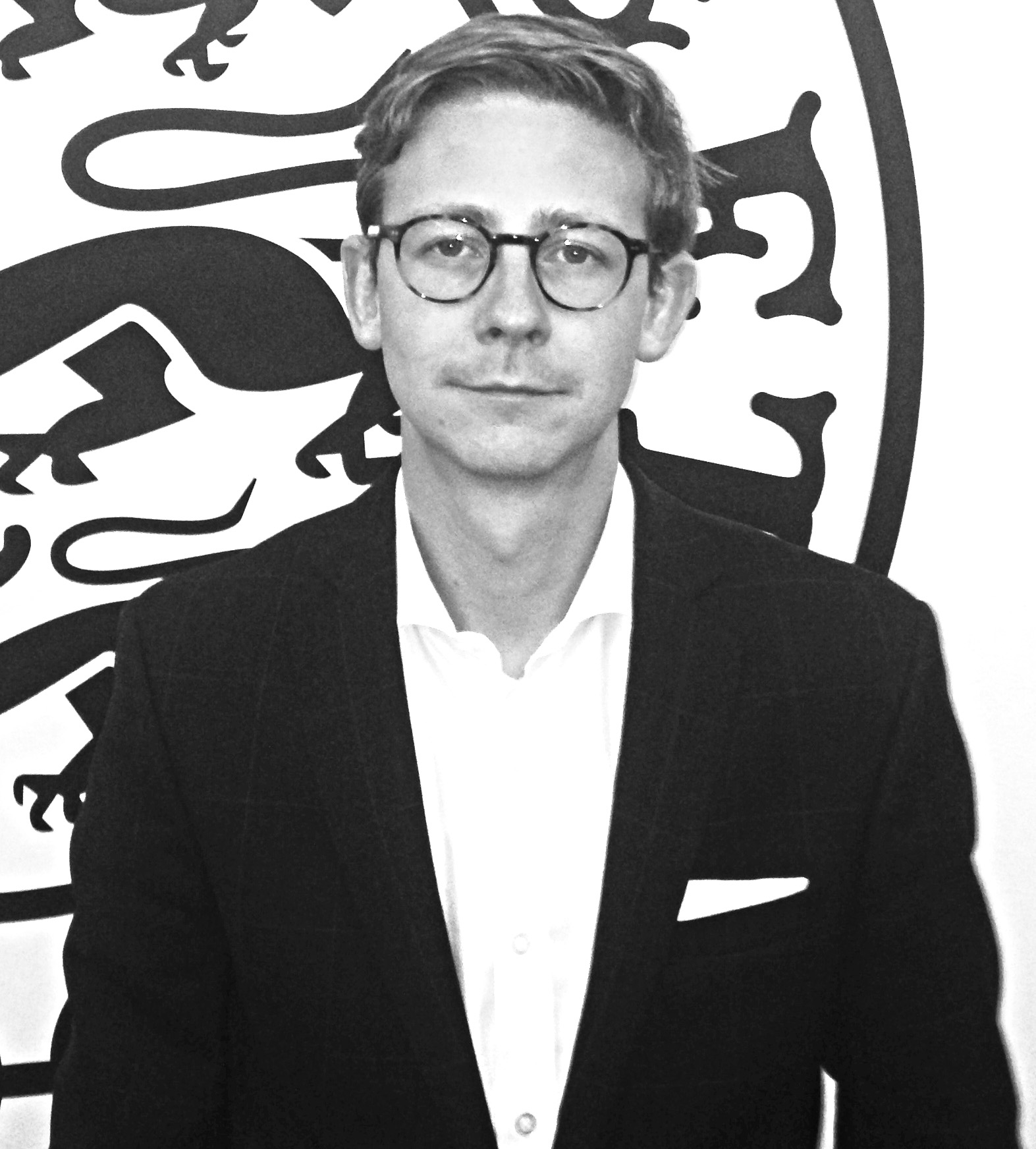
Karsten Lauritzen, 2013

- Peder Horrebow (1679 in Løgstør – 1764) astronomer; the Moon crater Horrebow is named after him
- Christen Lindencrone (1703 in Løgstør - 1772) a Danish landowner and supercargo of the Danish Asia Company
- Johan Skjoldborg (1861–1936) educator, novelist, playwright; lived in Løgstør later in life
- Jørgen Christian Jensen (1891 in Løgstør – 1922) Danish-born Australian recipient of the Victoria Cross
- Arne Ranslet (1931 in Løgstør - 2018) a famous Danish sculptor and ceramist on Bornholm
- Christian Mejdahl (born 1939 at Tverå, Faroe Islands) former chairman of the Danish parliament, lives in Løgstør
- Jens Lauritzen (born 1953 at Nyborg) a Danish politician, Mayor of Løgstør Municipality from 1998, Mayor of the Vesthimmerland Municipality from 2006 to 2010
- Henrik Rasmussen (born 1968 in Løgstør) former professional football player, 322 caps for AaB
- Peter Jensen (born in Løgstør)fashion designer.
- Karsten Lauritzen (born in Løgstør 1983) a Danish Venstre politician and former Tax Minister of Denmark
