= UN/LOCODE:DK =

List of UN/LOCODEs for Denmark

This is a list of UN/LOCODEs for Denmark.

Note:

- DKAUU Aulum and DKAVL Avlum are the same place.
- There are two entries for Brønderslev DKBRO and DKBDV.

Ch	LOCODE	Name	NameWoDiacritics	Function	Status	Date	IATA	Coordinates	Remarks
	DK AAB	Aabenraa	Aabenraa	1-3-----	AF	9606			
	DK AAL	Aalborg	Aalborg	12345---	AF	9606			
	DK ROR	Aalborg Portland Cementfabrikk	Aalborg Portland Cementfabrikk	1-------	RQ	9402			
	DK AEY	Aalestrup	Aalestrup	-23-----	AF	9606			
	DK AZS	Aars	Aars	--3-----	AF	9606			
	DK AAP	Aarup	Aarup	-23-----	AF	9606			
	DK AYB	Åbybro	Abybro	--3-----	RL	0212		5709N 00945E	
	DK AHJ	Åbyhøj/Århus	Abyhoj/Arhus	-23-----	RL	0607		5608N 01010E	
	DK ARK	Ærøskøbing	Aroskobing	1-------	RQ	9402			
	DK AGD	Agerbæk	Agerbak	--3-----	RL	0212		5536N 00848E	
	DK AGO	Agersø	Agerso	1-------	AI	9812			
	DK AGH	Agger Havn	Agger Havn	1-3-----	AF	9606			
	DK ASH	Aggersund	Aggersund	1-------	RQ	9402			
	DK ABT	Albertslund	Albertslund	0-------	RQ	9307			
	DK ABK	Ålebæk	Alebak	--3-----	RL	0507		5701N 01016E	
	DK ALL	Allerød	Allerod	--3-----	RL	0212		5552N 01223E	
	DK ASP	Allestrup	Allestrup	--3-----	RL	0201		5627N 01024E	
	DK ALN	Allingåbro	Allingabro	--3-----	RQ	9501			
¦	DK AGE	Allinge	Allinge	1-3-----	RL	0701		5516N 01448E	@Fun@Sta@Coo
	DK ANH	Anholt	Anholt	1-------	AI	9704			
	DK ANB	Ans by	Ans by	--3-----	RQ	9705			
	DK ANS	Ansager	Ansager	--3-----	RQ	9501			
	DK ADN	Arden	Arden	--3-----	RL	0101			
	DK AAR	Århus	Arhus	12345---	AF	0212		5609N 01013E	
	DK ARO	Åro	Aro	1-------	AI	0212		5516N 00945E	
	DK ARD	Årosund	Arosund	1-------	AI	0212		5515N 00943E	
	DK ASA	Asaa	Asaa	1-3-----	RL	0307		5709N 01025E	
	DK ASK	Askø	Asko	1-------	AI	9812			
	DK ASS	Asnæs	Asnas	--3-----	RQ	0101			
	DK ASV	Asnæsværkets Havn	Asnasvarkets Havn	1-------	AI	9704			
	DK ASN	Assens	Assens	12------	AF	9606			
	DK AUB	Augustenborg	Augustenborg	1-------	AI	9704			
	DK AUU	Aulum	Aulum	--3-----	RQ	9307			
	DK AVE	Avedøreværkets Havn	Avedorevarkets Havn	1-------	RQ	9402			
	DK AVK	Avernak By	Avernak By	1-------	AI	0212		5502N 01016E	
	DK AVL	Avlum	Avlum	--3-----	RL	0201		5615N 00847E	
	DK BGO	Baagø	Baago	1-------	AI	9812			
	DK BLU	Baelum	Baelum	1-3--6--	RL	0601		5649N 01006E	
	DK BAG	Bagenkop	Bagenkop	1-------	AI	9704			
	DK BGS	Bagsværd	Bagsvard	0-------	RQ	9307			
	DK BLB	Ballebro	Ballebro	1-------	AI	9812			
	DK BLP	Ballerup	Ballerup	--3-----	RQ	9705			
	DK BLG	Balling	Balling	--3-----	RQ	9705			
	DK BDX	Bandholm	Bandholm	1-------	AI	9704			
+	DK BED	Beder	Beder	--3-----	RL	0701		5604N 01013E	
	DK BEL	Bellinge	Bellinge	0-------	RQ	9307			
	DK BLL	Billund	Billund	---4----	AI	9601			
	DK BID	Bindslev	Bindslev	--3-----	RQ	9705			
	DK BIR	Birkerod	Birkerod	--3-----	RL	0212		5550N 01226E	
	DK BJB	Bjerringbro	Bjerringbro	--3-----	RQ	9501			
	DK BJE	Bjert Strand	Bjert Strand	--3-----	RL	0201		5526N 00936E	
	DK BLN	Blans	Blans	0-------	RQ	9307			
	DK BKH	Blokhus	Blokhus	--3-----	RL	0201		5715N 00935E	
¦	DK BGZ	Bogense	Bogense	1-3-----	RL	0701		5534N 01005E	@Fun@Sta@Coo
	DK BOG	Bogo By	Bogo By	1-------	AI	0212		5456N 01203E	
¦	DK BOS	Bøjden	Bojden	1-3-----	RL	0701		5506N 01005E	@Fun@Sta@Coo
	DK BDG	Bording	Bording	--3-----	RQ	9501			
	DK BKP	Børkop	Borkop	--3-----	RL	0307		5538N 00938E	
	DK BOR	Borup	Borup	--3-----	RQ	9501			
	DK BTP	Bostrup	Bostrup	0-------	RQ	9307			
	DK BBG	Bøvlingbjerg	Bovlingbjerg	1-3-----	RL	0601		5626N 00812E	
	DK BRB	Brabrand	Brabrand	1-------	RQ	9307			
¦	DK BSU	Brædstrup	Bradstrup	--3-----	RL	0701		5558N 00936E	@Sta
	DK BMG	Bramming	Bramming	-23-----	RQ	9705			
	DK BRA	Brande	Brande	--3-----	RQ	9501			
	DK BRH	Branden Havn	Branden Havn	1-------	AI	9704			
	DK BDE	Branderup	Branderup	--3-----	RQ	0607		5507N 00904E	
	DK BRE	Bredebro	Bredebro	--3-----	RQ	9501			
	DK BRD	Bredsten	Bredsten	--3-----	RQ	9501		5542N 00922E	
	DK BRU	Brenderup, Ejby	Brenderup, Ejby	--3-----	RQ	0607		5528N 00958E	
+	DK BBY	Broby	Broby	--3-----	RL	0701		5514N 01016E	
#	DK BOY	Broby Overdrev	Broby Overdrev	--3--6--	RL	0701		5524N 01136E	@Sta@Coo
	DK BUP	Broderup	Broderup	--3-----	RL	0201		5453N 00915E	
	DK BDY	Brody	Brody	0-------	RQ	9705			
	DK BRY	Brøndby	Brondby	0-------	RQ	9307			
	DK BRO	Brønderslev	Bronderslev	--3-----	RQ	9501			
	DK BDV	Brønderslev	Bronderslev	-23-----	RL	0607		5716N 00957E	
	DK BRP	Brørup	Brorup	--3-----	RQ	9501			
	DK BRT	Brovst	Brovst	--3-----	RL	9806			
	DK BYL	Bylderup	Bylderup	--3-----	RQ	9705			
	DK DAN	Cementfabriken Dania	Cementfabriken Dania	1-------	AI	9704			
	DK KON	Cementfabrikken Kongsdal Havn	Cementfabrikken Kongsdal Havn	1-------	AI	9704			
	DK CSF	Christiansfeld	Christiansfeld	--3-----	RL	0201		5221N 00929E	
#REF!	DK	Copenhagen = København	Copenhagen = Kobenhavn						
	DK DLB	Dalby	Dalby	--3-----	RQ	9705			
	DK DAL	Dalmose	Dalmose	-23-----	RL	0207		5517N 01124E	
	DK DAS	Dansk Salts Havn	Dansk Salts Havn	1-------	RQ	9402			
	DK DIA	Dianalund	Dianalund	-23-----	RL	0207		5532N 01129E	
	DK DKD	Dokkedal	Dokkedal	--3-----	RQ	9501			
	DK DRA	Dragør	Dragor	1-------	RL	8401		5535N 01240E	
	DK DLD	Dronninglund	Dronninglund	--3-----	RL	0207		5709N 01017E	
	DK DRS	Drosby	Drosby	0-------	RQ	9307			
	DK DRP	Durup	Durup	--3-----	RQ	9705			
	DK EBT	Ebeltoft	Ebeltoft	1-------	RQ	9506			
	DK EGA	Egå	Ega	-23–6--	RL	0501		5613N 01016E	
	DK EGN	Egense	Egense	1-------	AI	0002			
	DK END	Egernsund	Egernsund	1-3-----	AI	9704			
	DK EGV	Egtved	Egtved	--3-----	RL	0201		5537N 00918E	
	DK EJY	Ejby	Ejby	--3-----	RQ	9501			
	DK EJS	Ejstrup	Ejstrup	--3-----	RQ	9705			
	DK EDL	Endelave	Endelave	1-------	AI	9704			
	DK ENV	Engesvang	Engesvang	--3-----	RQ	9501			
	DK ENS	Enstedværket Havn	Enstedvarket Havn	1-------	AI	0212		5501N 00926E	
	DK EBJ	Esbjerg	Esbjerg	1234----	AF	9606			
	DK ESP	Espergærde	Espergarde	--3-----	RL	0212		5559N 01232E	
	DK FAA	Faaborg	Faaborg	1-------	RL	8401			
	DK FVJ	Faarevejle	Faarevejle	--3-----	RQ	9705			
	DK FUP	Faarup	Faarup	--3-----	RQ	9705			
	DK FVG	Faarvang	Faarvang	--3-----	RQ	9705			
	DK FAK	Fakse Ladeplads Havn	Fakse Ladeplads Havn	1-------	AI	9704			
	DK FSO	Farsø	Farso	--3-----	RQ	9705			
	DK FRM	Farum	Farum	--3-----	RQ	9705			
	DK FGS	Feggesund	Feggesund	1-------	AI	9812			
	DK FEJ	Fejø	Fejo	1-------	AI	9704			
	DK FMO	Femø	Femo	1-------	AI	9812			
	DK FER	Ferritslev	Ferritslev	1-3-----	RL	0601		5518N 01035E	
	DK FTL	Ferritslev	Ferritslev	--3--6--	RQ	0607		5518N 01035E	
	DK FJV	Fjerritslev	Fjerritslev	--3-----	RQ	9705			
	DK FNS	Fornæs	Fornas	--3-----	RQ	9811			
	DK FRA	Fraugde	Fraugde	--3-----	RL	0212		5521N 01030E	
	DK FRE	Fredensborg	Fredensborg	-23-----	AF	9606			
	DK FRC	Fredericia	Fredericia	12–5---	AF	9606			
	DK FBG	Frederiksberg	Frederiksberg	--3-----	RQ	9501			
	DK FDH	Frederikshavn	Frederikshavn	12------	AF	9606			
	DK FDS	Frederikssund	Frederikssund	123-----	AF	0401		5550N 01204E	
	DK FDV	Frederiksværk	Frederiksvark	12------	AF	9606			
	DK FUG	Fuglebjerg	Fuglebjerg	--3-----	RL	0207		5518N 01132E	
	DK FUH	Fur	Fur	1-------	AI	9704			
	DK FYH	Fynshav	Fynshav	1-3-----	AI	0207		5458N 00958E	
¦	DK GBJ	Gadbjerg	Gadbjerg	-23-----	RL	0701		5546N 00919E	@Fun@Sta
	DK GLT	Galten	Galten	--3-----	RQ	9501			
	DK GBY	Gamby	Gamby	0-------	RQ	9307			
	DK GED	Gedser	Gedser	12------	RL	8401			
	DK GDS	Gedsted	Gedsted	--3-----	RQ	9705			
+	DK GDV	Gedved	Gedved	--3-----	RL	0701		5556N 00951E	
	DK GLD	Gelsted	Gelsted	--3-----	RL	0201		5524N 00957E	
	DK GLE	Gilleleje	Gilleleje	--3-----	RL	9811			
¦	DK GIS	Gislinge	Gislinge	-23-----	RL	0701		5544N 01132E	@Fun@Sta@Coo
	DK GSP	Gistrup	Gistrup	--3--6--	RL	0601		5700N 01000E	
	DK GTR	Gistrup	Gistrup	--3-----	RQ	0607		5659N 00959E	
	DK GIV	Give	Give	--3-----	RQ	9501			
	DK GJR	Gjerlev	Gjerlev	--3-----	RQ	9705			
	DK GJN	Gjern	Gjern	--3-----	RQ	9705			
	DK GJS	Gjessing	Gjessing	0-------	RQ	9307			
	DK GLM	Glamsbjerg	Glamsbjerg	--3-----	RQ	9501			
	DK GLB	Gleibjerg	Gleibjerg	0-------	RQ	9307			
	DK GLS	Glostrup	Glostrup	--3-----	RQ	9501			
	DK GLY	Glyngøre	Glyngore	1-------	RL	8401			
	DK GRG	Gording	Gording	--3-----	RL	0212		5529N 00848E	
	DK GLV	Gorlev	Gorlev	--3-----	RL	0212		5532N 01114E	
	DK GRS	Græsted	Grasted	--3-----	RL	0212		5604N 01217E	
	DK GRA	Gråsten	Grasten	1-------	AI	9704			
	DK GRD	Gredstedbro	Gredstedbro	--3-----	RQ	9501			
	DK GRE	Grenaa	Grenaa	123-----	AF	9606			
	DK GRV	Greve	Greve	--3-----	RL	0201		5535N 01214E	
+	DK GVS	Grevinge	Grevinge	-23-----	RL	0701		5548N 01132E	
	DK GRI	Grimstrup	Grimstrup	--3-----	RQ	9501			
	DK GRN	Grindsted	Grindsted	--3-----	RQ	9501			
	DK GUD	Gudbjerg	Gudbjerg	--3-----	RQ	9501			
¦	DK GDM	Gudhjem	Gudhjem	1-3-----	RL	0701		5513N 01458E	@Fun@Sta@Coo
	DK GFH	Gulfhavn	Gulfhavn	1-------	AI	9704			
	DK HBY	Haarby	Haarby	0-------	RQ	9307			
	DK HAD	Haderslev	Haderslev	1-------	AI	9704			
+	DK HDP	Haderup	Haderup	--3-----	RL	0701		5623N 00859E	
	DK HDS	Hadsten	Hadsten	--3-----	RQ	9501			
	DK HSU	Hadsund	Hadsund	1-3-----	AI	9704			
	DK HAS	Hals	Hals	1-------	AI	0201			
	DK HKV	Halsskov	Halsskov	--3-----	RL	9811			
	DK HME	Hammel	Hammel	--3-----	RQ	9501			
	DK HPN	Hampen	Hampen	-----6--	RL	0601		5601N 00921E	
	DK HAN	Hanstholm	Hanstholm	1-3-----	AI	9704			
	DK HBR	Harboøre	Harboore	-23-----	RL	0207		5637N 00811E	
	DK HDH	Hardeshøj	Hardeshoj	1-------	AI	9812			
	DK HAA	Hårlev	Harlev	-2------	RL	0207		5520N 01214E	
	DK HSL	Hasle	Hasle	1-------	AI	9704			
	DK HSV	Haslev	Haslev	-23-----	AF	9606			
	DK HSS	Hasselager	Hasselager	0-------	RQ	9307			
	DK HTT	Hatting	Hatting	-2------	RQ	9705			
	DK HAP	Havdrup	Havdrup	-2------	RL	0207		5532N 01206E	
	DK HNB	Havneby	Havneby	1-------	AI	9704			
	DK HVG	Havnegade	Havnegade	0-------	RQ	9307			
	DK HVN	Havnsø	Havnso	1-------	AI	9704			
	DK HHS	Hedehusene	Hedehusene	--3-----	RQ	9501			
	DK HED	Hedensted	Hedensted	--3-----	RQ	9501			
	DK HRP	Hellerup	Hellerup	--3-----	RL	0002			
	DK HLE	Hellested	Hellested	--3-----	RQ	9501			
	DK HEL	Helsinge	Helsinge	--3-----	RQ	0101			
	DK HLS	Helsingør	Helsingor	12------	AF	9606			
	DK HFE	Herfølge	Herfolge	--3-----	RL	0004			
	DK HRV	Herlev	Herlev	--3-----	RQ	9705			
	DK HER	Herning	Herning	1-------	RL	8401			
	DK HIL	Hillerod	Hillerod	--3-----	RL	0212		5556N 01219E	
	DK HNN	Hinnerup	Hinnerup	-2------	RQ	9705			
	DK HIR	Hirtshals	Hirtshals	1-------	AI	9704			
	DK HJM	Hjerm	Hjerm	--3-----	RL	0207		5625N 00837E	
	DK HJT	Hjerting	Hjerting	1-3-----	RL	0307		5531N 00822E	
	DK HJG	Hjørring	Hjorring	--3-----	RQ	9501			
+	DK JOK	Hjortshoj	Hjortshoj	--3-----	RL	0701		5615N 01016E	
	DK HBO	Hobro	Hobro	1-------	AI	9704			
	DK HGL	Hogelund	Hogelund	--3-----	RL	0212		5512N 00921E	
	DK HJB	Højbjerg	Hojbjerg	0-------	RQ	0201			
	DK HJE	Højer	Hojer	--3-----	RQ	9705			
	DK HBK	Holbæk	Holbak	1-------	AI	9704			
	DK HOL	Holeby	Holeby	--3-----	RQ	9501			
	DK HOO	Holme-Olstrup	Holme-Olstrup	-2------	RL	0207		5515N 01150E	
	DK HSB	Holstebro	Holstebro	1-------	RL	8401			
	DK HST	Holsted	Holsted	--3-----	RQ	9705			
	DK HOE	Holte	Holte	--3-----		0212			
	DK HNG	Hong	Hong	--3-----	RL	0212		5531N 01118E	
	DK HRN	Hørning	Horning	--3-----	RQ	9501			
¦	DK HSY	Hornsyld	Hornsyld	--3-----	RL	0701		5545N 00952E	@Sta@Coo
	DK HOR	Horsens	Horsens	1-------	AI	9704			
	DK HHM	Hørsholm	Horsholm	--3-----	RL	9811			
	DK HRU	Hørup	Horup	--3-----	RL	0002			
	DK HOH	Hou Havn	Hou Havn	1-------	AI	9704			
	DK HBG	Houborg	Houborg	0-------	RQ	9307			
+	DK HSD	Høve Strand	Hove Strand	--3-----	RL	0701		5551N 01130E	
+	DK HOV	Hovedgård	Hovedgard	-23-----	RL	0701		5557N 00958E	
#	DK HBA	Humlebæk	Humlebak	123-----	RL	0701		5558N 01231E	@Fun@Sta@Coo
	DK HUN	Hundested	Hundested	123-----	AF	9606			
	DK HUR	Hurup	Hurup	--3-----	RQ	9501			
	DK HVA	Hvalpsund	Hvalpsund	1-------	AI	9704			
	DK HVS	Hvide Sande	Hvide Sande	1-3-----	RL	0607		5559N 00808E	
	DK HVV	Hvidovre	Hvidovre	--3-----	RQ	9705			
	DK IKA	Ikast	Ikast	-23-----	AF	9606			
	DK ISJ	Ishøj	Ishoj	0-------	RQ	9307			
+	DK JAE	Jægersborg	Jagersborg	--3-----	RL	0701		5546N 01233E	
	DK JSD	Jersie Strand	Jersie Strand	--3-----	RL	0212		5531N 01213E	
	DK JRD	Jordløse	Jordlose	--3-----	RQ	9705			
	DK JUE	Juelsminde	Juelsminde	1-------	AI	0212		5542N 01001E	
	DK JRP	Jyderup	Jyderup	-23-----	RL	9806			
	DK JYL	Jyllinge	Jyllinge	--3-----	RL	0207		5545N 01206E	
	DK KAL	Kalundborg	Kalundborg	12------	AF	9606			
	DK KAR	Karlslunde	Karlslunde	1-3-----	RL	0407		5534N 01214E	
	DK KRP	Karup	Karup	---4----	AI	9601			
	DK KTP	Kastrup	Kastrup	1-------	AI	9704		5538N 01238E	
	DK KTD	Kerteminde	Kerteminde	1-------	AI	9704			
	DK KIB	Kibæk	Kibak	--3-----	RQ	9501			
	DK KRB	Kirkeby	Kirkeby	--3-----	RQ	9501			
	DK KEP	Kirke-Eskilstrup	Kirke-Eskilstrup	--3-----	RL	9806			
	DK KJE	Kjellerup	Kjellerup	--3-----	RQ	9501			
+	DK KLP	Kleppen	Kleppen	1-3-----	RL	0701		5632N 00835E	
	DK KPV	Kliplev	Kliplev	--3-----	RQ	9501			
	DK KVB	Klovborg	Klovborg	--3-----	RQ	9501			
	DK KNB	Knebel	Knebel	--3-----	RQ	9501			
	DK KHV	Knudshoved	Knudshoved	1-------	RQ	0407			
	DK CPH	København	Kobenhavn	12345---	AF	9606			
	DK KOG	Køge	Koge	12------	AF	9606			
	DK KOK	Kolby Kås	Kolby Kas	1-------	AI	0212		5548N 01033E	
	DK KOL	Kolding	Kolding	123-----	AF	9606			
¦	DK KLD	Kolind	Kolind	-23-----	RL	0701		5622N 01035E	@Fun@Sta@Coo
	DK KDM	Kollund Mole	Kollund Mole	1-3-----	AA	0607		5420N 00927E	
	DK SOK	Kongerslev	Kongerslev	--3-----	RL	0212		5653N 01007E	
	DK KRR	Korsør	Korsor	12------	AF	9606			
	DK KRA	Kragenæs	Kragenas	1-------	AI	9704			
	DK KRS	Kruså	Krusa	-23-----	AF	9606			
	DK KVR	Kværndrup	Kvarndrup	1-------	RQ	9307			
	DK KVG	Kvistgaard	Kvistgaard	--3-----	RQ	9705			
	DK KBY	Kyndbyvaerkets Havn	Kyndbyvaerkets Havn	1-------	AI	9704			
	DK LAN	Langå	Langa	-23-----	RL	0207		5623N 00953E	
	DK LGS	Langeskov	Langeskov	-23-----	AF	9606			
	DK LAA	Låsby	Lasby	--3-----	RQ	9501			
	DK LEJ	Lejre	Lejre	--3-----	RL	0607		5536N 01158E	
	DK LEM	Lem	Lem	--3-----	RL	0207		5601N 00822E	
	DK LVG	Lemvig	Lemvig	1-------	AI	9704			
	DK LLS	Lille Skensved	Lille Skensved	-23-----	AF	9606			
	DK LIN	Lindø Havn	Lindo Havn	1-------	AI	9704			
	DK LGR	Løgstør	Logstor	1-------	AI	9704			
	DK LOG	Løgstrup	Logstrup	--3-----	RQ	9501			
	DK LKO	Løgumkloster	Logumkloster	--3-----	RQ	9501			
	DK LOH	Lohals	Lohals	1-------	AI	9704			
	DK LIG	Losning	Losning	--3-----	RL	0212		5548N 00942E	
+	DK LUN	Lundeborg	Lundeborg	1-3-----	RL	0701		5508N 01047E	
	DK LND	Lunderskov	Lunderskov	--3-----	RQ	9705			
	DK LYN	Lyngby	Lyngby	--3-----	RQ	9705			
	DK LNE	Lynge	Lynge	--3-----	RL	9806			
	DK LYO	Lyngs Odde Havn	Lyngs Odde Havn	1-------	AI	9704			
	DK MLV	Måløv	Malov	-23-----	RL	0212		5545N 01220E	
	DK MRB	Marbæk Havn	Marbak Havn	1-------	AI	9704			
¦	DK MRR	Mariager	Mariager	123-----	RL	0701		5639N 01000E	@Fun@Sta@Coo
	DK MRV	Maribo	Maribo	--34----	AI	9811			
	DK MAR	Marslev	Marslev	--3-----	RQ	9501			
	DK MRS	Marstal	Marstal	1-------	AI	9704			
	DK MAS	Masnedø	Masnedo	1-------	AI	9704			
	DK MKH	Masnedovaerkets Havn/Vordingborg	Masnedovaerkets Havn/Vordingborg	1-3-----	RL	0507		5458N 01153E	
¦	DK MNS	Masnedsund	Masnedsund	1-3-----	RL	0701		5500N 01155E	@Fun@Sta@Coo
	DK UNX	Masnedsund Godningshamn	Masnedsund Godningshamn	1-------	AI	0212		5500N 01155E	
	DK MID	Middelfart	Middelfart	12------	AF	9606			
	DK MUP	Moldrup	Moldrup	--3-----	RQ	9705			
	DK MOM	Mommark	Mommark	1-------	AI	9704			
	DK MKE	Morke	Morke	--3-----	RL	0212		5620N 01023E	
	DK MRU	Mundelstrup	Mundelstrup	--3-----	RQ	9705			
	DK MNK	Munkebo	Munkebo	--3-----	RL	0106		5527N 01033E	
	DK NRM	Nærum	Narum	--3-----	RL	0212		5549N 01233E	
	DK NUD	Næssund	Nassund	1-------	AI	9812			
	DK NVD	Næstved	Nastved	123-----	AF	9606			
	DK NGB	Nagbol	Nagbol	123-----	RL	0601		5527N 00917E	
	DK NAK	Nakskov	Nakskov	12------	AF	9606			
	DK NEX	Neksø	Nekso	1-------	AI	9704			
	DK NIB	Nibe	Nibe	--3-----	RQ	9501			
	DK NAG	Nørager	Norager	--3-----	RL	0207		5642N 00938E	
¦	DK NBR	Nordborg	Nordborg	--3-----	RL	0701		5502N 00948E	@Fun@Sta@Coo
	DK NDB	Nordby Havn, Fanø	Nordby Havn, Fano	1-------	AI	9704			
	DK NKV	Nordenskov	Nordenskov	--3-----	RQ	9501			
	DK VSV	Norjyllandsvarkets havn	Norjyllandsvarkets havn	1-------	AI	9704			
	DK NRE	Nørre Aaby	Norre Aaby	12------	AF	9606			
	DK NAV	Norre Alslev	Norre Alslev	--3-----	RQ	9705			
	DK NSD	Nørre Snede	Norre Snede	1-3-----	RL	0207		5557N 00923E	
	DK NRV	Norre Vium	Norre Vium	--3-----	RL	0212		5602N 00843E	
	DK NBE	Nørreballe	Norreballe	-23-----	RL	0401		5448N 01126E	
	DK NRS	Nørresundby	Norresundby	12------	AF	9606			
	DK NBG	Nyborg	Nyborg	12------	AF	9606			
	DK NYF	Nykøbing Falster	Nykobing Falster	123-----	AF	0401		5446N 01153E	
	DK NYM	Nykøbing Mors	Nykobing Mors	1-3-----	AI	0401		5648N 00852E	
	DK NTD	Nysted	Nysted	1-------	AI	9704			
	DK ODX	Odder	Odder	--3-----	RL	0207		5558N 01009E	
	DK ODE	Odense	Odense	1234----	AF	9606			
	DK OLG	Olgod	Olgod	--3-----	RL	0212		5549N 00837E	
	DK OYK	Olstykke	Olstykke	--3-----	RL	0607		5547N 01209E	
	DK OTK	Ølstykke	Olstykke	-23-----	RL	0607		5548N 01210E	
	DK OEL	Olstykke Stationsby	Olstykke Stationsby	--3-----	RL	0212		5547N 01209E	
	DK OMO	Omø	Omo	1-------	AI	9812			
	DK OFQ	Orbæk	Orbak	--3-----	RQ	0212			Arhus? Fyn?
	DK ORE	Orehoved, Falster	Orehoved, Falster	1-------	AI	9704			
	DK OHJ	Ornhoj	Ornhoj	--3-----	RL	0212		5612N 00835E	
	DK ORO	Orø	Oro	1-------	AI	9812			
	DK OSX	Osby	Osby	--3-----	RL	0212		5514N 00939E	
	DK OKB	Østbirk	Ostbirk	--3-----	RQ	9501			
	DK OAS	Øster Assels	Oster Assels	--3-----	RL	0607		5642N 00841E	
	DK ODD	Øster Doense	Oster Doense	--3-----	RL	0201		5642N 00950E	
	DK OSD	Øster Snede	Oster Snede	--3-----	RL	9806			Vejle
	DK OTV	Oster Torslev	Oster Torslev	--3-----	RL	0212		5634N 01012E	
	DK OTT	Otterup	Otterup	0-------	RQ	9705			
	DK OTR	Ovtrup	Ovtrup	0-------	RQ	9307			
¦	DK PAO	Padborg	Padborg	-23-----	RL	0701		5449N 00921E	@Fun@Sta@Coo
	DK PAN	Pandrup	Pandrup	--3-----	RL	0006			
	DK RAN	Randers	Randers	123-----	AF	9606			
	DK RNM	Ranum	Ranum	--3-----	RQ	9501			
	DK RIB	Ribe	Ribe	--3-----	RQ	9705			
	DK RIN	Ringe	Ringe	--3-----	RQ	9501			
	DK RKG	Ringkøbing	Ringkobing	-23-----	RL	0207		5605N 00815E	
	DK RNG	Ringsted	Ringsted	-23-----	AF	9606			
	DK RSS	Risskov	Risskov	--3-----	RL	9805			
	DK ROF	Rødby (Fægehavn)	Rodby (Fagehavn)	1-------	AI	9812			
¦	DK ROD	Rødbyhavn	Rodbyhavn	123-----	RL	0701		5440N 01121E	@Fun@Sta@Coo
	DK RDG	Rødding	Rodding	--3-----	RL	0501		5521N 00903E	
	DK RDK	Rødekro	Rodekro	123-----	RL	0601		5504N 00919E	
+	DK RDV	Rødovre	Rodovre	-23-----	RL	0701		5540N 01227E	
	DK RNN	Rønne	Ronne	1--4----	AI	9704			
	DK RRV	Rørvig	Rorvig	1-------	AI	9704			
	DK RKE	Roskilde	Roskilde	1234----	AF	9606			
	DK RSL	Roslev	Roslev	--3-----	RQ	9705			
	DK RKB	Rudkøbing	Rudkobing	1-------	AI	9704			
	DK RVY	Ruds-Vedby	Ruds-Vedby	--3-----	RL	0104		5532N 01121E	
	DK RUG	Rungsted	Rungsted	--3-----	RL	0207		5553N 01231E	
	DK REY	Ry	Ry	-23-----	RL	0607		5605N 00945E	
	DK RYN	Rynkeby	Rynkeby	--3-----	RL	0207		5523N 01036E	
	DK RYM	Ryomgård	Ryomgard	--3-----	RQ	9501			
¦	DK SAE	Sæby	Saby	123-----	RL	0701		5720N 01032E	@Fun@Sta@Coo
	DK SLV	Sælvig Havn	Salvig Havn	1-------	AI	9704			
	DK SAX	Sakskøbing	Sakskobing	1-------	AI	9704			
	DK SAG	Sandager	Sandager	0-------	RL	9307			
¦	DK SVG	Sandvig	Sandvig	1-3-----	RL	0701		5517N 01447E	@Fun@Sta@Coo
	DK SEO	Sejerø	Sejero	1-------	AI	9704			
	DK SEJ	Sejerslev	Sejerslev	--3-----	RQ	9501			
	DK SLB	Silkeborg	Silkeborg	123-----	AF	9606			
	DK CNL	Sindal	Sindal	--3-----	RL	0201		5727N 01012E	
	DK SJO	Sjællands Odde	Sjallands Odde	0-------	RQ	9402			
	DK SSK	Skælskør	Skalskor	1-------	RQ	9704			
	DK SKB	Skærbæk	Skarbak	0-------	AI	9704			
	DK SKE	Skævinge	Skavinge	--3-----	RL	0207		5554N 01208E	
	DK SKA	Skagen	Skagen	12------	AF	9606			
	DK SKL	Skals	Skals	--3-----	RQ	9501			
	DK SKM	Skamby	Skamby	--3-----	RQ	9501			
	DK SKG	Skanderborg	Skanderborg	-23-----	RL	0207		5602N 00950E	
	DK SDO	Skarø/Drejø	Skaro/Drejo	1-------	AI	9812			
	DK SJB	Skejby	Skejby	0-------	RQ	9307			
	DK SKY	Skibby	Skibby	--3-----	RL	9901			
	DK SKV	Skive	Skive	12------	AF	9606			
	DK SKJ	Skjern	Skjern	-23-----	AF	9606			
	DK SKO	Skodborg	Skodborg	--3-----	RQ	9501			
	DK SKT	Skodstrup	Skodstrup	--3-----	RQ	9501			
	DK SKP	Skørping	Skorping	--3-----	RQ	9501			
	DK SKD	Skovlund	Skovlund	--3-----	RQ	9501			
¦	DK SKR	Skrydstrup	Skrydstrup	--34----	RL	0701	SKS	5514N 00915E	@Fun@Sta@Coo
	DK SLG	Slagelse	Slagelse	-23-----	AF	9606			
	DK SLA	Slangerup	Slangerup	--3-----	RQ	9501			
	DK SMO	Smørum	Smorum	0-------	RQ	9307			
	DK SNE	Snekkersten	Snekkersten	1-------	AI	9704			
	DK SBG	Søborg	Soborg	-23-----	RQ	9705			
	DK SOB	Søby Havn	Soby Havn	1-------	AI	9704			
	DK SND	Sønder	Sonder	--3-----	RQ	9705			
	DK SOM	Sønder Omme	Sonder Omme	--3-----	RL	0607		5550N 00854E	
	DK SGD	Sønderborg	Sonderborg	12-4----	AF	9606			
	DK SDS	Søndersø	Sonderso	--3-----	RL	0607		5529N 01016E	
	DK SRO	Sorø	Soro	--3-----	RQ	9705			
	DK SOV	Sorvad	Sorvad	--3-----	RQ	9705			
	DK SPB	Spodsbjerg Havn	Spodsbjerg Havn	1-------	AI	9704			
	DK SPP	Sporup	Sporup	--3-----	RQ	0002			
	DK SPO	Spottrup	Spottrup	--3-----	RL	0212		5556N 01015E	
	DK SVV	Stålvalseværket	Stalvalsevarket	1-------	AI	9704			
	DK STT	Statoil-Havnen	Statoil-Havnen	1-------	AF	9606			
	DK STA	Stavning	Stavning	1--4----	AI	0207		5558N 00823E	
	DK STE	Stege	Stege	1-------	AI	9704			
	DK SRP	Stenderup	Stenderup	--3-----	RQ	9307			
	DK SKI	Stenkilde	Stenkilde	0-------	RQ	9307			
	DK STL	Stenlille	Stenlille	--3-----	RL	0507		5547N 01212E	
	DK SLE	Stenløse	Stenlose	--3-----	RL	0207		5546N 01212E	
	DK SNS	Stenstrup	Stenstrup	--3-----	RQ	9501			
	DK STG	Stignæsværkets Havn	Stignasvarkets Havn	1-------	AI	9704			
	DK STN	Stigsnæs	Stigsnas	1-------	AI	9812			
	DK SMA	Stokkemarke	Stokkemarke	--3-----	RL	0407		5450N 01123E	
	DK STO	Støvring	Stovring	--3-----	RL	0201		5630N 01010E	
	DK STB	Strib Havn	Strib Havn	1-------	AI	9704			
	DK STR	Struer	Struer	12------	AF	9606			
	DK SNO	Strynø	Stryno	1-------	AI	9812			
	DK SBK	Stubbekobing	Stubbekobing	1-------	AI	0212		5453N 01203E	
	DK SSV	Studstrupværkets Havn	Studstrupvarkets Havn	1-------	AI	9704			
	DK SBY	Sundby	Sundby	--3-----	RL	9811			
	DK SNY	Sundby, Mors	Sundby, Mors	1-3-----	RL	0507		5653N 00841E	
	DK SUS	Sunds	Sunds	--3-----	RL	9806			Ringköbing
	DK SUE	Sundsøre	Sundsore	1-------	AI	9812			
¦	DK SVA	Svaneke	Svaneke	1-3-----	RL	0701		5508N 01509E	@Fun@Sta@Coo
+	DK SVB	Svebølle	Svebolle	-23-----	RL	0701		5539N 01117E	
	DK SVE	Svendborg	Svendborg	12------	AF	9606			
	DK SVN	Svenstrup	Svenstrup	--3-----	RL	0207		5658N 00951E	
	DK SNN	Svinninge	Svinninge	--3-----	RQ	9501			
	DK SDA	Sydals	Sydals	1-3--6--	RL	0607		5454N 00953E	
	DK SYD	Sydborg	Sydborg	0-------	RQ	9307			
	DK TBA	Taarbæk	Taarbak	--3-----	RL	9811			
+	DK TPN	Tappernøje	Tappernoje	--3-----	RL	0701		5510N 01159E	
	DK TRM	Tarm	Tarm	--3-----	RQ	9501			
	DK TRS	Tårs	Tars	1-------	AI	9704			
	DK TTR	Tåstrup	Tastrup	--3-----	RQ	9501			
	DK TLV	Taulov	Taulov	--3-----	RQ	0101			
	DK THM	Them	Them	--3-----	RL	9806			Arhus
	DK TED	Thisted	Thisted	12-4----	AF	9606			
	DK TMD	Thorsminde	Thorsminde	1-3-----	RL	0401		5623N 00808E	
	DK THO	Thurø	Thuro	--3-----	RQ	9811			
	DK THY	Thyholm	Thyholm	-23-----	RL	0607		5639N 00831E	
	DK TIL	Tilst	Tilst	--3-----	RL	0401		5612N 01007E	
	DK TGV	Tinglev	Tinglev	--3-----	RQ	9501			
	DK TIS	Tistrup	Tistrup	--3-----	RL	0106		5542N 00836E	
	DK TFT	Toftlund	Toftlund	--3-----	RQ	9705			
	DK TOM	Tommerup	Tommerup	--3-----	RQ	9501			
	DK TON	Tønder	Tonder	0-------	RQ	9311			
	DK TOE	Tørring	Torring	--3-----	RQ	9705			
	DK TRN	Tranebjerg	Tranebjerg	0-------	RQ	9705			
	DK TKA	Tranekaer	Tranekaer	--3-----	RL	0607		5500N 01051E	
	DK TRI	Trige	Trige	--3-----	RL	0607		5615N 01010E	
	DK TUB	Tuborg	Tuborg	12------	AF	9606			
	DK TNO	Tunø	Tuno	1-------	AI	9812			
	DK TUR	Tureby	Tureby	--3-----	RL	0207		5521N 01204E	
	DK TYB	Thyborøn	Thyboron	12------	AF	9606			
+	DK UGE	Ugerløse	Ugerlose	--3-----	RL	0701		5538N 01110E	
	DK ULD	Uldum	Uldum	--3-----	RQ	9705			
	DK ULB	Ulfborg	Ulfborg	--3-----	RQ	9501			
	DK ULL	Ullerslev	Ullerslev	--3-----	RQ	9704			
	DK VAD	Vadum	Vadum	--3-----	RQ	9501			
	DK VLE	Værløse	Varlose	--34----	RL	0207		5516N 01208E	
	DK VAL	Valby	Valby	0-------	RQ	9307			
	DK VAE	Vallensbaek	Vallensbaek	123-----	RL	0601		5538N 01222E	
	DK VDP	Vamdrup	Vamdrup	--3-----	RQ	9501			
	DK VNG	Vang Havn	Vang Havn	1-------	RQ	9704			
	DK VDE	Varde	Varde	--3-----	RQ	9705			
	DK VBK	Vedbæk	Vedbak	--3-----	RL	0212		5551N 01234E	
	DK VJN	Vejen	Vejen	--3-----	RQ	9501			
	DK VEJ	Vejle	Vejle	12------	AF	9606			
	DK VMB	Vemb	Vemb	-23-----	RQ	9705			
	DK VEN	Venø Havn	Veno Havn	1-------	AI	9704			
	DK VBJ	Vestbjerg	Vestbjerg	--3--6--	RL	0507	QXF	5708N 00959E	
	DK VES	Vesterø Havn, Læsø	Vestero Havn, Laso	1-------	AI	9704			
	DK VIB	Viborg	Viborg	-23-----	AF	9606			
	DK VIY	Viby J	Viby J	--3-----	RL	0101			
	DK VBI	Viby/Sjælland	Viby/Sjalland	--3-----	RL	0207		5533N 01201E	
	DK VID	Videbaek	Videbaek	--3-----	RQ	9705			
	DK VIG	Vig	Vig	--3-----	RQ	9705			
	DK VAS	Vigsnæs	Vigsnas	--3-----	RL	9811			
	DK VNR	Vinderup	Vinderup	-23-----	AF	9606			
	DK VPP	Vipperød	Vipperod	--3-----	RQ	9704			
	DK VIR	Virum	Virum	0-------	RQ	9307			
	DK VBG	Vissenbjerg	Vissenbjerg	--3-----	RL	0407		5523N 01008E	
	DK NVM	Vium	Vium	--3-----	RL	0201		5640N 00858E	
	DK VOK	Vodskov	Vodskov	--3-----	RQ	9501			
	DK SKS	Vojens	Vojens	--34----	AI	9506			
	DK VOR	Vordingborg	Vordingborg	12------	AF	9606			
	DK VRA	Vrå	Vra	--3-----	RL	0207		5721N 00956E	

== See also ==
- ISO 3166-2:DK
