= Gjessing =

Gjessing is a Danish and Norwegian surname. Notable people with the surname include:

- Alf Gjessing
- Gustav Antonio Gjessing (1835–1921), Norwegian philologist
- Gutorm Gjessing
- Helge Gjessing
- Just Gjessing
- Ketil Gjessing (born 1934), Norwegian poet
- Kristian Gjessing (born 1978), Danish handball player
- Poul Ib Gjessing
- Søren Christian Gjessing
