= Listed buildings in Aalborg Municipality =

This is a list of listed buildings in Aalborg Municipality, Denmark.

== The list ==
=== 9000 Aalborg ===
Listing name	Image	Location	Coordinates	Description
Jørgen Olufsen's House		Østerågade 25, 9000 Aalborg		
Brigadér Hallings Gård		Vesterbro 77, 9000 Aalborg		
Brix House		Adelgade 4, 9000 Aalborg		
Distriktstoldkammeret		Toldbod Plads 1, 9000 Aalborg		Three-winged building with outhouses in the courtyard from 1900 to 1902 by Hack Kampmann.
Fjordgade 2		Fjordgade 2, 9000 Aalborg		
Gammeltorv 10		Gammeltorv 10, 9000 Aalborg		
Gaarden		Hasserisvej 168, 9000 Aalborg		
Gaarden		Hasserisvej 168, 9000 Aalborg		
Hamborggården		Maren Turis Gade 6, 9000 Aalborg		
Hamborggården		Maren Turis Gade 6, 9000 Aalborg		
Jens Bang's House		Østerågade 9, 9000 Aalborg		
Kirkegårdsgade 3		Kirkegårdsgade 3, 9000 Aalborg		
KUNSTEN Museum of Modern Art		Østerågade 25, 9000 Aalborg		
Nørregade 1		Nørregade 1, 9000 Aalborg		
Nørregade 9		Nørregade 9, 9000 Aalborg		
Pakhuse i Kattesundet og Borgergade		Kattesundet 20, 9000 Aalborg		
Ryesgade Skole		Ryesgade 52, 9000 Aalborg		
Ryesgade Skole		Ryesgade 54, 9000 Aalborg		
Ryesgade Skole		Ryesgade 55, 9000 Aalborg		
Ryesgade Skole		Ryesgade 58, 9000 Aalborg		
Ryesgade Skole		Ryesgade 60, 9000 Aalborg		
Ting- og Arresthuset		Kong Hans Gade 18, 9000 Aalborg		
Tinghuset		Gammeltorv 4, 9000 Aalborg		
Old Town Hall		Gammeltorv 2, 9000 Aalborg		
Hospital of the Holy Ghost		Adelgade 14, 9000 Aalborg		
Hospital of the Holy Ghost		Klosterjordet 3, 9000 Aalborg		
Hospital of the Holy Ghost		Klosterjordet 5, 9000 Aalborg		
Hospital of the Holy Ghost		Klosterjordet 7, 9000 Aalborg		
Aalborg Post and Telegraph Building		Algade 44, 9000 Aalborg		
Aalborg Castle		Slotspladsen 1, 9000 Aalborg		
Aalborg Castle		Slotspladsen 1, 9000 Aalborg		
Aalborg station		John F. Kennedys Plads 3, 9000 Aalborg		

=== 900 Aalborg SV ===
Listing name	Image	Location	Coordinates	Description
Riihimäkivej 3		Riihimækivej 3, 9200 Aalborg SV		

=== 9230 Svenstrup J ===
Listing name	Image	Location	Coordinates	Description
Godthåb Hammerværk		Zincksvej 1A, 9230 Svenstrup J		
Godthåb Hammerværk		Zincksvej 1A, 9230 Svenstrup J		
Godthåb Hammerværk		Zincksvej 1A, 9230 Svenstrup J		

=== 9240 Nibe ===
Listing name	Image	Location	Coordinates	Description
Lundbæk		Halkærvej 3, 9240 Nibe		
Mellemgade 52		Mellemgade 52, 9240 Nibe		
Store Restrup		Restrup Kærvej 10, 9240 Nibe		
Vår		Vår Skovvej 6, 9240 Nibe		
Vår		Vår Skovvej 6, 9240 Nibe		
Vår		Vår Skovvej 6, 9240 Nibe		

=== 9260 Gistrup ===
Listing name	Image	Location	Coordinates	Description
Postgård		Postgårdsvej 11, 9260 Gistrup		

=== 9270 Klarup ===
Listing name	Image	Location	Coordinates	Description
Klarupgård		Egensevej 155, 9270 Klarup		Church

=== 9280 Storvorde ===
Listing name	Image	Location	Coordinates	Description
Gudumlund		Møllebrovej 2, 9280 Storvorde		
Gudumlund		Møllebrovej 2, 9280 Storvorde		
Gudumlund		Møllebrovej 2, 9280 Storvorde		

=== 9293 Kongerslev ===
Listing name	Image	Location	Coordinates	Description
Kongstedlund		Kongstedlundvej 18, 9293 Kongerslev		
Regsnæs		Refsnæsvej 3, 9293 Kongerslev		
Regsnæs		Refsnæsvej 3, 9293 Kongerslev		

=== 9370 Hals ===
Listing name	Image	Location	Coordinates	Description
Hals Skanse		Skansen 1, 9370 Hals		
Hals Skanse		Skansen 1, 9370 Hals		

=== 9400 Nørresundby ===
Listing name	Image	Location	Coordinates	Description
Bjørum		Hvorupgårdvej 82, 9400 Nørresundby		
Bryggergården		Gammel Østergade 8, 9400 Nørresundby		
Vang		Bakmøllevej 241, 9400 Nørresundby		
