= MF Mary =

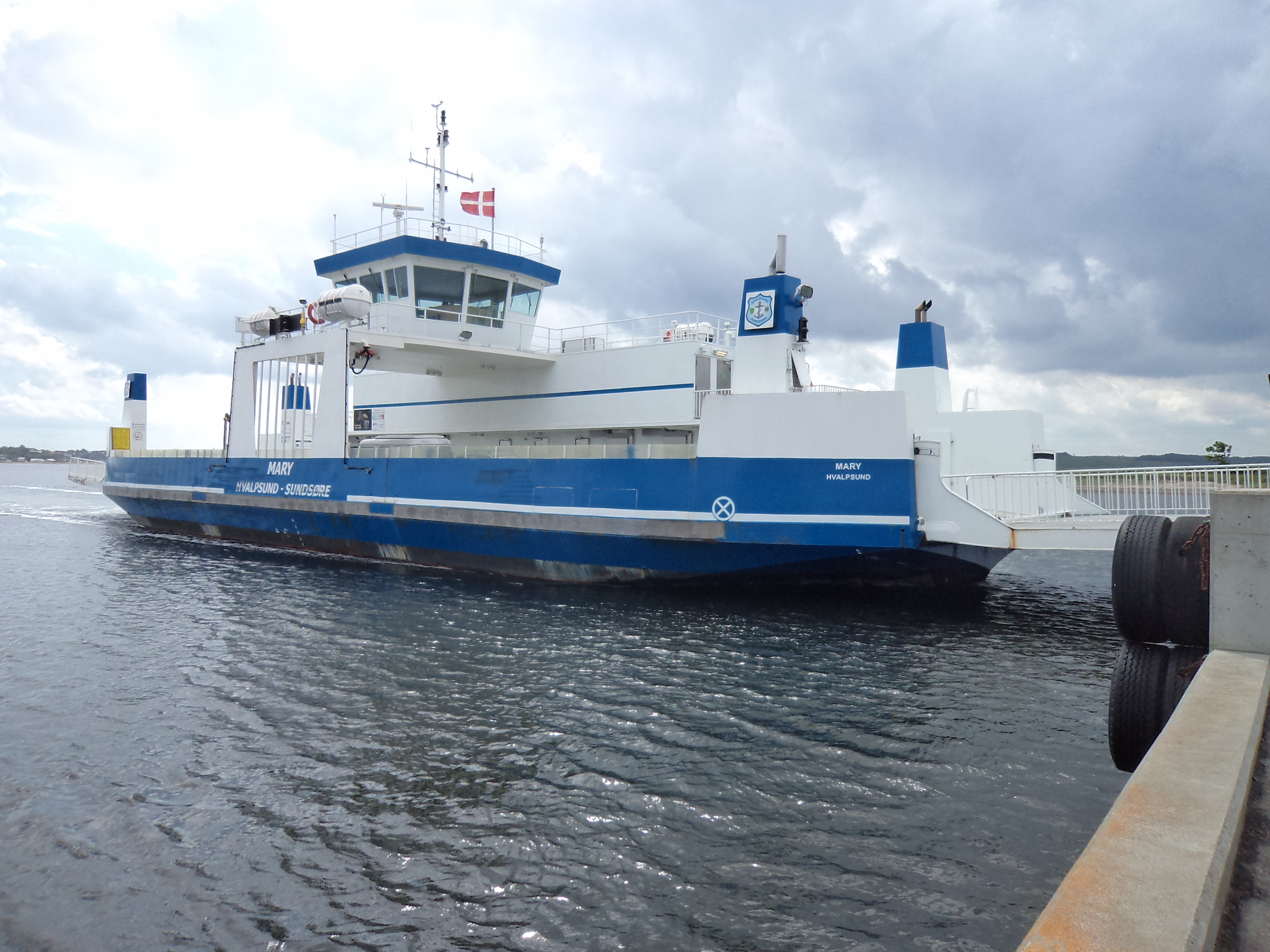
- MF Mary

History

Denmark
- Name: Mary
- Owner: Hvalpsund-Sundsøre Førgeri I/S
- Route: Hvalpsund-Sundsøre
- Builder: Aasens skibsværft A/S
- Launched: March 2006
- Completed: 2006
- Identification: IMO number: 9363352

General characteristics
- Tonnage: 474 GT
- Length: 42 m (137 ft 10 in)
- Beam: 13 m (42 ft 8 in)
- Draft: 3.65 m (12 ft 0 in)
- Speed: 8 knots (15 km/h; 9.2 mph)

MF Mary is a Danish ferry sailing on the crossing over Hvalpsund between Hvalpsund-Sundsøre. It was built in 2006. The ferry can include up to 147 passengers and 30 passenger cars. The new ferry Mary, of the Sleipner-Fur type, was put into operation in March 2006. Motor and ferry service started in 1927 with the ferry MF Hvalpsund, this was the only rail ferry owned by a private railway company, which sailed to 1980. In 1980 a new ferry was introduced on the route, Hvalpsund 2, which had previously sailed for the Motorfolk's ferry crossing Sallingsund, between Pinen, Salling and Plagen, Mors.
