= Peder Laale =

Peder Laale or Peder Lolle was a 14th-century Danish scholar, known for his collection of proverbs Petri Laale Parabulæ, which was first published in 1506. Not much is known about his identity, but textual clues suggest that he may have been a magistrate or judge, or perhaps a priest. He may be identical with the deacon of Odense by name of Peder Nielsen Låle (in Latin Petrus Nicolai alias dictus Lalo) who traveled as a messenger from the Papal nuntius in Denmark and Sweden to the Curia in Avignon in the 1330s, and who later took up a post at the bishopric in Ribe. The theory that Deacon Peder Nielsen Låle is also the author of the proverbs is supported by traits suggestive of French influence in the proverbs, as well as the dates from which they are known. The earliest fragments known are from 1450 suggesting that they must have been well known for a period before that, placing their author's likely life time in the 14th century. The proverbs are considered a treasure of medieval Danish literature.

In 1506 professors at the University of Copenhagen published the full collection Peder Laale's Parabolae in print for the first time.

The almost 1,200 proverbs in the Peder Laale collection are assumed to have been used in the teaching of Latin, and each proverb is given in Latin and Medieval Danish. The proverbs come from various sources both from medieval sources in Latin and other European languages, from the preface to the Codex Holmiensis as well as from the oral tradition of the time.

Malum malo dari quam fauce tenace vorari
Bædræ ær æbleth giffweth æn ædhet
"An apple is better when given than when eaten"

Mas fore laudatur qui quod maris est operatur
Then ær man ther gør mandz gærningh
"He is a man who does man's work"

== See also ==
- Peder Syv
