= OKB (disambiguation) =

OKB is a transliteration of "ОКБ" the Russian initials of "опытно-конструкторское бюро" (Russian: Opytno-Konstruktorskoye Byuro, lit. 'Experimental Design Bureau').

OKB may also refer to:

- Okobo language (ISO 639-3 language code okb), a language found in Nigeria
- Oceanside Municipal Airport (FAA LID airport code OKB), Oceanside, California, USA; also called the Bob Maxwell Memorial Field
- Orchid Beach Airport (IATA airport code OKB), Fraser Island, Queensland, Australia; see List of airports in Australia
- Ostbirk (Danish: Østbirk; UN LOCODE geocode OKB), Horsens Municipality, Central Denmark Region, Denmark; see UN/LOCODE:DK
- East Coast Line (Sweden) (OKB; Swedish: Ostkustbanan), a 402-kilometre (250 mi) long mainline railway in Sweden
