= Snow (2019 video game) =

- Developer: Poppermost Productions
- Publishers: Poppermost Productions (PC); Sony Interactive Entertainment (PS4)
- Engine: CryEngine
- Platforms: Microsoft Windows, PlayStation 4
- Release: February 14, 2019
- Genre: Sports
- Modes: Single-player, multiplayer

Snow was a free-to-play winter sports video game developed by Poppermost Productions and was released for Microsoft Windows, and PlayStation 4. The 0.9 Beta was released on December 13, 2016.

== Gameplay ==
Snow was an open world skiing and snowboarding game that allowed players to explore mountainous environments consisting of a range of different routes and discoverable items. This environment could be edited by players, with features such as jumps and rails able to be added dynamically anywhere throughout the area.

Characters could be customized by means of catalogues of popular winter sports clothing brands for players looking for a more sophisticated look. Players could compete individually or against their friends in various sporting events and competitions. Different spawn points on the maps could be chosen, allowing for different skiing and snowboarding styles.

== Development ==
The game was developed by Swedish video game developer Poppermost Productions. At the time the studio consisted of a small three person team, which would eventually grow as the project developed. Most of the designers were avid fan of Skiing or Snowboarding. During this time period extreme sports were no longer a popular video game genre, and the team set out to make a new one. However the team also found that previous games in the genre failed to "truly captured the identity of the sports". In particular Poppermost's CEO had noted that previous games usually focused on a small number of athletes or sponsors, forced the players down a predetermined campaign as well as lacking "authenticity"

The game was primarily centered around the fictional Sialia Mountain. The team opted to not base the setting on a real life mountain due to a desire to "ensure that every face was hand crafted towards gameplay" while also avoiding having to make compromises. This also allowed the team to include elements which would not normally appear on such a mountain.

From the start the team opted to release the game via a Games-as-a service model, by which they would continually provide updated content. The team thus opted to make the game free to play in order to "remain relevant". Part of the reason the developer decided to release the game on the PS4 as opposed to the Xbox One was that Sony had a dedicated "free to play" development team.

The sound used in Snow was recorded in Kläppen, Norway used microphones on rails and skis worn by a professional skier.

The game was released on Steam as an Early Access game on the October 10, 2013. An open beta for PlayStation 4 was released on October 26, 2016. Despite its Free-to-Play nature, Poppermost Productions chose to initially sell both versions of the game during these betas in order to "limit the userbase."

Snow used the game backend service LootLocker to manage its microtransactions and in-game content.

In February 2019, Snow left Early Access with the release of Version 1.0. The game also was published by Crytek and co-developed by Wasted Studios.

The game is no longer playable as the multiplayer servers have been taken offline.
