= Thomas S. Hermansen =

Danish photographer and cinematographer

Thomas S. Hermansen (1867 – 1930) was an early filmmaker and film company founder from Denmark. He also developed processes for the making of explosives. He was one of the largest landowners in Aarhus, Denmark and also spent time in the U.S. He was also a photographer.

He came from Låsby, Denmark and was the son of Boelsmand Søren Peder Hermansen and Bodil Marie Thomasen. After a trip to America he returned to Denmark in 1895 and worked as a photographer in Aarhus.

In 1902 returned to America and travelled to California where he met his wife Marie and worked in photography before becoming involved with early Holywood filmmaking. After a brief period as a partially successful gold digger, he turned to enlarging and selling photographs making a good living. In 1904 he started making live pictures, and in 1906 obtained his own cinema. He liked to experiment with the new medium of film trying new ideas such as when in 1904 he mounted a camera on the front of a tram in Aarhus and created a film driving through the city.

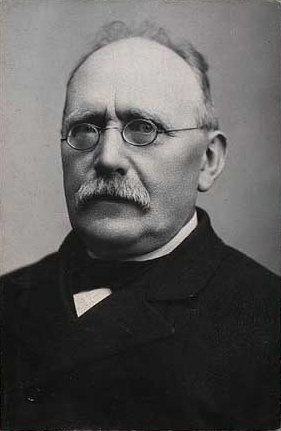
Photo of Harald Jensen by Hermansen

He found it more profitable to show films than make them, so in 1910 he formed a film company called Fotorama that showed his own films as well as films rented from abroad. In 1910 he produced The White Slave Trade. Most of his work was as a cinematographer.

In 1915 during World War I he sailed to America and declared that "Germany cannot win, and we pity her..." and stated that Denmark was supplying Germany with all the food they could import.

Aarhus offers smartphone tours of the city including information on Hermansen and his film factory.
