= Venø =

Island in Denmark

Coordinates: 56°33′15″N 8°37′30″E

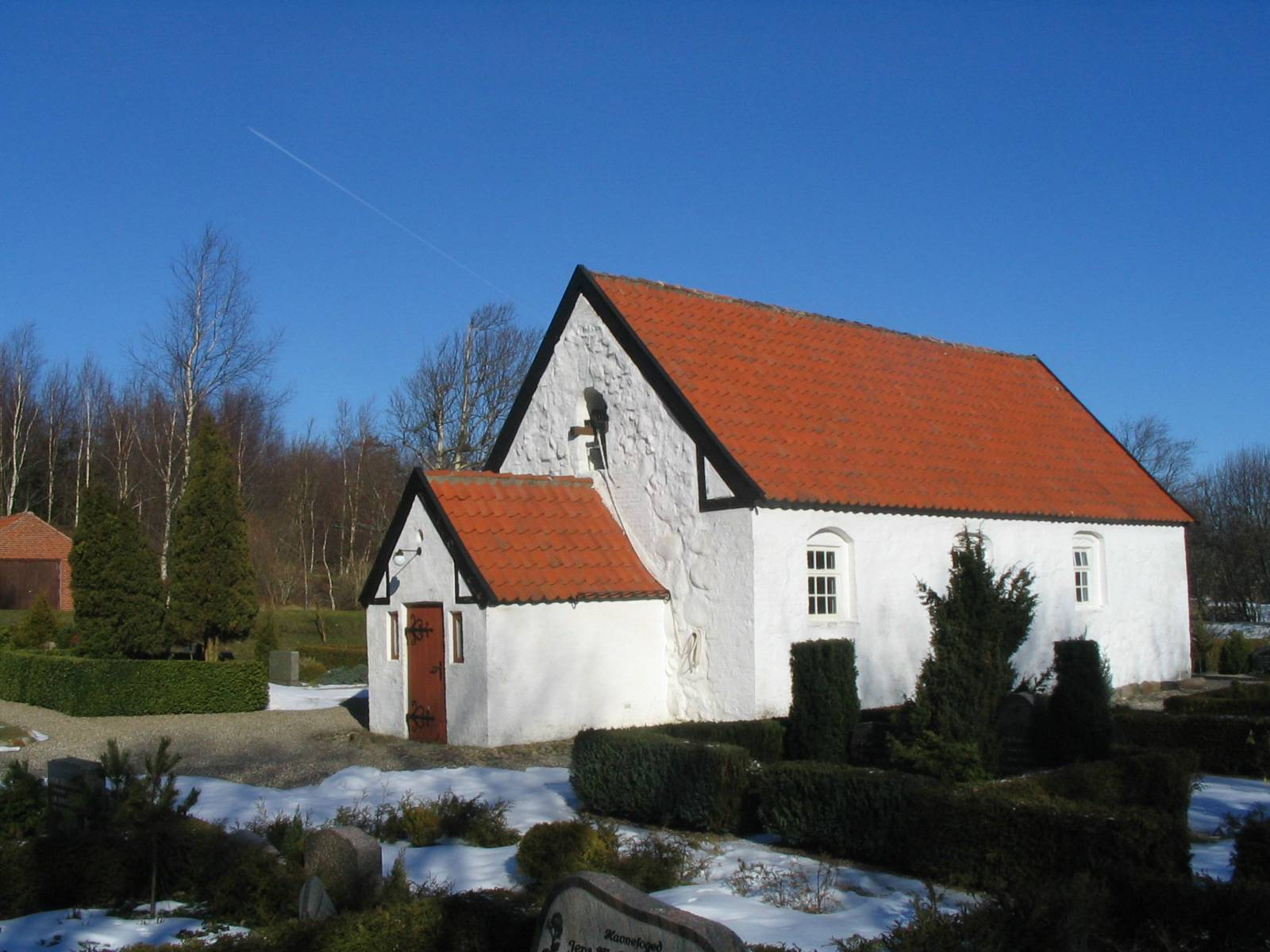
- Venø Church

- Location within Denmark

Geography
- Location: Limfjord
- Area: 6.5 km^{2} (2.5 sq mi)
- Highest elevation: 27 m (89 ft)
- Highest point: Forstov Bakke

Administration
- Denmark
- Region: North Jutland Region
- Municipality: Struer Municipality

Demographics
- Population: 165 (2025)
- Pop. density: 25.38/km^{2} (65.73/sq mi)

Venø is a small Danish island located in Limfjorden in the north of Jutland, 3 kilometres (2 miles) north of Struer. It is 7.5 kilometres (4.7 miles) long and has a maximum width of 1.5 kilometres (0.9 miles). With an area of 6.5 square kilometres (2.5 square miles), it has a population of 165 as of 1 January 2025. Since 1958, there has been a ferry service from Venø Odde, the island's most southerly point, over the narrow sound to Kleppen. Venø's highest point, Forstov Bakke, is 27 metres (89 feet) above sea level and has cliffs to the west. The island is a popular holiday destination with good beaches and camping facilities. The only village, Venø By, in the centre of the island has Denmark's smallest church as well as a small fishing harbour which is suitable for pleasure boats.

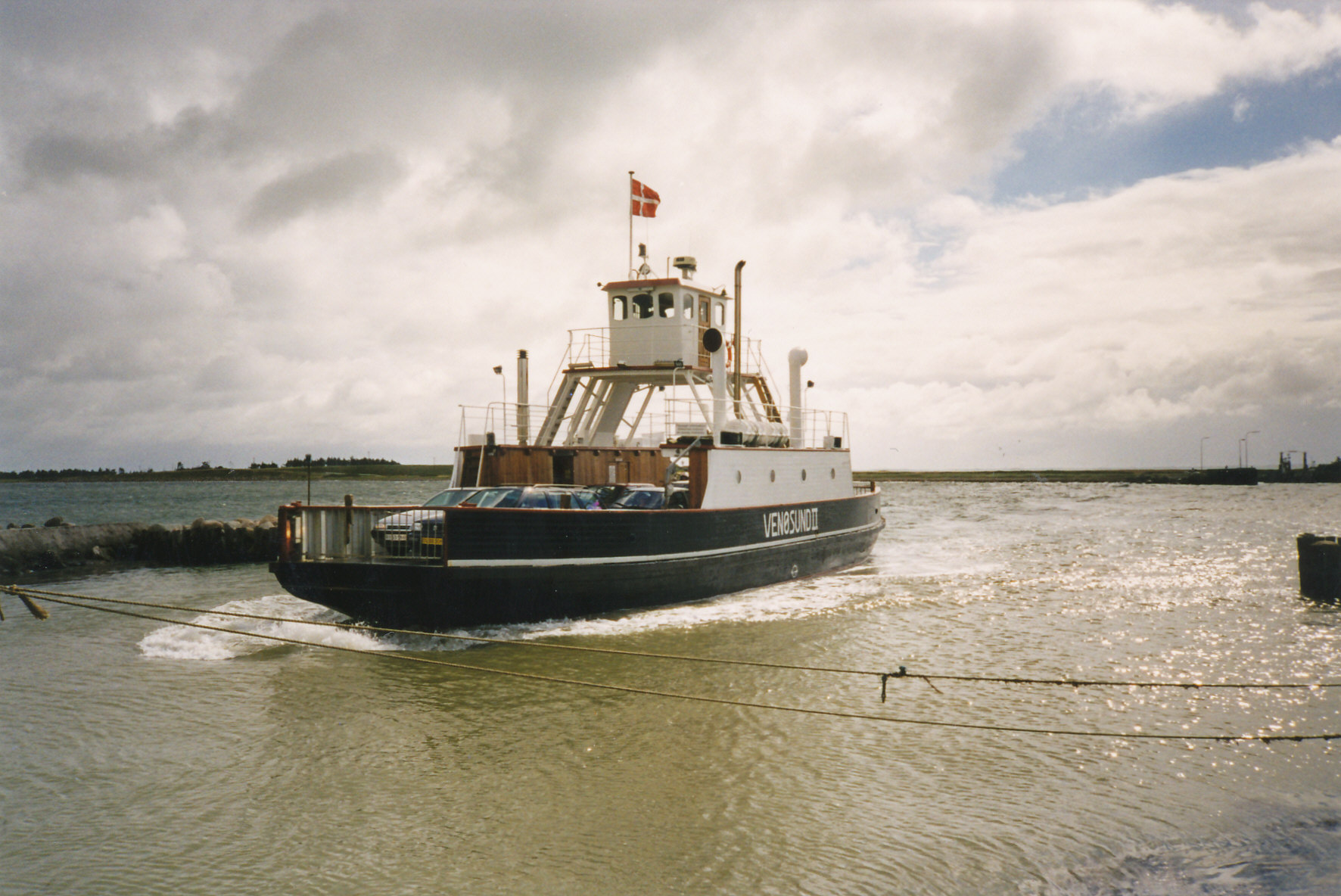
The ferry to Venø

== Venø Church ==
The church is difficult to date but it was probably built around the time of the Reformation (1536), making it the oldest building on the island. According to tradition, it is the smallest church in Denmark measuring only 9.8 by 4.2 metres (32 by 14 feet). The low ceiling and the limited seating capacity (only about 50 places) reinforce this impression. The church is built of fieldstone while brick has been used for the corners and later extensions. There is no tower as the church bell is inside the gable at the west end of the church.

== Venø today ==
Most of the island's inhabitants work on the mainland but some still farm the land or are fishermen. The island has an exciting network of paths allowing for interesting walks with views over the Limfjord. Many varieties of land and sea birds frequent the island but the nature reserve around Nørskovvig is closed during the breeding season from 1 April to 15 July. The village inn, Venø Kro, has a cosy atmosphere while the island's summerhouses and camping sites offer accommodation. The sandy beaches around the island are suitable for children.

== See also ==
- Limfjord
- List of islands of Denmark
