= Frederik Winkel Horn =

Danish historian and literary scholar

Frederik Winkel Horn (19 July 1845 – 17 November 1898), was a Danish historian and translator, originally an archaeologist. He translated from numerous languages including Icelandic, Greek, and Latin. He was the first person to translate the novel Romola by George Eliot into Danish.

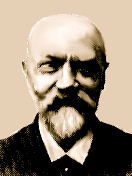
Frederik Winkel Horn, was a historian and archaeologist.

== Works ==
- Mennesket i forhistorisk tid, 1874 (culture in the old norse time)
- Nordiske heltesagaer, 1876 (Norse saga)
- Peder Syv, 1878 (study of Peder Syv) PhD dissertation
- Den danske litteraturs historie, 2 vol., 1881 (Danish literature history)
- Dansk Læsebog for skolernes mellemste og højere klasser, 1883 (Co-authored with Otto Borchsenius)
- Grundtvigs liv og gerning, 1883 (biography of N. F. S. Grundtvig)
- Jomsvikingerne, 1895 (Saga history of Scandinavia)

=== Translations (to Danish) ===
- Den ældre Edda, 1869 (The poetic Edda)
- Billeder af livet paa Island, 3 vol., 1871-1876 (the Iceland sagas)
- E. Bellamy, Anno 2000-1889, 1889 (Novel)
- Saxo Grammaticus, Danmarks historie, 1896-1898 (Gesta Danorum)
- Ludvig Holbergs levnedsbreve, 1897 (about Ludvig Holberg)
- Michael Kohlhas og andre Fortaellinger, 1897 (about Michael Kohlhaas)
