= Helge Gjessing =

Norwegian archaeologist (1886–1924)

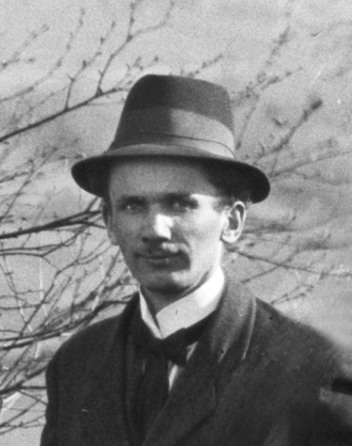
Helge Gjessing Portrait

Helge Johan Gjessing (23 April 1886 – 4 July 1924) was a Norwegian archaeologist.

== Biography ==
He was born in Arendal in Agder County, Norway. He was a son of philologist Gustav Antonio Gjessing and his wife Helga Monrad. He was a grandson of university professor Marcus Jacob Monrad (1816-1897), a first cousin of Harald Gjessing, and through his brother, the vicar Marcus Jacob Gjessing, he was an uncle of archaeologist Gutorm Gjessing.

He enrolled as a student of history and archaeology in 1904, and graduated with the cand.philol. degree in 1912. He was hired as curator at Stavanger Museum in 1913, and was promoted to director in 1914. He worked as subdirector at the Royal Frederick University (now University of Oslo) from 1917. In 1920 he took the dr.philos. degree with the thesis Rogalands stenalder, about the Stone Age in Rogaland. He died at a sanatorium in Gausdal in July 1924.

== Personal life ==
In 1913 he married Thale Sandvig from Lillehammer (1890–1918), a daughter of professor Anders Sandvig.

== Selected works ==
- Rogalands stenalder (1920).
