= Easy Taxi =

Taxi hailing mobile app

- Industry: Vehicle for hire
- Founded: Rio de Janeiro, Brazil (June 24, 2011)
- Founders: Tallis Gomes; Daniel Cohen; Vinicius Gracia; Marcio William
- Successor: Cabify
- Headquarters: São Paulo, Brazil
- Parent: Maxi Mobility
- Website: easytaxi.com

Easy Taxi was a mobile app for taxi hailing that was available in 30 countries, and is now part of Cabify, from Maxi Mobility group. The app allowed users to book a taxi and track it in real time. The same iOS, Android, or Windows Phone app was used in all places in which the partner taxis operate. Easy Taxi was founded in 2011 in Brazil and expanded globally, covering the network of 30 countries and more than 420 cities. At December 2014, the company reported it reached the number of 17 million users and more than 400,000 taxi drivers were affiliated with the Easy Taxi network.

The startup was backed primarily by the biggest e-Commerce incubator in the world, Rocket Internet, but also other investors, including Millicom and iMENA secure Easy Taxi's foothold in emerging markets. The four latest series of investment took Easy Taxi to over $77 million in backing.

== History ==
The original idea emerged in early 2011 from the founders, Tallis Gomes and Daniel Cohen. According to Gomes, the main trigger for starting the company was inefficiency of the taxi transportation he experienced in Rio de Janeiro during one of the startup events:

I was attending an event for start-ups in Leblon and I was waiting for a taxi for about half an hour on a rainy night. At that time I was planning to create a bus monitoring application, but I changed my mind and decided to invest in this solution.

The concept was first presented to the public during the Startup Weekend RIO 2011. After winning the entire competition, in the same year the company won Startup Farm Rio contest and entered the group of five finalists selected from scores of entrants in the IBM-backed SmartCamp competition. Together with other finalists, Easy Taxi was invited to the high-tech conference in Rio, which brought together business leaders and government officials interested in solving urban problems.

The application was launched in beta version in August 2011, following two-month-long introductory phase. Daniel Cohen, Vinicius Gracia, Bernardo Bicalho, and Marcio William joined Gomes at company's early stages, forming its first team. Rio de Janeiro served as a test market for Easy Taxi, with an official launch of the app in April 2012. The initial business model was based on charging the driver R$2 per each completed ride. Within the first year of operations, the company managed to acquire more than 5000 drivers and 200,000 users. Upon entering São Paulo, Alex Tabor, an angel investor from Peixe Urbano, supported the company with first major funding. The real turning point came with the first round of investment of $4.9 million from Rocket Internet in October 2012. The fresh inflow of funds allowed Easy Taxi to expand abroad to its first international market, Mexico. On 24 June 2013, Easy Taxi received Series B investment from Latin America Internet Holding (LIH) a joint venture between Rocket Internet and Millicom, securing another $15 million. At that time the company stated it had more than 1 million downloads and 30000 drivers in the network. The new funds were intended for international expansion in Asia and LATAM, improved customer service and new features. Following the capital injection, the company entered several new markets, including Malaysia (July 2013), Philippines and Thailand (August 2013), and Hong Kong.

Another $10 million round of funding and a plan to tackle a new market – Africa, were announced in July 2013. The joint venture responsible for the investment was Africa Internet Group, backed by Rocket Internet and its 35% owner, telecoms operator Millicom.

In October 2013, Rocket Internet and iMENA Holding partnered together, launching the app in the Middle East and North Africa. The investment amounted to $7 million and was intended for the app's regional rollout, which started in Saudi Arabia. On launching in Nigeria in July 2013, Easy Taxi has secured close to 30,000 user app downloads in just over five months in existence. Th

In 2017 Cabify bought Easy Taxi. The app itself was incorporated into Cabify in 2019 and Easy Taxi was discontinued.

== Awards ==
The company won multiple awards as a pioneer in taxi call service in Latin America. This includes Startup Weekend RIO 2011, IBM SmartCamp Brazil 2011, Startup Farm RIO 2011 and TNW Brazil Awards. It was featured as Best App of 2014 in App Store and Google Play.

== Social responsibility ==
Easy Taxi is supporting the social responsibility programs for the taxi industry worldwide. In Brazil it implemented a system of the so-called “Bibliotaxis”, through which passengers can borrow books available inside Easy Taxi cabs, returning them on the next trip. In other Latin American countries it partnered with local bars and restaurants to promote the “Don’t drink and drive campaign.” In the Philippines, in turn, the company implemented a series of education and physical training for the drivers, aiming at improving the image of the transportation industry in Manila and portray it as safe and efficient.

== Competitors ==
There are several similar services including UnTaxi, Nekso, Auto Amigo., and Uber.
