= Gustav Antonio Gjessing =

Norwegian philologist (1835–1921)

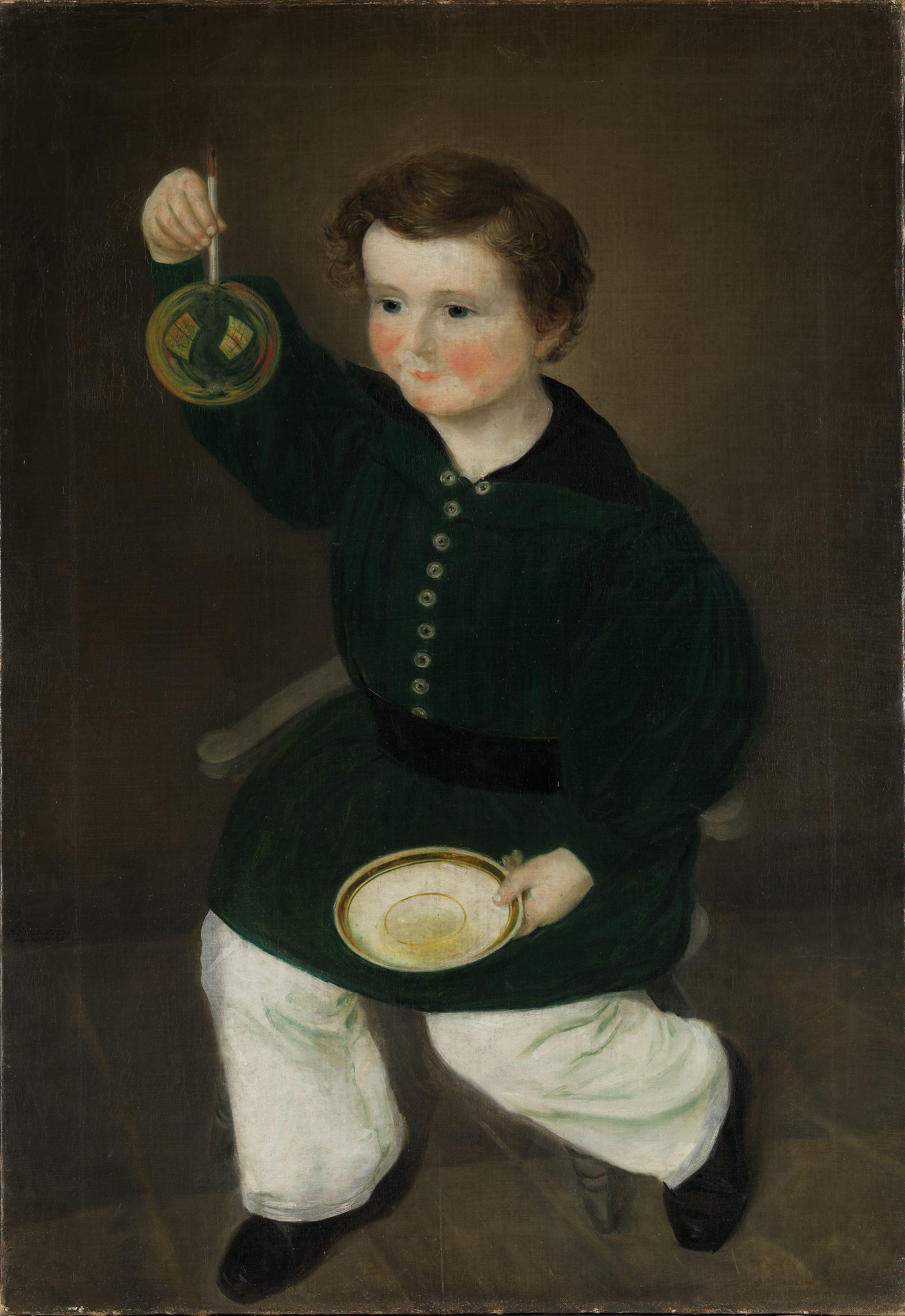
- Born: 22 September 1835; Drammen
- Died: 3 December 1921 (aged 86)
- Occupation: Philologist, writer, teacher
- Children: 2, including Helge Gjessing

Gustav Antonio Gjessing (22 September 1835 – 3 December 1921) was a Norwegian philologist.

He was born in Drammen as a son of Christian Gjessing and Anne Thrane Stoltenberg. In July 1865 in Kristiania he married Helga Margrethe Elisabeth Monrad (1845–1920), a daughter of the famous philosopher Marcus Jacob Monrad. He was the father of archeologist Helge Gjessing, an uncle of ophthalmologist Harald Gjessing and grandfather of archaeologist Gutorm Gjessing.

He enrolled as a student in 1854, and graduated with the cand.philol. degree in 1861. He worked as a school teacher from 1862, from 1865 at Kristiansand Cathedral School. He then worked at a school in Arendal from 1880 to his 1904 retirement. His specialty was the Old Norse language, and he published a number of academic works during his teacher career. His main work was Undersøgelse af Kongesagaens Fremvæxt, published in two volumes in 1873 and 1876. In 1899 he published a translation of the Poetic Edda. He was also a member of Arendal city council from 1897 to 1900, and was a chairman of the local library and museum. After retiring he moved to Lysaker with his wife, where he died in December 1921.
