= Peder Syv =

Danish philologist, folklorist and priest

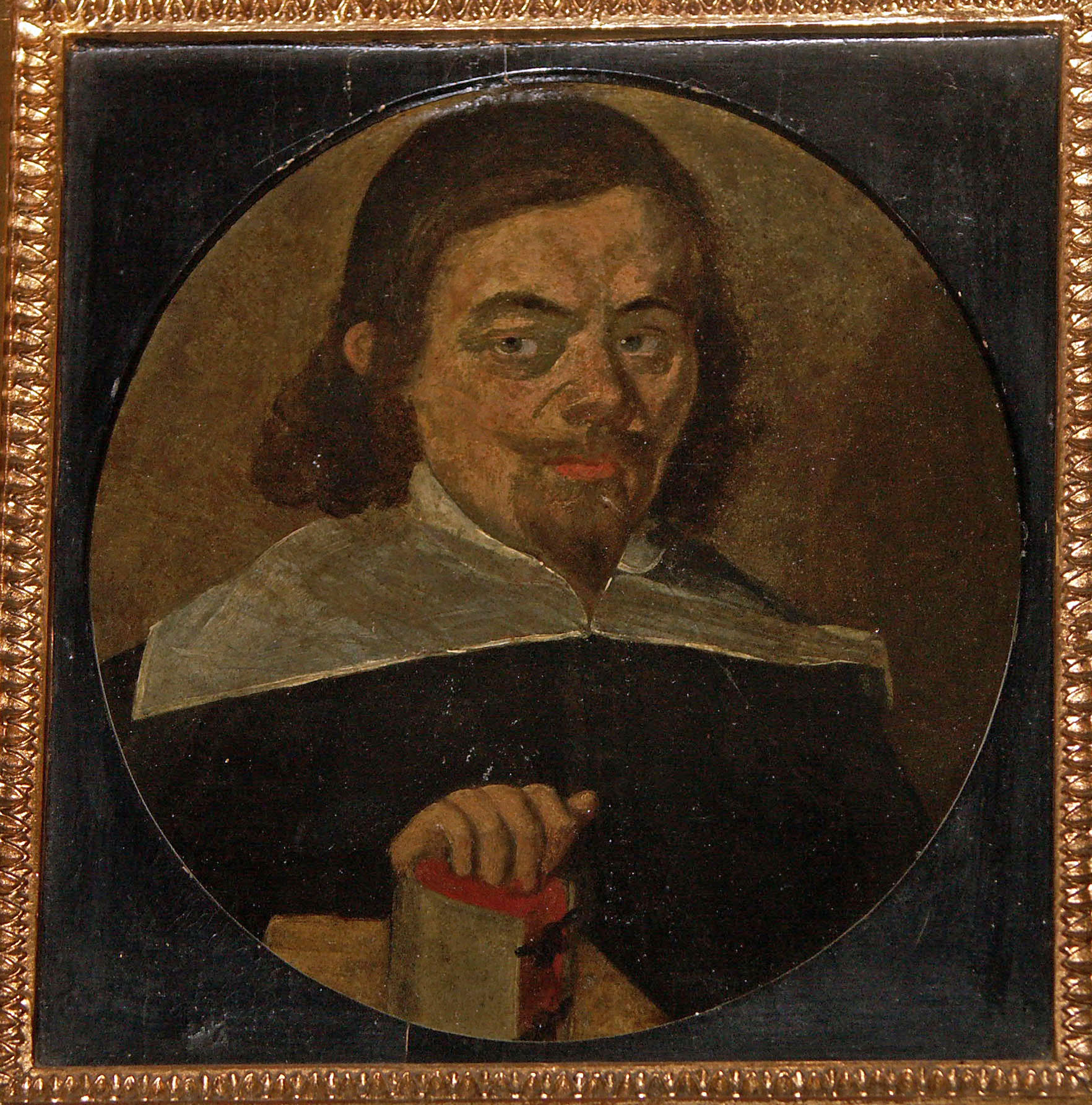
Painting in Hellested Kirke assumed to depict Peder Syv

Peder Pedersen Syv (also spelled Siuf) or in Latin Petrus Petri Septimius (22 February 1631 – 17 February 1702) was a Danish philologist, folklorist, and Lutheran priest, best known for his collections of Danish proverbs and folk songs and his contributions to the development of Danish as a written language.

== Early life and education ==
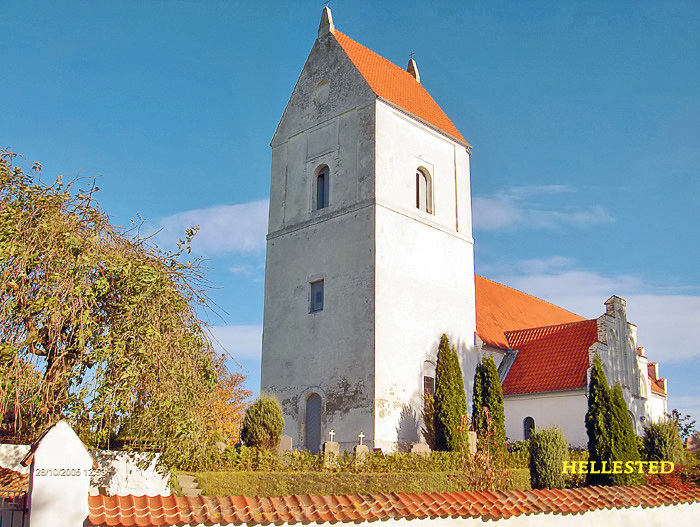
Hellested Kirke, where Syv served as the parish priest from 1664 until his death in 1702

Syv's father was a tenant farmer in the village of Syv (today called Kirke Syv) near Roskilde—likely named Peder Olufsen—and his mother was named Anna Mortensdatter. The family was fairly well off for their social class, and several of Peder's siblings were able to take up professions. One of his brothers seems to have been an uneasy soul, and died on a trip to the Danish East Indian colonies in 1674.

In 1648, Syv entered the Latin school at Roskilde, where he lived at the cloister, holding the office of deputator, an advanced student charged with overseeing the youths. He graduated in 1653 along with his friend Laurids Olufsen Kok, who became one of his allies in the promotion of Danish language. He studied briefly at the University of Copenhagen, until it temporarily closed in 1654 due to a plague outbreak in Copenhagen. Syv had already received his bachelor's degree and went on to teach Latin at the Metropolitan school in Copenhagen.

In 1658, he became rector at Næstved. He seems to have enjoyed teaching music there as is attested in a letter to musicologist Hans Mikkelsen Ravn, thanking him for ten copies of his work Heptachordum Danicum. Næstved was then also home to noble woman Anna Gøye, who owned one of Denmark's largest libraries, to which she gave Peder Syv access. He was also sought out as a baptismal godfather for many locals.

== Ecclesiastic career ==
In 1664, he became parish priest in Hellested in southern Zealand. In order to qualify to take over the farm that came with the office, he married the widow of the former priest, Karen Andersdatter Hoff. She had one son, Hans Hansen Hellested, whom Syv adopted as his own. Together they had three daughters: Ide, Vibeke, and Anna Kirstine, the last of whom married her father's successor as priest in Hellested, Rudolf Moth Bagger. In 1699, Syv became a widower and noted in his journal "[today] died my most dear and virtuous wife Karen Andersdatter Hoff".

Syv remained at Hellested until his death in 1702. At Hellested he prospered, buying extra land for the church farm and taking good care of his daughters. During this time, he corresponded with scholars and priests in Denmark, Iceland, and Sweden about learned topics such as runology, philology, and folklore. He once entertained as a visitor the scientist Ole Rømer and wrote in a letter that, "I learned much by his profession and can die so much the wiser." In 1683, he was appointed "Philologus regius linguæ Danicæ" (Royal philologist of the Danish language). He was also known as an avid collector of books, and the catalogue of his belongings auctioned at his death shows several hundred scholarly works. Syv's biographer Frederik Winkel Horn suggests that he was so dedicated to his scholarship that he must have been a distant and detached priest for his parishioners. One documented case in which he undertook the responsibility of his office was when local residents suspected a woman of being possessed by a demon, and accused her neighbor of practicing witchcraft. Syv maintained that the woman suffered from epilepsy and should be treated only medically.

Syv retained his good health into old age. A week before his death he gave a sermon, performed a wedding and a baptism, and entertained dinner guests. A stomach ache afflicted him for the next four days, culminating in his death on the night of Friday 17 February. An old friend of his, priest, poet, runologist, and folksong collector Jørgen Sorterup recited a memorial poem in rhyme at his funeral.

== Published work ==
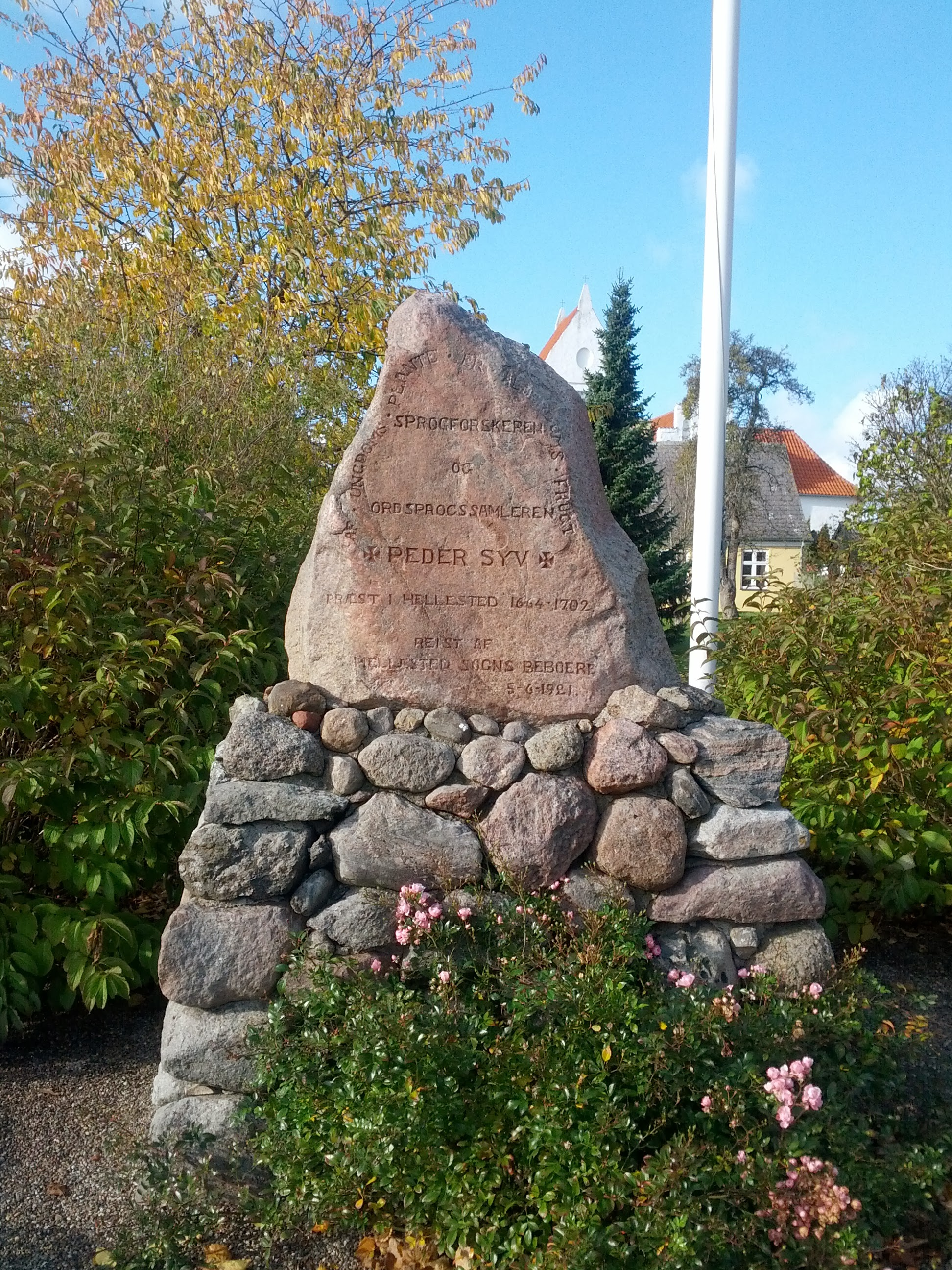
Memorial stone for Peder Syv at Hellested, placed by the people of Hellested in 1921. Its caption says "The plant of youth is the fruit of old age. Philologist and proverb collector Peder Syv, priest in Hellested 1664–1702."

In Peder Syv's era, Danish was primarily a spoken language with little prestige. Latin and German were the languages used in writing and in most official functions. Syv was one of a small group of scholars who worked to introduce Danish in a wider spectrum of social domains and to establish literature. They based their work on similar efforts undertaken in Germany, where scholars had organized themselves into language academies to promote the use of German in writing.

In 1663, Syv published the philological treatise Nogle Betenkninger om det Cimbriske Sprog ("Some Thoughts about the Cimbrian Language"). The treatise was a programmatic defense of vernacular national languages as vehicles of literature. He argued that just as Dante Alighieri and Martin Opitz had contributed to making their local vernacular languages respectable languages for written literature, so this was to be done for the Danish language. He pointed out that for this to happen it would be necessary to write a grammar and a dictionary to produce a written standard, and to convert the orally transmitted language forms to the written medium.

In 1685, Syv published the first grammar of Danish written in Danish (two other Latin grammars of Danish had been published in the preceding decades), named Grammatica or Den Danske Sprog-Kunst ("The Danish Language-Art") and began preparations for the first dictionary, which however was never finished. The grammar introduced Danish grammatical terminology to replace traditional latinate terms, for example, navnord (literally "name-word") replacing Latin Nomen and biord (literally "by-word") standing for adverbium.

In the 1680s, Syv prepared and published two volumes of Aldmindelige Danske Ord-Sproge og korte Lærdomme ("Common Danish Proverbs and Short Learnings"), containing some 15,000 Danish proverbs and idioms. This work is considered a classic in Danish literature. In 1695, Syv published a collection of folksongs Tohundrede Danske Viser ("Two Hundred Danish Songs"), which reprinted 100 folksongs published in 1591 by Anders Sørensen Vedel as well as 100 other songs. The work also included songs by his friend the priest Laurids Olufsen Kok. Among the songs in the collection are versions of Elveskud (of a knight seduced by an elven maid), and the well known song Thyra Danebod written by Kok.

Writing in 1878, Syv's biographer Frederik Winkel Horn describes him as primarily notable for his dedication to the Danish language, though not of outstanding wit. Horn notes that Syv's dictionary and grammatical writings had been influential in spite of their shortcomings, and that his main importance lay in his collections of proverbs and folksongs.
