= Jørgen Landt =

Danish priest, botanist and author (c. 1751–1804)

Jørgen Landt (c. 1751 – 26 June 1804) was a Danish priest, botanist and author, who published descriptions of the people and geography of the Faroe Islands.

Landt was born in the town of Vissenbjerg, on the island of Fünen, Denmark. He died 26. June 1804 in Olsker on Bornholm.

== Works ==
- Om tvende færøske Bløddyr. In: Naturhistorie-Selskabets Skrifter, IV. 1. Heft. 1797, S. 38-43
- Forsøg til en Beskrivelse over Færøerne. Kopenhagen 1800.
  - Nachdruck: Einars Prent og Forlag, Tórshavn 1965
  - A description of the Faroe Islands, containing an account of their situation, climate, and productions, together with the manners and customs of the inhabitants, their trade etc. 1810. (as George Landt)
