= Sundsøre =

Village in Denmark

Coordinates: 56.7084°N 9.1739°E

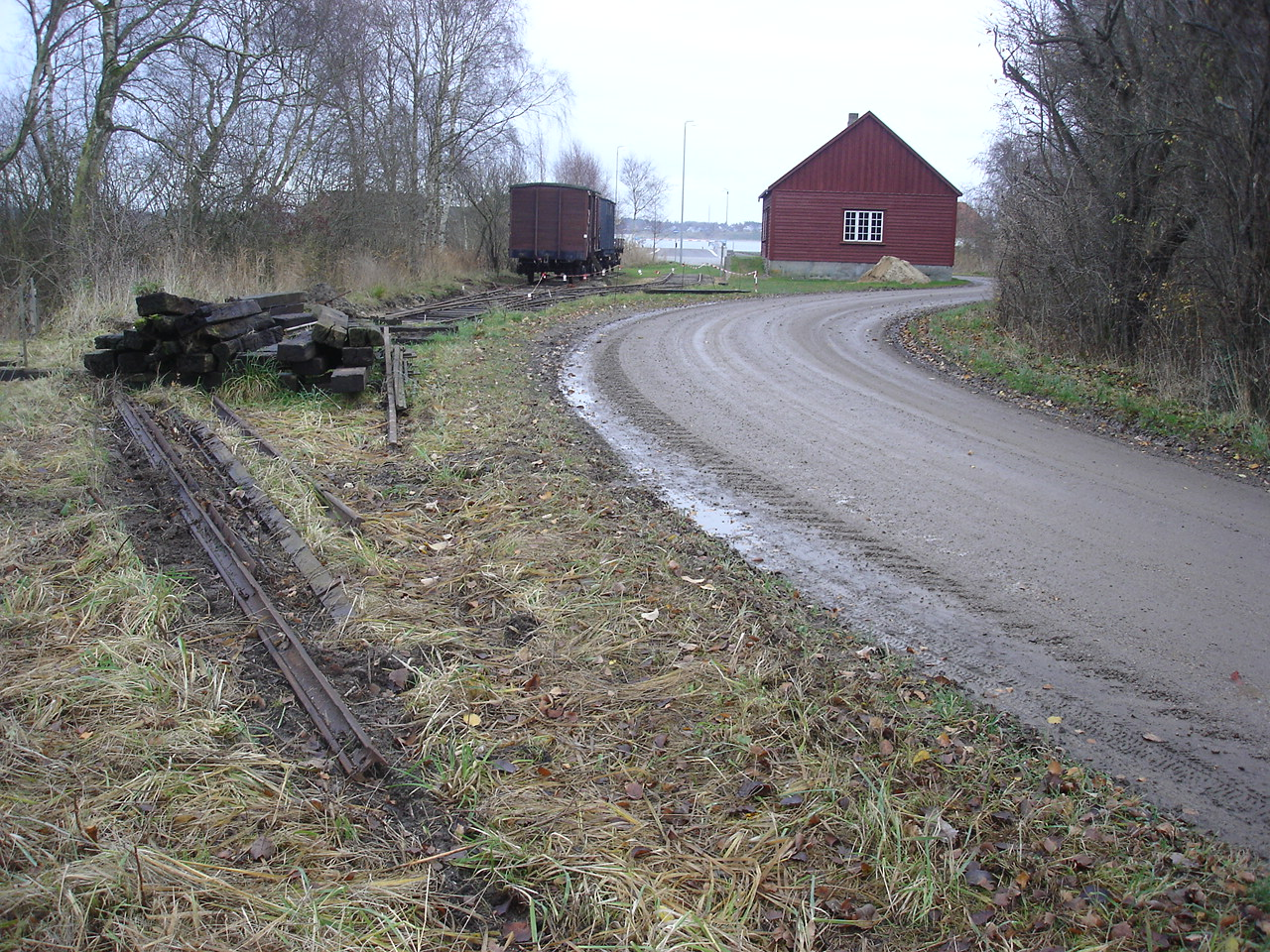
The remaining warehouse and railway tracks

Sundsøre is a small village with a ferry slip on the eastern side of the Salling peninsula in Skive Municipality, just across the Limfjord from Hvalpsund. The ferry terminal is situated by the 800-meter-long spit, Hvalp Hage, which extends into Hvalpsund—the narrow, deep strait in the Limfjord between Risgårde Bredning to the north and Skive Fjord to the south. Historically, this body of water was also known as Østersund.

The name Sundsøre was adopted by Sundsøre Municipality, which was incorporated into Skive Municipality during the 2007 municipal reform.

Adjacent to the ferry terminal is Sundsøre Kro, renamed Sundsørehus in 1993. Sundsøre Marina, located just north of the terminal, was developed between 1995 and 2005.

A ferry service connects Sundsøre to the town of Hvalpsund in Himmerland, with the crossing taking approximately 10 minutes.
