= Vissenbjerg =

- Town
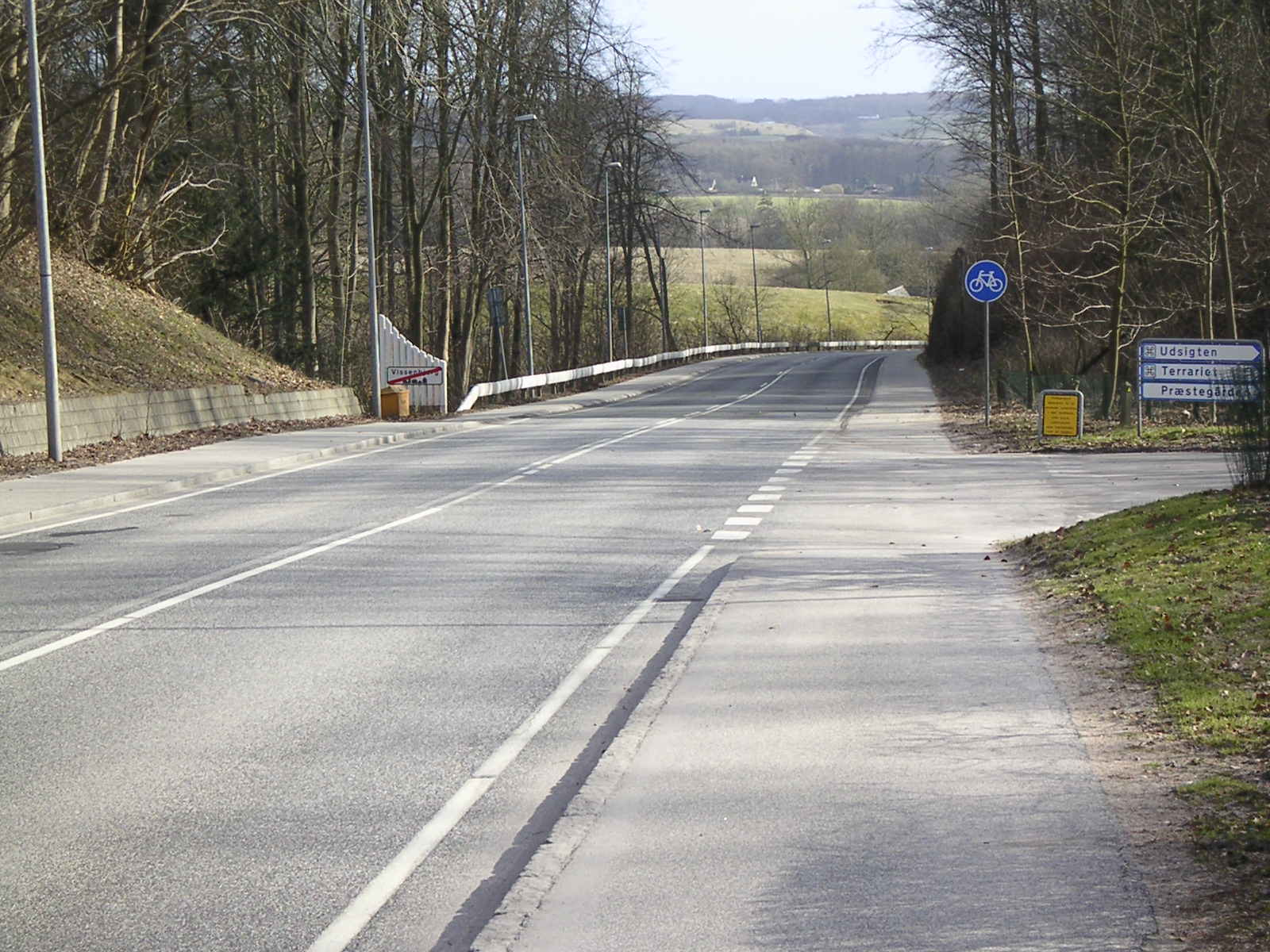

- Location in Denmark Vissenbjerg (Region of Southern Denmark)
- Coordinates: 55°23′7″N 10°7′55″E
- Country: Denmark
- Region: Southern Denmark
- Municipality: Assens Municipality

Area
  - Urban: 2.7 km^{2} (1.0 sq mi)

Population (2026)
  - Urban: 3,265
  - Urban density: 1,200/km^{2} (3,100/sq mi)
  - Gender: 1,610 males and 1,641 females
- Time zone: UTC+1 (CET)
  - Summer (DST): UTC+2 (CEST)
- Postal code: DK-5492 Vissenbjerg

Vissenbjerg is a town in central Denmark with a population of 3,265 (1 January 2026), located in Assens Municipality in the Region of Southern Denmark on the island of Funen.

== History ==
Vissenbjerg was the municipal seat of the former Vissenbjerg Municipality until it was merged with other municipalities into Assens Municipality on 1 January 2007.

=== Tradition ===
Røverfest – an annual local folk party dating back to 1964. The party offers processions, theme parties, congress market, and music events. It takes place over five days in August, usually in the last week of the month.

== Attractions ==
Terrariet Vissenbjerg Reptile Zoo: a reptile zoo and conservation center in Vissenbjerg with dozens of exotic animals.

Afgrunden Ved Vissenbjerg (The Chasm of Vissenbjerg): a national forest in Vissenbjerg, Denmark, featuring walking and hiking trails.

== Notable people ==
- Jørgen Landt (c.1751 in Vissenbjerg – 1804) a Danish priest, botanist and author, published descriptions of the people and geography of the Faroe Islands
- Anna Sarauw (1839 – 1919 in Vissenbjerg Sogn) was a Danish textile artist who helped run a successful embroidery business in Copenhagen
- Lars Elstrup (born 1963 in Råby) a Danish former professional footballer, won 340 club caps in Denmark and abroad, played 34 matches and scored 13 goals for Denmark; he lived in Vissenbjerg, but currently resides in Hellerup, staying out of the public eye.
