= Kleppen =

Kleppen is a surname. Notable people with the surname include:

- Halvor Kleppen (born 1947), Norwegian media personality, theme park owner, and writer
- Hans Kleppen (1907–2009), Norwegian ski jumper

== See also ==
- Kleppen, Norway
- Klepper
