= Bredsten =

- Village
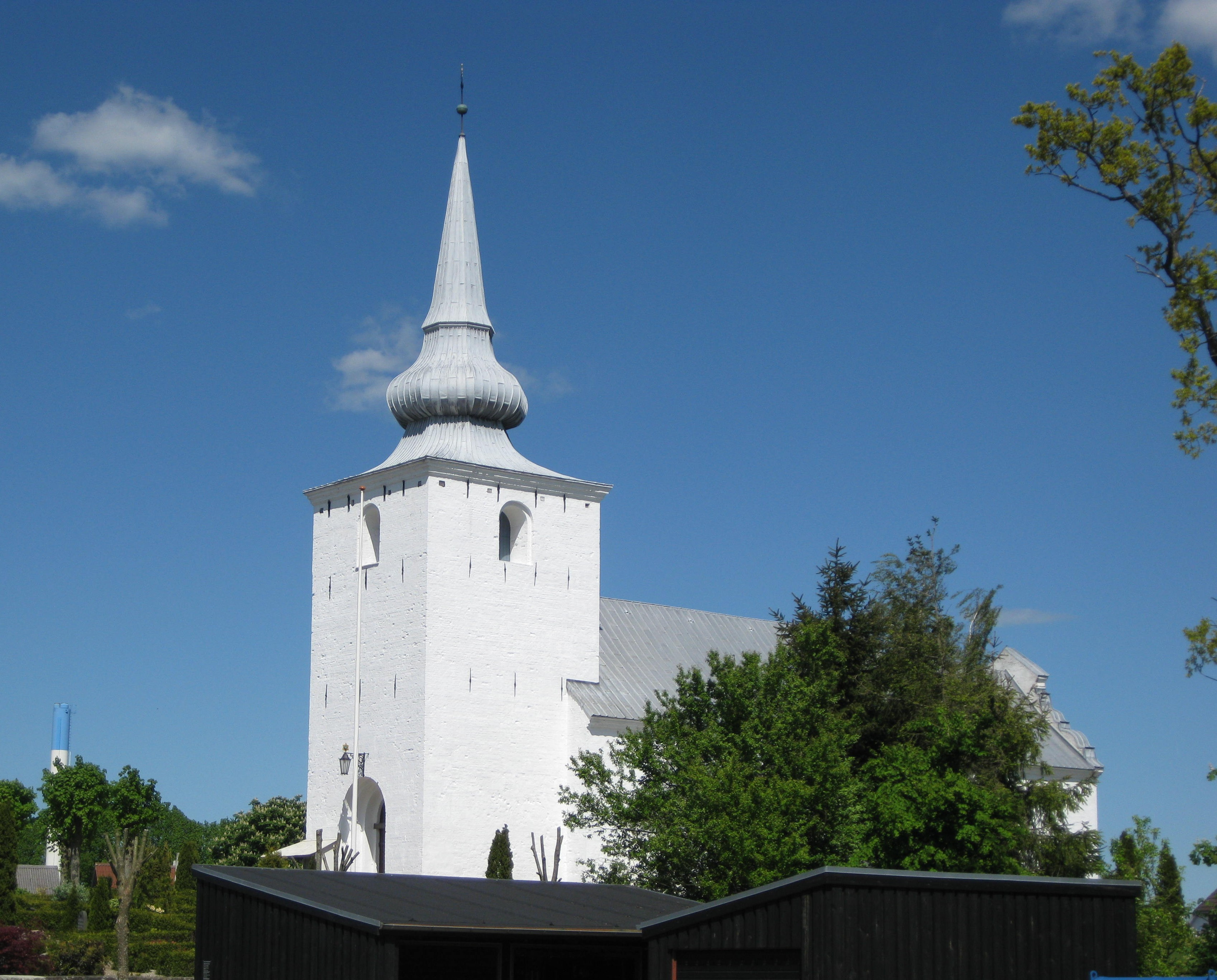
- Bredsten Church

- Location in Region of Southern Denmark Bredsten (Denmark)
- Coordinates: 55°42′9″N 9°22′55″E
- Country: Denmark
- Region: Southern Denmark
- Municipality: Vejle Municipality

Area
  - Urban: 1.4 km^{2} (0.54 sq mi)

Population (2026)
  - Urban: 1,881
  - Urban density: 1,300/km^{2} (3,500/sq mi)
- Time zone: UTC+1 (CET)
  - Summer (DST): UTC+2 (CEST)
- Postal code: DK-7182 Bredsten

Bredsten is a village in Vejle Municipality, Denmark. Bredsten is situated 11 kilometres west of Vejle, and it has a population of 1,881 (1 January 2026). The village is quite old, indicated by the church which dates back to the Middle Ages though modified by the local entrepreneur de Lichtenberg in the 1740s.

Bredsten is known for a few famous persons, among them businessman Harry Motor, the former editor of BT, Arne Ullum, the Grand Champion of the quiz show Jeopardy, Jens Madsen, Lars Døhr, former soccer player in Vejle Boldklub and the former soccer legend John Sivebæk.
