= Søren Christian Gjessing =

Norwegian military officer and cartographer

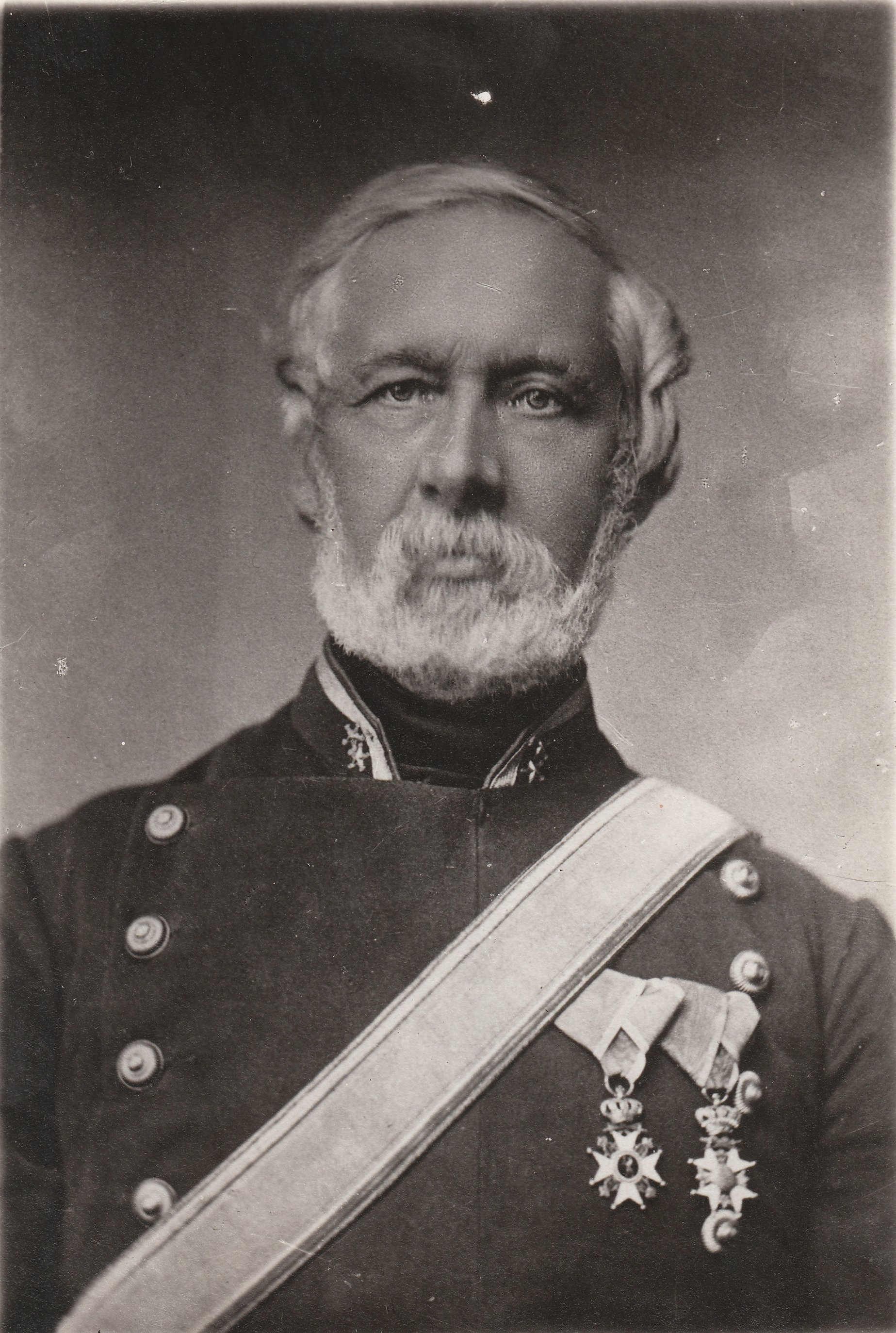
Søren Christian Gjessing

Søren Christian Gjessing (18 December 1812 – 18 March 1897) was a Norwegian military officer and cartographer.

He was born in Oddernes as a son of Premier Lieutenant Mads Dahl Gjessing and his wife Aasille Aabel. He was an uncle of engineer Alf Gjessing. In January 1842 in Kristiania he married Sara Glückstad (1820–1856).

In the military he reached the ranks of second lieutenant in the Artillery in 1834, premier lieutenant in 1842, captain in 1849 and lieutenant colonel in 1860. He commanded the standing battalions of Trondhjem from 1860 to 1875 and Kristiania from 1875 to 1889. He was promoted to colonel in the Army in 1880 and colonel in the Artillery in 1889. He published several articles in military journals, and was vice praeses of the Royal Norwegian Society of Sciences and Letters in Trondhjem for some time. He was also employed by the Norwegian Mapping and Cadastre Authority (then known as Norges Geografiske Oppmåling) between 1839 and 1863, succeeding Gerhard Munthe and N. A. Ramm as official map designer. Gjessing died in March 1897 in Kristiania.
