= Ejstrup =

Ejstrup is a Danish surname. Notable people with the surname include:

- Grith Ejstrup (born 1953), Danish athlete
- Kaj Ejstrup (1902–1956), Danish artist, illustrator, and sculptor
