= Låsby =

- Town
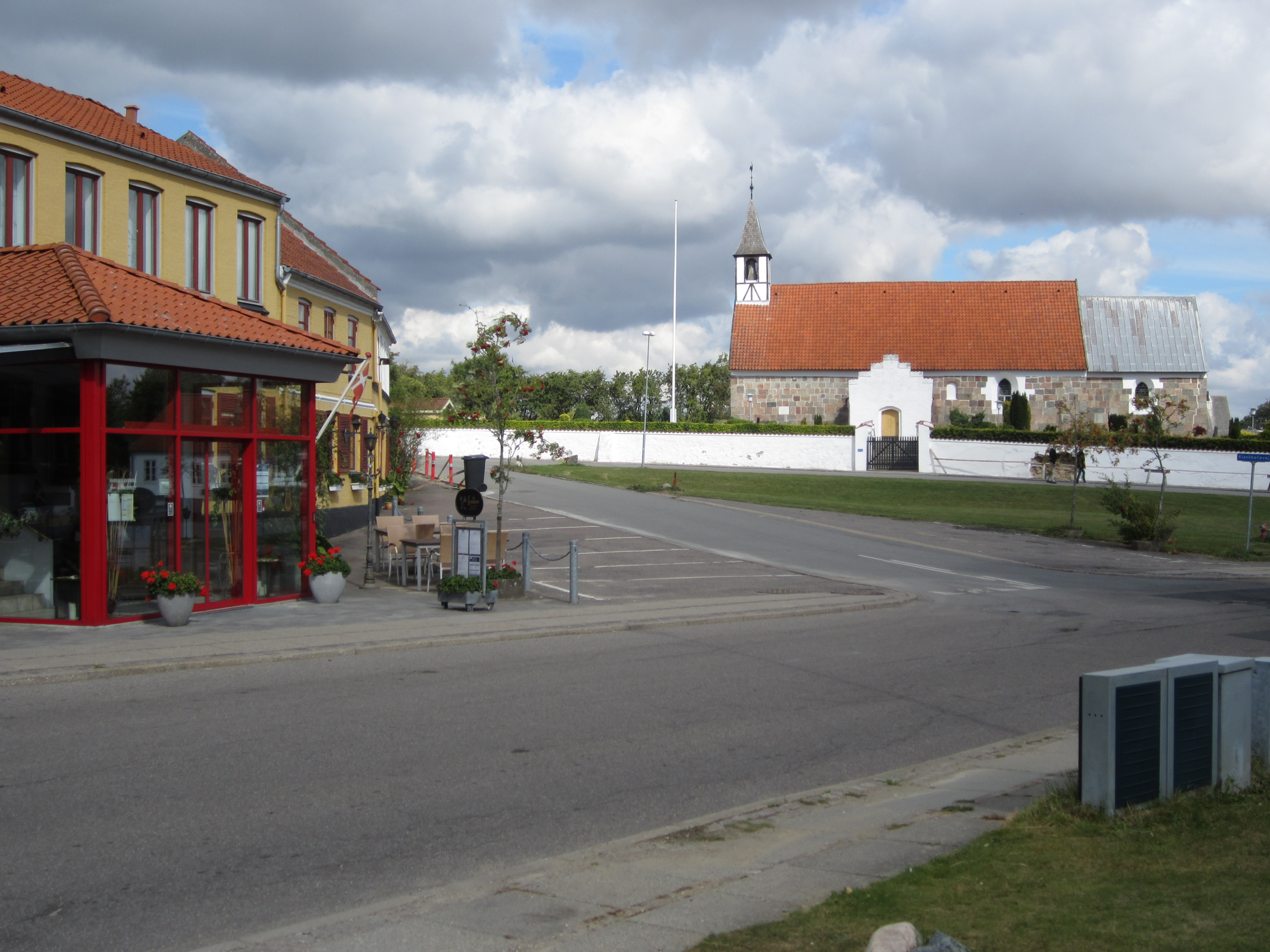

- Location in Denmark Låsby (Central Denmark Region)
- Coordinates: 56°09′04″N 9°48′42″E
- Country: Denmark
- Region: Region Midtjylland
- Municipality: Skanderborg

Area
  - Urban: 1.52 km^{2} (0.59 sq mi)

Population (2026)
  - Urban: 2,059
  - Urban density: 1,350/km^{2} (3,510/sq mi)
- Time zone: UTC+1 (CET)
  - Summer (DST): UTC+2 (CEST)
- Postal code: DK-8670 Låsby

Låsby is a town in the province of Jutland in Denmark with a population of 2,059 (1 January 2026). It is situated on the main road between Silkeborg and Aarhus.

The town was the location of the flagship property of Det Blå Marked (trans. "The Blue Market"), a chain of Danish antique markets, and which was a major tourist attraction, bringing in over half a million visitors to the town every year. Det Blå Marked was closed in summer 2021, as fewer and fewer visitors came in recent years.

== Notable people ==
- Thomas S. Hermansen (1867–1930), filmmaker
