= Rynkeby =

Village in Kerteminde Municipality, Denmark

- Village
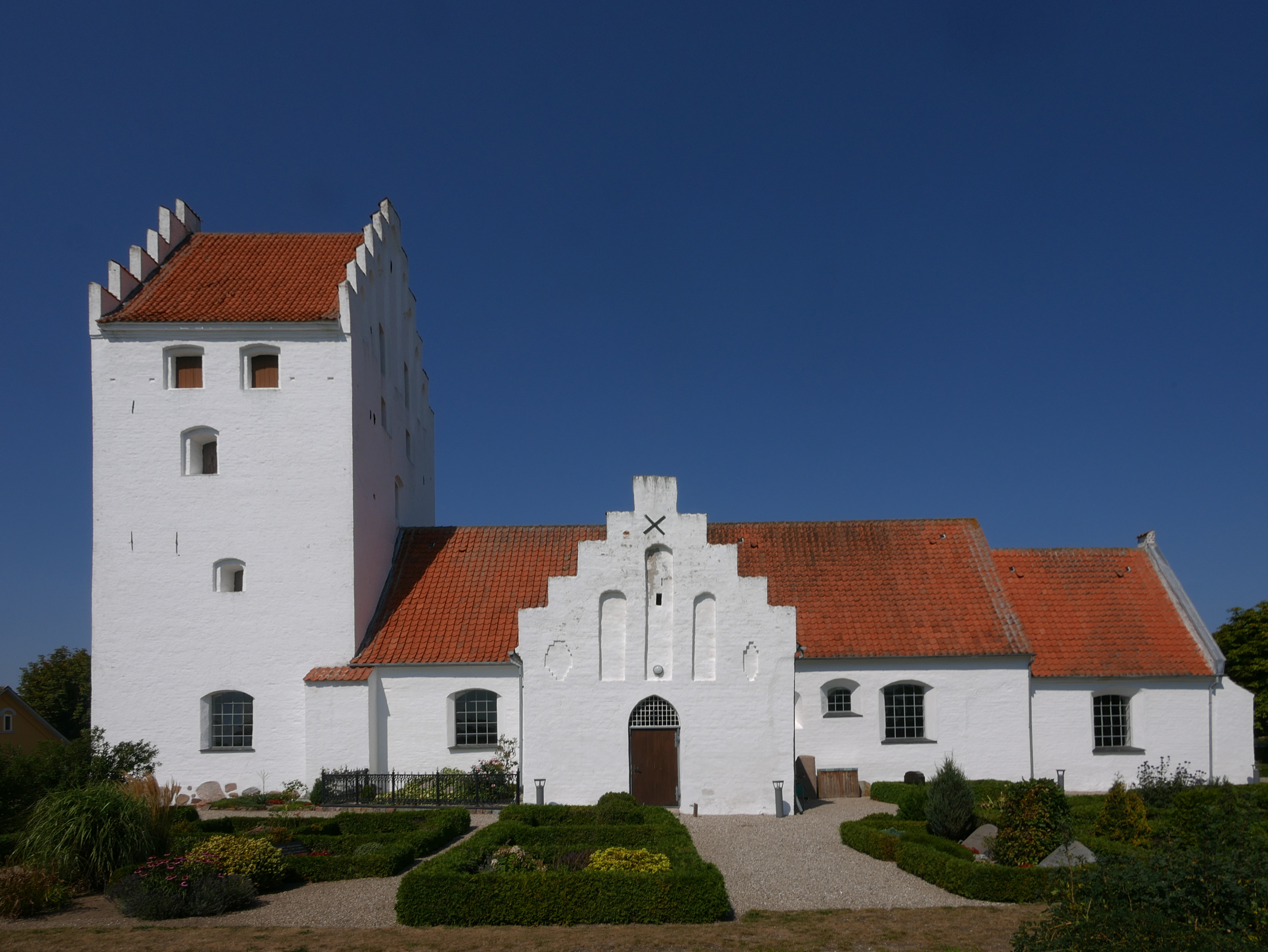
- Rynkeby Church

- Location in Region of Southern Denmark Rynkeby (Denmark)
- Coordinates: 55°23′51″N 10°36′34″E
- Country: Denmark
- Region: Southern Denmark
- Municipality: Kerteminde Municipality

Population (2026)
  - Total: 591

Rynkeby is a village, with a population of 591 as of 1 January 2026, in Kerteminde Municipality, the Region of Southern Denmark in Denmark.

Rynkeby is situated on the island of Funen, 17 km northwest of Nyborg, 15 km east of Odense and 8 km southwest of Kerteminde.

Rynkeby Church is located in the village.
