= Just Gjessing =

Norwegian geographer

- Born: 13 July 1926; Oslo
- Died: 29 October 2005 (aged 79)
- Citizenship: Norway
- Education: University of Oslo
- Known for: Study of deglaciation, hydropower environmental impact assessments, promoting environmental studies in Norway
- Scientific career
- Fields: Quaternary geology, geomorphology, environmental science
- Workplaces: University of Oslo

Just Gjessing (Oslo, 13 July 1926 – 29 October 2005) was a Norwegian geographer. Gjessing obtained a Ph.D. degree in 1960 with a study on Norway’s hydrology during deglaciation. One year later he was appointed full professor. In the late 1960s Gjessing became increasingly interested in nature conservation so that in the 1970s shifted the focus of his research into environmental impact assessments. This meant leaving behind his work on pure fluvial geomorphology that had previously brought him acclaim. Following this interest he joined in 1967 the Oslo University’s Commission for Watercourse Regulation. In 1971 he became chairman of the commission while also entering the Joint Commission for Hydroelectric Power Development and Nature Conservation, of which he was a member until 1981. He co-authored various notable books including Beste Store Norge Atlas (1983) and the five volume work Norge (1984–1986) and the journal Norsk Geografisk Tidsskrift from 1979 to 1987. In the 1980s the work of Gjessing turned increasingly international with many travels to West and North Africa where he studied environmental issues in arid and semi-arid landscapes. Gjessing’s personality and approach made him subject of strong and lasting criticism from so-called “rejectionist” even within his own department at the University of Oslo. Despite their opposition Gjessing managed to establish the course Resource Geography and Landscape Ecology in 1985, attending student demands that had emerged in the 1970s about the need of courses on natural resources and environmental management.

== See also ==
- Åke Sundborg
