= Alf Gjessing =

Norwegian engineer

Alf Gjessing (7 September 1864 – 6 July 1922) was a Norwegian engineer.

He was born in Kristiania as a son of Mathias Dahl Gjessing and Amalie Beate Just. He was a nephew of Colonel Søren Christian Gjessing. In June 1896 he married Maja Riddervold Waage, a daughter of professor Peter Waage.

He took his education at the Technical University of Hannover. He graduated in 1887, and returned to Norway to work for Thune. After a second stay in Hannover from 1890 to 1891, studying railway and bridge engineering, he found work in the Norwegian State Railways and Kristiania municipality. In 1895 he was employed as a teacher of mechanical technology at Kristiania Technical School (today a part of Oslo University College). He was promoted to professor in July 1911.

From 1898 to 1900 he was the editor of machinery in Teknisk Ugeblad. He was also involved in the Norwegian Industrial Property Office and the Norwegian Association of Engineers. He died suddenly in July 1922, during a study trip with students to Magdeburg.
