= Lundeborg =

- Town
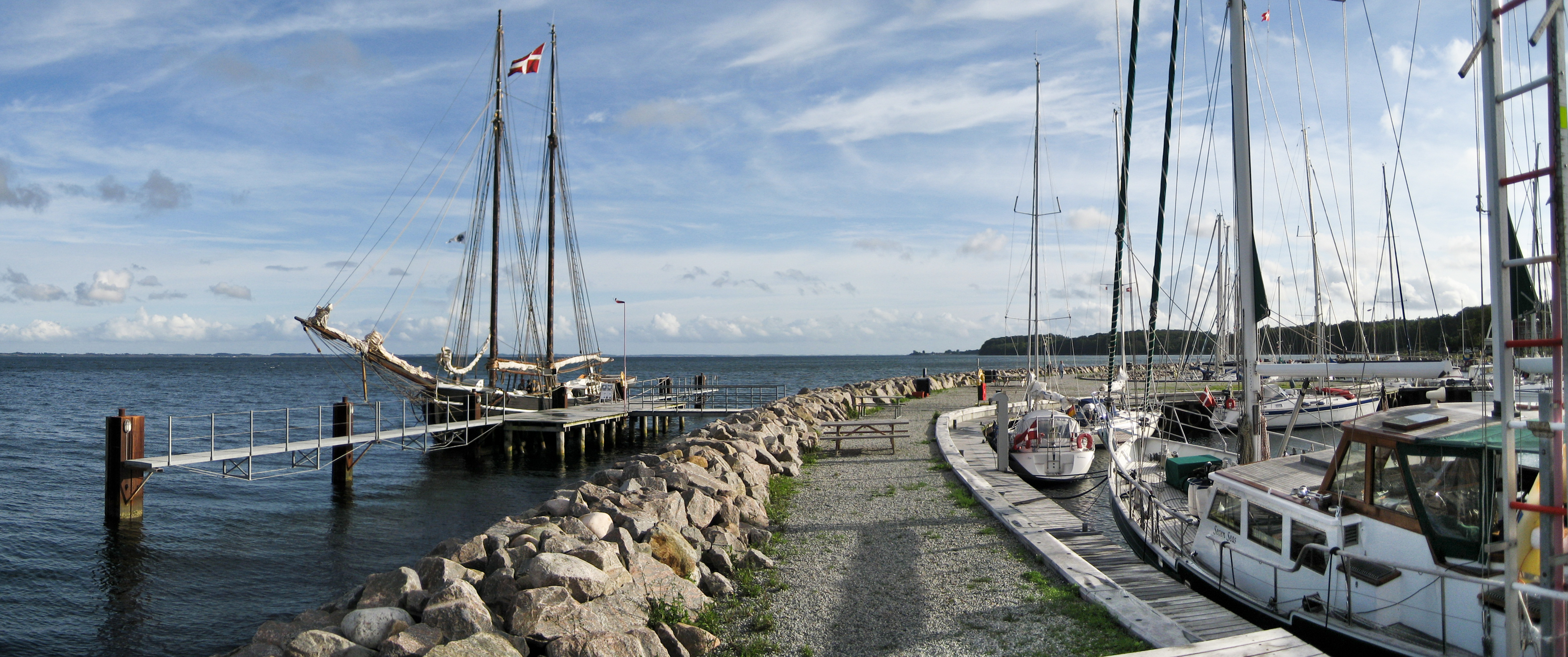
- Marina in Lundeborg

- Location in the Region of Southern Denmark
- Coordinates: 55°8′26″N 10°46′59″E
- Country: Denmark
- Region: Southern Denmark
- Municipality: Svendborg

Population (2026)
  - Total: 424
- Time zone: UTC+1 (CET)
  - Summer (DST): UTC+2 (CEST)

Lundeborg is a small harbor town located on the island of Funen in south-central Denmark, in Svendborg Municipality.
