= Søndersø =

Søndersø may refer to:

- Søndersø (Furesø Municipality), a lake in Furesø Municipality, Denmark
- Søndersø (Lolland), a lake on Lolland, Denmark
- Søndersø (town), a town in Denmark
- Søndersø Municipality, a former municipality of Denmark
