= Sandvig =

Sandvig is a surname. Notable people with the surname include:

- Bertel Christian Sandvig (1752–1786 ), Danish historian
- Anders Sandvig (1862–1950), Norwegian dentist
- Bente Sandvig, Norwegian politician
- Dagmar Sandvig (1921–1989), Norwegian politician
- Helene Sandvig (born 1968), Norwegian journalist
