= Nekso (company) =

Vehicle for hire services company

- Industry: Vehicle for hire
- Founded: Toronto, Canada (June 24, 2015)
- Founders: Vahid Akbari (CEO); Azam Mohabbatian
- Headquarters: Toronto, Canada
- Number of locations: 10 countries (May 2017)
- Key people: Domingo Guzman, Milad Zabihi; Kevin McLaughlin; David Winterstein
- Website: nekso.io

Nekso is a company that offers vehicle for hire services in Central and South America. Its mobile app allows users to book a taxi and track it in real time.

== History ==
Nekso is subsidiary of Blanclink, a holding company that started in Toronto. Currently, Nekso has offices in Venezuela, Panama, Ecuador, Dominican Republic, and Toronto. The application can be downloaded for on devices running Android and iOS, and the user should register a profile with their information, pictures and the payment cards with which they could schedule or cancel the service.

Currently the company is operating in countries in South America and Central America such as Ecuador, Venezuela, Dominican Republic, as well as Colombia, Costa Rica, Guatemala, Panama, South America, Peru, Argentina, Chile and Mexico. Nekso is also planning for expanding its services to cities in USA and Canada.

The Nekso app is available on iOS and Android. It provides a mobile application that serves as a network between users and taxi lines, The taxi user can utilize technology to find taxi service in their vicinity, schedule for a trip and make a transaction. Also, there is panic button that can be accessed by the user and the driver to have his/her location shared if he/she is in danger. At the end of the service the application gives the user the option to rate the driver. The app does not charge passengers, however, it takes a certain percentage of each taxi fare.

There are other similar companies that provide E-hailing services such as Easy Taxi, UnTaxi, Auto Amigo. Unlike Uber that competes with licensed taxi companies around the world, these services partnered directly with taxi firms.

In October 2017, Wall Street Journal reported that Nekso facilitates 400,000 rides per month and also has 140,000 active monthly users on its platform. The company CEO also announced Nekso's plan to expand their services to some Canadian and U.S cities.

== Awards ==
Blanclink, the parent company of Nekso, was chosen as one of Top 50 Startup by Silicon Valley's TiE50 in 2015.
