= Kongerslev =

- Town
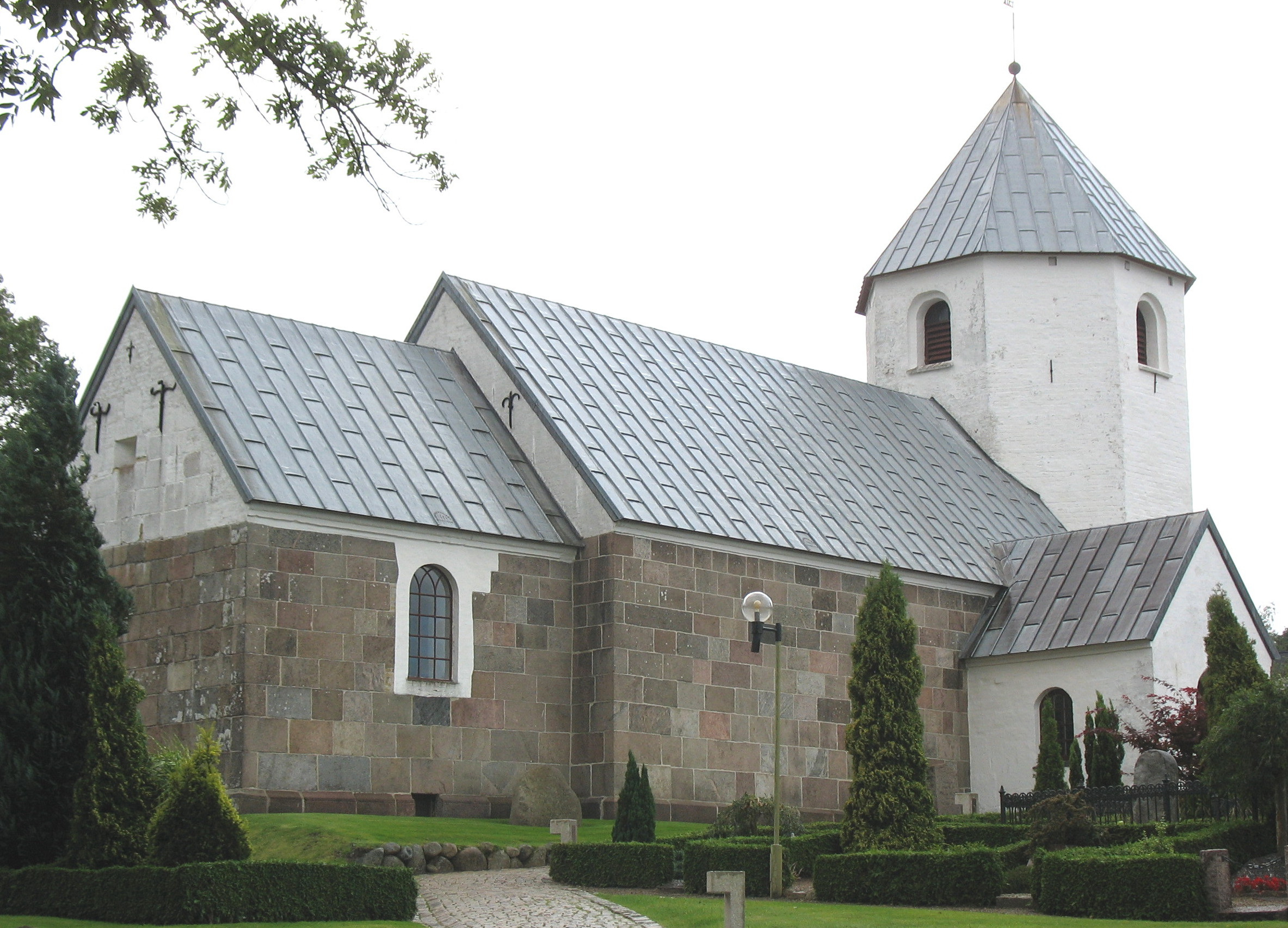
- Sønder Kongerslev Church in Kongerslev

- Location in Denmark Kongerslev (North Jutland Region)
- Coordinates: 56°53′7″N 10°6′56″E
- Country: Denmark
- Region: North Jutland Region
- Municipality: Aalborg Municipality
- Parish: Sønder Kongerslev

Area
  - Urban: 1.2 km^{2} (0.46 sq mi)

Population (2026)
  - Urban: 1,294
  - Urban density: 1,100/km^{2} (2,800/sq mi)
- Time zone: UTC+1 (CET)
  - Summer (DST): UTC+2 (CEST)
- Postal code: DK-9293 Kongerslev

Kongerslev is a town, with a population of 1,294 (1 January 2026), in Aalborg Municipality, North Jutland Region in Denmark. It is located 23 km north of Hadsund and 27 km southeast of Aalborg.

Sønder Kongerslev Church is located on a hill in the southern part of the town close to Kongerslev Hede.

The old manor house Kongstedlund is located 3 km to the southeast between Kongerslev and Lille Vildmose.
