= Marcus Jacob Monrad =

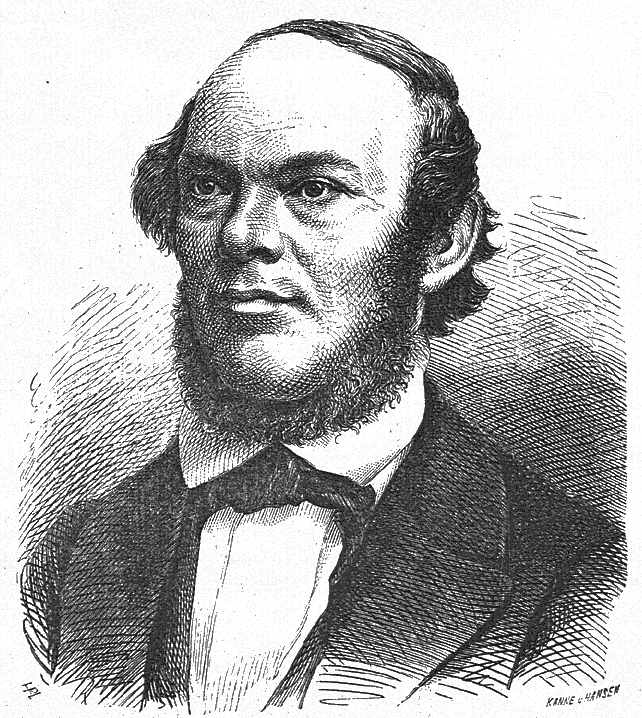
- Marcus Jacob Monrad, engraving by Hans Peter Hansen
- Born: 19 January 1816; Nøtterøy, Norway
- Died: 30 December 1897 (aged 81); Kristiania
- Occupation: Philosopher
- Relatives: Cally Monrad (granddaughter)

Marcus Jacob Monrad (19 January 1816 – 30 December 1897) was a Norwegian philosopher, a university professor for more than 40 years.

== Biography ==
Monrad was born in Nøtterøy to parish priest Peder Monrad and Severine Elisabeth Ambroe, and grew up in Mo in Telemark. He graduated as cand.theol. in 1840, and was appointed professor at the Royal Frederick University in 1851. Around 1850 he published three textbooks for the examen philosophicum, which were used for these courses during the rest of the 19th century. Monrad took part in contemporary debates and had significant influence, but was also controversial. He is portrayed in Arne Garborg's 1883 novel Bondestudentar and in Alexander Kielland's 1888 comedy Professoren.
