= Hellested =

- Village
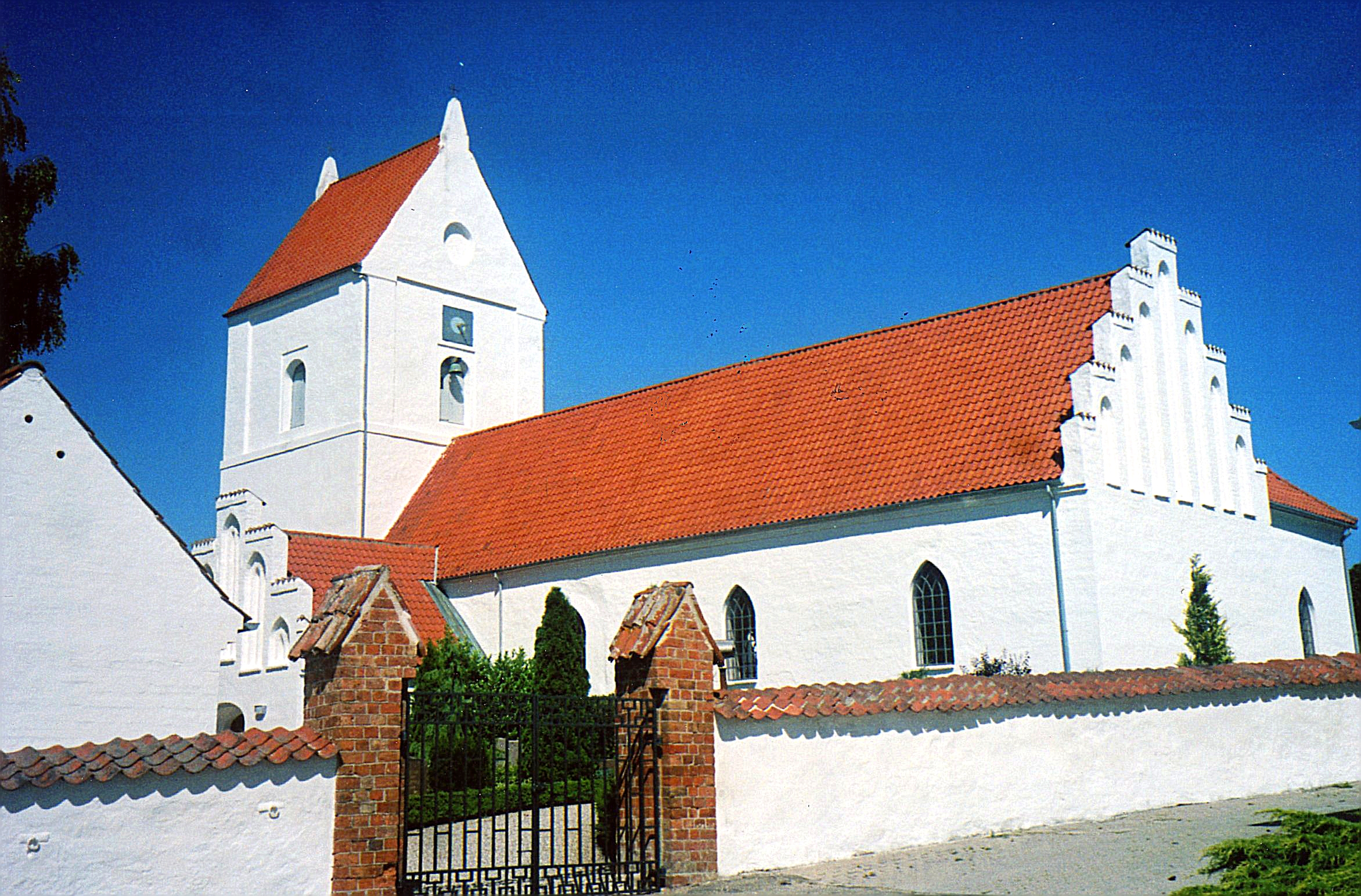
- Hellested Church

- Location in Region Zealand Hellested (Denmark)
- Coordinates: 55°19′44″N 12°14′49″E
- Country: Denmark
- Region: Region Zealand
- Municipality: Stevns Municipality

Population (2026)
  - Total: 557

Hellested is a village, with a population of 557 (1 January 2026), in Stevns Municipality, Region Zealand in Denmark. It is located 4 km (2.5 mi) south of Hårlev, 4 km (2.5 mi) northeast of Karise and 17 km (11 mi) south of Køge.

Hellested Church is located in the village. It dates back to the 12th century, and a small part of the longwalls still remains. The nave is built of chalk-stone from Stevns Klint and had originally a flat raftered ceiling.
