= Kleppen, Norway =

Kleppen
- Borough
- Interactive map of Kleppen
- Location within Trøndelag Location within Norway
- Coordinates: 64.47602°N 11.53139°E
- Country: Norway
- Region: Central Norway
- County: Trøndelag
- District: Namdalen
- City: Namsos
- Elevation: 13 m (43 ft)
- Time zone: UTC+01:00 (CET)
  - Summer (DST): UTC+02:00 (CEST)
- Post Code: 7805 Namsos

Kleppen is a borough within the town of Namsos in Namsos Municipality in Trøndelag county, Norway. It lies about 2 kilometres (1.2 mi) north-northeast of town centre and borders the suburbs of Fossbrenna, Bjørum, Østbyen, Rønningåsen and Høknes. The area is named after the small farm of Kleppen, which then gave its name to the area.

Kleppen is home to the Høknes primary school. Kleppen sports club, established 1959, has two sports halls and football pitches, including Kleppen stadium, where Namsos IL play their home games. In a former shelter in the mountains is the swimming club "Oasen".
