= Gistrup =

- Town
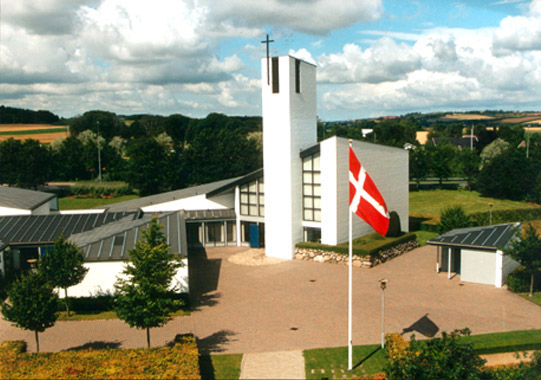
- Gistrup Church

- Location in Denmark Gistrup (North Jutland Region)
- Coordinates: 56°59′52″N 9°59′36″E
- Country: Denmark
- Region: North Jutland Region
- Municipality: Aalborg Municipality

Area
  - Urban: 2 km^{2} (0.77 sq mi)

Population (2026)
  - Urban: 3,679
  - Urban density: 1,800/km^{2} (4,800/sq mi)
  - Gender: 1,779 males and 1,900 females
- Time zone: UTC+1 (CET)
  - Summer (DST): UTC+2 (CEST)
- Postal code: DK-9260 Gistrup

Gistrup is a satellite community just outside Aalborg, Denmark. Located some 10 km (6.2 mi) southeast of Aalborg's city centre, it belongs to Aalborg Municipality in the North Jutland Region. Gistrup has a population of 3,679 (1 January 2026).

== Origins and Early History ==
Gistrup's history, like many towns in Denmark, likely dates back to the medieval period or even earlier. However, specific historical records from its earliest days might be scarce, as is common with small towns. The area around Gistrup has been inhabited for centuries, with evidence of settlements and agricultural activity dating back to the Viking Age and earlier. The name "Gistrup" itself suggests a settlement or a farm, which was a common naming convention in Denmark, where names often ended in "-rup," "-bøl," or "-sted," indicating the type of settlement.

== Development Over the Centuries ==
Through the centuries, Gistrup would have been influenced by the broader historical events in Denmark, including the transition from Viking rule to a unified Danish kingdom, the Reformation, and the various wars that Denmark participated in or was affected by. The economic and social life of Gistrup, like many rural towns, would have been centered around agriculture, with most of the population engaged in farming and related activities.

== 20th Century to Present ==
The 20th century brought significant changes to towns all over Denmark, including Gistrup. The advent of industrialization, improvements in transportation, and changes in the economy led to shifts in how people lived and worked. For Gistrup, this meant gradual growth and development, with more people moving to the area for its quality of life and proximity to larger urban centers like Aalborg.

Today, Gistrup has developed a close-knit community. It has modern amenities and services, schools, sports facilities, and green spaces, making it an attractive place for families and individuals looking for an experience closer to nature but still within reach of a larger city's conveniences.

== Cultural and Natural Aspects ==
Gistrup and its surrounding areas offer various cultural and natural attractions, including beautiful landscapes, walking trails, and historical sites. These aspects contribute to the town's appeal as a place where history and modernity blend harmoniously.
