= Hvalpsund =

- Town
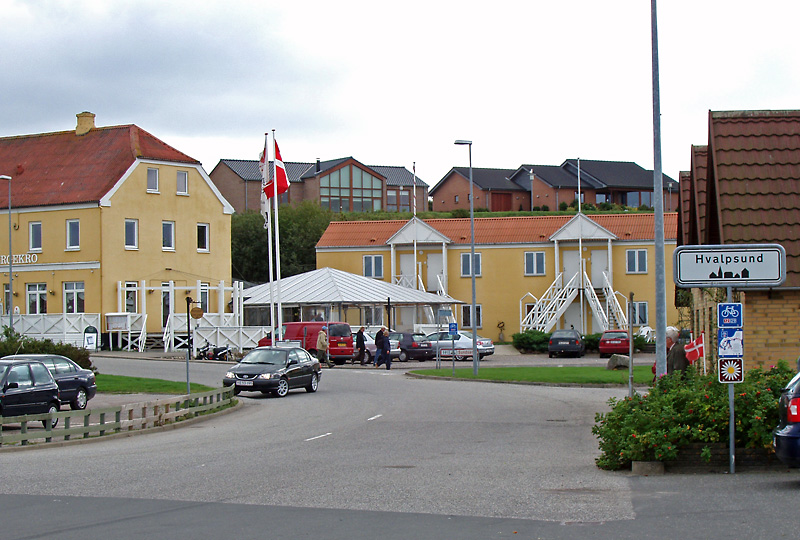

- Location in Denmark
- Coordinates: 56°42′07″N 9°12′08″E
- Country: Denmark
- Region: Region Nordjylland
- Municipality: Vesthimmerland

Population (2026)
  - Total: 638
- Time zone: UTC+1 (CET)
  - Summer (DST): UTC+1 (CEST)
- Postal code: 9640
- Website: http://www.hvalpsund-by.dk/

Hvalpsund is a ferry port in Himmerland with a population of 638 (1 January 2026), located 20 km west of Aalestrup, 12 km southwest of Farsø and 25 km southwest of Aars. The town belongs to the municipality of Vesthimmerland Municipality and is located in the Region Nordjylland.

== History ==
=== Færgekroen ===
The first royal license to run a ferry on the sound is from 1532. Because of the strong stream the ferry was a kind of barge that was rowed by 4 men. In 1549 the king, Christian III ordered the ferry to be established, and a ferry house was to be built for the travelers. On July 20, 1669, Hvalpsund Færgekro was privileged, and the innkeeper was responsible for both the ferry and the inn, as he had already done for some years. Only in 1716 was the crown a decisive body of privilege, which also gave him the right to serve food, beer and brandy for local residents.

== Railway ==
Aars-Nibe-Svenstrup Railway, opened in 1899, was extended in 1910 from Aars to Hvalpsund and changed its name to Aalborg-Hvalpsund Railway. As the railroad terminal, Hvalpsund received a two-track turntable with a turntable and two log houses for overnight rail and mail staff. The railway station was closed in 1969. The station building is preserved at Havnepladsen 64. The harbor also shows the bus station, the log house, which was opened in 2012 as a small railway, ferry port and fishing port. In addition, Hvalpsund Borgerforening has borrowed an old wagon of Mariager-Handest Veteran Railway.
