= Bro =

Bro or BRO may refer to:

== Arts and entertainment ==
- Bro (novel), by Vladimir Sorokin
- Bro (2021 film), an Indian Telugu-language family drama film
- Bro (2023 film), an Indian Telugu-language fantasy comedy film
- Bro (instrument), a Vietnamese musical instrument
- "B.R.O. (Better Ride Out)", 2022 song by A Boogie wit da Hoodie

== Groups, organizations, companies ==
- Big Red One, nickname of the US 1st Infantry Division
- Border Roads Organisation, Indian military unit
- Bro (TV channel), Philippines

== People ==
- Bro (singer) (born 1996), born Kevin Andreasen, Danish singer
- Albin C. Bro (1893–1956), American missionary, educator and diplomat
- Jakob Bro (born 1978), Danish guitarist and composer
- Margueritte Harmon Bro (1894–1977), American minister, missionary in China, and author
- Nicolas Bro (born 1972), Danish actor
- René Brô (1930–1986), French artist

== Places ==
- 10128 Bro, one of the asteroids in the main belt
- Bro, Stockholm, Sweden
- Bro, Gotland, Sweden
- Kristinehamn, formerly Bro or Broo, Värmland County, Sweden
- Brownsville/South Padre Island International Airport, Texas, U.S., IATA code

== Other ==
- Bro culture, male partying subculture
- BrO-23, a primary glider built in the USSR in the early 1980s
- Bro, later Zeek, a network analysis framework
- Broughtonia or Bro, an orchid genus

== See also ==
- Brother, a male sibling
- BrO
- Bros (disambiguation)
- Bruh (disambiguation)
