= Aars =

Aars Års
- Town
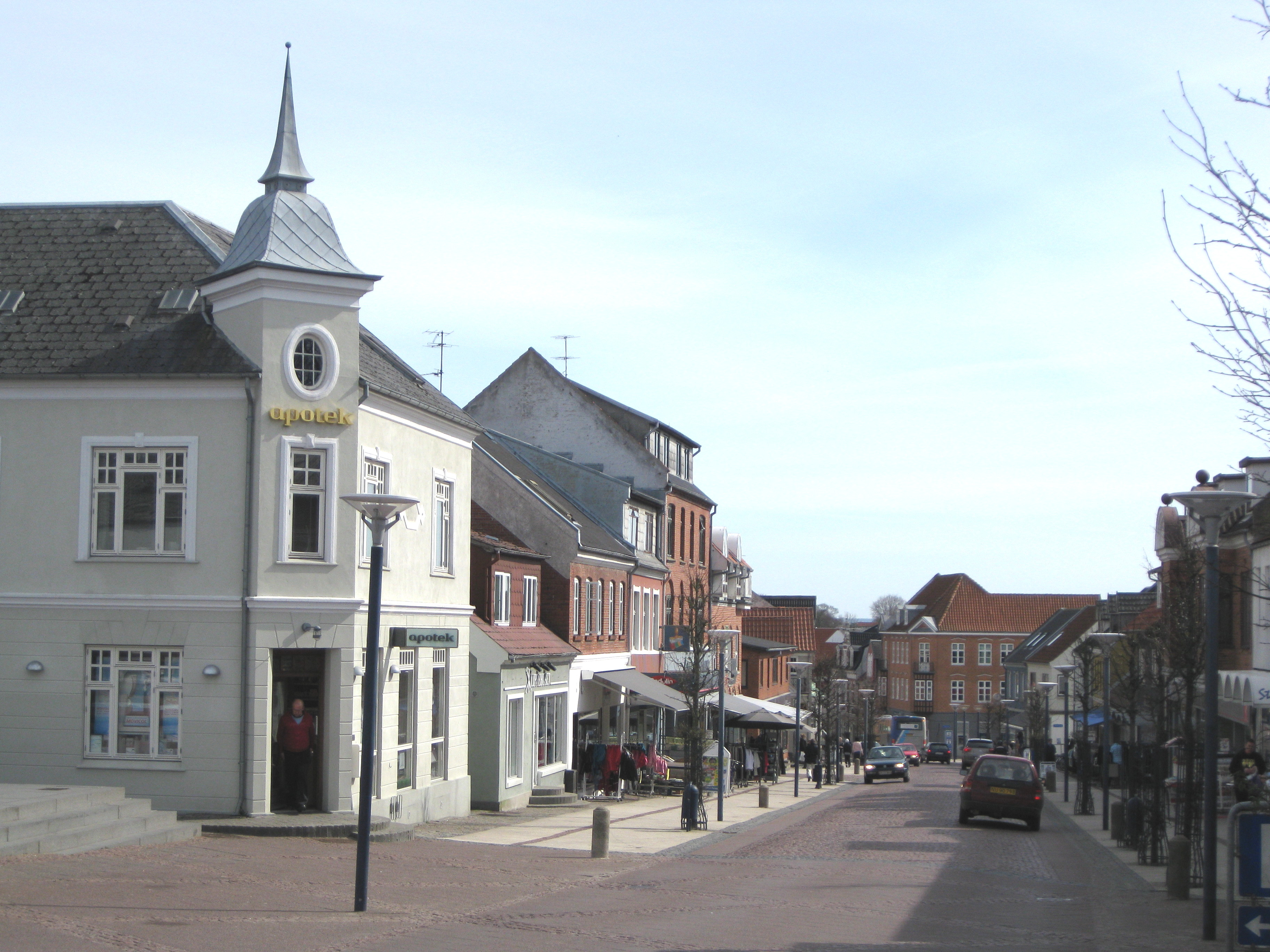
- The mainstreet in the town of Aars.

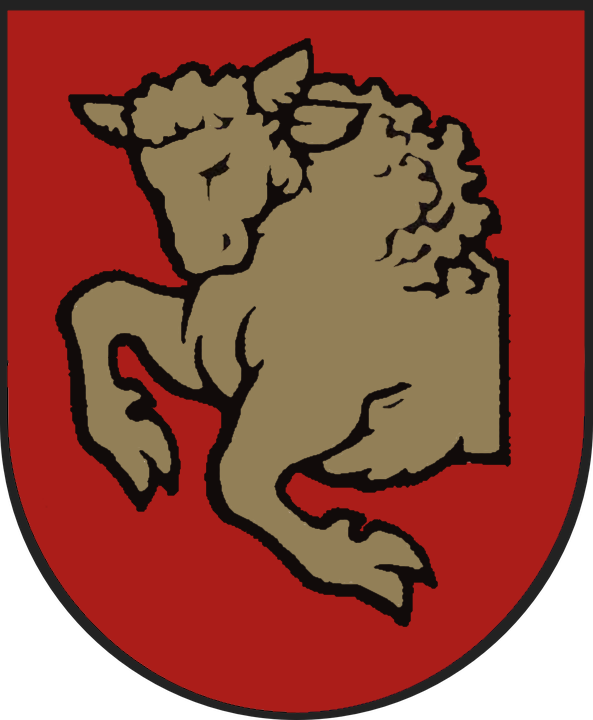
- Coat of arms
- Nickname: Cimbri's town
- Motto: Aars can the art (Danish: Aars kan kunsten)
- Location in Denmark Aars (North Jutland Region)
- Coordinates: 56°48′11.7″N 9°31′03.9″E
- Country: Denmark
- Region: Region Nordjylland
- Municipality: Vesthimmerland
- Foundation: 14th century
- Railway town: 1893

Government
  - Mayor: Per Bach Laursen

Area
  - Urban: 6.2 km^{2} (2.4 sq mi)

Population (2026)
  - Urban: 8,738
  - Urban density: 1,400/km^{2} (3,700/sq mi)
  - Gender: 4,246 males and 4,492 females
- Time zone: UTC+1 (CET)
  - Summer (DST): UTC+1 (CEST)
- Postal code: DK-9600 Aars
- Website: http://www.aars.dk/

Aars or Års, (Note: According to Retskrivningsordbogen § 3.2, both are correct.) (Danish pronunciation: [ˈɒˀs]) is a Danish town with a population of 8,738 (1 January 2026) in Himmerland, Denmark. Administratively, Aars is the municipal seat of Vesthimmerland Municipality and biggest town of Vesthimmerland Municipality, Region Nordjylland since 2007 and it was also the seat of the mayor in the now abolished Aars Municipality. The town was founded in the 14th century. It is one of the four principal towns of Vesthimmerland, the other ones being Farsø, Løgstør and Aalestrup. Aars is a former railway town. It is currently the 77th largest city in Denmark just behind Nivå but in front of Løgten in Aarhus Municipality. It is the 11th biggest town/city in Region Nordjylland in front of Svenstrup but just behind Nykøbing Mors. The town has the nickname Cimbri's town (Danish: Kimbrenes by).

== History ==
=== Name ===
The name Aars first appears in 1345. The site name researcher Svend Aakjær's statement was that it originates from the Old Norse / Old English word árr or ármadr (Ar in old English). Which in Danish means the king's ombudsman or earl. Another explanation is that it comes from the man name Aar / Ar.

=== Aars stone ===
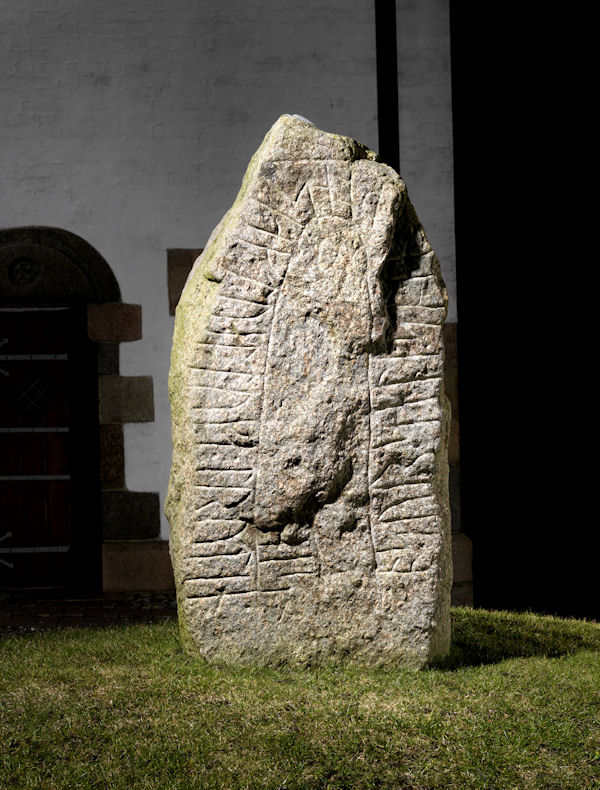
Aars stone

At the church in Aars there is a rune stone with the following inscription: (front) Asser put this stone after his lord Valtoke, (backside) The stone proclaims that it will stand here for a long time, it should mention Valtoke's varie. Valtoke full name was Valtoke Gormsson but he was also called Toke Gormsson, and he was son of Gorm the old (Danish: Gorm den gamle). He died in the Battle of Fýrisvellir and the stone was raised near Aars because he was Earl of Vendsyssel which is not too far from Aars, but how it ended up in Aars is not known. The rune stone was rediscovered in Aars in 1654. It is believed to have originally stood north-east of the church, probably as part of a memorial assemblage comparable to the Jelling stones.

=== Års Herred ===
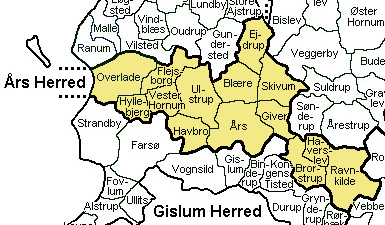
Års Herred marked yellow

A herred is a form of district or county. Års herred is known to have existed in 1345 and is believed to have come out of Hornum herred and Slet herred. From 1660, it was a part of Aalborghus Amt, but from 1970 to 2007, it was a part of Aalborg Amt until Aalborg Amt melted together with Hjørring Amt and created Nordjyllands Amt (English: North Jutland amt).

=== Railway town ===
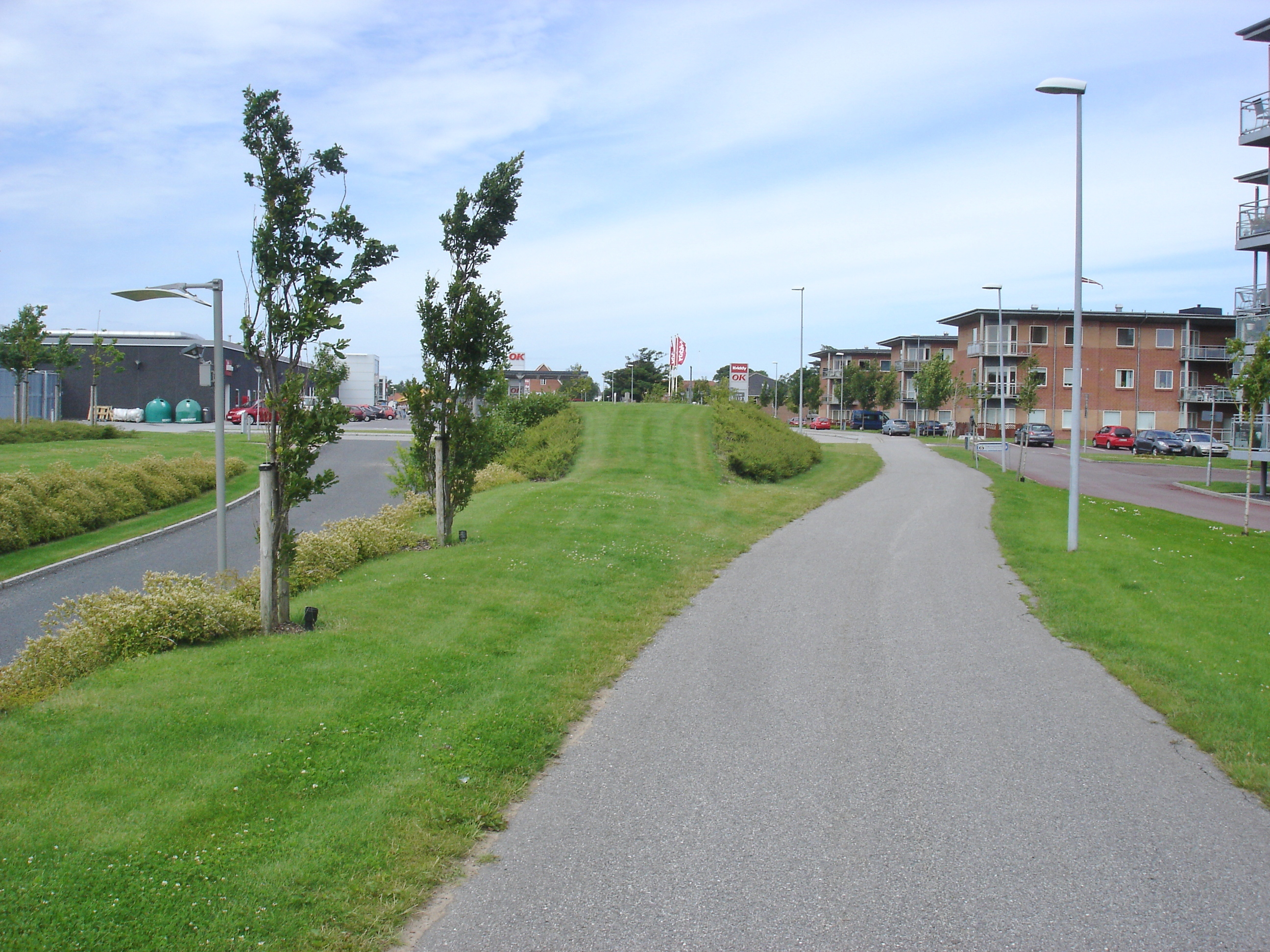
The decommissioned railway has now been repurposed as the pathway Himmerlandsstien

In 1875, there were 782 residents in Aars parish. In a description from around that time of the city is said "Aars with Church, Clergy house, School and Inn with Grocery Store, Bakery and Meltyard". In 1880 there was another grocery store. The end of the 18th century was there a post office.

In 1893, the city received a state railway station on the Himmerlandsbaner from Hobro / Viborg via Aalestrup to Løgstør. In 1899, Aars became Himmerland's railroad junction. The private railway Aars-Nibe-Svenstrup (-Aalborg) got a terminal here and was extended in 1910 from Aars to Hvalpsund. The Great Rail Act of 1918 even opened the possibility that there should also be a Himmelland crossroads Aars-Arden-Bælum-Øster Hurup, but this course was never brought, like most projects in this law.

Aalborg-Hvalpsund Railway was closed in 1969. As early as 1966, DSB's passenger traffic at Aars Station was terminated. The freight traffic Viborg-Løgstør continued with the expedition station in Aars, but ended in 1999. The station has been demolished, the track was taken up in 2006 and the former railway station is now shopstores. It will be used by the Himmerlands path to Viborg and Løgstør. Nature trail Nibe-Hvalpsund uses the railway line to Nibe, but follows Løgstørvej in the first 2 km towards Havbro.

=== Aars Municipality ===
Aars Municipality was formed by Kommunalreformen in 1970 which made the Parishes into municipalities and in the Aars municipality the town of Aars was the head city/capital/municipal seat of the municipality. The municipality covered an area of 223 km^{2} and had a total population of 13,284 in 2005. But in 2007, Aars Municipality ceased to exist and was merged with the former Farsø, Løgstør, and Aalestrup municipalities to form the new Vesthimmerland Municipality, with an area of 768.08 km^{2} (2013) and a total population of 38,277 (2008). The reason behind the merge was Kommunalreformen ("The Municipal Reform" of 2007) which merged many of the now former municipalities into bigger municipalities. Aars Municipality also had what is called a Municipality shield which was a Cimbrian bull (Danish:cimbrertyren) with a red background. The bull symbolized that the Cimbri were present in what was the area in Aars Municipality. Even though Aars Municipality is a thing of the past, the municipality shield can still be found around the city, for example in manhole covers and in the city entrance sign.

=== Excavation ===
The construction of a new bypass revealed 4000 year-old buildings. The archaeologists from Vesthimmerland Museum in Aars found a collection of houses they estimated to be around 4000 years old. However, there are only staggered tracks and other tracks, but overall, the findings show that the Aars area has been populated, and probably also densely populated for several thousands of years.

They have found traces of more houses. They assume that at least five of the houses are simultaneous. There is a trace of the plow type called an ard. Other things have also been found at the old houses. There have been found remains of an amber, ceramic cut, Flintafslags and two axes, a mountain axe and a single-grave axe.

== Buildings ==
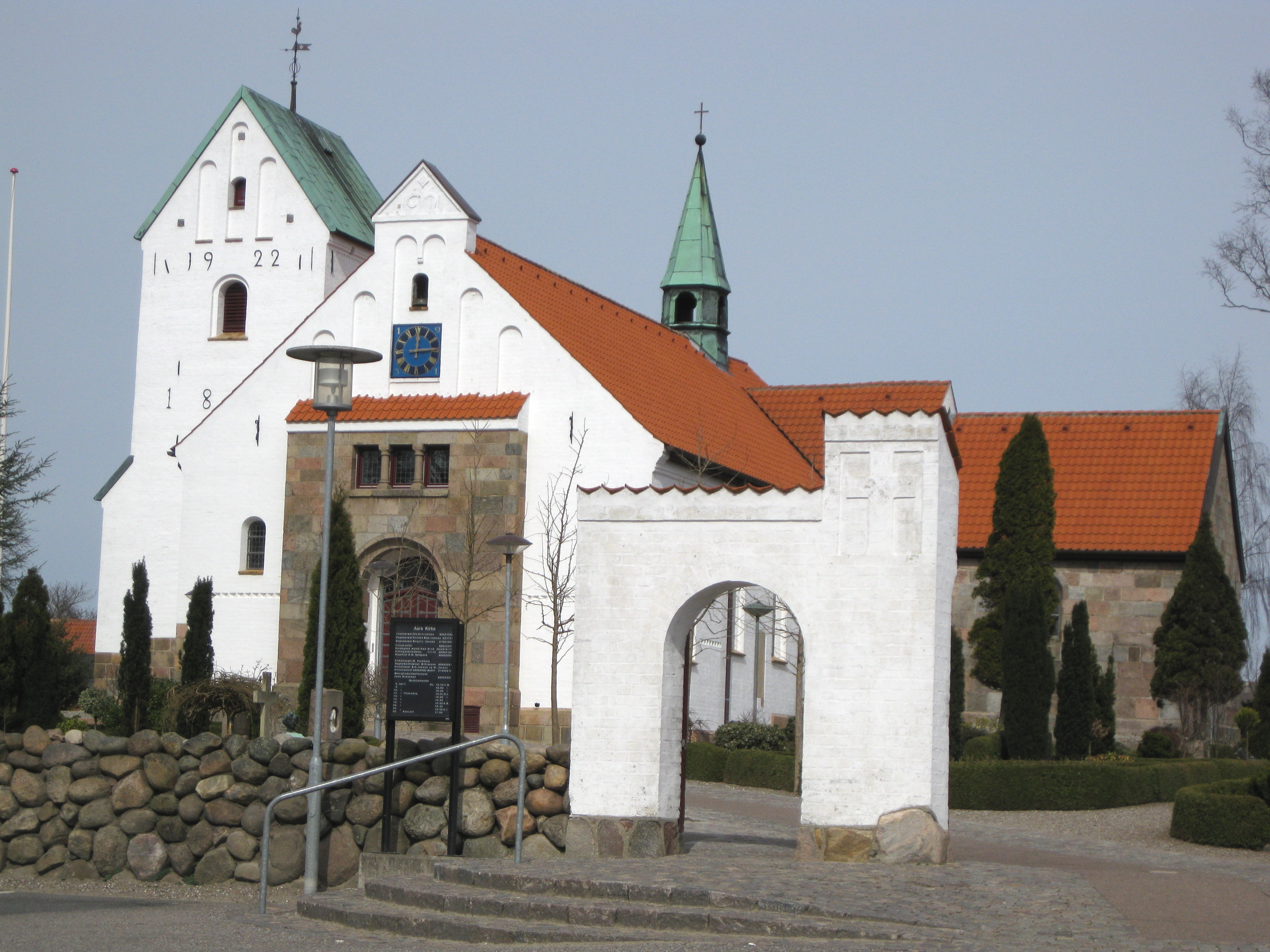
Aars Church

=== The church ===
Aars Church is a Lutheran church. It was the church of the medieval Aars parish. The original Romanesque building was extensively remodeled and was transformed into a cruciform church of considerable size in 1921. The oldest part is from around 1200. In 1937 Christian Andersen made the baptismal font.

=== The museum ===
Aars is renowned for the Vesthimmerlands Museum, with various exhibits on important regional cultural history and art. The museum was initiated in 1920 by Johannes V. Jensen, and eventually built in 1935. In 1999 the native artist Per Kirkeby and architect Jens Bertelsen designed the new extension buildings and the museum has some of Per Kirkeby's artwork on display.

=== Water tower ===
The tower is called Aars water tower since it is located in Aars. The tower is built in the middle of a water tank that housed the city's original water supply. The building features handicrafts. In the past, the tower had a neon logo on top showing the Cimbrian bull from Aars and the Aars Municipality coat of arms, but it was taken down. The tower previously contained a shop that sold yarn, tea cups, and other items before the shop relocated.

=== Aars Cinema ===
Aars Cinema is the local cinema and the only one in Aars. It is a union-driven cinema, where the tasks are mainly performed by volunteers. The cinema is located in Aars hovedgade (English: Main street). The building has a man on the front of the building and other part of the building is painted with persons, some of the people painted are from Olsen-banden and it the 3 main characters Egon, Benny and Kjeld. It has two halls to show films in. Every weekend there are children's movies on the program in the afternoon.

=== House of music ===
The Vesthimmerlands Musikhus ALFA began in 1995, when Per Kirkeby drew sketches for a house of music to be built in Aars.

As the economic conditions for such a project were not present at that time, the sketches were put away for a number of years, but in 2006, an opportunity emerged to realize the project. An EU grant of DKK 11.5 million became vacant, because the fiddle plug for the Aalborg House of Music Musikkens Hus project was waiting. In addition, the ALFA project received a grant of DKK 3.2 million from the EU. In 2008, Vesthimmerlands Musikhus ALFA (aka. Musikhuset) was finished, designed by architectural firm Kjær & Richter in collaboration with Per Kirkeby.

The ALFA House of Music comprise a concert hall with room for 420 guests and several teaching facilities. ALFA is an acronym for Aalestrup, Løgstør, Farsø and Aars, the four largest towns in the Vesthimmerland municipality, thus symbolizing the regional status of this cultural center.

== Education facilities ==
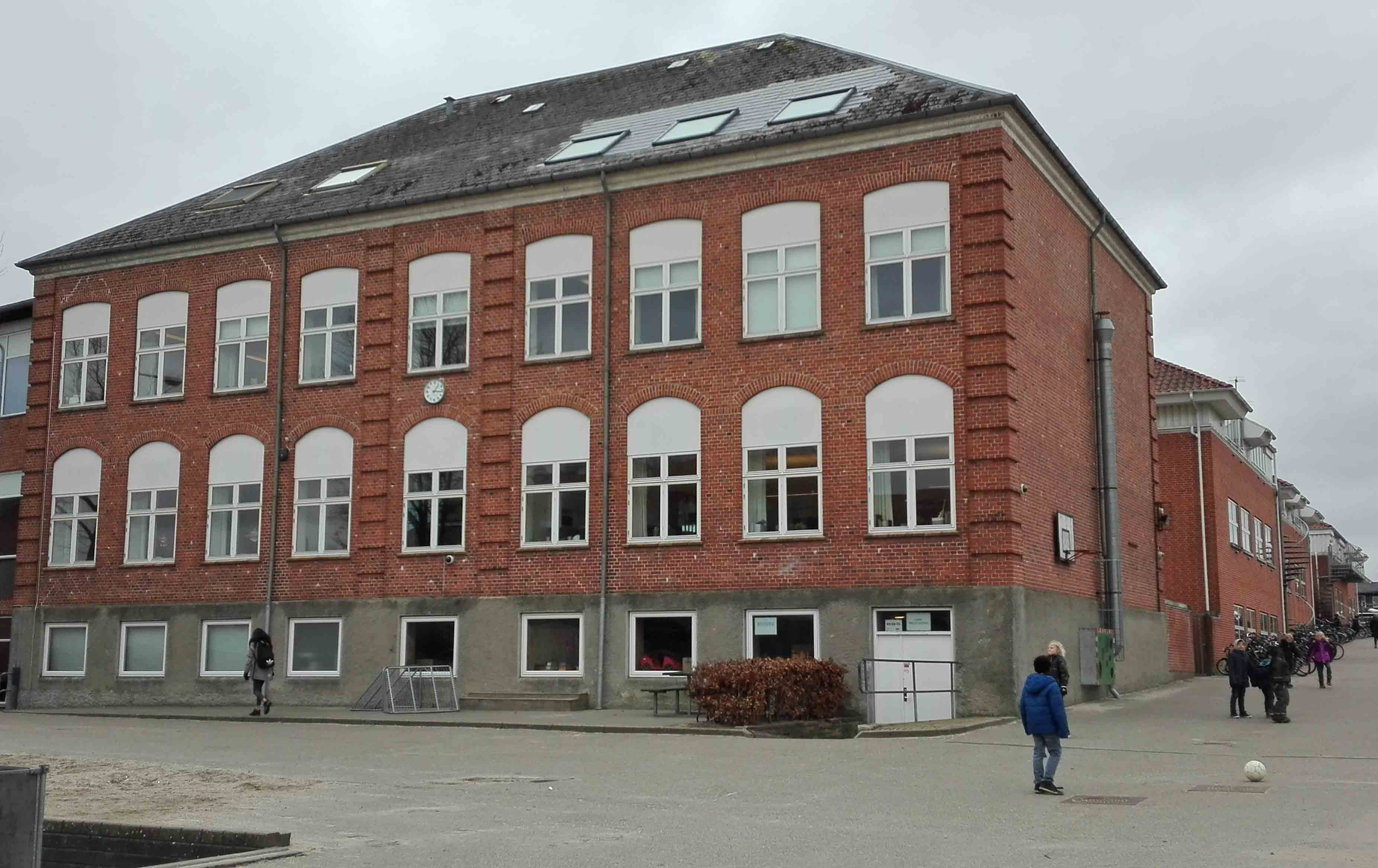
Aars School

=== Aars School ===
Aars skole or Aars school is one of two city schools located in Aars city. The school has 574 students divided into kindergarten class to 9th grade. The school has 57 teachers employed. The school also has a SFO. Aars school has a range of offers for children with special needs in relation to language and reading, learning or social contact with other children and adults.

=== Østermarkskolen ===
Østermarkskolen is one of two city schools located in Aars city. The school has 645 students divided into kindergarten class to 9th grade. There are 45 teachers employed, 3 kindergarten class leaders, 15 educators, 1 school inspector, 1 deputy school inspector, 1 SFO leader, 1 SFO deputy head, 2 secretaries, 1 service manager, 1 service employee (part-time), 1 person in 50-50 job order, 5 people in flexjob, 6 cleaning assistants. The school has a permanent psychologist associated with pedagogical psychological counseling. The school also has a healthcare provider attached. The school also has SFO that have the nickname vulkanen (English: The volcano). Because the SFO had a hill which looked like a volcano. The hill has since been kinda removed. Østermarkskolen har også en disc golf course that came in 2016 and it was the idea of two teachers from the school, it was Lars Kjølby who is a math, chemistry sport teacher and Christian Bunk Svane who is a sports and geography teacher.

=== Vestermarkskolen ===
Vestermarkskolen teaches Students with Autism, Down's Syndrome and Multi-Disabled. In addition, a large number of students are taught without proper diagnosis. The teaching is organized with focus on the individual student's needs and opportunities. The teaching is therefore arranged differently for the students. Vestermarkskolen was founded in 1966 in Aars. At that time it consisted of a number of pavilions on the corner of the school where the school now remains. Vestermarkskolen was founded as one of several schools around Denmark that was called: "de grønne skoler"(English: The green schools). The architect behind the schools was Erik Ejlers. He expressed himself Thus about the schools: "The purpose of this work is to achieve harmony with the area in which the school is to be placed. The urbanization means that these schools will lie in gardens - in the best sense of the word." Since 1966, major improvements have been made to the buildings and the areas around the buildings. They are proud of their frameworks and, they receive much recognition for those of daily users and guests. The school has a SFO.

== Events ==
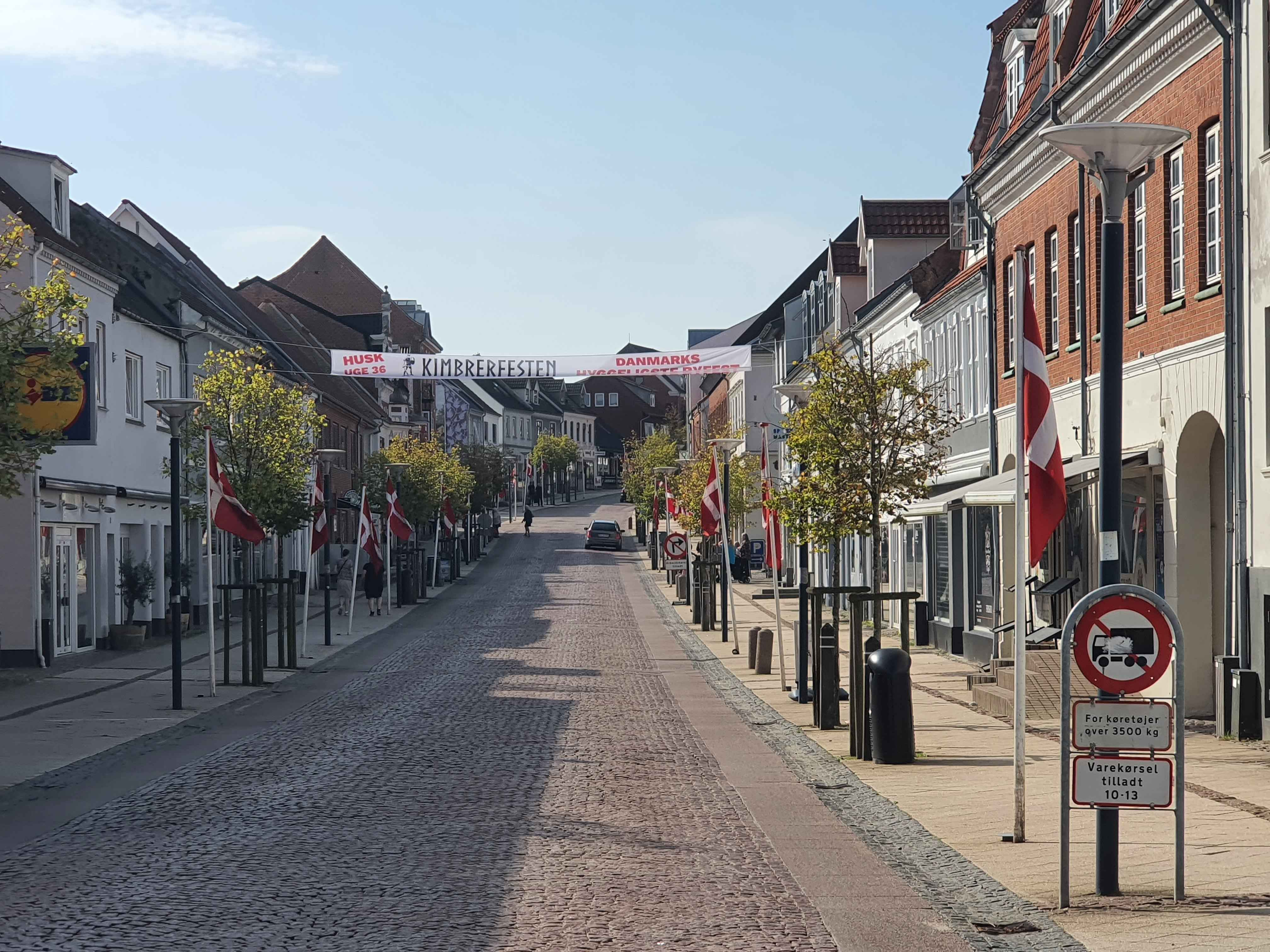
Aars during local festival called Kimbrerfesten in 2024.

Kimbrerfesten (Cimbri festival) is an annual festival in Aars since 1946. Until 2016, the festival was arranged in Anlægget (the facility), but changed location to the Messecenter (Exhibition center) building for a few years. Today it is back at Anlægget. The festival has many things to try and see like bumper car, Trout fishing at Skøjtesøen, Tour de Aars (cycling race) and in the evening there are live music in several tents. The Messecenter has many events throughout the year, including an agricultural show.

== Media ==
Aars has its own newspaper – Aars Avis (English: Aars newspaper). Aars Avis is the local newspaper of the region. Here, readers can follow what happens in Vesthimmerland via the editorial articles of the newspaper and ads from businesses, associations and private parties. Aars Avis was released for the first time in 1927.

== Mayors of Aars ==
=== Aars Municipality ===
Period	Name	Party
1970–1971	Holger Mikkelsen	Venstre
1971–1974	Niels Nystrup Haugård	Venstre
1974–1982	Alfred Rask	Venstre
1982–1986	Martin Glerup	Socialdemokratiet
1986–1990	Ejvind Nielsen	Venstre
1990–2002	Per Nørgaard	Venstre
2002–2007	Knud Vældgaard Kristensen	Det Konservative Folkeparti

=== Vesthimmerland Municipality ===
Period	Name	Party
2007–2009	Jens Lauritzen	Venstre
2010–2017	Knud Vældgaard Kristensen	Det Konservative Folkeparti
2017–present	Per Bach Laursen	Venstre

== Notable people ==
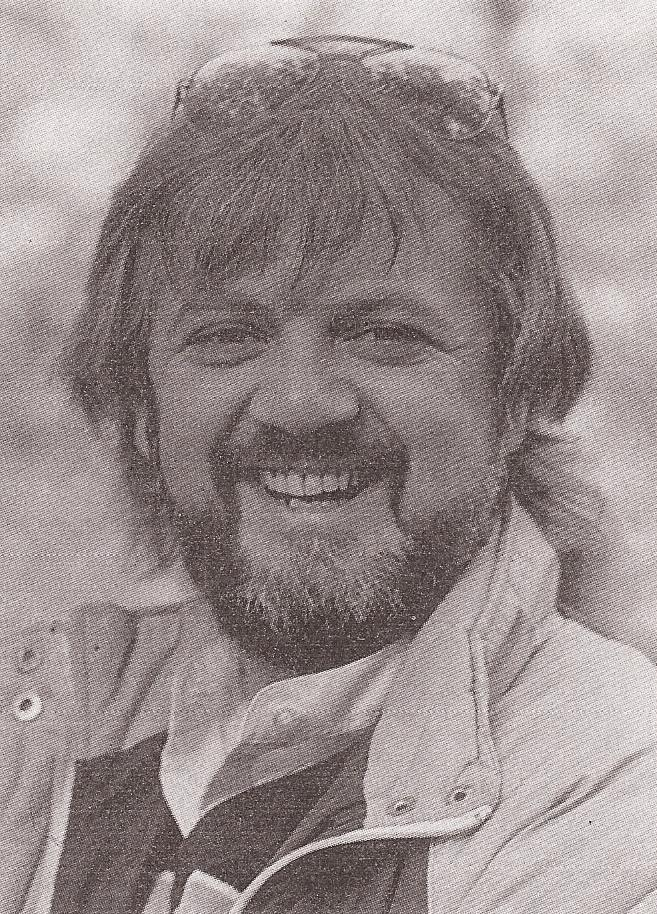
Per Pallesen, 2012

Notable people from Aars parish include:

- Søren Gyldendal (1742 in Aars – 1802) a Danish bookstore owner who founded Gyldendal.
- Christen Christian Larsen (1816 in Stenildvad - 1891) a cripple and vagabond with enormous strength.
- Børge Johannes Lauritsen (1916 in Aars – 1944) a merchant and member of the Danish resistance executed by the German occupying power.
- Jørgen Rydder (1923 in Aars – 1944) a merchant and member of the Danish resistance executed by the German occupying power.
- Per Pallesen (born 1942 in Aars), actor and theater director.
- Niels Holck (born 1961 in Aars) a Dane allegedly involved the Purulia arms drop case in India.

=== Sport ===
- Helle Simonsen (born 1976 in Aars) a Danish handball player.
- Caroline Rask (born 1994 in Aars) a Danish football midfielder, plays for Fortuna Hjørring.
- Andreas Højsleth (born 1995) a professional Counter-Strike: Global Offensive player, brought up in Aars.
- Victor Norlyk (born 2003), Danish professional handball player

== Twin towns and sister cities ==
- (Sweden) Skellefteå
- (Norway) Mo i Rana
- (Finland) Lapinlahti
- (Latvia) Sigulda

Former twin towns and sister cities

- (Sweden) Kopparberg (1945/46-2007)

== Gallery ==
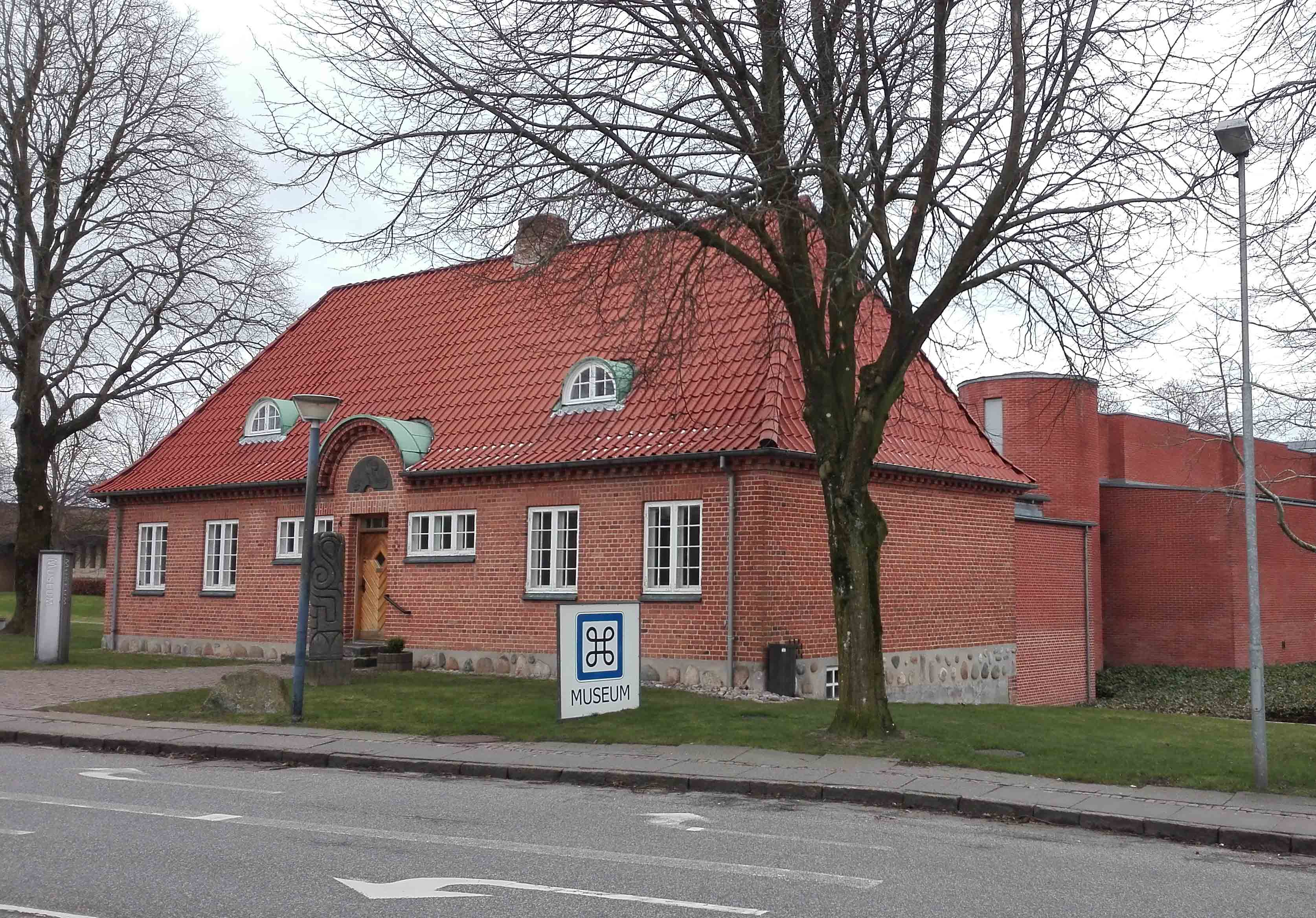
Aars Museum.

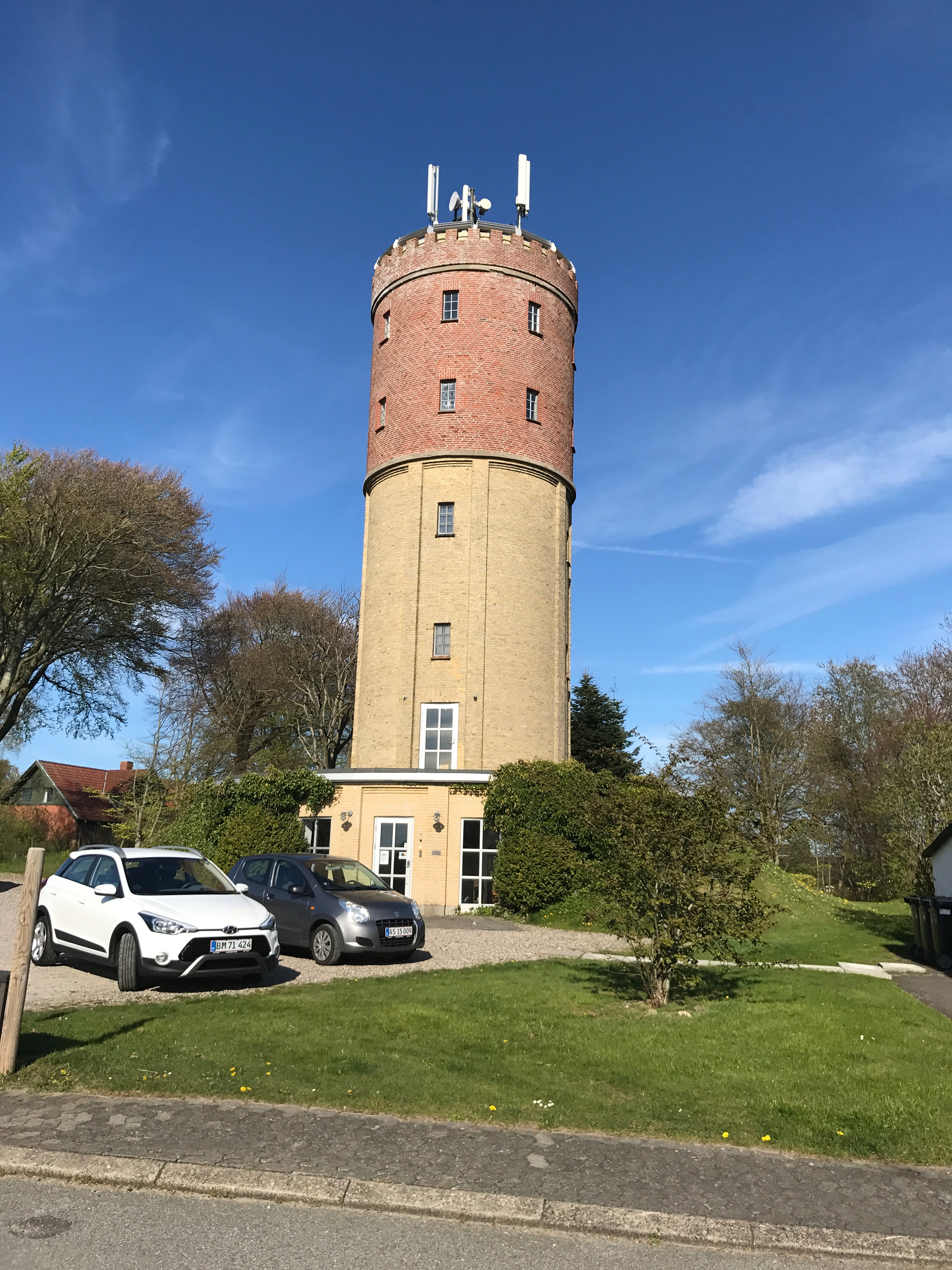
Aars water tower.

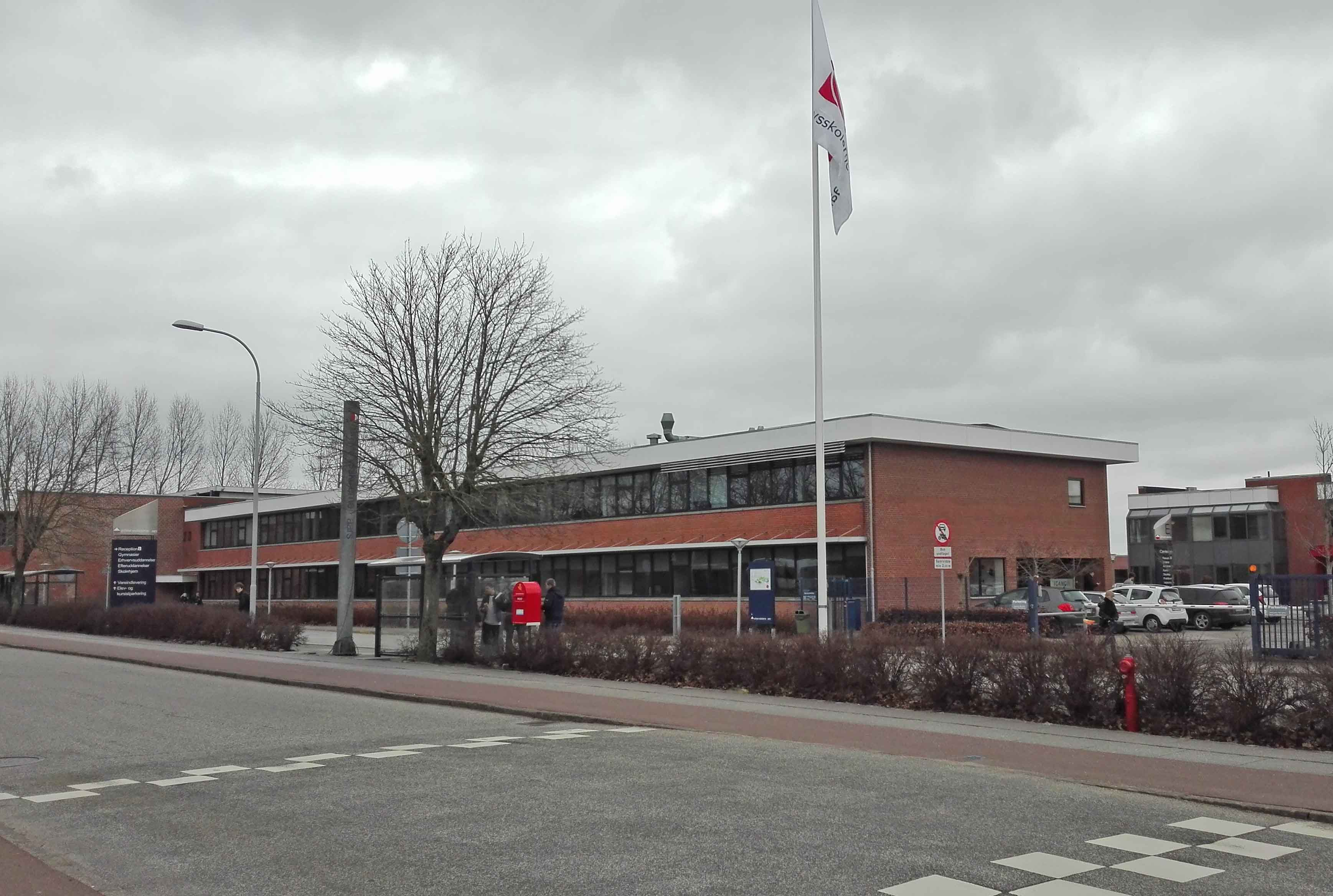
Aars's vocational school.

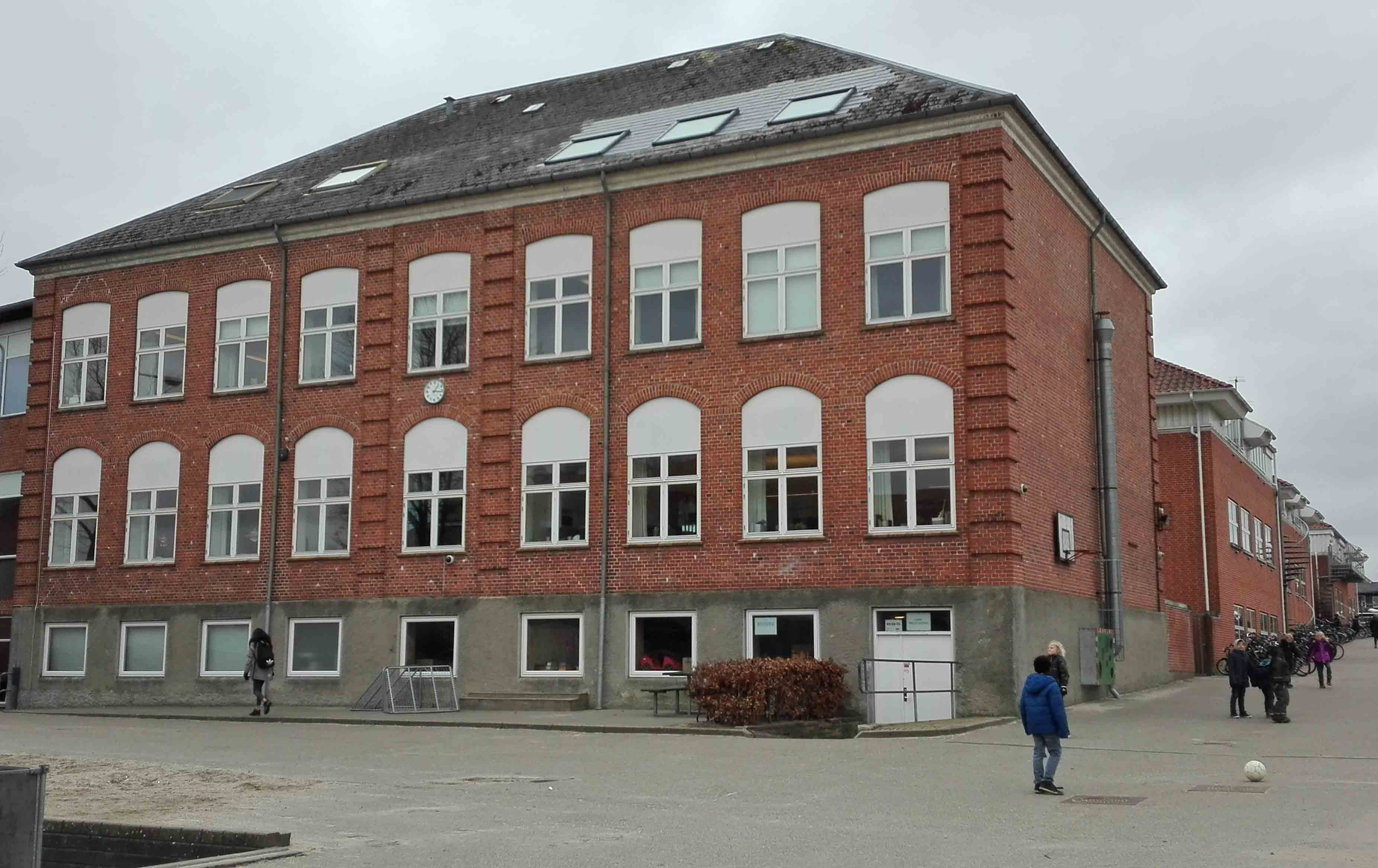
Aars school.

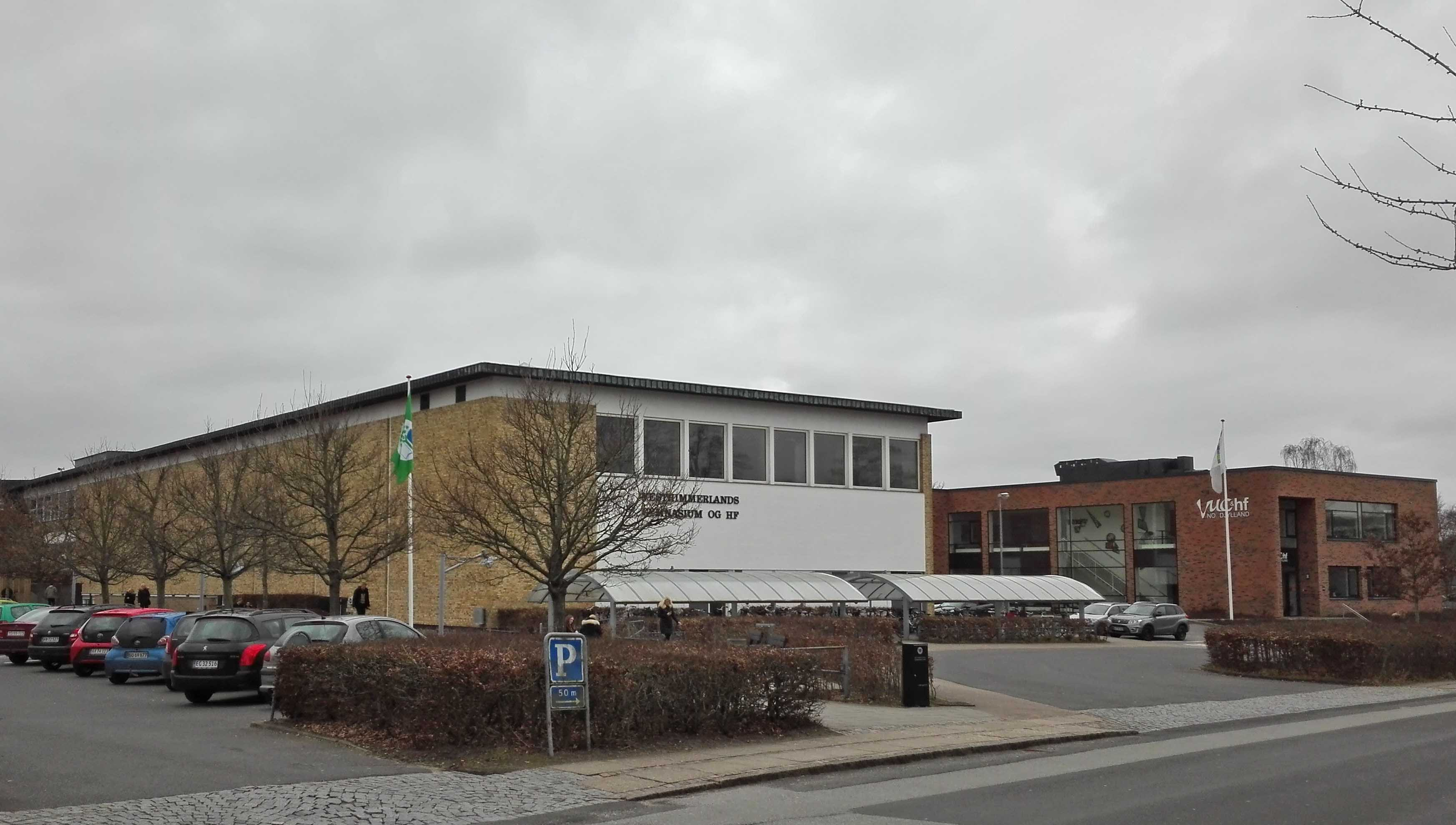
Vesthimmerlands Gymnasium.

== See also ==
- Farsø
- Løgstør
- Aalestrup
