= Broos =

Broos can have the following meanings:

- Orăștie, (German: Broos, Hungarian: Szászváros), city in south-western Transylvania, Romania
- Broos (film), a 1997 Dutch film
- Amber Broos (born 2002), Belgian DJ
- Harry Broos (1898–1954), Dutch sprinter
- Hugo Broos (born 1952), Belgian footballer

== See also ==
- Bros (disambiguation)
- Bruce (disambiguation)
