= Broe =

Broe is a surname. Notable people with the surname include:

- Camilla Broe, Danish citizen extradited to the US
- Carolyn Waters Broe, American conductor, composer and writer
- Carsten Broe (born 1963), Danish football team manager
- Ellen Broe (1900–1994), Danish nurse
- Georg Broe (1923–1998), Danish surrealist artist
- Irene Broe (1923–1992), Irish sculptor
- Tim Broe (born 1977), American long-distance runner

== See also ==
- Broe Township, Benson County, North Dakota
