= Tropospheric ozone depletion events =

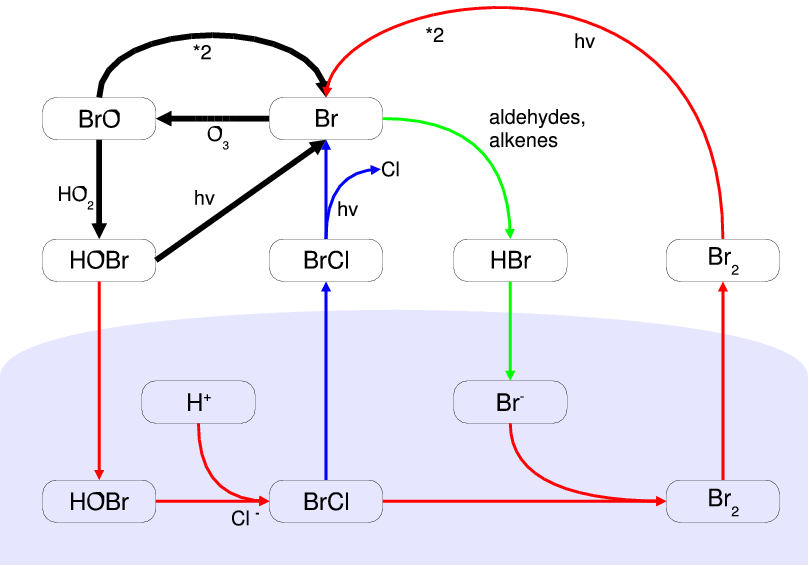
Chemical mechanism of the bromine explosion. The blue area at the bottom represents the condensed phase (liquid brine or ice surface).

Tropospheric ozone depletion events are phenomena that reduce the concentration of ozone in the Earth's lower atmosphere. Ozone (O_{3}) is a trace gas which has been of concern because of its unique dual role in different layers of the atmosphere. Apart from absorbing UV-B radiation and converting solar energy into heat in the stratosphere, ozone in the troposphere provides greenhouse effect and controls the oxidation capacity of the atmosphere.

== Sources of tropospheric ozone ==
Ozone in the troposhere is determined by photochemical production and destruction, dry deposition and cross-tropopause transport of ozone from the stratosphere. In the Arctic troposphere, transport and photochemical reactions involving nitrogen oxides and volatile organic compounds (VOCs) as a result of human emissions also produce ozone resulting in a background mixing ratio of 30 to 50 nmol mol−1 (ppb). Nitrogen oxides play a key role in recycling active free radicals (such as reactive halogens) in the atmosphere and indirectly affect ozone depletion. Ozone depletion events (ODEs) are phenomena associated with the sea ice zone. They are routinely observed at coastal locations when incoming winds have traversed sea ice covered areas.

== Halogen activation ==
During springtime in the polar regions of Earth, unique photochemistry converts inert halide salt ions (e.g. Br^{−}) into reactive halogen species (e.g. Br atoms and BrO) that episodically deplete ozone in the atmospheric boundary layer to near zero levels. These processes are favored by light and low temperature conditions. Since their discovery in the late 1980s, research on these ozone depletion events has shown the central role of bromine photochemistry. The exact sources and mechanisms that release bromine are still not fully understood, but the combination of concentrated sea salt in a condensed phase substrate appears to be a pre-requisite. Shallow boundary layers are also likely to be beneficial since they enhance the speed of autocatalytic bromine release by confining the released bromine to a smaller space. Under these conditions, and with sufficient acidity, gaseous hypobromous acid (HOBr) can react with condensed sea salt bromide and produce bromine that is then released to the atmosphere. Subsequent photolysis of this bromine generates bromine radicals that can react with and destroy ozone. Due to the autocatalytic nature of the reaction mechanism, it has been called bromine explosion.

== Chemical destruction ==
It is still not fully understood how salts are transported from the ocean and oxidized to become reactive halogen species in the air. Other halogens (chlorine and iodine) are also activated through mechanisms coupled to bromine chemistry. The main consequence of halogen activation is chemical destruction of ozone, which removes the primary precursor of atmospheric oxidation, and generation of reactive halogen atoms/oxides that become the primary oxidizing species. The oxidation ability originally influenced by ozone is weakened, while the halogen species now holds the oxidation ability. This changes the reaction cycles and final products of many atmospheric reactions. During ozone depletion events, the enhanced halogen chemistry can effectively oxidize reactive gaseous elements.

== Effects ==
The different reactivity of halogens as compared to OH and ozone has broad impacts on atmospheric chemistry. These include near complete removal and deposition of mercury, alteration of oxidation fates for organic gases, and export of bromine into the free troposphere. The deposition of reactive gaseous mercury (RGM) in snow from oxidation by enhanced halogens increases the bioavailability of mercury. Recent changes in the climate of the Arctic and state of the Arctic sea ice cover are likely to have strong effects on halogen activation and ozone depletion events. Human-induced climate change affects the quantity of snow and ice cover in the Arctic, altering the intensity of nitrogen oxide emissions. Increment in background levels of nitrogen oxide apparently strengthens the consumption of ozone and the enhancement of halogens.

== See also ==
- Arctic haze
- Free radical halogenation
- Tropospheric ozone
- Frost flower (sea ice)
