= Frost flower (sea ice) =

Ice crystal found growing on young sea ice

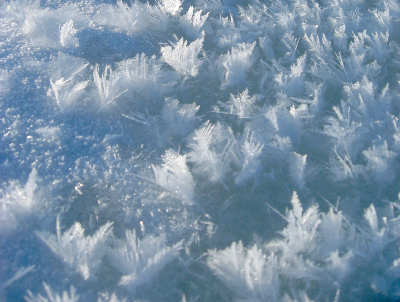
Frost flowers growing on young sea ice in the Arctic

Frost flowers are ice crystals commonly found growing on young sea ice and thin lake ice in cold, calm conditions. The ice crystals are similar to hoar frost, and are commonly seen to grow in patches around 3–4 cm in diameter. Frost flowers growing on sea ice have extremely high salinities and concentrations of other sea water chemicals and, because of their high surface area, are efficient releasers of these chemicals into the atmosphere.

== Formation ==
Frost flowers form when a layer of relatively warm ice is exposed to still, cold air that is at least 15 °C colder. For example, this would occur when freshly-formed ice at 0 °C underlies cold air at -30 °C. In this situation, water vapor sublimates from the surface of the ‘warm’ ice. As this moist air rises into the colder overlying air, the temperature drops, and the air becomes supersaturated. The final result is a layer of supersaturated air, lying directly above the ice (just like how steam forms above the surface of a hot mug of water on a cold day). Any protrusions from the ice surface stick up into the supersaturated air, and end up being covered in hoar-frost like crystals (i.e. frost flowers) due to condensation. This only occurs when there is little wind: in high winds the supersaturated layer is scrubbed from the surface and blowing snow obscures the ice surface.

Typically, frost flowers are only found on new ice, when the air temperature is very low. This is because thin, new ice has a temperature close that of the underlying, warm water. As ice thickens, its surface becomes much colder, and it is harder to get the necessary ice/air temperature difference needed for frost flower growth. Over fresh water, these conditions are only found when the air temperature drops dramatically below zero in a short amount of time, leading to a sudden freezing event. Thus, fresh-water frost flowers are relatively rare. By contrast, salt-water frost flowers are more common -- especially in cold, polar regions. Sea ice is often broken apart by winds, tides and currents, leading to open water ‘leads’ that are exposed to extremely cold air temperatures. When these leads freeze over, forming thin ice, frost flowers often form in dense concentrations.

Frost flowers on sea ice are extremely saline. When sea water freezes, it forms porous ice that consists of mostly fresh-water ice, run through with brine channels filled with very briny water (containing the salt rejected from the ice during the freezing process). These brine channels extend to the ice surface and coat it with a wet, highly saline surface (‘a surface skim’). This is then wicked up onto frost flowers, increasing their salinity. The tips of mature frost flowers are less saline due to vapor deposition and the bulk salinity decreases at night due to hoarfrost accumulation as the temperature drops and new snow (they are very good at collecting snow) which also reduces their bulk salinity over time. Studies have been done on frost flowers and in one study in the ocean near Barrow, Alaska Alvarez-Aviles et al. (2008) found that the bulk salinities of the frost flowers ranged from 16 ppt to 105 ppt with an average of about 62 ppt. (approximately three times more salty than sea water).

== Morphology ==
Temperature, specifically the temperature at the surface of the ice that is not in the vicinity of the frost flowers, has a direct impact on the morphology as well as the thickness and absorbency of the ice, snow coverage and the blanket of frost flowers. The shape of frost flowers changes when the air temperature or the degree of supersaturation changes during the growth process by changing the crystal tips. The level of supersaturation determines the general formation, size and shape of the frost flower. In lower supersaturation, the tip of the frost flower will be faceted and side branches will form creating a branched-like crystal, resembling a tree, where in higher supersaturation the tip shape of the main branch will be rounded forming a star-like crystal without side branches. The ice crystals in frost flowers are usually dendritic but similarly to hoar frost can grow in rod-like morphologies. When warm brine is wicked up onto the ice crystals, it can also give the frost flower a 'clumped' appearance as the facets of the ice crystals are partly melted.

== Chemistry ==
Frost flowers are complex in microstructural chemistry due to many different conditions, like air, temperature, chemical concentrations in the water, surface skim, humidity, and precipitation influencing their formation and growth. An important part of their formation is the fractionation of sodium and sulfate in respects to chloride during precipitation of the salts. When the temperature decreases brine rejection increases and the channels become more and more concentrated, especially at the surface. When the salts begin the precipitate out of the ice, it changes the relative ion concentrations available in liquid water and in the frost flowers. Temperatures below -8 °C there is an increase loss of sodium and sulfate in relation to a decreasing temperature resulting in a depletion of aerosol from frost flowers at such temperatures in contrast to other ions. Frost flowers aerosol will have a higher sodium to sulfate ratio in comparison to aerosol from seawater because sulfate has a greater proportion being removed than sodium when mirabilite (Na_{2}SO_{4} · 10H_{2}O) precipitates. Frost flowers have a high concentration, typically 2 to 3 times greater, of bromide ions than found in seawater which is proportional to the salinity in the frost flowers. If the temperature were low enough for the sodium chloride that is present in the brine or frost flowers to freeze out, then the bromide may become readily available. Ice surface temperatures below -22 °C start to precipitate out sodium chloride and even lower temperatures other ions will precipitate out, but with surface ice temperature that low frost flowers cannot form, so it is unlikely that there will be depleted sodium chloride.

== Aerosol release ==
Frost flowers have attracted interest as a possible source of polar atmospheric aerosol. High chemical concentrations and the extended surface area may facilitate efficient release into the atmosphere. In particular studies have shown that abundance of frost flowers can be linked to high concentrations of tropospheric bromine monoxide causing tropospheric ozone depletion events, and higher quantities of airborne sea-salt particles. The study Obbard et al. (2009) addressing the concern of bromine, which may be causing the ozone depletion, showed no conclusive evidence that the frost flower aerosol is causing a significant contribution of bromine enrichment into the atmosphere. Furthermore, the study showed that there was bromine depletion as well as enrichment relative to chloride in frost flowers.

== See also ==
- Frost
