= Scott W. Rothstein =

American lawyer (born 1962)

- Born: June 10, 1962 (age 64); The Bronx, New York, U.S.
- Education: University of Florida (BA); Nova Southeastern University (JD)
- Occupation: Attorney (disbarred)
- Status: Witness Protection Program, incarcerated
- Conviction: January 27, 2010 (pleaded guilty)
- Criminal charges: Racketeering, fraud, conspiracy
- Penalty: 50 years in federal prison

Scott W. Rothstein (born June 10, 1962) is an American former lawyer, convicted felon, and the former managing shareholder, chairman, and chief executive officer of the now-defunct Rothstein Rosenfeldt Adler law firm. He funded an extravagant lifestyle with a $1.2 billion Ponzi scheme, one of the largest in American history.

== Early life ==
Rothstein was born in The Bronx, New York, to Gay Boockvor Rothstein and Harvey Rothstein (1935–2012), who was a door-to-door salesman. He had one sibling, a younger sister. He attended classes for intellectually gifted children in elementary school, and Special Progress classes in junior high school. He joined the Boy Scouts and, from the age of eight, attended Hebrew school. At the age of 12, he began studying for his Bar mitzvah at Temple Judea. Here, it was discovered that he had an exceptional tenor voice and he joined the choir. Two years later, the family moved to Lauderhill, Florida, where Rothstein attended Boyd H. Anderson High School and sang in the school's choir, chamber choir and barbershop quartet. He also played guitar and began to write songs, however when it came time to choose a career, he chose law over music. In 1984, he obtained a Bachelor of Arts degree from the University of Florida; in 1988, he graduated as a Juris Doctor from Nova Southeastern University's Shepard Broad College of Law.

== Career ==
Rothstein partnered with attorney Howard Kusnick to form Kusnick & Rothstein, first in Plantation, Florida and then in Fort Lauderdale. At the time, Rothstein specialized in labor and employment litigation. In 1999, Rothstein joined with Stuart Rosenfeldt as a name partner at the Hollywood, Florida firm, Phillips Eisinger Koss & Rosenfeldt, which became known as Phillips Eisinger Koss Rothstein & Rosenfeldt. In 2001, Rothstein and Rosenfeldt left to start their own firm, Rothstein & Rosenfeldt. The firm soon included lawyer Russell Adler, when it became known as Rothstein, Rosenfeldt & Adler, or 'RRA'.

Over the next seven years, the firm grew to 70 lawyers and 150 employees, with offices in Boca Raton, West Palm Beach, Fort Lauderdale, Miami, Tallahassee, New York City and Caracas. The firm focused on labor and employment matters, civil rights, intellectual property, internet law, corporate espionage, personal injury, wrongful death, commercial litigation, real estate, mergers and acquisitions, and governmental relations, with a client list that included Citicorp, J. C. Penney, National Beverage, Silversea Cruises and Wells Fargo.

In August 2008, Florida Governor Charlie Crist appointed Rothstein as a member of the Florida's Fourth District Court of Appeal's Judicial nominating commission, a body which is responsible for selecting new judges for appointment to the Court.

Rothstein was a member of the Florida Bar and admitted by the United States Supreme Court. He had earned an AV Preeminent rating, the highest peer review rating awarded by the legal profession's information services company Martindale-Hubbell. The rating is a testament to an attorney's skill, communication, and integrity; fewer than 5% of lawyers achieve this distinction.

On November 17, 2009, the Florida Bar Executive Committee accepted Rothstein's request to be disbarred. The Florida Supreme Court entered the order on November 25, 2009. Rothstein was removed from the Broward County Grievance Committee, and his name was removed from the database of "The Best Lawyers in America".

== Ponzi scheme ==
In the mid-2000s, Rothstein entered into a business arrangement with two Fort Lauderdale men: George G. Levin and Frank J. Preve. Levin established a company called Banyan Income Fund, the sole purpose of which was to deal with Rothstein's 'settlement' business. In this complicated scheme, Rothstein sold victim investors 'discounted confidential settlement agreements'. Rothstein represented these as agreements entered into between plaintiffs and defendants in settlement of various legal claims, and told investors that their monies would be used to pay the plaintiffs a discounted percentage of the settlement award immediately, in exchange for the victim investors’ rights to receive the entirety of the settlement award over time. Investors were sworn to secrecy, and were guaranteed a minimum of 20% return on their investment, in as little as three months.

In 2007, Levin and Preve began raising money to purchase Rothstein's settlements by offering investors short-term promissory notes issued by Banyan. In 2012, the United States Securities and Exchange Commission charged Levin and Preve, asserting that they provided the biggest influx of investor funds into Rothstein's scheme, i.e. $157 million from 173 investors in less than two years.

Prosecutors alleged that Rothstein ran the scheme from his Fort Lauderdale office, and that his victims included his friends and clients. It was also alleged that he used the services of corrupt law enforcement officials, forged federal court documents, forged judges' signatures, and convinced others to pose as judges, to make the settlements look legitimate.

=== Swindle pitch ===
Lawyer David Boden, who would serve 18 months for his part in the scheme, was present for some of the swindle pitches, and negotiated the final papers with the investors' lawyers. He stated that Rothstein would tell investors that RRA was the preeminent sexual harassment law firm in the country and said that he'd figured out a basic formula through which, for example, someone with a net worth of $10 million was willing to pay $2 million in cash to pay off their mistress. The key was the promise of confidentiality. Rothstein said that he would meet potential defendants and question them about affairs they had with any employees. The defendants would deny any such affairs. He would point to a piece of artwork on the wall, say that there was a television screen behind it, and tell the investor that he would show the defendant a video of him having sex with his mistress. He said that he would say to the defendant "We can either settle this now, or I can depose your wife, your mistress, you and your son about it." Since defendants often couldn't or wouldn't pay the entire settlement up-front, Rothstein told investors that his first harassment case involved a $3.5 million settlement and a million-dollar legal fee. Rothstein said that he assigned the settlement to a friend and the plaintiff settled for $3 million without going to trial. The friend was paid $3.5 million, resulting in a profit of $500,000.00 for the firm and its investors.

Rothstein also told potential investors that they could buy whistle-blower settlements with a 60% short-term investor profit. The arrangement would be completely secret; the investor would never know the name of the company or the whistle-blower. The settlement money would be deposited into a trust account at TD Bank, accessible only to the investor at the appropriate time. Boden would answer all questions and negotiate the contracts.

Although these concepts were extortionary and clearly not legitimate, the approach made sense to potential investors, whose consideration was that, with enough of these cases, Rothstein's firm could make huge sums of money and their own profits would be significant.

==== Partners' income strategy and Rothstein's returns ====
The allegations were that George Levin ("GP") solicited each limited partner ("LP") to contribute at least $1 million. Initially, each LP contributed $250,000, subject to periodic capital calls up to the amount of their commitments. They were promised 12% annually (15% for first $100 million), to be paid quarterly. The general partner had to maintain a balance of not less than 10% of all contributions after any quarterly distributions. The general partner also gave a "clawback" guaranty to all LPs equal to their original contributions. LPs could not request redemptions during an initial one-year "lock-up" period and were required to give 90 days' notice for any withdrawals. Redemptions would be paid from GP's own capital account "to the extent available" with a 10% hold-back, but otherwise, only from the purchased lawsuits settlement stream. The LPs were warned that they could be taxed on the Partnership's income and realized gains even if no distributions were made. As long as reinvestments were ongoing, the ponzi scheme was facilitated.

Banyon paid Rothstein's firm at least $656 million, but the law firm anticipated $1.1 billion over a maximum 24-month period. It allegedly received and reinvested about $500 million. Levin expected to make 40% over 24 months but to only pay out 24%. Rothstein's law firm's IOLTA trust accounts, established "for the plaintiff" in the purported litigation settlements, were used to fund the phony settlement accounts. However, after the firm had paid its overhead, which included "gifts" to partners and money given to politicians, charities, and had paid for a massive advertising budget, as well as for Rothstein's personal lifestyle, there was a loss over three years of approximately $500 million.

The Great Recession of 2007–2009 saw a decrease in new investors and the scheme began running out of funds to pay existing investors. Rothstein initially staved off scrutiny by claiming that he was experiencing temporary issues with the Florida Bar, and convinced others to raise an additional $100 million. By early 2009, Rothstein had ceased making payments to investors.

Further to Rothstein's cooperation, approximately 30 people were convicted and jailed as a result of their participation in the scheme, and many more were implicated. In addition to Rothstein, Adler and Rosenfeldt were Rothstein's former partner Howard Kusnick, Rothstein's uncle William Boockvor, his financial advisor Michael Szafranski, his administrative assistant Denise Feiss, RRA's Chief Operating Officer Debra Villegas, RRA's Chief Finanical Officer Irene Stay, the firm Berenfeld Spritzer Shechter Sheer, which audited the Banyan Income Fund and, in particular, the TD Bank (United States). In 2015, Frank Spinosa, a TD Bank Regional Vice President, pled guilty to conspiracy to commit wire fraud and was sentenced to 30 months in prison.

=== Resolution ===
By 2014, TD Bank had paid hundreds of millions of dollars to investors that sued the bank, and all of Rothstein's investors were made whole, with some making a profit.

=== Bankruptcy and creditor recovery ===
Following Rothstein's arrest and guilty plea, his law firm Rothstein Rosenfeldt Adler, P.A. was placed into Chapter 11 bankruptcy in the Southern District of Florida (Case No. 09-34791), with Herbert Stettin appointed as the bankruptcy trustee. The involuntary petition was filed by defrauded investors represented by Genovese Joblove & Battista. The Official Committee of Creditors was represented by Akerman LLP and Kelley Kronenberg, while the debtor's estate was managed by lead counsel Jordi Guso of Berger Singerman. The proceedings generated hundreds of clawback actions against investors who had received payments from the scheme, with various South Florida firms representing affected creditor groups, including Stroock & Lavan LLP, Sonn & Associates, and the Law Office of Mark S. Roher, P.A. The case remained active for over a decade before its termination in January 2021.

== Prosecution and sentencing ==
How authorities came to know of Rothstein's activities is unclear. On November 3, 2009, Federal Bureau of Investigation and Internal Revenue Service (IRS) agents raided RRA's offices.

Prior to the raid, Rothstein sent inquiries to other lawyers asking which countries refused to extradite criminal suspects to either the U.S. or Israel. Some lawyers responded that Morocco is one such country. Rothstein wired $16 million to an individual in Casablanca and left for Casablanca on October 26, 2009. On October 31, 2009, he texted a suicide note to all of his law partners, writing "Sorry for letting you all down. I am a fool. I thought I could fix it, but got trapped by my ego and refusal to fail, and now all I have accomplished is hurting the people I love. Please take care of yourselves and please protect Kimmie [Rothstein's wife]. She knew nothing. Neither did she, nor any of you deserve what I did. I hope God allows me to see you on the other side. Love, Scott."

On November 3, 2009, after many texts from Rosenfeldt urging him to "choose life", Rothstein returned to Fort Lauderdale from Casablanca, on a chartered jet. (Rothstein was a large contributor to the Las Olas Chabad Jewish Center, which at the time had the following affixed to its facade: 'The Rothstein Family Downtown Jewish Center Chabad'. Rabbi Schneur Kaplan is one of the people who talked Rothstein out of committing suicide.)

On November 3, 2009, with $117,000 in its operating account, Rothstein's firm filed suit against him, accusing him of misappropriating hundreds of millions of dollars from investor trust accounts, and asked a judge to dissolve the firm. A retired judge was assigned to act as receiver and untangle the firm's finances.

On December 1, 2009, Rothstein turned himself in and was arrested on charges under the Racketeer Influenced and Corrupt Organizations Act (RICO). Although his arraignment plea was 'not guilty', Rothstein reversed his plea to 'guilty' of five federal crimes on January 27, 2010. He was denied bond by U.S. Magistrate Judge Robin S. Rosenbaum, who ruled that due to his alleged ability to forge documents, he was considered a flight risk. Rothstein initially resided at the Federal Detention Center, Miami, but, further to his plea agreement, was moved to an undisclosed location. His inmate number was removed from the Federal Bureau of Prisons inmate locator webpage and he was placed in the Witness Protection Program.

On June 9, 2010, at a hearing in federal court in Fort Lauderdale, Rothstein received a 50-year prison sentence.

On June 8, 2011, and further to the plea agreement, prosecutors filed a Motion for Reduction of Sentence and Stay of Ruling, stating that Rothstein's cooperation had begun before his sentencing and would continue. However, when it came to light that Rothstein had provided "false material information" in violation of his plea agreement, the motion was withdrawn.

On September 8, 2011, U.S. District Judge James I. Cohn granted the government's motion to prohibit the videotaping of Rothstein's scheduled depositions, citing "serious harm" and "security reasons that are unusual in nature." The exact reasons for the judge's decision were sealed.

In December 2011, Rothstein sat for 12 days of court-ordered depositions conducted by lawyers representing various clients that had filed suit against him.

In 2018, Rothstein challenged his sentence, stating that prosecutors had reneged on their promise to lower his sentence in exchange for his cooperation. His challenge was rejected. As of 2025, his location, and the identity under which he is imprisoned, are unknown.

== Lifestyle ==
Rothstein led an extravagant lifestyle, and he was extremely concerned with security. Anyone entering his suite of offices had to use an intercom. He could exit, unseen, through a second door. There was a hidden elevator, and dozens of surveillance cameras and microphones hung from office ceilings. His security team was off-duty Fort Lauderdale police officers, who guarded his home, his restaurant and the firm; there were so many security offers that two police officials were required to coordinate it. His security detail included many high-ranking supervisors; two coordinators, Sgt. Steve Greenlaw and Officer DeAnna Garcia, were paid a 5.5% cut of the security-guarding total each week.

Rothstein owned a Boeing 727 jet and a watch collection of over one hundred pieces. He owned an 87-foot yacht. His fleet of cars included four Ferraris, a Bentley, a Silver Rolls-Royce, three Lamborghini Murcielagos, two $1.6 million Bugattis, and two Harley-Davidson motorcycles, all of which he stored in an air-conditioned warehouse.

== Real estate and business investments ==
In 2003, Rothstein paid $1.2 million for a waterfront house on Castilla Isle in Fort Lauderdale. In March 2005, he bought a neighboring home belonging to Miami Dolphins' Ricky Williams for $2.73 million. While living in Williams' old house, he purchased two other homes on the street and three other homes in Broward County.

He owned a $2.8 million oceanfront estate in Narragansett, Rhode Island, and a $6 million condo in New York. His principal residence was a waterfront house in Fort Lauderdale's Harbor Beach neighbourhood, for which he paid $6.5 million in 2008; it was sold for $5.1 million in 2014. He also owned the Bova Prime restaurant in Fort Lauderdale, which closed in 2010.

Rothstein's wife, Kimberly Wendell Rothstein, who was a bartender turned real-estate agent, managed his properties, which also included part of an office building in Pompano Beach, and a share of Casa Casuarina, the former estate of Gianni Versace.

Rothstein owned part of the technology company Qtask, and of V Georgio Spirits Co., and of the Renato watch company. He was a minority shareholder of Edify LLC, a health-care benefits consulting company.

In 2008, Rothstein was working on opening a cigar and martini bar on Las Olas Boulevard and two high-rise residential buildings in Brooklyn with New York partner Domenick Tonacchio. He was also to take ownership of a "series of office buildings" on Broward County's Oakland Park Boulevard.

Right-wing political consultant Roger Stone was a partner with Rothstein in RRA Consulting, which was set up to provide public affairs assistance to the RRA law firm's clients. According to Stone, the business never generated any clients and was dissolved in late 2008. Until July 29, 2009, Rothstein was the sponsor of Stone's blog, "StoneZone". On August 27, 2009, Stone wrote a column recommending Rothstein for the seat vacated by Senator Mel Martinez, writing that Rothstein was "a man with a distinguished legal record, has been a key supporter of Governor Charlie Crist and Senator John McCain, has an unmatched record of philanthropic activities and would bring an unconventional style of getting things done to Washington. Add Rothstein to the short list." On November 4, 2009, Stone wrote, "Rothstein had no prior business success, no business acumen nor track record that would engender confidence in an investor. He could not read a balance sheet. He could not write or read a business plan. Rothstein was a lawyer, not an entrepreneur."

== Philanthropy ==
In 2007, Rothstein founded the Rothstein Family Foundation, which listed on its board socialite Bonnie Barnett, who was not implicated in the scheme, and Edward Morse and Les Stracher, who were implicated. In 2009, the foundation gave $1 million to Holy Cross Hospital in Fort Lauderdale, where a lobby was to be named for Rothstein and his wife. The hospital rejected the donation.

Musician and Eagles co-founder Don Henley created a non-profit called the Caddo Lake Institute near his home in Texas, to protect the wetlands and habitat of the Caddo Lake region. In 2009, Rothstein donated $100,000 to the institute. In return, the Eagles played their hit song "Life in the Fast Lane" for Rothstein's wife at her birthday party. After Rothstein's fraud came to light, Henley returned the donation.

Between 2007 and 2008, Rothstein donated, either through the foundation or through RRA, $2 million to the American Heart Association, Women in Distress, Alonzo Mourning Charities, Here's Help, Family Central, and the Dan Marino Foundation. A further $800,000.00 was donated to the Joe DiMaggio Children's Hospital. The foundation became inactive in 2010. A total of 30 charities either returned donations on their own, or were required to do so by RRA's bankruptcy trustee.

== Political contributions ==
Through RRA and various channels, Rothstein funneled $1 million to John McCain's 2008 presidential election campaign.

Politicians of both parties pledged to donate to charity or return other Rothstein pcontributions. On November 3, 2009, the Florida Republican Party, announced it would give Rothstein's donations ($600,000) to a charity. Gov. Charlie Crist's Senate Campaign ($700,000), state Chief Financial Officer Alex Sink ($2,050), Senate President Jeff Atwater, Rep. Ellyn Bogdanoff, and the Florida Democratic Party ($200,000) said that they would return some or all of his contributions.

== Personal life ==
At some point between 1990 and 1993, Rothstein adopted an orphaned boy.

Rothstein was married to attorney Kimberly Hill from 1993 to 2003.

Also in 1993, Rothstein fathered a daughter with a woman he had known in high school. Rothstein initially denied paternity, then re-entered their lives after his marriage ended. He bought them a house and, until his fraud was discovered, supported them financially.

In 2002, Rothstein met bartender and hostess Kimberly Wendell. They married in 2008. Kim Rothstein was facing five years in prison for money-laundering conspiracy, obstruction of justice and tampering with a witness (Scott Rothstein), in connection with her attempt to hide and sell more than $1 million worth of jewelry, watches and coins before IRS agents seized her husband's assets. In 2013, in exchange for her cooperation in the larger investigation, she was sentenced to 18 months in prison. She was ordered to get mental health and substance abuse treatment, and given an additional two years of probation. She was allowed to keep her wedding rings and Cadillac Escalade. That same week, she filed for divorce from Scott Rothstein.
