= Camilla Broe =

Dane accused of drug trafficking

- Convictions: Charges dismissed, released February 25, 2010

Camilla Broe is the first Danish citizen to be extradited to a country outside the European Union, when she was handed over to the American police after being indicted on 14 counts of drug trafficking. She would have faced a sentence of up to 60 years in prison if she were convicted, but would have served only 6 months in the US before being deported to Denmark to serve another 2 to 8 years.

== Alleged crime ==
Broe was indicted by a Florida grand jury on 14 counts of drug trafficking. The Danish courts had not been presented with any evidence by the authorities in Florida. Both courts are only ruling whether the United States application for her to be extradited fulfills the formal demands according to the extradition agreement between the two countries.

However, the media published stories from unknown officials claiming that Broe was alleged to have been one of the leaders of a drug smuggling operation which imported some 100,000 Ecstasy pills from the Netherlands to Florida towards the end of the 1990s. According to unnamed sources inside the Florida state attorney office, she was the partner of the head of the operation and not only helped to enlist smugglers, but also laundering the proceeds from the sale of the drugs.

Broe arrived at the United States in 1986 in order to study and then started a relationship with a man whom she later had a daughter with. The boyfriend turned out to be violent and at some point he became involved with the drug market. Allegedly, without her social network and living in a foreign culture (albeit for 4 years) she was not able to end the relationship and, for this reason, her defense is based on the Battered woman syndrome. When the police arrested the boyfriend she fled back to Denmark. At the time of the arrest of her partner the police informed her of the possibility that they may wish to inquire further into her involvement with the drug operations but she was not arrested nor formally charged. Broe is not denying that her boyfriend was involved in the drug market. Additionally, Broe confessed to involvement with arranging the drug couriers' trips.

== Life in Denmark ==
Camilla Broe and her daughter, from Jacob Orgad aka "Koki" convicted Ecstasy Drug Kingpin, returned to Denmark without any wealth and with no income. Family and friends supported them until she found a job. She is not known to have been involved in any criminal activity while living in Denmark.

== Timeline ==
On 7 August 2009, a board of Danish judges decided her case could be heard before the Danish Supreme Court.

She was placed on house arrest with work release until extradition could be processed. However, she was jailed when she appealed the ruling to European Court of Human Rights, the house arrest being changed to incarceration in jail. She was taken to Vestre Fængsel on 10 August 2009. This prison is regarded as very tough compared to the county jail in Elsinore, where she had been detained previously.

Her case has been accepted by the European Court of Human Rights, but it did not stop her from being extradited to Florida.

The family has now created a foundation in order to raise money for her defence because her personal financial situation is not sufficient to provide a legal defense.

She was detained at the Federal Detention Center in Miami. Her inmate number is #82672-004.

Expected trial date was March 2012, but political pressure forced the court to start the trial no later than 14 December 2009.

On 5 January 2010, the judge ruled that the charges were subject to statutes of limitations.

However, on 12 January 2010, the prosecution requested that the case be tried by a higher court authority, informing that a new trial date has been set to 1 March 2010.

On 25 February 2010, the court set her free but - because she entered the US under police escort - she faced charges of immigration violation.

She returned to Copenhagen on 1 March 2010. She had to take a direct flight as international arrest orders had not yet been cancelled.

On 22 March 2010 the appeal court followed the previous rulings and the case against her was dropped.

On 8 February 2013 the court in Lyngby awarded her DKK 701,362.11 for her time spent in Danish jails while she was waiting for the extradition case to be done. If she wants to seek compensation for her time spent in the United States she has to make case in the United States.

On 26 August 2014 decided the Danish Supreme Court that Camilla Broe not be entitled to compensation from the Danish State as conditions for extradition were met. If she wants compensation for her time in prison she must seek it in the United States for the time she spent in prison in Denmark and the US. The decision means that the Danish government never has to pay compensation in extradition cases. The Danish citizen must always seek compensation in the country in where he or she is extradited to.

Date or Period	Description
1986	Camilla Broe arrives in the United States where she meets her then boyfriend, Jacob Orgad aka "Koki". She becomes a naturalized citizen
1995 to 1998	The boyfriend engages in illegal drug smuggling Ecstasy from Europe to Florida. At this stage, the relationship had become violent.
July 2001	The police informs her that they consider investigating her unless she testifies against her former boyfriend. She chooses to return to Denmark
March 2003	She is secretly charged in Florida
December 2007	The police arrest her based on the Danish anti-terrorism laws until the extradition request can be validated.
May 2008	After having negotiated the terms of the extradition agreement between Denmark and the United States, the justice department in Denmark accept that she can be extradited if the court system find that the extradition request is in order.
August 2008	The Lyngby District Court rules that the human concern as described in the Human rights conventions Denmark has signed outweighs the extradition request from Florida.
July 2009	The Eastern High court rule that she should be extradited. She is taken into custody later that day but released a few days later because she does not impose a flight risk.
August 2009	Danish Appeals Permission Board denies her case to be heard before the supreme court. This ruling came as a surprise for legal experts in general, which has led some of the public to speculate whether the ruling is political
4 September 2009	She was extradited to the United States. A press conference was held at Copenhagen airport before she was turned over to the US Marshals. Two days before the extradition process it was discovered that the charges against her were not valid according to Danish laws, so the prosecution in the United States was allegedly ordered to alter the charges. She left Denmark on a commercial Delta Air Lines flight at 11:25. The Drug Enforcement Administration (DEA) Miami Field Division Special Agent in Charge, Mark R. Trouville announces the extradition of Camilla Broe, marking the first time a Danish citizen has ever been extradited to the United States. Broe was taken into custody by the United States Marshals Service in Denmark and transported to Fort Lauderdale, Florida to face U.S. drug trafficking charges. Broe is charged with a fourteen-count superseding indictment handed down on 3 September 2009, in the Southern District of Florida which charges him with importing MDMA, also known as “ecstasy”, into Miami from June 1997, to February 1998.
8 September 2009	An Initial Appearance in Federal Magistrate's court in Miami was held. She was denied bail. Trial date was expected to be 14 December 2009
16 October 2009	The prosecution has asked to delay the trial due to a wedding and the following honeymoon
12 November 2009	It was revealed that the Drug Enforcement Administration had her under surveillance in Denmark without notifying Danish authorities which is against the law in Denmark. A scheme to lure her to France where she could be abducted to the United States was prevented by the Danish police.
21 November 2009	The defense lawyer presented material to the court that revealed that Camilla Broe approached the authorities once she discovered that the investment company her fiancée ran was a front for a drug smuggling operation. She presented the local police with names of people involved who later were convicted in court for their part in the smuggling ring and was allegedly in the process of making deal to function as an undercover agent to help the authorities further when the investigation was transferred to the federal agency. The federal agency chose to ignore her and made plea bargains with the arrested smugglers she had turned in to frame her instead.
1 December 2009	A DEA agent testified in court that it was the minister of Justice in Denmark Lene Espersen, who allowed the extradition process to start. However the Ministry of Justice of Denmark and Lene Espersen herself denied they aided the extradition process. Documentation showed that the now 42-year-old Broe was facing six years in prison for allegedly smuggling 160,000 ecstasy pills into Florida in 1998. The prosecutor's evidence also showed that US authorities had considered Broe a fugitive and had attempted to find her and bring her back to the US for trial. Camilla Broe and her lawyers had been hoping to have her trial on charges of drug smuggling dismissed in the US, claiming the charges were subject to statutes of limitations and that the State of Florida authorities dawdled with the case But after allowing the defence's challenge on those grounds, the judge ruled that the case against the Dane will go on as scheduled, after the prosecution presented evidence contradicting the defence's assertions. However, other news channels report that it is not decided whether the trial should take place at all. A spokesperson for the Minister of Justice has stated that the DEA agent has committed Perjury by claiming that the Danish authorities urged to go forward with the extradition process. As result the parliament has demanded a hearing, which could result in vote of confidence. It could mean that the minister of justice should step down for his co-operation with foreign authorities
29 December 2009	The defense asked for the trial to be delayed for 40 days. At the same time the prosecution denied to show the communication between the prosecution and the Danish ministry of justice as they do not want the testimony by the DEA tested.
5 January 2010	The judge ordered the trial to start as planned on 11 January 2010 despite not having ruled whether the charges are too old. She has been urged to plead guilty to at least something due to the costs of the trial. However 6 January 2010 the judge ruled that the charges were subject to statutes of limitations and she was basically exonerated of all charges, however the prosecution appealed the decision.
12 January 2010	A hearing took place in the Danish parliament based on the statement made by the DEA agent during the pre-trial, in order to expose whether the Danish authorities forced the DEA to seek her extradition. The present Minister of Justice - Brian Mikkelsen denied any involvement by the Danes. Any Danish minister who lies to the parliament during hearings risks being put on trial, so Mikkelsen's statement undermines the statement given by the DEA agent
2 February 2010	It was reported that she is near bankruptcy which could mean that she would have to confess to some crimes as the level of public funded defense is very low
25 February 2010	After considering the appeal the judge set her free but criticized the prosecution of having placed in a poor position regarding the immigration rules. She is risking further detention until the U.S. Citizenship and Immigration Services can deport her.
26 February 2010	She was set free pending the appeal and was allowed to return to Denmark. However she facing difficulties finding a flight home
22 March 2010	The appeals court affirmed the previous rulings and the charges against her were dismissed.

== Extradition agreement ==
In December 2007 Denmark and the United States entered an agreement about the terms of extradition between Denmark and the United States. Some points of interest are:

- No later than 6 months after the sentence is handed out, the Danes must return to Denmark to serve their sentences.
- The length of the trial has no limits.
- The Danes will be given a new sentence based on Danish sentence limit upon their return to Denmark

Critics of this agreement claim that it motivates the extradited Danes to plead No contest as they probably will be released when returning to Denmark because charges like conspiracy, obstruction of justice are not punishable by Danish law. Second, the trial in Florida is estimated to last 5–7 years in Florida if she is trying to get acquitted, because the witnesses could be difficult to find because most of them have served out the sentence they got in return for testifying against her, and are now living in other countries.

Also, the length of the sentence is different. In Denmark "manddrab" (manslaughter) is the term used by the Danish penalty law to describe the act of intentionally killing another person. No distinction between manslaughter and murder exists. The penalty goes from a minimum of five years (six years in the case of regicide) to imprisonment for life (which in Denmark seldom results in more than 16 years' imprisonment).

== Public reaction ==
Many citizens are concerned about the alleged political deal and regard the trial in Florida as a show trial, but some, like the former editor of Ekstrabladet and adviser for the Minister for Family and Consumer Affairs Lars Barfoed, Karen Thisted had made critical and political comments about her actions.

A book was scheduled to be published in 2010. It remains unclear whether some of the profit will benefit the defence but Denmark has no Son of Sam law as it is considered fair in the Danish culture to get a balanced view of criminal cases.

Agencies providing counselling to possible future exchange students now use this case as example of the possible dangers student could risk facing unless they have an exit-plan ready so they can escape home fast if they learn or just witness criminal activity while living abroad. It is expected that the case will have a lasting effect of lowering the number of young Danes who choose to study or work abroad.

== See also ==
- Niels Holck - A Danish citizen wanted for his alleged role in the Purulia arms drop case in India.
- Abu Salem - An Underworld don who was extradited to India from Portugal.
