= Bros =

Bros may refer to:

- Bros, abbreviation for brothers
- Bros (British band), English boy band
- Bros (Canadian band), Canadian musical duo and side project of the Sheepdogs
- Brös, Italian cheese preparation
- Bros (chocolate bar), Dutch chocolate bar produced by Nestlé
- Bros (2022 film), an American romantic comedy directed by Nicholas Stoller
- Bros (2026 film), a drama film directed by Carol and Marina Rodríguez Colás
- "The Bros" (The Amazing World of Gumball), a television episode
- Bros Music, record label
- "Bros" (Wolf Alice song), a song released by Wolf Alice in 2015
- "Bro's" (song), a song released in 2006 by Panda Bear
- Baltimore Rock Opera Society, all-volunteer theatrical company located in Baltimore, Maryland, U.S.
- Dutch Bros. Coffee (NYSE: BROS), American coffee chain

== See also ==
- Bro (disambiguation)
- Bro culture, a male youth subculture associated with partying, fraternities, and sport
- Bruh (disambiguation)
- Broe, surname
- Super Mario Bros.
- Super Smash Bros.
- Warner Bros.
- Brother (disambiguation)
