= Aars Church =

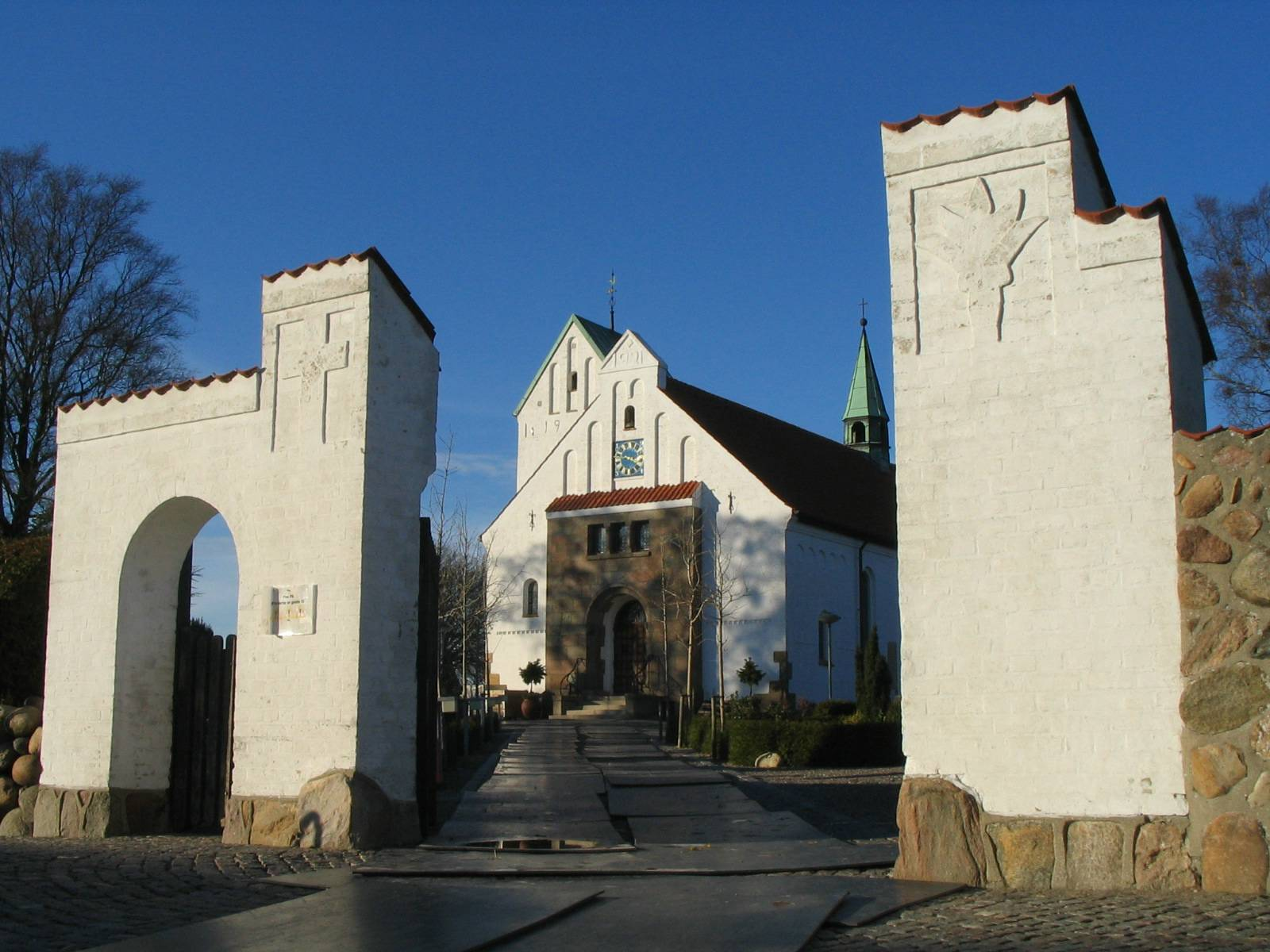
- Aars Church
- Aars Church
- 56.805°N 9.514°E
- Location: Aars, Vesthimmerland
- Country: Denmark
- Denomination: Lutheran
- Previous denomination: Catholic
- Website: www.aarskirke.dk

History
- Status: Church

Architecture
- Architectural type: Church
- Completed: Around 1200

Aars Church (Danish: Aars Kirke) is a Lutheran church in Aars, Vesthimmerland Municipality, North Denmark Region, Denmark.

== History and description ==
The original church on the site, the church of the mediaeval Aars parish, was a Romanesque granite building dating from the first half of the 13th century. By the 20th century the town of Aars which had grown up round it was much larger and it was necessary to expand it. In 1921, it was enlarged and extensively re-built on a cruciform plan; the re-build included the construction of a new nave. At the same time it was painted white.

The baptismal font was made by Christian Andersen in 1937 from a re-cycled steam roller; it includes the symbols of the four evangelists. The church also contains a large 18th-century crucifix and an altarpiece by Rudolf Petersen dated 1923 representing the Lord's Supper. The top of the communion table is a tombstone of blue slate.

The churchyard contains a runestone.
