= Christen Christian Larsen =

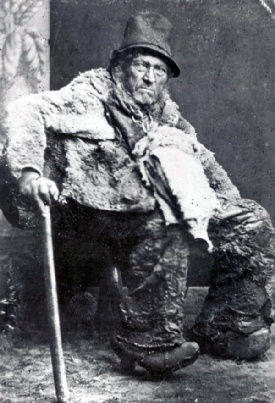
- Tordenkalven. Foto: N.C. Madsen
- Born: 12 September 1816; Stenildvad/Aars, Denmark
- Died: 5 December 1891 (aged 75); Veggerby, Denmark
- Burial place: Nørre Tranders Church
- Relatives: Lars Sørensen (father); Maren Christensdatter (mother)
- Military career
- Allegiance: Denmark
- Branch: Royal Danish Army
- Service years: 2 days
- Nickname: Tordenkalven

Christen Christian Larsen (1816-1891) was a disabled vagabond from Himmerland, Denmark, who had the nickname Tordenkalven (English: Thunder calf). His mother was Maren Christensdatter and his father, Lars Sørensen, a house servant. He is especially known through Johannes V. Jensen's story about him. Tordenkalven was born outside marriage on 12 September 1816 at Stenildvad in Aars parish. The family was very poor and he began to beg him for the family when he was only seven. After his confirmation he was employed on several farms. He was known for his enormous strength. When called up, he joined the infantry, but after two days in service he was discarded. During his appointment at the manor house Lundbæk at Nibe, he rode a horse, but it threw him off and he broke his leg. An incorrect coagulation of the femur disabled him and he went around on crutches as a tramp until his death in 1891. Tordenkalven died on 5 December 1891 at Søren in Veggerby near Nørre Tranders. He was buried at Nørre Tranders Church where a large granite stone carved by sculptor Carlo Vognsen stands as his memorial.

He is described in one of Johannes V. Jensen's short story collections about Himmerland and a photograph of Tordenkalven can be seen on the cover of Gyldendal's 1995 edition. Based on the story, Kirstine Brøndum wrote Tordenkalven published in 2002 by Samlerens Forlag. Johannes V. Jensen mentions that Tordenkalven also had the nicknames Klodden, Fylseplagen and Vædderlammet.
