= Federal Detention Center, Miami =

Prison operated by the Federal Bureau of Prisons

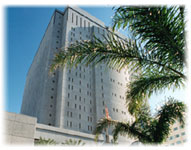
- Interactive map of Federal Detention Center, Miami
- Location: Miami, Florida; 25.77851°N 80.19322°W
- Status: Operational
- Security class: Administrative
- Population: 1,380
- Opened: 1995
- Managed by: Federal Bureau of Prisons
- Warden: E.K.Carlton
- Website: Official website

The Federal Detention Center, Miami (FDC Miami) is a federal prison in the downtown area of Miami, Florida, United States. It is operated by the Federal Bureau of Prisons, a division of the United States Department of Justice. The administrative facility employed 311 staff as of 2002 and housed 1,512 male and female inmates as of July 15, 2010.

== Background ==
Built in 1995, the detention center was designed for a capacity of 1,259 inmates. The facility primarily houses prisoners of the U.S. Marshals Service, both male and female. Its mission is to provide a safe and humane confinement of inmates and detainees, many of whom are involved in federal court proceedings in the Southern District of Florida.

== Security procedures ==
Inmates are screened by a unit team member, and assigned quarters based on personal profile and security needs. Each unit team is composed of a unit manager, case manager(s), correctional counselor(s), and at times, an education representative. A federal register number is assigned to each inmate for identification and forwarding of correspondence while in federal custody.

In June 2010, the facility's security procedures prevented attorney Brittney Horstman from meeting a client when her underwire bra set off a metal detector. After returning from a bathroom without the item, she was turned away because of the detention center's dress code. The federal public defender's office contacted Warden Linda McGrew, who conducted an inquiry. McGrew concluded the incident was "an aberration" and promised it would not happen again.

== Sexual victimization ==
According to a 2005 U.S. Department of Justice report, an estimated 12 percent of the complaints received by the department's inspector general involved inmates claiming sexual victimization by prison staff. In 2009, federal judge Cecilia Altonaga wrote that although the statute of limitations had passed to award damages in a civil case, "the BOP and FDC Miami did have notice of the illegal conduct taking place, and were woefully deficient in addressing it."

== Location ==
The prison is located in downtown Miami, at the corner of Northeast Fourth Street and North Miami Avenue. In 2021, a luxury apartment complex called "Downtown 5th" had been built opposite the prison on what was previously a parking lot. It went viral two years later for its rooftop pool area directly across the street from the prison, where sunbathing women in bikinis were shouted at by inmates.

== Notable inmates (current and former) ==
†Inmates in the Federal Witness Protection Program are not listed on the Bureau of Prisons website.

Inmate Name	Register Number	Photo	Status	Details
Esteban Santiago-Ruiz	15500-104		Transferred to USP Terre Haute. Serving five life sentences plus 120 years.	Killed five people and injured several others in the 2017 Fort Lauderdale airport shooting.
Jatavia Johnson	16486-104		Sentenced to serve a term of 24 months. Released from custody on October 8, 2019.	Member of rap duo City Girls; convicted of credit card fraud.
Douglas M. Hughes	62746-007		Received a 4-month sentence. Released from a halfway house on October 7, 2016.	Activist seeking campaign finance reform; landed a gyrocopter onto the U.S. Capitol Lawn in April 2015.
Harlem Suarez	06262-104		Transferred to USP Florence High. Serving a life sentence.	ISIS sympathizer; charged with attempting to detonate a backpack bomb on a public beach in Key West.
Simone Gold	26132-509		Released from custody on September 9, 2022.	Participant in the January 6 United States Capitol attack; sentenced to 60 days for trespassing in the Capitol. Pardoned by President Donald Trump on January 20, 2025.
Colton Harris-Moore	83421-004		Held at FDC Miami after being apprehended in the Bahamas in 2010. Released from prison in 2016.	Former fugitive known as the "Barefoot Bandit"; pleaded guilty in 2011 to engaging in a multi-state crime spree during which he stole several small planes and a boat, and committed numerous burglaries.
Paul Allard Hodgkins	30165-509		Released from custody on April 14, 2022.	Participant in the U.S. Capitol attack; sentenced to eight months in prison for obstructing an official proceeding. Pardoned by President Donald Trump on January 20, 2025.
Joseph Cartagena	64967-050		Served a 4-month sentence; released from custody on December 23, 2014.	Grammy Award–nominated rapper; pled guilty in 2012 to failing to file tax returns from 2007 to 2010 in order to avoid paying $718,000 in federal taxes.
Sean Kingston	25931-511		Transferred to FMC Lexington. Serving a 3-year sentence.	Rapper convicted in 2025 of wire fraud.
Scott W. Rothstein	Unlisted†		Moved to an undisclosed location after entering the Federal Witness Protection Program.	Attorney; pleaded guilty in 2010 to running a Ponzi scheme which defrauded investors out of $1.2 billion.
Camilla Broe	82672-004		Released from custody on February 26, 2010, after charges against her were dismissed.	First Danish citizen ever extradited to the United States; charged with importing MDMA into the country.
Ryan Wesley Routh	35967-511		Transferred to USP Victorville. Serving a life sentence.	Convicted of the attempted assassination of Donald Trump at his Florida golf course on September 15, 2024.
Andrew Tate	52354-506		Held at FDC Miami pending extradition to the United Kingdom.	Manosphere influencers; charged in the United Kingdom with rape, sex trafficking, assault, and child pornography offenses.
Tristan Tate	52355-506		Held at FDC Miami pending extradition to the United Kingdom.	Manosphere influencers; charged in the United Kingdom with rape, sex trafficking, assault, and child pornography offenses.

== See also ==
- List of U.S. federal prisons
- Federal Bureau of Prisons
- FCI Miami
- Incarceration in the United States
