= Havbro =

Havbro Haubro
- Village
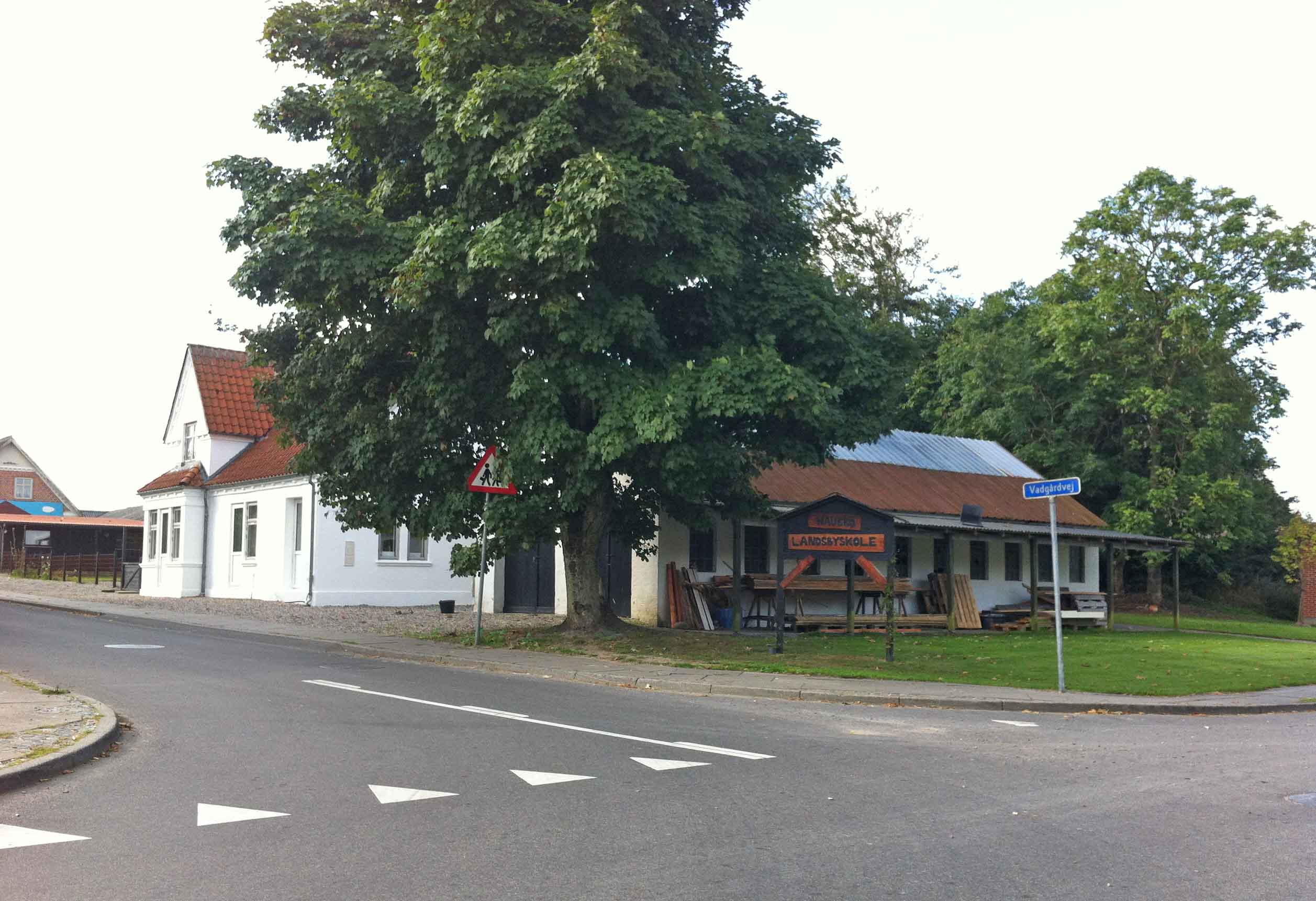
- Havbro Village School

- Location in North Jutland Region Havbro (Denmark)
- Coordinates: 56°48′04″N 9°24′59″E
- Country: Denmark
- Region: Region Nordjylland
- Municipality: Vesthimmerland

Population (2026)
  - Total: 354
- Time zone: UTC+1 (CET)
  - Summer (DST): UTC+1 (CEST)
- Postal code: 9600

Havbro is a village in western Himmerland with a population of 354 (1 January 2026), located 7 km northeast of Farsø and 6 km west of Aars. The village is part of Vesthimmerland Municipality and is located in North Jutland.

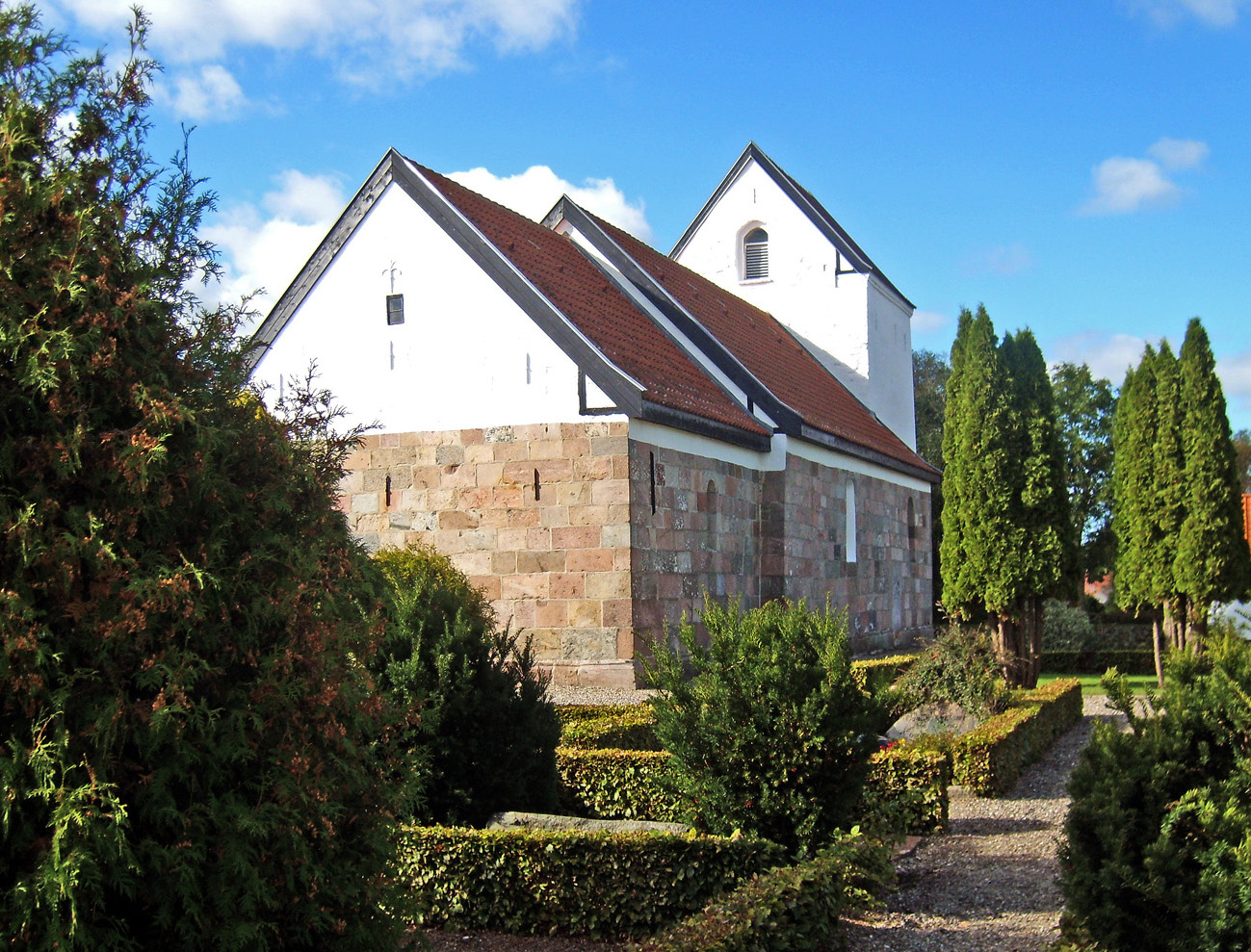
Havbro Church

Havbro is part of Havbro Parish and the parish church Havbro Church is located in the town.

In the late 1800s Havbro had a hall which was built in 1885, bakery and nursery. Havbro had a railway station on the Aalborg–Hvalpsund railway line from 1910 to 1969 when the line closed. The former station building is located on Elevvej 15. The old train track is made into a path you can run or walk on.

== School ==
Havbro Village School - Himmerlands Free School has 121 students at 0.-ninth grade, divided into 8 classes, of which 4 are read together in two steps. Free School also SFO robber cave with an activity and day care for pupils in 0th-fourth class. Sneglehuset(English: snailhouse) with kindergarten and nursery merged with the Free School 1 January 2015. [2]

Himmerlands Youth School is a boarding school, which was founded in 1920 and offers lessons in the 8th, 9th and 10th grade. The school has 19 employees and space for 120 students.
