= Niels Holck =

Danish activist and alleged terrorist

Niels Holck, also known as Kim Peter Davy and Niels Christian Nielsen (born 1961) is an alleged Danish terrorist and author known for his role in the Purulia arms drop case in India.

He is author of the book De kalder mig terrorist (transl. They call me Terrorist). He claims to have been involved in a 14-year journey from 1982 that involved building schools in Guatemala, agricultural projects in India and attending tiger conferences in Russia.

He is currently the manager of a company which sells houseboats.

== Terrorism claims ==
Holck was the prime suspect accused in the Purulia ammunition dropping case. He was given a red corner notice by Interpol.

Around 1995 he was involved in humanitarian work for the people in West Bengal, which at that time was governed by the Left Front. The authorities claim that he was involved in smuggling of weapons. He admits as much himself in his book They Call me A Terrorist, claiming that he made the weapon drop from a plane purchased in Latvia. Apparently his motives were to arm a militia and topple the democratically elected communist party government in West Bengal. A total of 4 tonnes of arms were trafficked during his dealings in West Bengal. Additionally, in 2010 Danish police confiscated two forged and expired passports with British names and the photo of Niels whilst searching his home.

In 2002 the Justice Minister Lene Espersen stated that he could not face extradition.

As of 2009 he is considered the second Dane together with Camilla Broe at risk of being extradited to a country outside the European Union. Camilla Broe was indicted for the importation of narcotics into the United States and while extradited and delivered to US custody was later returned to Denmark when the statute of limitations barred an expeditious trial.

On 9 April 2010, Danish police arrested him in order to start an extradition trial. Based on experiences from the fiasco in the Camilla Broe case the prosecution demanded detention but would accept a confiscation of his passport(s) if the court felt that the rather lengthy extradition process prevented him from keeping contact with his family. The extradition agreement between Denmark and India was changed so he would have to be returned home no later than 3 weeks after a sentence has been given at the expected trial abroad.

On 1 November 2010, the Hillerød Court overturned the Justice Ministry decision to extradite Niels Holck based on the expected inability to protect him against "rough treatment". On 14 November 2010, the Indian government stated that they would try to get him extradited despite the clear ruling of the court.

Among the allegations were that Niels Holck was smuggling weapons to Ananda Marga, an activist socio-spiritual organisation which follows an economic and political philosophy called PROUT.

=== Terms of the extradition agreement ===
Based on the experiences made from the Camilla Broe case, the extradition agreement between Denmark and India was improved in order to handle some of the problems experienced in the previous case.

- No execution of a possible death sentence (Unchanged from the previous agreement).
- Favourable and humane treatment of the extradited person while being detained abroad (changed due to the food condition experienced by Camilla Broe in the United States).
- Once convicted the person has to be returned to Denmark in order to serve the sentence within 3 weeks (previously 6 months) after the conviction.

Amnesty International did however criticize the extradition based on a lack of trust that countries like India have the resources to fulfill their part of such agreements. The United Nations Special Torture Rapporteur was quoted for the statement that the Indian guarantees that the man will not be tortured are worthless.

In April 2010, the news agency Press Trust of India reported that the Danish government has agreed to submit Niels Holck not only to the trial but also to serve out his entire sentence in India.

In September 2010, it was reported that the court system in India is not committed to follow the terms of any extradition agreement due to the ruling in the case against extradited underworld don Abu Salem who was extradited from Portugal to India. This ruling from the Supreme Court of India can influence the extradition case against Holck because the agreement between Denmark and India mandates that Holck cannot be convicted to death

On 30 June 2010, the High Court of Eastern Denmark ruled that he should not be extradited to India based on the risk of torture by the Indian authorities.

In June 2023, Danish authorities said that Holck was eligible for extradition to India. However, his extradition was stopped by the Hillerød District Court on 29 August 2024, citing a "real risk" of him facing torture and other forms of inhumane treatment in India.

=== Diplomatic rift between Denmark and India ===
On 16 August 2011, India decided to cut connections to Denmark except for diplomatic relations. The Indian authorities were upset over the Danish government’s stance to not appeal the decision of the Eastern Danish High Court in the Supreme court despite a special request from India’s minister of external affairs, S M Krishna, to his Danish counterpart and an assurance from Indian authorities to house Davy in a special jail, if extradited. The Indian government issued a circular directing senior officials to not meet or entertain any Danish diplomat posted in India.

Also, the funding activities of the Danish aid agency (DANIDA) to NGOs and civil liberties groups came under intense monitoring by the authorities in India. This was a consequence of the fact that Denmark would not extradite Holck and statements by the Danish Minister for Development Aid, Christian Friis Bach, that Denmark should “hand out rights instead of food to help people to fight for their own rights through demonstrations, campaigns, litigation or rights of access to public administration”.

== See also ==
- Camilla Broe – the first Danish citizen to be extradited to a country outside the European Union viz. United States for drug trafficking.
- Clotilde Reiss – a French student who was arrested (and released after about 10 months) by Iran for being an agent of the French Secret Service
- Abu Salem – an Underworld don who was extradited to India from Portugal
- Gary McKinnon
