= Slet, Aarhus =

Suburb of Aarhus, Denmark

Slet
- Neighborhood
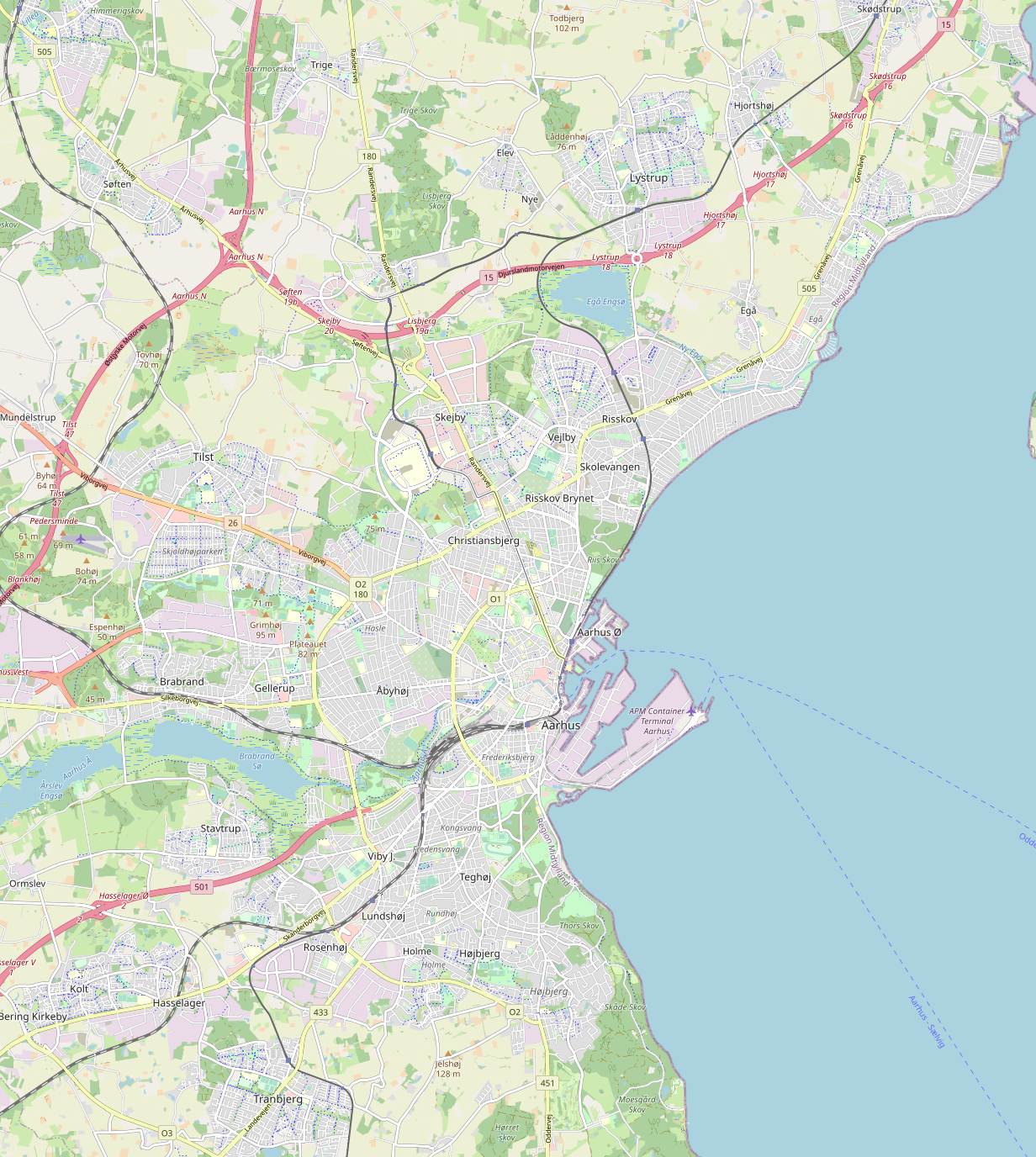
- Location within Aarhus
- Coordinates: 56.103407°N 10.143121°E
- Country: Kingdom of Denmark
- Regions of Denmark: Central Denmark Region
- Municipality: Aarhus Municipality
- District: Tranbjerg
- Postal code: 8310

Slet is a suburb of Aarhus in Denmark, roughly 5 kilometers south of the city, between Holme and Tranbjerg.

The town that would later become Slet was created in 1682.
