= Georg Broe =

Danish artist

Georg Alfred Broe (January 2, 1923 – 1998) was a Danish surrealist artist.
