= Albin C. Bro =

American missionary and diplomat (1893–1956)

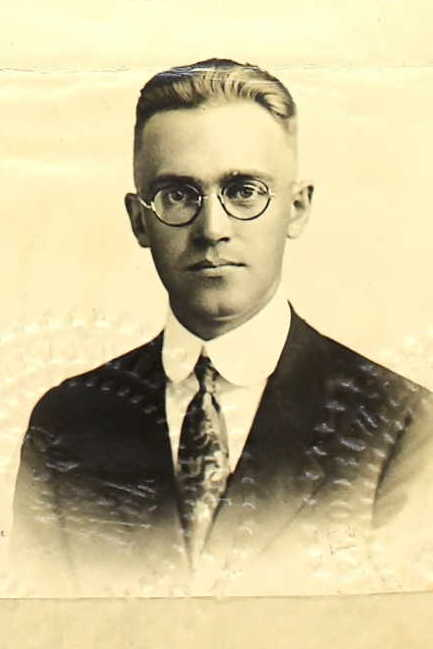
- Born: September 4, 1893; Prentice, Wisconsin
- Died: March 6, 1956 (aged 62)
- Education: University of Chicago

Albin Carl Bro (1893–1956) was a Christian missionary and educator, United States diplomat, and the fifth president of Shimer College.

== Early life and education ==
Bro was born in Prentice, Wisconsin on September 4, 1893. In 1917, he graduated as valedictorian from Northland College with a Bachelor of Arts. He entered into missionary service in China in 1919, working as an educational missionary until 1925, during which time he also served as a school principal. He then served for a year (1925–1926) as an instructor at the University of Nanking. According to the United States State Department's Register, he subsequently worked as an instructor at Northland College from 1927 to 1929, as a field secretary for a religious education association from 1929 to 1931, and as a field worker for a pension fund from 1931 to 1932.

From 1932 to 1939, Bro worked in sales for the University of Chicago Press. He obtained his Litt.D. degree from the university in 1941. He came to Frances Shimer Junior College as a product of the University of Chicago under Robert Maynard Hutchins.

== Presidency ==
Bro assumed the presidency of Shimer College in 1939 and served until 1949. He was the first Shimer president directly associated with the University of Chicago. Under his administration, efforts were made to adopt aspects of the general education curriculum from the College of the University of Chicago. In addition, Bro recruited faculty trained at the University of Chicago. These efforts ultimately bore fruit in the more radical transformation that occurred under Bro's successor, Aaron Brumbaugh.

Throughout Bro's tenure, Shimer was a women's junior college. It was known as "Frances Shimer Junior College" until 1942 and as "Frances Shimer College" thereafter.

== Later life ==
In 1949, Bro left the presidency of Shimer and was appointed a Foreign Service Reserve officer. He was assigned to Seoul as a cultural attaché on November 25, 1949. He was initially granted only a one-year leave of absence from his Shimer position, as the State Department appointment was tentative. However, Bro continued in this capacity until 1953. He was succeeded as president of Shimer by Aaron Brumbaugh of the University of Chicago.

After his diplomatic service was complete, Bro returned to the Hyde Park neighborhood of Chicago. In 1956, Bro co-founded the Spiritual Frontiers Fellowship, a Spiritualist organization, together with Arthur Ford and Paul Higgins. He died of a heart attack shortly thereafter, on March 6, 1956, while walking to church.

Albin Bro was the husband of Margueritte Harmon Bro, a prolific writer of children's and religious literature. Their son Harmon Bro later served as chairman of the Board of Trustees of Shimer College.

== See also ==
- History of Shimer College
