= Bro (singer) =

Danish singer

Kevin Andreasen (born in Rødovre, Denmark on 13 April 1996), better known by the stage name Bro, is a Danish singer.

Bro signed a contract with Hurricane Records which is part of Universal Music. His debut single "Hvor er du bro?" was certified platinum in 2016. His hit "Sydpå", the 2018 season theme for Paradise Hotel reality television, has topped Hitlisten, the Official Danish Singles Chart.

Before his musical career, Andreasen was developing a professional sports career as a footballer, playing for Brøndby IF's juniors team. He was selected for the Denmark national under-16 football team, playing two international games for the selection in 2011 against the Israel national under-16 football team.

== Discography ==
=== Singles ===
Year	Single	Chart positions	Album
Year	Single	DEN	Album
2016	"Hvor er du bro?"	4	
2017	"Er nettet nede?"	30	
2018	"Sydpå"	1	
2018	"Glad"	7	
2018	"Ja"	32	
2019	"Døgnrytme"	20	
2019	"Skør"	34	
2019	"Igen i år"	32	
2020	"Jeg vil la' lyset brænde"	28	
