= Margueritte Harmon Bro =

American novelist

- Born: Margueritte Harmon; August 5, 1894; David City, Nebraska, US
- Died: February 21, 1977 (aged 82); Park Forest, Illinois, US
- Occupations: Minister; missionary; author

Margueritte Harmon Bro (August 5, 1894 – February 21, 1977) was an American minister, missionary in China, and author of books. Her article about the American seer Edgar Cayce, "Miracle Man of Virginia Beach," published in the magazine Coronet in 1943, resulted in a deluge of inquiries to the magazine and to Cayce. Bro's books were reviewed by scholarly journals and one of her books was recommended to be used in elementary schools by the Arkansas Department of Education.

== Personal life ==
Bro was born in David City, Nebraska, to Andrew Davidson Harmon and Alice Harmon on August 5, 1894. Andrew Davidson Harmon was a Disciples of Christ minister at churches in St. Paul, Minnesota, and Omaha, Nebraska, president of Transylvania College, and president of the International convention of the Disciples of Christ. She attended Cotner College, graduating in 1917.

Harmon married Albin C. Bro in 1918. Bro and her husband moved to China, where they headed a boys' school in the central part of the country. Their son, Harmon Bro, was born in China. Their daughter Alice Bro Racher was born in Kuling in 1923. They also had a son named Kenneth. While in China, Bro became close friends with Pearl Buck, who was also teaching at the University of Nanjing at that time.

Bro died in her home in Park Forest, Illinois, on February 21, 1977, aged 82. She was buried at Greenwood Cemetery in Cable, Wisconsin.

== Career ==
Bro was a church minister and was a missionary in China. She was described in a newspaper as "one of the outstanding leaders of the Congregational Christian Church".

Bro co-authored the book Invitation to the Theater with Frank Hurburt O'Hara in 1938. In 1941, Bro wrote a booklet, Your Roommate's Roommate, for the incoming students at Frances Shimer College. Bro's first solo book, When Children Ask, was published by Harper & Brothers in 1940. Her next book, Thursdays at Ten, told the story of Myrtle Dean Clark. That book was followed by Every Day a Prayer.

Bro published two articles in 1943 about Edgar Cayce after a week-long visit to observe the latter's work in March 1943. Her first article was published in The Christian Century, and her second article, "Miracle Man of Virginia Beach", appeared in the September 1943 issue of Coronet magazine. The magazine's editors "had been forced to commandeer a whole wing of their floor in a downtown Chicago skyscraper just to answer letters and phone calls about Cayce". Shortly after the article was published, Bro's son Harmon Bro, then a graduate student in theology at the University of Chicago, and his new wife June Avis Bro, a graduate student in piano performance, went to work for Cayce for a year to help with the correspondence he had received. Cayce showed them that in the Cayce family dining room, "stacked waist high along every empty wall space, were bundles of letters still in their envelopes. The home's library was similarly stacked with envelopes three feet high".

Bro published Let's Talk About You, an advice book for young women, in 1945. Her book More Than We Are was first published in 1948, then revised and enlarged in 1965. Bro began writing fiction for young people in 1949, with the book Sarah, her first novel which was also enjoyed by adults. It took her almost ten years to write Sarah.

In 1951, Bro co-authored In the One Spirit, the autobiography of Minneapolis psychic Harrie Vernette Rhodes. After Albin received an appointment in 1950 as U.S. State Department cultural attaché to Indonesia, Bro and her husband lived in that country. Bro traveled extensively throughout Indonesia to research and write Indonesia: Land of Challenge, published in 1954.

Bro's fiction for young people included Stub, A College Romance, Three—and Domingo, The Animal Friends of Peng-Yu, and How the Mouse Deer Became King.

Bro co-authored Nothing So Strange, the autobiography of psychic Arthur Ford. She co-authored another autobiography, Never a Dull Day, about Myrtle Walgreen, who with her husband founded the Walgreens drugstore chain. Bro's final book was The Book You Always Meant to Read: The Old Testament.

== Accolades ==
Bro's book Three—and Domingo was part of The Horn Book Magazine's best books of 1953. Her first novel, Sarah, was praised in a review in the Chicago Tribune: "No longer can girls in their upper teens legitimately complain there aren't being written for them books mature enough to hold their interest and help them find the answers to living they all are seeking. Not while there’s a book like 'Sarah' to fill their hearts, open their minds and move their spirits. For this portrait of a talented young musician from her childhood to her early 20s is both intimate and moving, sparing none of the inner conflicts, her happiness and sorrows, her triumphs and defeats".

A review of her non-fiction book Indonesia: Land of Challenge in the journal International Affairs stated: "Mrs. Bro has, however, a real feeling for the people of Indonesia and sincere affection for them, and so the picture which she draws and the conclusions which she bases on her observation are well worthy of study". A New York Times review stated: "She include[s] much intelligent first-hand observation and interpretation of a country that is as fascinating as it is little known".

Kirkus Reviews wrote of her non-fiction book More Than We Are: "Seekers for the deeper spiritual life, of whatever faith, will find it helpful. Among the best of the recent devotional books, both as to content and style". The Hartford Courant reviewed When Children Ask, stating: "She is to be admired for her practical understanding of so many different aspects of life. ... We can think of no book which forms a more solid basis for education in the home". A 1945 review of her book Every Day a Prayer in the Journal of the American Academy of Religion said: "The uniqueness of Margueritte Harmon Bro's anthology is the selection of passages not only from the Hebrew-Christian scriptures, but from Mohammedan, Persian, Chinese, and Indian religious literatures and in addition from a wide variety of individual authors, ancient and modern, religious and secular".

On March 4, 1939, Bro's non-fiction about cities, titled Urban Scene, was recommended by the Indianapolis Times as a supplement to the book Church written by Chicago Theological Seminary associate professor Samuel C. Kincheloe. A July 1939 review from The Baptist Herald stated: "For the Christian who is interested in this subject of the church and the city but who must 'read as he runs' because of limited time, no finer recommendation could be made than the paper-bound handbook, "Urban Scene" by Margueritte Harmon Bro".

In September 1972, Bro's children's book Su-Mei's Golden Year was recommended for use in elementary schools by the Arkansas Department of Education in relation to learning about ethnic groups. Su-Mei's Golden Year was reviewed favorably by the New York Times: "The author's perceptive characterizations make these people as real as old friends. ... In this absorbing story the author demonstrates her belief in the friendship that develops when two peoples come to know each other".

Her biography on the University of Nebraska Omaha Alumni Association's website states: "If nothing else, Margueritte Harmon Bro proved she had staying power. One of the first students to attend Omaha University in the 1910s, Bro became a pioneering and prolific female journalist in the first half of the 20th century and one of that era's better known authors".
