= Oškinis BRO-23KR Garnys =

BRO-23KR Garnys

General information
- Type: Primary glider
- National origin: USSR
- Manufacturer: Česlovas Kišonas and K. Rinkevičius at Kaunas.
- Designer: Bronis Oškinis
- Number built: 2

History
- First flight: 1981

The Oškinis BRO-23KR Garnys (Stork) is a glassfibre primary glider, built in the USSR in the early 1980s. Only two were completed.

== Design and development ==
The BRO-23KR was designed by Bronis Oškinis and constructed by Česlovas Kisonas and K. Rinkevičius (the KR of the name) at the Kaunas hang gliding club. Designed in 1981, it was intended to replace the BRO-11M (LAK-2) after production ended in 1979. It first flew in 1981.

The BRO-23KR is a glassfibre aircraft with a strut and wire-braced high wing and a pod and boom fuselage with an open-sided cockpit and a T-tail. Its wing is rectangular in plan out to blunted and turned-down tips and both its single spar and ribs are formed from woven glassfibre. Three-ply glasscloth skin ahead of the spar forms a torsion resistant D-box. The narrow trailing edge of the wing was cast in epoxy with spanwise glassfibres and glasscloth covered. The whole wing was then covered with glued and thermally bonded, transparent polyethylene terephthalate film. It has narrow, full span, slotted ailerons, operating in co-ordination with rudder deflections and built in the same way as the wings. Single struts on each side brace the spar to the lower fuselage.

The fuselage of the BRO-23KR is formed from two GRP halves and attached to the wing centre-section. It has a long, shallow open cockpit which stretches back under the wing with the pilot in a reclined position. The tail unit, constructed in a similar way to the wing, has a highly swept, near-rectangular fin with a high aspect ratio horizontal tail mounted on its top. Its rather angular rudder, on a backward-leaning hinge, is large.

The BRO-23KR has very adaptable landing gear based on a landing skid sprung on five rubber blocks, which stretches nearly from the nose to just aft of the spar. The skid is wide enough to land on snow but can be fitted with a tyred wheel in summer. More unusual attachments include a set of introductory tricycle wheels and floats for landing on water. There is a long, self-sprung GRP landing skid under the tail.

== Operational history ==
Only two BRO-23KRs were constructed, the prototype and one built in 1984 by Panévežio Atsk. One took part in the 2nd World Championship, an Eastern European series gliding contest distinct from the FAI event, where it showed distinct improvements over earlier Soviet primary gliders. Both aircraft remained airworthy in 2015.

In 1982 the prototype was motorized into the BROK-1M, with a largely uncowled, pusher configuration, 25 hp (19 kW) engine. Its installation, designed by Kišonas, placed it well above the rear part of the wing on forward and aft transverse V-struts from the central wing mountings, laterally braced on each side by a long strut out to the wing. It used the tricycle landing gear.

In 2009 one airframe remained in the Sport Aviation Museum in Kaunas but there was no information about its identity or condition or if it was on open display.

== Variants ==
BROK-1M
First prototype BRO-23KR motorized.

== Specifications ==
Data from Jane's All the World's Aircraft 1990-91

General characteristics

- Crew: one
- Length: 6.40 m (21 ft 0 in)
- Wingspan: 8.20 m (26 ft 11 in)
- Height: 2.2 m (7 ft 3 in)
- Wing area: 10.40 m^{2} (111.9 sq ft)
- Aspect ratio: 6.5
- Airfoil: GA(W)-1
- Empty weight: 83.5 kg (184 lb)
- Gross weight: 158.5 kg (349 lb)

Performance

- Maximum speed: 100 km/h (62 mph, 54 kn) smooth air
- Stall speed: 42 km/h (26 mph, 23 kn)
- Maximum glide ratio: 15
- Rate of sink: 1.0 m/s (200 ft/min) minimum
