= Purulia arms drop case =

1995 incident of unauthorised arms drop in Purulia, West Bengal, India

- Date: 17 December 1995
- Location: Purulia, West Bengal, India
- Participants: Niels Holck (Kim Davy), Peter Bleach, Latvian crew
- Arrests: Peter Bleach, Latvian crew
- Convicted: Peter Bleach, Latvian crew
- Charges: Unauthorised arms drop
- Verdict: Life imprisonment (later pardoned and released)

The Purulia arms drop happened on 17 December 1995 when unauthorised arms were dropped from an Antonov An-26 aircraft in Purulia district in the Indian state of West Bengal. The chief accused "Kim Davy" (real name Niels Holck, alias Niels Christian Nielsen) has been vocal about his involvement in the arms drop. He asserts he tried to procure arms to protect members of Ananda Marga from communists and claims that it was a conspiracy of the Congress Indian government together with R&AW and MI5 to overthrow the communist government in West Bengal and he was given assurances from the central government about his safety and return to Denmark. He further alleges that MP Pappu Yadav, in association with the then Prime Minister of India P. V. Narasimha Rao facilitated his safe exit from India. Niels Holck is author of the book De kalder mig terrorist (transl. They call me Terrorist). Niels Holck was involved in a 14-year journey from 1982 involved in community building projects like building schools in Guatemala, agricultural projects in Ananda Nagar, Purulia, India and attending tiger conferences in Russia. According to Holck, the Government of India at the time permitted arms drop operation for Ananda Marga to be able to protect its projects and people from the onslaught of Communists in Bengal. The Communists in Bengal had been targeting and killing people involved with Ananda Marga projects right from the 1970s, and this continued well into the 1990s.

== Background ==
A Latvian aircraft dropped a large consignment of arms including several hundred AK-47 rifles and more than sixteen thousand rounds of ammunition over a large area in Jhalda, Khatanga, Belamu, Maramu villages of Purulia district on the night of 17 December 1995. Several days later, when the plane re-entered Indian airspace, it was intercepted by an Indian Air Force MiG-21 and forced to land in Mumbai.

== Motive and recipient ==
While the true motive is shrouded in mystery and conjecture, the BBC, after its investigation into it, alleged that arms were intended for the socio-spiritual organization Ananda Marga. Niels Holck, who claims the central government itself was behind the arms drop to disrupt harmony and exterminate the CPI(M) supporters, has been vocal about his involvement in procurement of weapons to help protect the mission of Ananda Marga in Purulia from CPI(M). Niels Holck (Kim Davy) has given numerous public interviews about his involvement in the arms drops and has asserted that he was compelled to procure arms to protect members of Ananda Marga with whom he had formed close friendships, working shoulder to shoulder on social service projects in Ananda Nagar, Purulia, since the State of West Bengal and Government of India in 1995 were ineffective in curbing violence against Ananda Marga. He has said in all his public interviews and the documentary that the central government at the time and RAW supported this arms drop operation as destabilizing CPI(M) in West Bengal worked in the interest of the central government.

An Indian court in 1997 determined that the Ananda Marga group was indeed the intended recipient of the guns and ammunition. Based on the pilot's testimony, along with other evidence such as a photograph of the Ananda Marga headquarters on the aircraft, the Judge ruled: "as per the materials available I hold that it has been established from the materials on record that the places where the arms were targeted to be dropped were of Anandamargies and precisely three storied white building was the target point and at that target point the arms were tried to be dropped from a flying aircraft and the aircraft has been pin pointed as per the evidence and materials on record." However, despite the passage of years, many details of the incident are wrapped in mystery, and there has been considerable speculation as to the purpose and modality of the operation.

== Arrest and sentencing ==
The crew of the aircraft consisted of five Latvian citizens and Peter Bleach, a British citizen and an ex Special Air Service operative turned mercenary who was based in Yorkshire and involved in arms dealing. (However, Annie Machon, the former MI5 officer, accuses Bleach of being an MI6 agent in her book "Spies, Lies and Whistleblowers". In numerous interviews, Bleach has always evaded questions on this subject and has declined to answer questions on his military background.) According to Bleach, he told Defence Export Services Organisation and local North Yorkshire Police Special Branch about the planned delivery of weapons to India in August 1995 as soon as he discovered it was illegal. He claimed that he continued to arrange to buy a plane from the Latvian state airline with police approval. However, North Yorkshire Police's Special Branch denied this.

Peter Bleach and the Latvian crew were arrested and sentenced to life imprisonment while alleged organiser Niels Christian Nielsen (aka Kim Peter Davy), a Danish citizen and member of the Ananda Marga group, escaped. Later, an Interpol red notice was issued against him. Following the intervention of Russian authorities, the Latvian crew (who gained Russian citizenship while in Indian custody) were later pardoned and released in July 2000. An appeal has been submitted by the pilots lawyer before the Calcutta High Court in March 2000 challenging the trial results and the judgement but it is still pending. Peter Bleach, too, was released on 4 February 2004, via a presidential pardon, allegedly due to persistent British Government pressure.

In 2007 Kim Davy was traced by Denmark authorities and on 9 April 2010 Danish government decided to extradite Kim Davy to India but Danish authorities failed to successfully defend their decision in the Danish high court. The court, therefore, refused extradition of Kim Davy to India. Further, Danish authorities decided not to appeal the high court judgement to the Supreme Court.

== Recent development ==
On 8 October 2008, the extradition of the key accused, Kim Davy, real name Niels Holck, was close to being finalized as the government had, in principle, agreed on giving "sovereign assurance" to the Danish authorities on their conditions, as well as bringing about some changes in the existing extradition law. One of the conditions Denmark had set included the waiving of the death penalty if Davy was convicted by a court for his involvement in the dropping of a huge cache of arms and ammunition from an aircraft in West Bengal in 1995.

On 28 April 2011, Kim Davy came forward to allege that both the Indian government (Congress party) as well as its intelligence agency R&AW were aware of the precise details of the arms drop well in advance, and that the whole operation was conducted with the implicit agreement of the Indian authorities. Both Peter Bleach and Kim Davy claimed that the aim of the arms drop was to help anti Left government dissidents and to create a pretext to impose President's Rule in West Bengal.

On 29 April 2011, Central Bureau of Investigation denied all allegations of involvement or collusion in the arms drop. Questions have been raised if Kim Davy's 'sensational revelation' was aimed to stall the extradition efforts of India. Some political analysts have also questioned the 'timing of the revelation' which may help the Left parties in the ongoing state government assembly elections.

On 30 June 2011, Central Bureau of Investigation has been denied to extradite Kim Davy a.k.a. Niels Holck to India for further proceedings in India. The Danish High Court, after hearing evidence from Peter Bleach who described his personal experiences in prison in Kolkata, dismissed the plea on the grounds of "torture or other inhuman treatment".

The Bangladeshi MP and retired Major-General Mohammed Shubid Ali Bhuiyan had been accused of involvement in the case. The CBI had submitted to the Calcutta High Court two end-user certificates, required for international arms deals, allegedly signed by Bhuiyan in his capacity as the PSO of the Armed Forces Division of the office of the then prime minister of Bangladesh, Begum Khaleda Zia. The certificates had been recovered by the British police, who assisted the CBI in the probe, in raids on Bleach's estate. One of the certificates – issued on 25 November 1995 – authorized Bleach's front company, Border Technology and Innovations Ltd, to conclude the contract with the Bulgarian suppliers stating that the arms will be used by the Bangladesh Army and will not be exported to any other country. The boxes containing the weapons, found in Purulia, had been marked for Rajendrapur Cantonment in Bangladesh. However, the Government of Bangladesh as well as Bhuiyan has denied the allegations and maintain that the certificates were forged by Bleach's contacts in Bangladesh.

In June 2014, Purulia arms drop case resurfaced with new revelations after the release of a Danish documentary The Arms Drop.

In March 2015, a book by Chandan Nandy titled The Night it Rained Guns: Unravelling the Purulia Arms Drop Conspiracy was released.

== In popular media ==
- The story of the 2017 film Jagga Jasoos, starring Ranbir Kapoor, Katrina Kaif and Saswata Chattopadhyay, revolves around the infamous high-profile case of Purulia arms drop.
- Arms Drop – a 2016 Danish documentary about this case. Retrieved September 2020
- Peter Bleach gave his account of the operation and his incarceration in Season 13 Episode 4 of the British television series Banged Up Abroad.
