= BrO =

The molecular formula BrO may refer to:

- Bromine monoxide radical (BrO^{·})
- Hypobromite (BrO^{−})
