= Borgring =

Viking fortification in Denmark

Coordinates: 55°28′11″N 12°7′20″E

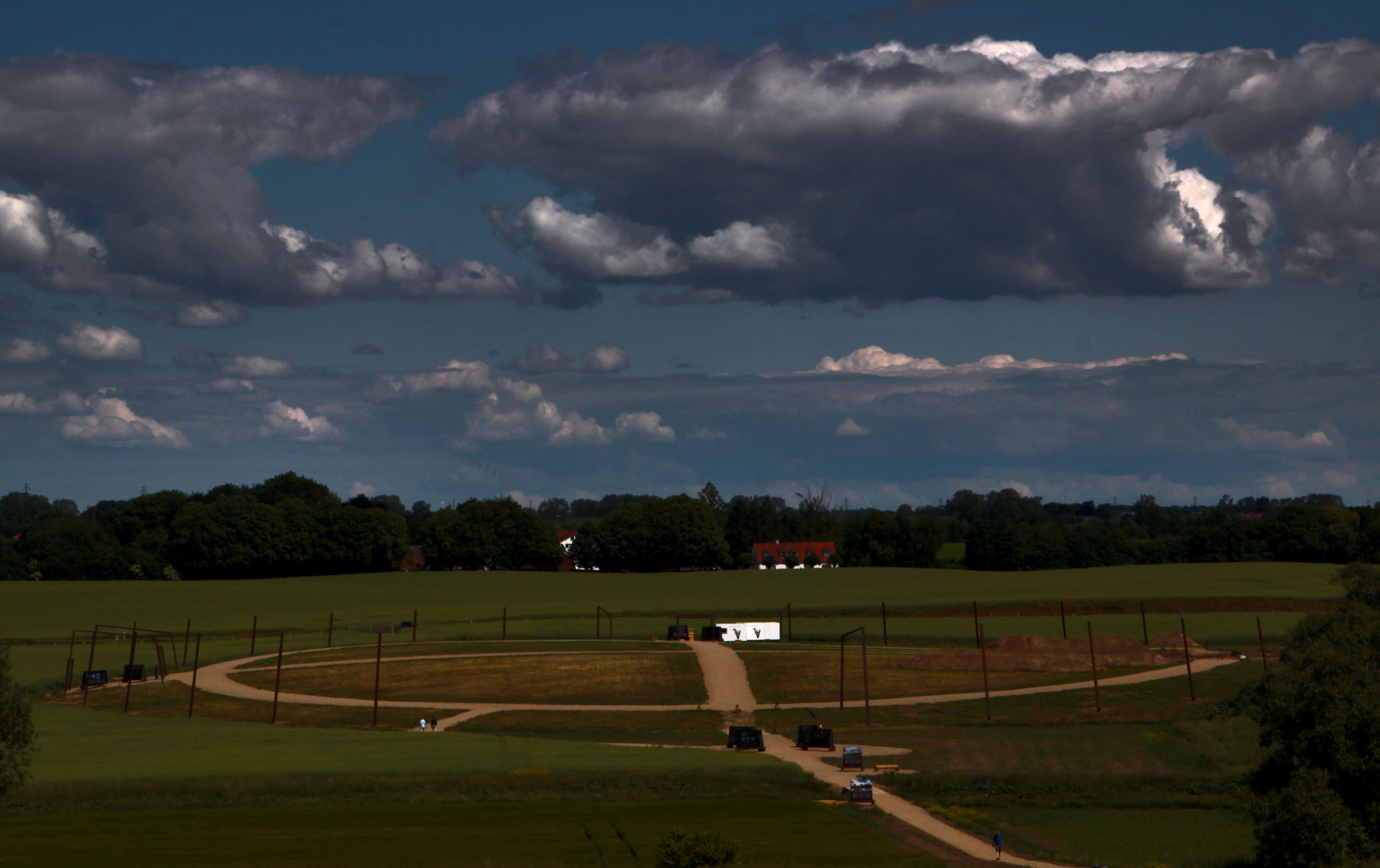
- Borgring with the outline visible and metal bars showing the location and approximate size of the original outer walls

- Location of the site in Denmark
- Type: Viking ring fortress
- Periods: Iron Age, Viking Age
- Location: Zealand, Denmark

History
- Built: c. 980

UNESCO World Heritage Site
- Criteria: Cultural:
- Designated: 2023 (45th session)
- Part of: Viking-Age Ring Fortresses
- Reference no.: 1660-001

Borgring (older spelling Borrering) also known as Vallø Borgring, is a Danish Viking ring fortress located near Køge on the island of Zealand. Likely built around 970 or 980, the fortress may have been built to defend trade routes or as a military barracks. In 2023, along with four other Viking ring fortresses, Borgring was isncribed on the UNESCO World Heritage List for its unique architecture and testimony to the strategic and military power of the House of Knýtlinga (Jelling dynasty).

== Description ==
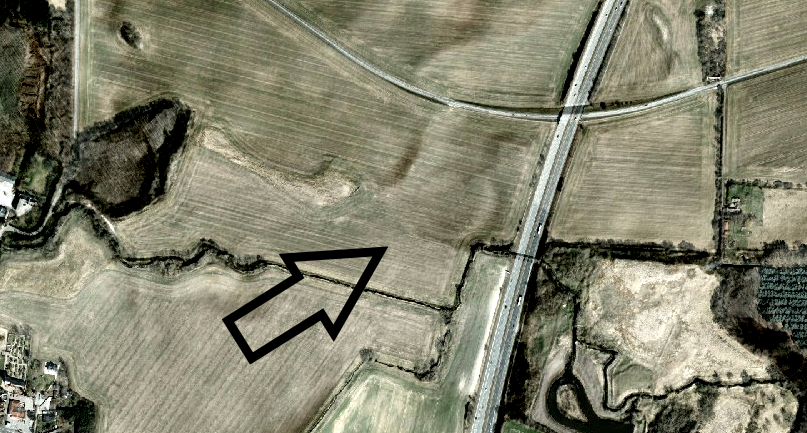
Post-edited satellite photo of Borgring before it was partially re-established

Borgring is circular in shape and spans 145 metres across and thus ranks third among the original, Danish Viking ring fortresses. It featured a 10–11-meter wide rampart and was shielded by a palisade, made by pointed wooden stakes. No fortification moat has been uncovered, but the Ellebækken stream running due west of the fortification might have offered a natural defence as might a small lake to the north/north-east. During the excavation in 2014 the northern and eastern gates were found just where they would be expected to be in a trelleborg-type fortification.

Borgring could join the group of trelleborgs which include Trelleborg at Slagelse, Nonnebakken at Odense, Fyrkat at Hobro and Aggersborg next to The Limfjord. These fortifications have all been dated to ca. 980 a.d., however, conclusive dating of Borgring remains to be done.

During the Viking Age the fortress would have enjoyed a strategic, geographical advantage overlooking the presumed old high road, perhaps from Roskilde or Ringsted, and near the two streams in Køge Ådal, offering easy access to the Bay of Køge, one of the best natural ports on Zealand.

== Name ==
Borrering is the older name of the area; 1682: Borre Ring; 1877 & 1992: Borrering. The written sources for this dates back to 1682. The name has been subject to some modification through the ages leading to a plethora of variations in different contexts. The name may have been used either to denote the present day location or the bank immediately east of Gl. Lellingegård:

«the place name with great certitude has moved geographically. Maps from the late 1800s will reveal Borgring or Boring to be the name of a small forest some 300 metres west of the ring fortress.»

In 1682 the name Borrering is also synonymous with Borre Rings Aggere and Borre Rings Agre. An undated land register (pre-1850 ?) supplies the name Borrerings Mark, and a guide from 1860 offers Borgrings Marken. Military and topographical maps through the ages contain versions such as Boring (1897) and Borgring (1911, 1941 and 1983), and a forest map from 1925 uses Borgringen.

In 1875, the variant Borgerring was used.

In 1877 Anders Petersen uses the form Borrering in his book: Vallø og Omegn.

The 3rd and 4th editions of Trap Danmark (Statistisk-topografisk Beskrivelse af Kongeriget Danmark) from 1898 and 1921, respectively, use the name Borgering.

The version Borring appears in an old legend, and is used a few times between 1911 and 1946.

The name Borrering has been used several times in recent studies, e.g. in 1992 and in 2009, 2010 and 2011.

The primary name of Borrering has been recorded by The Department of Nordic Research (Nordisk Forskningsinstitut) at University of Copenhagen, although the department only records instances found on maps and in land registers while ignoring literature and other institutes. Therefore, the versions of the name used by Sophus Müller, Trap Danmark, during the excavations led by Thorkild Ramskou in 1971–72, in the National Museum registry and Harald Andersen are not mentioned. The department has not registered usage of the recent past. This means to suppose that the recordings of The Department of Nordic Research as for now is of limited usability as a source to naming convention and usage concerning Borrering over the years - including the recent years.

Even more recent names are Vallo ring-fortress, also Borgringen ved Lellinge, Lellinge Ringborg, and more..

The new name versions have appeared almost supplanting the original name. Especially in 2013–2014 there has been a trend towards new names for the fortress. Borgringen ved Lellinge has been used a few times in 2013–2014, and the shorter version Borgring on several occasions. The Chapter of Vallø stirred waters when, during publication of the preliminary excavation results in September 2014, they wanted to rename the fortress Vallø Borgring. In response to this and following vocal opposition, a Facebook group was created on 8 September 2014 to promote the name Lellinge Ringborg. This version has been used by the Viking Ship Museum in Roskilde.

"Borre" as a name or word has several denotations in Danish, but for this discussion it seems most relevant to consider "fortified site" or just "fortress". So, in terms of naming, Borrering becomes part of a group of pre-historic fortifications that include Borremose fortified settlement in Himmerland, Borreknold on Falster and Borrehoved on Bornholm.

== Legends ==
It is said about the largest church bell in Højelse Church that ..., upon its inaugural knell, the ancient castle of »Borring« by Lellinge stream sank deep into the earth.

== Research history ==
=== Preliminaries ===
The place Borre Ring is first mentioned in a 1682 land register as part of Christian V's cadastral map.

The fortress is reportedly outlined on an 1805 land map of Lellingegård.

The fortress was first mentioned in an archaeological context by Sophus Müller in 1875:

«Right to the east of the farm [Gl. Lellingegaard] lies a bank called "Borgerring" and by virtue of its location next to the stream [...]»

although no certain date was offered.

The US Air Force aerial photo (ortho-photo) from Basic Cover 1954 and provided by COWI shows the fortress as a somewhat blurry shadow on the field.

It was only after echo-photography in November 1970 that it was suggested there might be an actual trelleborg near Lellinge; the circular structure was recognized on a photography by warrant officer Valdemar Ryhl from Air Base Karup.

In 1971–72, the Danish National Museum, represented by Thorkild Ramskou, conducted excavations on the site, but the research technology available at the time left the embankment itself undated. Evidences of settlement and middens were dated to the Roman Iron Age. No evidence of later settlements was found at the excavation site. Prior to work there was a general expectation that the excavation would reveal and document that the fortress ring was from the Viking Age and similar to the other known Viking ring fortresses. This expectation, however, was not satisfied.

All Danish fortifications used to be registered by the Danish National Museum's Department of Middle Ages even when finds, such as Borrering, were not from that age. The Museum registered the ring fortress as Borrering, and when Harald Andersen submitted an article to the magazine Skalk in 1992 in which he "dragged" the pre-Medieval fortifications out of the darkness, Borrering was consequently referred to in this version:

«Borrering, Højelse parish. Circular embankment/grave about 140 m. across, today used for farming. Find dating from early Roman times.»

«Two major fortresses on Bornholm [....], both from late Iron Age, are clearly refuges while it is less clear if this is also the case with the two remaining fortresses of this magnitude, viz. a circular fortress located just outside Køge, pottery-dated to Roman times, and [....]»

"Borrering, Højelse s. Kredsrund vold/grav, ca 140 m i diam., nu helt nedpløjet. Fund fra ældre romertid." [in Danish]

"To storborge på Bornholm [....] begge dateret til yngre jernalder, er utvivlsomt tilflugtssteder, mens det er mere usikkert, om det samme gælder de to andre anlæg, som endnu er tilbage i denne størrelsesklasse, nemlig en kredsrund borg beliggende tæt uden for Køge, skårdateret til romertid, og [....]" [in Danish]

On the difficult task of gaining a comprehensive view of pre-historic fortifications Harald Andersen wrote: "A student wishing to attain a complete overview of this material, while circumventing the archives, must traverse the entirety of Trap Danmark, where every Danish fortification is dealt with, if sparsely. While certainly not an enviable journey, it remains the only viable way". Though the description given of Borrering in Trap Danmark, 5th edition (1960) was so general and speculative that a student of Borrering around 1992 therefore had to use the actual excavation results, now in the National Museum, to learn more about the fortification.

=== Discovery ===
Some twenty years later, professor Søren Sindbæk of University of Aarhus was working on a major book on Aggersborg, when he recognized a clear pattern to the location of the other fortresses; it soon became clear that there was a fortress missing in eastern Zealand. The trelleborgs are placed a day's march apart, i.e. about 50 kilometres. This distance was also apparent between the nearest fortress Trelleborg at Slagelse and the now known trelleborg, Borgring, at Lellinge.

In 2014 (maybe just on 18 September) further archeological research by Danish Castle Centre and University of Aarhus and with some important help from Helen Goodchild from University of York showed that Borgring dates back to the 10th century. Remnants of burnt gates were also found possibly suggesting war activity of the kind found in Trelleborg at Slagelse, where nineteen arrows were found inside the fortress. Up until 2014, the location has only been mentioned a few times in literature, leaving one of the largest circular fortresses in Denmark in relative obscurity, and just in line with what is known, or not known, about the other trelleborgs.

Despite the geometric plan, the type-marker for a trelleborg, the gates of Borgring are not perfectly aligned north, east, south and west. The minor dislocation (11°) probably reflects concerns that the fortress would emerge asymmetrical in the landscape if the prevailing building principles were rigorously obeyed.

Only minor sections of the fortress have been unearthed, but excavations were scheduled to continue in 2015.

== Builder ==
Harald Bluetooth is presumed to be the master builder of the other Danish trelleborg-type fortresses, and it seems plausible that he may indeed have built the ring fortress at Lellinge, too. The fortress remains to be conclusively dated, however, rendering Harald Bluetooth's involvement likely but not proven.

== See also ==
- Aggersborg
- Borgeby Castle
- Fyrkat
- Harald Bluetooth
- Nonnebakken
- Trelleborg (Slagelse)
- Viking ring fortress
- Vikings

== Literature ==
- Harald Andersen (1992), "De glemte borge", Skalk (in Danish) (1): 19–30

Further literature on place name
Borrering

"The Danish Castle Centre and Aarhus University: Enigmatic Viking Fortress discovered in Denmark" (PDF). Archived from the original (PDF) on 6 September 2014.

Vallø Borgring

Danmarks Borgcenter: Vallø Borgring – Gådefuld vikingeborg fundet ved Køge [in Danish]
