= Ringfort =

Circular fortified settlements found in Northern Europe

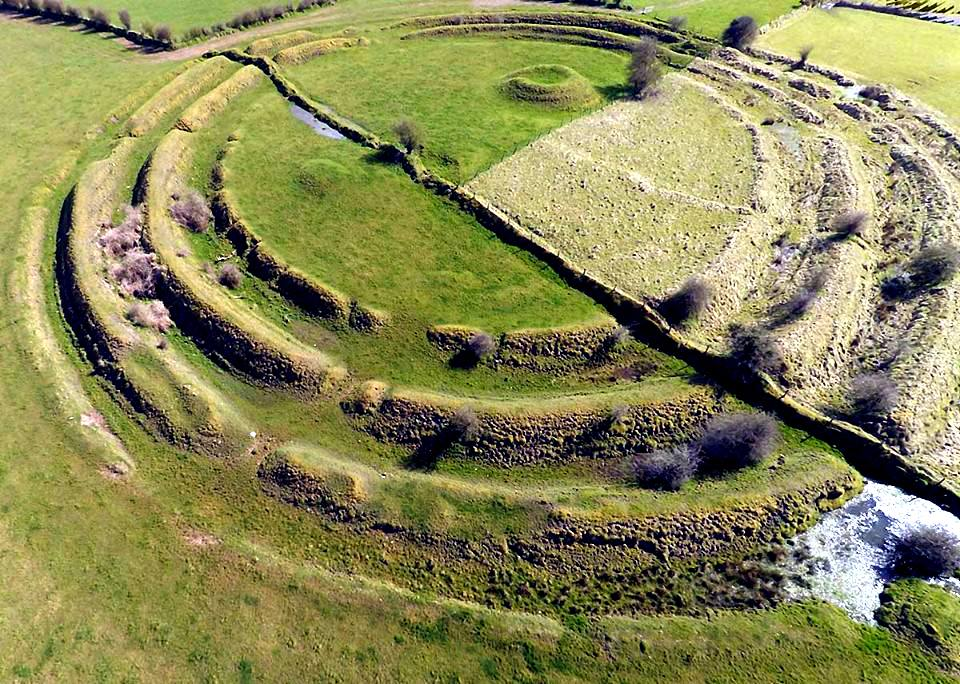
The ringfort at Rathrar in County Roscommon, Ireland

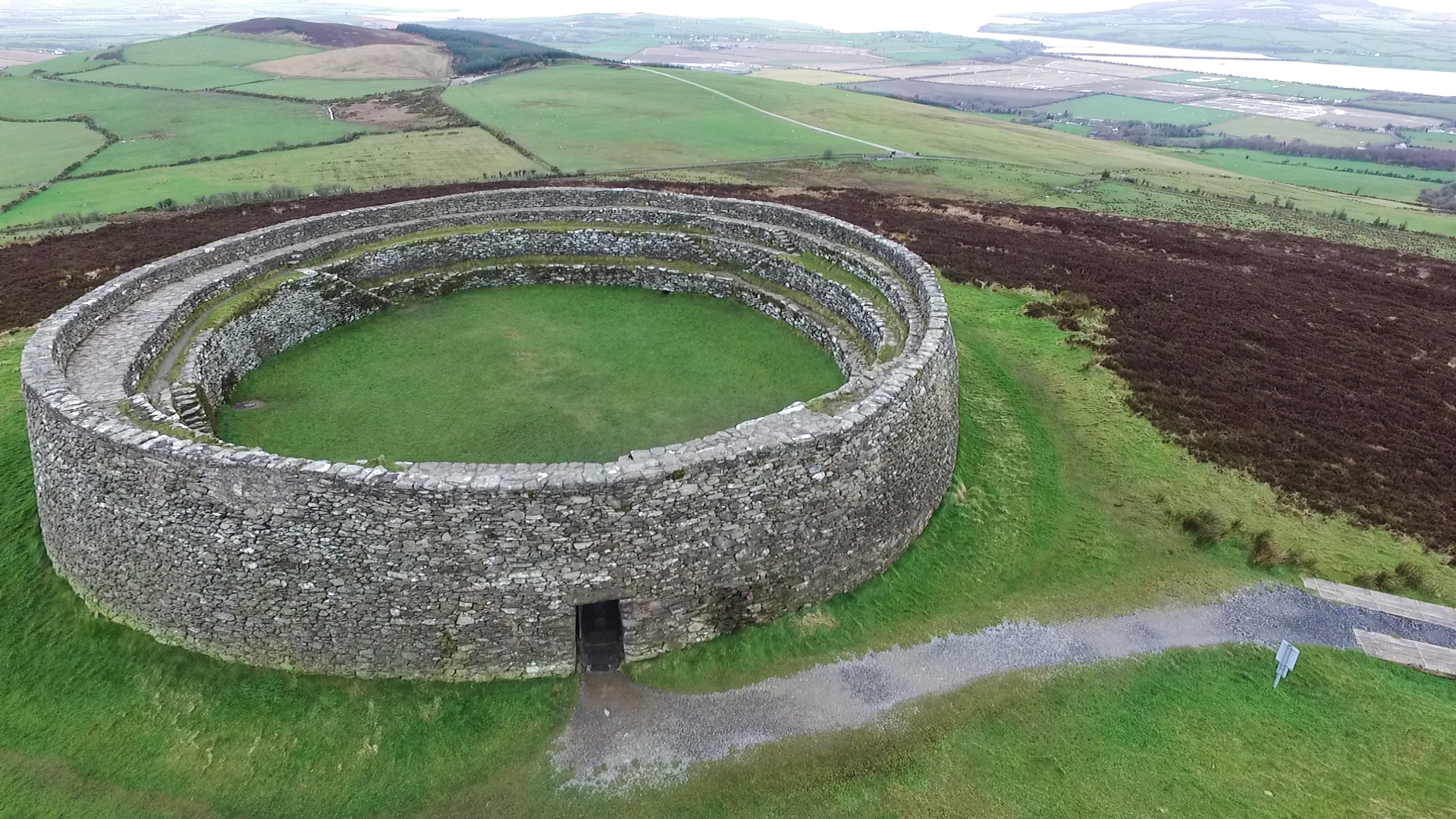
The Grianán Ailigh in County Donegal, Ireland, is one of the more impressive stone-walled ringforts.

Ringforts or ring forts are small circular fortified settlements built during the Bronze Age, Iron Age and early Middle Ages up to about the year 1000 AD. They are found in Northern Europe, especially in Ireland. There are also many in South Wales and in Cornwall, where they are called rounds. Ringforts come in many sizes and may be made of stone or earth. Earthen ringforts would have been marked by a circular rampart (a bank and ditch), often with a stakewall. Both stone and earthen ringforts would generally have had at least one building inside.

== Distribution ==
=== Ireland ===
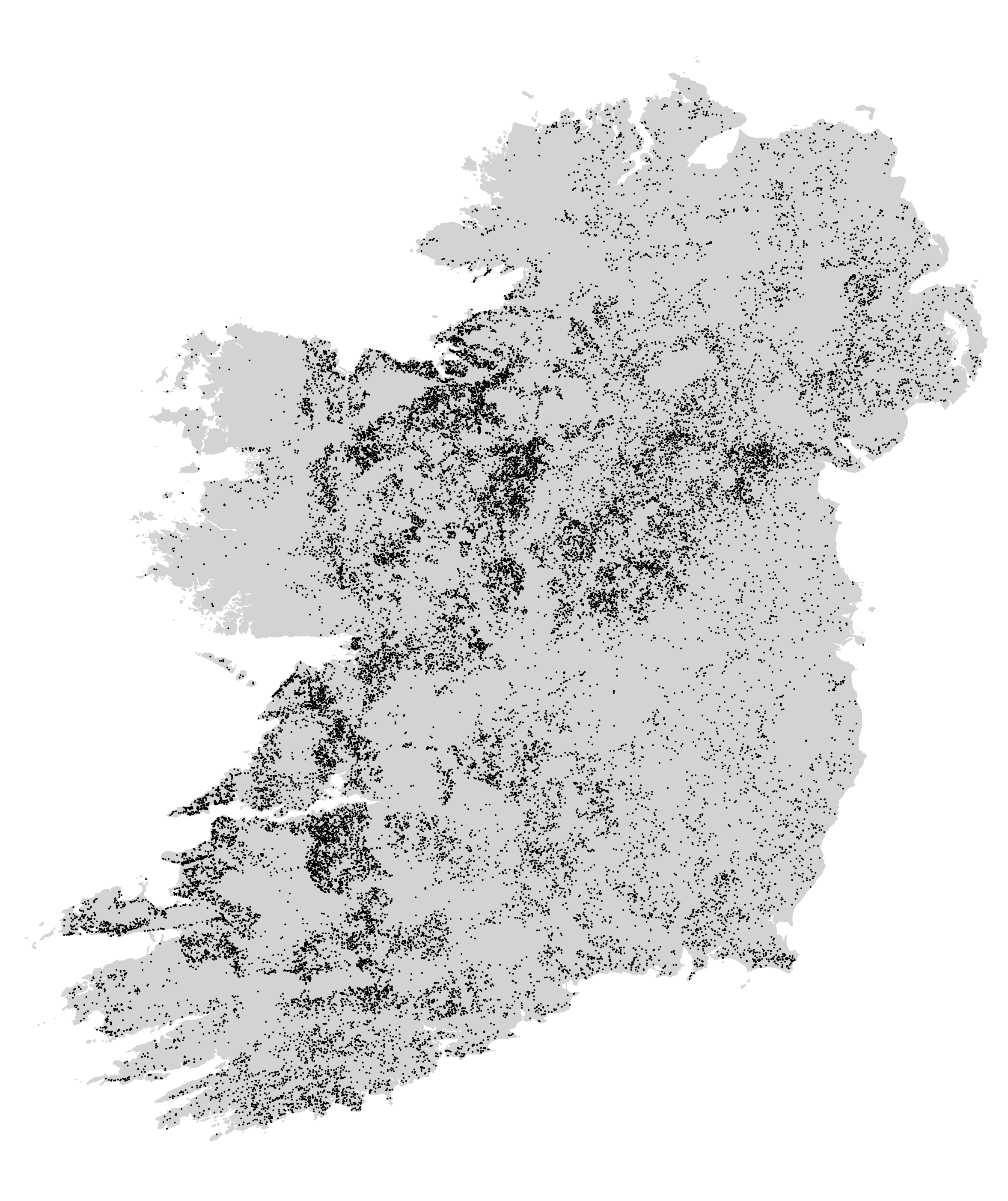
The distribution of known, surviving ringforts in Ireland

In Irish language sources they are known by a number of names: ráth (anglicised rath, also Welsh rath), lios (anglicised lis; cognate with Cornish lis), caiseal (anglicised cashel), cathair (anglicised caher or cahir; cognate with Welsh caer, Cornish and Breton ker) and dún (anglicised dun or doon; cognate with Welsh and Cornish din). The ráth and lios was an earthen ringfort; the ráth being the enclosing bank and the lios being the open space within. The caiseal and cathair was a stone ringfort. The term dún was usually used for any stronghold of importance, which may or may not be ring-shaped.

In Ireland, over 40,000 sites have been identified as ringforts and it is thought that at least 50,000 ringforts existed on the island. They are common throughout the country, with a mean density of just over one ringfort within any area of 2 km^{2} (0.8 sq mi). It is likely that many have been destroyed by farming and urbanisation. Mapping in County Cork and Waterford in 1773 showed 73 "earthworks" with only 20 recorded in 1937. However, many hitherto unknown ringforts have been found thanks to early Ordnance Survey maps, aerial photography, and the archaeological work that has accompanied road-building.

=== England and Wales ===
In Cornwall, parts of Devon, and south Wales, enclosed settlements share many characteristics with the Irish counterparts, including the circular shape and souterrains (fogous), and their continuing occupation from the Iron Age into the early medieval period; the form later influencing the distinctive circular shell-keeps found across the medieval Severnside region. Few Cornish examples have been archaeologically excavated, with the exception of Trethurgy Rounds.

=== Scandinavia ===
Hillforts are also known from Scandinavia, of which nineteen can be found on the Swedish island of Öland alone.

These hillforts are not to be confused with Viking ring fortresses, of which seven are known from Denmark and southern Sweden, all from around 980 in the Viking Age. The Viking forts all share a strikingly similar design and are collectively referred to as Trelleborgs, after the first excavated fortress of that type in 1936. All the Viking ring fortresses are believed to have been built within a very short timeframe, during the reign of Harald Bluetooth, but for yet unknown military purposes. They might have served as boot camps for Sweyn Forkbeard's men before his invasion of England in 1013.

== Chronology ==
The debate on chronology is primarily a result of the huge number of ringforts and the failure of any other form of settlement site to survive to modern times in any great quantity from the period before the Early Christian period or from Gaelic Ireland after the Anglo-Norman arrival. Three general theories mark the debate on the chronology of Irish ringforts; firstly the theory that wishes to date ringforts back into the Iron Age period; secondly, the theory that seeks to see the continuation of ringfort habitation into the later medieval and even the Modern Period; finally, the more common and generally accepted theory that ringforts were a product of the second half of the first millennium (543-991), a theory which has been given greater definition by Matthew Stout in recent years. According to the authoritative New History of Ireland (2005), "archaeologists are agreed that the vast bulk of them are the farm enclosures of the well-to-do of early medieval Ireland".

=== Theories ===
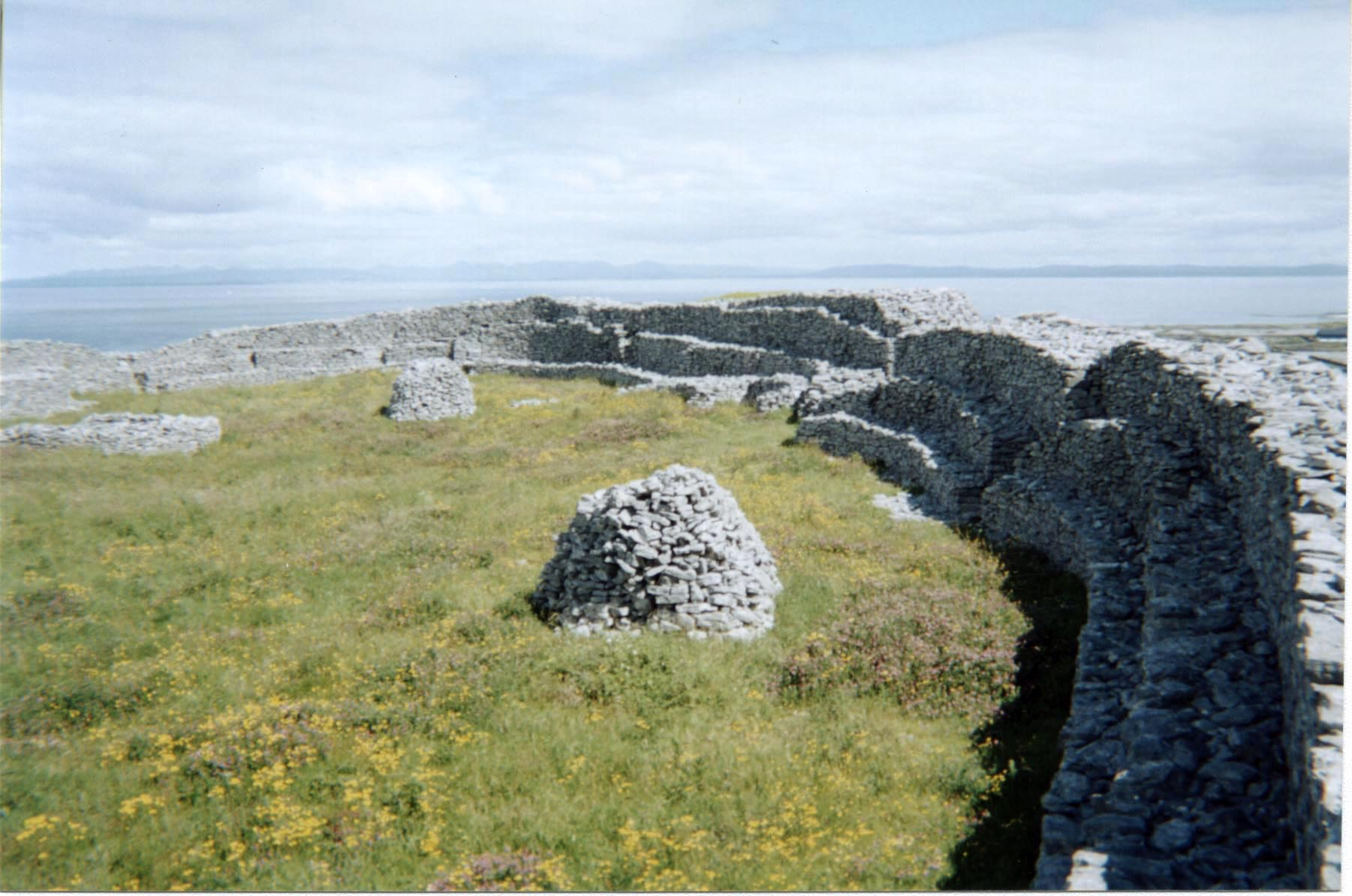
Ringfort on the island of Inishmaan, Aran Islands, Ireland

The theories that the ringfort either pre- or post-dates the Early Middle Ages in Ireland, are both based on essentially the same premise, as is highlighted here by Tadhg O'Keefe in relation to the latter argument:

The a priori case for attributing some ringforts to the Later Middle Ages... is based on the absence of any other settlement form of appropriate date in those landscapes. In other words, if the Gaelic-Irish did not live in ringforts, where did they live?

==== Dating from the Iron Age ====
The conjecture that ringforts can be seen to have evolved from and be part of an Iron Age tradition has been expanded by Darren Limbert. This hypothesis is based on a number of re-interpretations of the available evidence, as well as concern over the available evidence. As only a small portion of ringforts have undergone total excavation, and the fact that these excavations have not taken place on anything like a national level, the evidence is insufficient to place all ringforts and the origins of them within the Early Christian period.

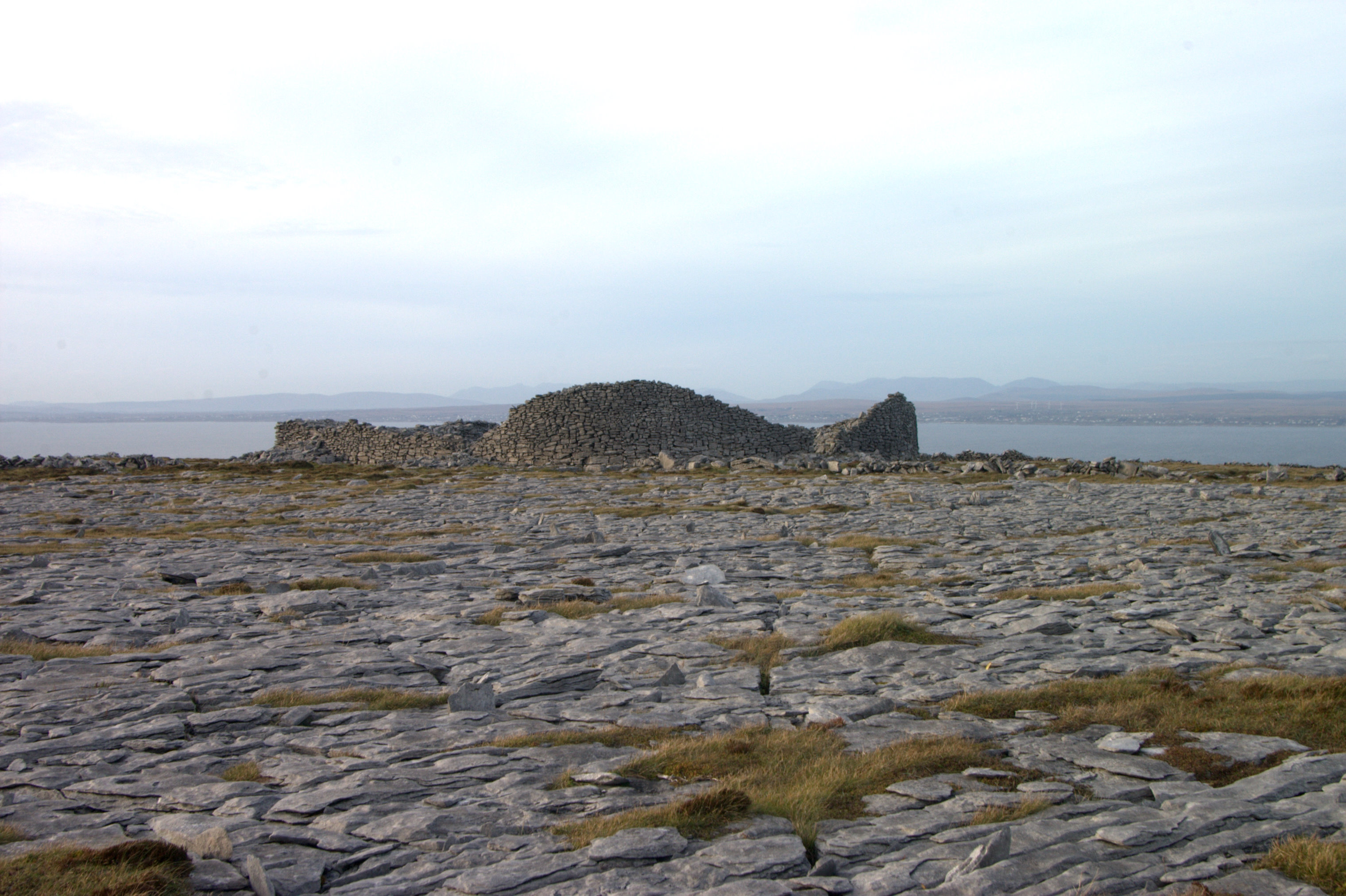
Caher on Black Head, County Clare, with karst terrain in foreground

Limbert argues instead, that the ringfort should be seen in the context of a variety of similar developments in Britain and the European Continent, particularly in Iberia and Gaul. While conceding that most ringforts were built in the Early Christian period, he suggests a link between the arrival of Eóganachta dynasty in Munster c. 400 AD, and the introduction of ringforts. In support of this he notes that: "The other major Eoganachta ringforts [other than Cashel] of Ballycatten, Garranes and possibly Garryduff, despite limited stratigraphic discernment, have produced artefacts of ambiguously early origins. Also, their defensive nature,... supports an intrusion of a Celtic warrior caste..." The similarity with South Welsh 'raths' and Cornish 'rounds' suggests a degree of cultural interaction between Western British and Irish populations, however differences in dates of occupation mean this cannot be confirmed.

On the island of Öland, Sweden, nineteen ringforts have been identified, including Eketorp, a site that has been completely excavated and that one may visit. Currently, excavations are ongoing at Sandby borg, which was the site of a massacre in the 5th century AD.

It is also possible that the Hill of Tara is an early type of ringfort.

==== Use continuing into the later medieval period ====
At the opposite end of the spectrum to this, the argument has been put forward to suggest that ringforts were in use, if not being built in the later medieval and possibly Early Modern period in Gaelic Ireland. This argument is primarily two-fold, ringforts were gradually converted into what would more generally be considered as mottes today, and there is some slight and contentious archaeological evidence that points to the habitation and construction of obvious ringforts in this later medieval period.

From a morphological viewpoint, and probably also from the view of the contemporary person, there is little to distinguish a ringfort from a small earthwork castle or motte. Indeed, in a number of cases it would appear that either the Normans converted existing ringforts into the basis of the future construction of mottes and earthworks, or that the Gaelic Irish, through the use of raised raths, sought to emulate the Norman example. Some L Plan Castles, such as Balingarry Castle in Ireland originated as ringforts.

This theory is supported by a number of excavations, most notably the results of the Castleskreen II excavation, and the raised raths at Piper's Fort, and Ballyfounder, County Limerick, which seem to have been converted into mottes in the case of Castleskreen II or in the later cases, built in imitation of such constructions. If one were to accept a defensive function for ringforts, it would seem that after the introduction of more complex forms of defensive structures into Ireland this would naturally lead to the use of ringforts and raised raths in a manner analogous to the contemporary Norman buildings.

==== 7th to 10th centuries ====
While it would seem probable that some ringforts may have seen continuation in the later medieval period as adapted or imitation mottes it seems doubtful if the continuation that ringforts were still being built on a more general scale throughout the country, and the evidence put forward for such a theory would appear quite slim. The excavations which support such a theory, most notably Rynne's excavation at Shannon Airport of Garrynamona which is suggestive of a 15th-century ringfort being constructed, have failed to win any form of widespread popular acceptance.

The most common theory however is that ringforts are the product of the later half of the first millennium, a theory that has generally been supported by the excavated evidence of the period, and one that has seen remarkable if slightly ambitious definition from Matthew Stout. In his work The Irish Ringfort, Stout has sought to use the radiocarbon and dendrochronological dates from 114 ringforts and associated sites to find an overall date pattern for the use of ringforts; and through this has placed over half of all ringforts in the period 540 AD to 884 AD with two-thirds falling within the 600 AD to 900 AD period. While this method has brought the dating of the ringfort phase of Irish history to an ever more accurate level, certain problems do exist with his analysis. Firstly, as he notes himself, the research is overly biased towards Ulster (64% of dated sites were from Ulster), and the dates come from a very small sample of sites relative to the total number of ringforts. Finally, Stout's use of radiocarbon dating is to one standard deviation, which means that there is an approximately one third chance that the data offered is inaccurate by up to 100 years on either side. Yet despite these difficulties, Stout's analysis has to a large extent brought a degree of finality to the debate of the dating and use of ringforts, with it being more or less certain that the vast majority were probably occupied and constructed in the second half of the first millennium. His analysis is further supported by Gerald of Wales who commented that ringforts in Ireland, were known as Daneforts, and that they had been abandoned by the late 12th century when he was in Ireland.

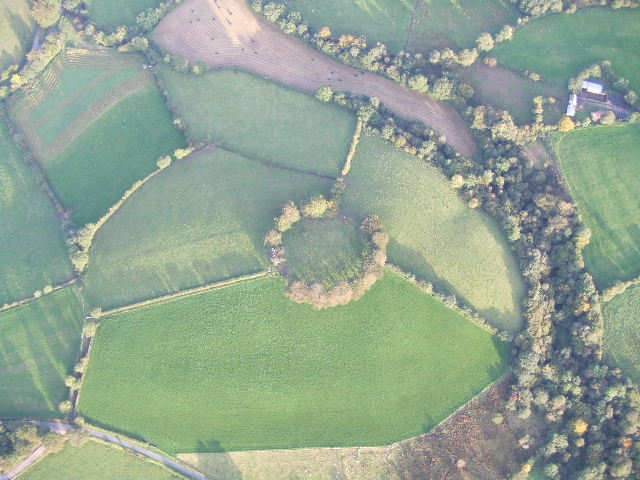
A typical ringfort incorporated into field boundaries in County Tyrone, Northern Ireland

== Functions ==
=== Agriculture ===
It has traditionally been understood that the ringfort was a dispersed farmstead, the home of a free man and his family and the centre of a mixed agricultural economy to a large extent dominated by cattle. A medieval Irish law text describes a prosperous farmer – boaire in Old Irish – as having a dwelling house, a sheep-pen, a calf-pen and a pig-sty – it would seem that these were all within the ring-fort.

Evidence suggests that not all ringforts were farmsteads, but rather that ringforts appeared to have fulfilled a variety of other functions as well. The most celebrated example of this is Garryduff II in County Cork. This ringfort which is overlooked and in close proximity to another larger ringfort, Garryduff I, has provided archaeologists with no evidence of habitation or settlement, and the pre-eminent theory at the moment is that this ringfort was possibly used as an enclosure for livestock.

However, this interpretation is still the most commonly held in academic, archaeological and popular debate, although pollen studies and other evidence have greatly modified the traditional view of the dominance of livestock as opposed to arable farming in early medieval Ireland, making it clear that cereal production was much more important than once thought in the early medieval period.

=== Industry ===
Other sites have provided evidence that ringforts may not have principally been farmsteads, but rather had a more diverse and significant role in the economy. A good example of this is provided by the large, tri-vallate ringfort in Garannes, County Cork, which offers no evidence for habitation or settlement but provides a great deal of evidence to suggest that the site had an industrial nature. Furthermore, the finds of continental pottery at the site, suggests that the site was trading with the continent and/or may have been acting as a gateway centre for similar high status goods into the local economy. Both Garannes, and especially Garryduff II, highlight the other roles that ringforts may have had in early Christian Ireland. While it would seem that most ringforts fitted the traditional explanation as farmsteads, that should not be used as a blanket explanation. A number of other functions for many of the surviving ringforts, such as those outlined above and possibly other settlement functions, still need to be considered.

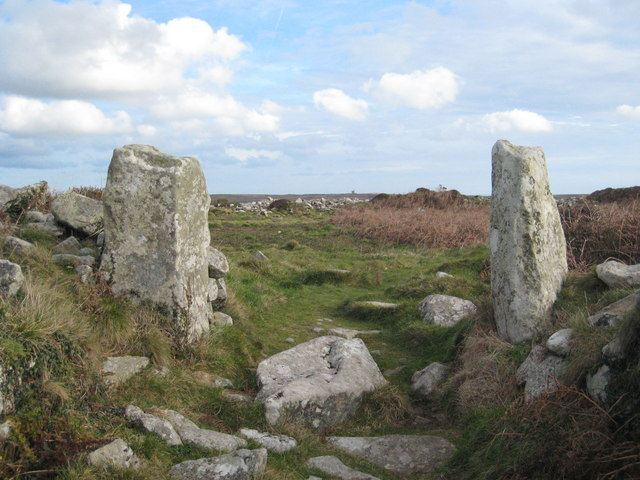
The gate of Chûn Castle in Cornwall

=== Defence ===
A ringfort is a defensive feature that would appear to be obvious both from the name with the defensive implications that fort implies, and also from the generally understood morphological definition of the ringfort, with the banks and fosse been commonly seen as defensive. Indeed, in S. Ó Ríordáin's common morphological definition, he refers to the banks and fosses of the ringfort as defences.

One presumes that the ringfort had a defensive aspect, and in a cattle-dominated society it is generally argued that the purpose of the ringfort was to provide protection to a small community and their livestock during a 'hit and run' raid for cattle, the idea being that the ringfort would provide adequate defence for a short period of time. During the early Christian period in Ireland, cattle raids were a common occurrence and ringforts would provide a level of security. This theory is strengthened by the idea of 'visual territories' which operates from the assumption that all ringfort in a region were probably occupied contemporarily, and that in a particular area one ringfort would be in the sight of at least one other neighbouring ringfort so that if one ringfort were attacked, relief would possibly come from a neighbouring one. Furthermore, a number of aspects of the generally circular nature of the ringfort highlight the defensive advantages, most notably that a circle as a shape "offered broad perspectives of approaching attackers and allowed the maximum area to be enclosed relative to the length of the bank constructed."

=== Status ===
While defence may be expanded as the modern day explanation for the surrounding banks of a ringfort, this was not the contemporary explanation, rather the explanations forthcoming from the Early Christian texts stress the importance and role of the banks in signifying nobility, kingship and authority. This relationship can be quite clearly seen in the following extract from the Críth Gablach:

What is the due of a king who is always in residence at the head of his tuath? Seven score feet of perfect feet are the measure of his stockade on every side. Seven feet are the thickness of its earthwork, and twelve feet its depth. It is then that he is a king, when ramparts of vassalage surround him. What is the rampart of vassalage? Twelve feet are the breadth of its opening and its depth and its measure towards the stockade. Thirty feet are its measure outwardly.

As can be seen from the above text, the relationship between the banks of a ringfort and vassalage is quite clear. With the argument being that the more elaborate the ringfort, usually in the forms of multiple outlying banks, the higher the status of the occupant. This emphasis on status in the function of the ringfort over that of defence would explain a number of defensive weaknesses of the ringfort. Banks, or multiples of them, would not appear to offer the best return to their builders for their defensive value in comparison to a fence or a hedge. Also, few of the ringforts where buildings have been found inside, would be able to survive a night with a herd of cattle brought inside the ringfort. Furthermore, little effort would appear to have been expended on the upkeep of ditches and fosses to prevent decay and silting. Another key difficulty with viewing the ringfort primarily as a defensive unit is the general lack of ability to fight out from the ringforts, from the top of the banks.

== Legends and folklore concerning ringforts and rounds ==
The materials used to construct ringforts frequently disintegrated over time. Tradition associated their circular remains with fairies and leprechauns, and they were called “fairy forts". Castle Pencaire on Tregonning Hill was regarded as the abode of giants. Chun Castle in Morvah is related as the home of the giant Denbras who is buried by the character Tom at Chun Quoit from oral folklore recorded by William Bottrell published 1870. Kelly Rounds (Castle Kilibury) in Triggshire is often proposed as the location of King Arthur's Celliwig, known from the Welsh poem Pa Gwr yw y Porthawr? and described in the 11th century Culhwch and Olwen. Castle Dore is often proposed as the court of King Mark (Mergh Cunomor / Marcus Cunomorus) in the romance Drustan hac Yseult, the doomed hero sailing the seas from Brittany to Ireland to seek his love.

== List of notable ringforts ==
=== Ireland ===
- Cahercommaun (Cathair Chomáin) – ringfort/promontory fort
- Caherconnell (Cathair Chonaill)
- Caherconree (Cathair Conraoi) – ringfort/promontory fort
- Caherdaniel (Cathair Dónall)
- Dún Aonghasa – ringfort/promontory fort
- Dún Dúchathair – ringfort/promontory fort
- Grianán Ailigh
- Leacanabuaile
- Lisnagade (Lios na gCead)
- Mooghaun (An Múchán)
- Mount Sandel Fort (Cill Santail)
- Staigue (An Stéig)

The royal sites of Ireland are also sometimes called ringforts, although their role seems to have been mainly ceremonial. They include:

- Uisneach (Uisnigh)
- Cruachan
- Dún Ailinne
- Navan Fort (Eamhain Mhacha)
- Tara (Teamhair)
- Tlachta
- Tullahoge (Tulaigh Óg)

=== Cornwall (Cornish rounds) ===
- Caer Bran
- Carlidnack
- Castle an Dinas
- Castle Dore
- Chûn Castle
- Helsbury Castle
- Kelly Rounds
- Penventinnie Round – well preserved circular fort
- Prideaux (Pridias)
- Tregonning – rounds associated with circular hillfort
- Trethurgy – an excavated round
- Warbstow Bury – regarded as 'one of the largest and best preserved multivallate hillforts' in Cornwall English heritage Report
- Cadson Bury, Callington – often associated with the Arthurian Celliwig

=== Denmark (Viking ring fortresses) ===
- Aggersborg
- Fyrkat
- Nonnebakken
- Trelleborg (Slagelse)

=== Sweden ===
- Eketorp
- Ismantorp
- Sandby borg – site of a preserved massacre

=== Germany ===
- Ringwall of Burg
- Ringwall of Otzenhausen

=== Estonia ===
- Valjala Stronghold
- Varbola Stronghold

== See also ==
- Circular rampart – Embankment built in the shape of a circle
- Hill fort – Fortified refuge or defended settlement on a rise of elevation
- Ringwork – Type of early castle
- Shell keep – Style of medieval fortification

== Further reading/sources ==
- GF Barrett and BJ Graham, Some considerations concerning the dating and distribution of Ring-Forts in Ireland in Ulster Journal of Archaeology, Vol. 38., 1975 pp. 33–45
- Michelle Comber, Trade and Communication Networks in Early Historic Ireland in The Journal of Archaeology, X, 2001
- Nancy Edward, The archaeology of early medieval Ireland, Batsford, London, 1996
- PJ Graham & LJ Proudfoot, An Historical Geography of Ireland, Academic Press, London, 1993
- Darren Limbert, Irish Ringforts: A review of their Origins in Archaeological Journal, 153, 1996, pp. 243–289
- CJ Lynn Some Early Ringforts and crannógs in The Journal of Irish Archaeology, I, 1983, p. 47–58
- Eoin MacNeill Ancient Irish Law: The Law of Status or Franchise" in the Royal Irish Academy, Volume XXXVI, C, 1923 pp. 365–316
- JP Mallory & TE McNeill, The Archaeology of Ulster from Colonisation to Plantation, Institute of Irish Studies, Belfast, 1991
- Tadhg O'Keefe, Medieval Ireland – An archaeology, Tempus, Gloucestershire, 2000
- MJ O'Kelly, Two Ringforts at Garryduff, Co. Cork in Proceedings of the Royal Irish Academy, 63C, 1962 pp. 17–125
- SP Ó Ríordáin The excavation of a large Earthen Ringfort at Garranes, Co. Cork in Proceedings of the Royal Irish Academy, 47C, 1942, pp. 77–150
- Matthew Stout, Early Christian Ireland: Settlement and environment in A History of Settlement in Ireland, TB Barry (ed), London, 2000, pp. 81–109
- Matthew Stout, The Irish Ringfort, Four Court Press, Dublin, 1997
- Aiden O'Sullivan, Finbar McCormick, Thomas R. Kerr, and Lorcan Harney, Early Medieval Ireland AD 400–1100: The Evidence from Archaeological Excavations, Royal Irish Academy, Dublin, 2013, 2014.
