= Jens Lauritzen =

Danish politician (born 1953)

- Born: 3 December 1953 (age 72); Nyborg, Nyborg Municipality, Denmark
- Known for: Has been Mayor of the Løgstør Municipality & Vesthimmerland Municipality.

Jens Lauritzen (born 3 December 1953) is a Danish politician who has been Mayor of the Vesthimmerland Municipality from 2006 to 2010, he is/was from Venstre.

Lauritzen is educated in agriculture. Since 1981 he has been an independent farmer, but has also worked as a supervisor in a construction company. He began his political career as a member of Løgstør Municipal Council in Løgstør in 1986. He became mayor of Løgstør Municipality in 1998. When the municipality in 2006 was merged with neighboring municipalities as a result of the municipal reform, he became the first mayor of the new Vesthimmerland Municipality. In addition to his political posts, Jens Lauritzen has had several board posts, including In Aalborg Airport and in Himmerland's Cooperative Agriculture Associations. He has 3 children with Birthe Lauritzen, one of whom is parliamentary member Karsten Lauritzen.
