= Løgstør Municipality =

Coordinates: 56°58′0″N 9°15′0″E

Løgstør Municipality Løgstør Kommune
- Former municipalities of Denmark
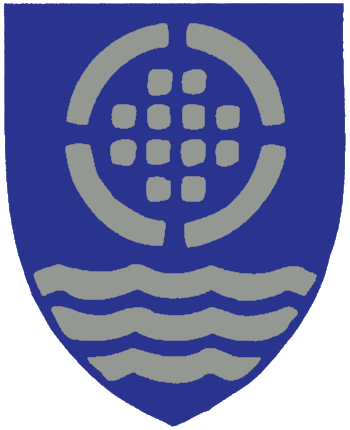
- Interactive map of Løgstør Municipality
- Country: Denmark
- Region: Region of North Jutland
- Seat: Løgstør

Government
  - Mayor: Jens Lauritzen Last

Area
  - Total: 217.99 km^{2} (84.17 sq mi)
- Time zone: UTC1 (CET)
  - Summer (DST): UTC2 (CEST)

Løgstør Municipality (Danish: Løgstør Kommune) was a municipality in Region Nordjylland on the Jutland Peninsula in northern Denmark. The municipality, including the island of Livø, covered an area of 218 km^{2} (84 sq mi), and had a total population of 10,270 (2005). Its last mayor was Jens Lauritzen, a member of the Venstre (Liberal Party) political party.

A bridge connects the former municipality near Tolstrup to the town of Aggersund on the far side of the Agger Strait.

The island of Livø lies off the former municipality's western shores, and is partially a protected nature reserve.

On 1 January 2007, Løgstør municipality ceased to exist as a result of Kommunalreformen ("The Municipality Reform" of 2007). It was merged with Farsø, Aalestrup, and Aars municipalities, to form the new Vesthimmerland municipality, with an area of 815 square kilometres (315 sq mi) and a total population of 39,176 (2005).

== Shield of Løgstør Municipality ==
The former municipality's shield was a purple/blue shield. The arms were officially registered in 1984. The main part of the arms symbolises the Viking fortress in Aggersund, a ring fortress with 12 barracks. The waves symbolise the Aggersund, the part of the Limfjord that divides the municipality into two parts. Before 1984 the municipality used the arms of the town of Løgstør, designed in 1900.

=== Mayor ===
Period	Name	Party
1970–1974	Henrik Worm Nielsen	Venstre
1974-1987	Christian Mejdahl	Venstre
1987-1990	Karl Laut	Venstre
1990-1998	Leif Højbjerg	Socialdemokratiet
1998-2007	Jens Lauritzen	Venstre
