= Borgeby Castle =

Castle in southern Sweden

- Borgeby slott
- Lomma Municipality
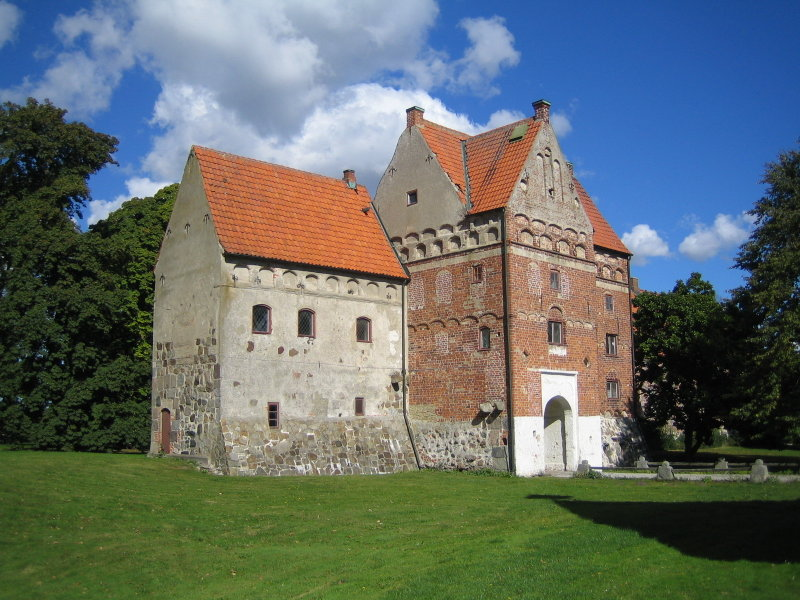
- Borgeby Castle

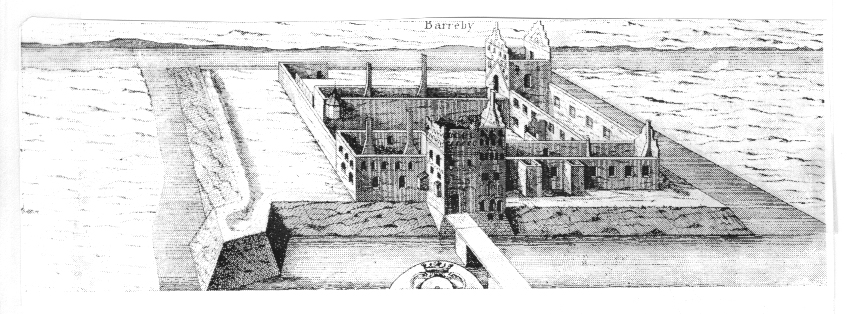
- Borgeby Castle in 1680

Site information
- Type: Castle
- Open to the public: Yes

Location
- Scania, Sweden
- Coordinates: 55.751389°N 13.036667°E

Site history
- Built: 12th century

Borgeby Castle (Swedish: Borgeby slott) lies in Lomma Municipality, Scania in southern Sweden, beside the Kävlingeån, the largest river in Scania.

== History ==
The castle is built on the site of an 11th-century castle or fortress. Finds at the site may relate to the reign of King Harald Bluetooth. It may be reconstructed similarly to the Trelleborg type with a diameter of 150 metres. Construction must have been in several phases with two separate ditches. The buildings on the site burned down during the Viking Age. Excavations in 1998 found evidence of a mint. This is thought to prove that this site belonged from its beginnings until 1536 to the Archbishop of Lund.

The buildings have been changed over the centuries. Börjes Tower was probably built in the 15th century. The tower stands alone since the eastern wing was demolished in 1860 and renovated in 1870. The gatehouse appears to be from the 16th century but has older parts. The main building of today was built between 1650 and 1660. The stable was built of bricks in 1744.

According to the testament of the archbishop Karl Eriksen († 1334) horses were bred on the grounds during the 14th century. The castle was burned in 1452 by the Swedes and in 1658 by the Danes. Excavation findings also suggest it was burnt in the 16th century though there is nothing to be found in the records. This may have been during the farmers' revolt of 1525.

Several Danish and Swedish aristocratic families have resided in the castle since the Reformation. King Christian III of Denmark mortgaged the property to Jørgen Kock († 1556), the aristocratic Mayor of Malmö.

In 1886, the manor was acquired by Lars Pehrsson at an auction. Borgeby Manor was taken over by his daughter Hanna Larsdotter (1866-1953) and her husband, artist Ernst Norlind (1877-1952). Lomma municipality became owner in 2007 and in 2012 the castle was sold to Borgeby slott AB.

== Norlind Museum ==
Norlind Museum (Norlindmuseet) at Borgeby is an art museum which also includes Ernst Norlind's studio and gallery. The Hanna and Ernst Norlind Foundation opened the museum in 1988. The museum is managed by Kulturen in Lund.

== Other sources ==
- Fredrik Svanberg: Vikingatiden i Skåne. Lund 2000.
- Sven Rosborn: Borgeby. Medeltidsborgen vid Lödde å. Malmö 1986.
