= Aggersund =

- Village
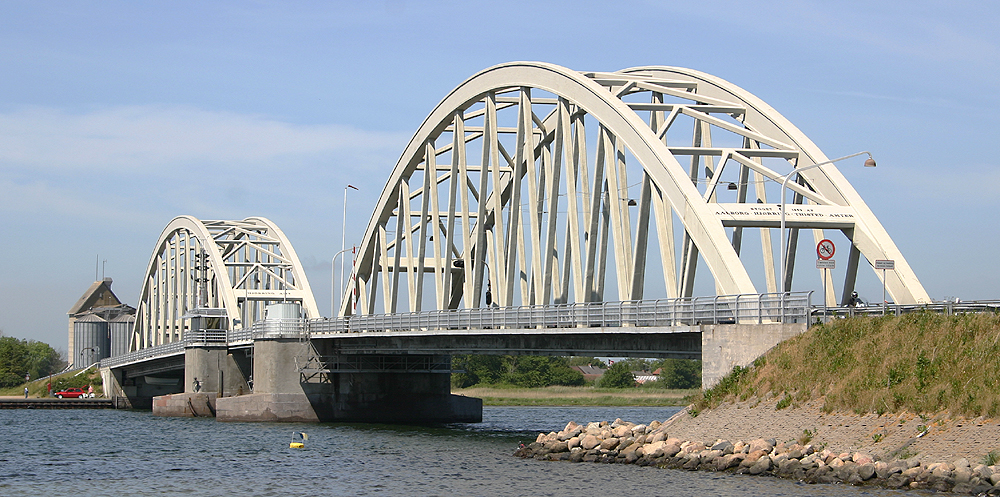
- Aggersund bridge (Aggersundbroen)

- Location within Denmark Location within North Jutland Region
- Coordinates: 57°00′N 9°18′E
- Country: Denmark
- Region: North Jutland Region
- Municipality: Vesthimmerland Municipality

Area
  - Total: 0.4 km^{2} (0.15 sq mi)

Population (2026)
  - Total: 242
  - Density: 710.8/km^{2} (1,841/sq mi)
- Website: www.aggersund.dk

Aggersund is a village in northern Denmark with a population of 242 (2026). The village is a part of Vesthimmerland Municipality in the North Jutland Region.

Evidence of settlement in Aggersund dates back to the stone age, and the village contains one of the oldest Viking fortresses in Denmark, Aggersborg. Much of the village's modern growth is associated with the commerce brought by the village's bridge. The Aggersund bridge (Danish: Aggersundbroen) was once one of few crossings on the Limfjord. Because of the bridge's regional importance, it was a location of interest during the German occupation of Denmark and had a heavy occupying military presence during WWII.

== History ==
There is evidence of a Stone Age settlement near Aggersund, from c. 5000 BCE. The remains of this settlement are located slightly north of the present day village, apparently because the strait of the fjord which it is located on was then significantly wider. During the Iron Age, a larger village emerged on the site. This village was torn down, likely to make room for the grounds of Aggersborg, a viking ring fortress, which was likely erected c. 980. Some archaeologist postulate that the displaced residents of this viking era village resettled in Øster Ørbæk on the southern bank on the fjord.

An 11th century estate adjoins the viking ring fortress. It was formed in 1086 as a royal estate, owned by the crown. The original buildings were destroyed by a fire in the 15th century, and were not rebuilt. The estate then briefly became known as Kongensgaard, which retained its rights over Aggersund as a fief. The estate was sold by the crown in 1579 to Vibeke Podebusk, who then constructed a new manor house on the property called Aggersborggaard. The estate's main building was constructed during the 1750s from salvaged architectural elements from several older sites. Several restorations of the property have been carried out since the 20th century. The main building itself was restored in 1936 and rebuilt in 1978.

The village was traditionally a part of Hanherred, historically referred to as Hanæhæreth. The herred was an independent fief during the later middle ages, though alternately belonged to the Syssels of Thysyssel and Vendsyssel. In the 1660s, Hanherred was divided between several counties of Denmark: Aalborg County, Aastrup County, Sejlstrup County, and Thisted County. The village of Aggersund became part of Hjørring County in 1793 and constituted the administrative parish of Aggerborg Sogn. Although the majority of the village was settled along the northern shore of the Limfjord, by this time Aggersund was divided by the fjord, and a ferry crossed from North Aggersund to South Aggersund. The southern part of the village was part of a separate administrative district within Slet Herred of Aalborg County.

Modern settlement of the area centered around the ferry port, which made the location an important commercial crossroad. In 1801 Aggerborg Sogn had a population of 373, which grew to 545 in 1859. At this point in time, the economy relied largely on farming and trade with Aalborg of grains, potatoes, and livestock. While the area had once supported a fishing industry, it was a declining profession in the region by this time and yields were only traded locally. By 1901, the sogn's population peaked at 856. While the population of the sogn began to decline in the early 20th century, Aggersund itself continued to expand. In 1955, the village had a population of 475, and had many amenities and industrial works. Approximately 36% of the population was employed in industrial work, 24% in trade and transportation, and 8% in agriculture. The population of the village has since declined. This is due, in part, to the 1970 Danish Municipal Reforms, which amalgamated and moved many administrative jobs and associated businesses to Løgstør.

During the German occupation of Denmark, the village saw a heavy military presence, because of the strategic importance of its bridge. Beginning in 1940, several buildings were occupied for military purposes, including the hotel at Brogade 17, which was used as a headquarters. Unemployed workers from larger cities were recruited to carry out military construction in the city. Households within the city were required to provide accommodation to these workers. On land, both sides of the village were surrounded by armoured trenches, including barbed wire fences, a minefield, and roadblocks. 18 bunkers were built within the city to protect the bridge itself, 7 on the southern side, and 11 in the north. The village became like a military fortress, and movement within the city was difficult for residents. At its peak, more than 600 men were stationed in Aggersund. By 1944, many of these soldiers had been sent to the Eastern front. Occupying forces left the village after the war ended in 1945. The military infrastructure of the city was rapidly abandoned. Grenades, land mines and other equipment were left where they lay. A long process to demilitarize the village then began.

== Infrastructure ==
A ferry had been established at Aggersund to cross the strait since the early Middle Ages. During this era, it was a major commercial crossing of the Limfjord, along with Aalborg. The ferry route remained in place for many years, though the boats grew reportedly dilapidated. In 1891 the town of Løgstør, located near the southern bank of the strait, petitioned with the state to improve the crossing and increase the flow of business. The state agreed to provide 285,000 DKK to establish a steam ferry and the construction of ferry slips in North Aggersund, South Aggersund, and Løgstør. In the agreement, the city of Løgstør was responsible for all other expenses. The new steam powered ferry, dubbed "Aggersund" was dedicated in 1902. Although the ferry greatly improved the crossing, it ran an annual deficit. As a result, the postal service took over operation of the ferry in 1918.

=== Aggersund bridge ===
Proposals for a fixed crossing of the fjord began circulating in the 1920s. There was debate over whether to build a bridge, tunnel, dam, or pontoon bridge. In 1938, it was ultimately decided to construct a fixed bridge across the strait, connecting North Aggersund to South Aggersund. The Aggersund bridge was designed by Christian Ostenfeld and construction began in 1939. Construction of the bridge cost about 3.5 million DKK and was initially funded by Aalborg, Hjørring and Thisted Counties. The project was delayed due to shortages in steel, severe weather, and price increases.

After Operation Weserübung, construction continued during the German occupation of Denmark. The location of the bridge made it strategically important to occupying forces for the transportation of soldiers and materials. On 18 June 1942, the bridge was inaugurated. German forces constructed an armoured trench and 18 bunkers, evidently guarding the location against attacks from the north. The steam ferry was also maintained during this period, in case the bridge were to be sabotaged, or otherwise destroyed. All of the military infrastructure from WWII was decommissioned after occupation ended in 1945, and the majority was removed shortly thereafter. Only one of the 18 bunkers constructed remains in the city to this day, although it has not been maintained.

Today, the Aggersund bridge is a small bascule bridge spanning the Limfjord between Vesthimmerland and Jammerbugt in Denmark. In 1977, two free standing steel truss pylons were completed across the strait just east of the Aggersund bridge (Aggersundbroen). They constitute part of the HVDC Cross-Skagerrak line and are 70 metres tall. In 2000, the bridge's beams were strengthened, increasing the carrying capacity of the bridge.

== Gallery ==
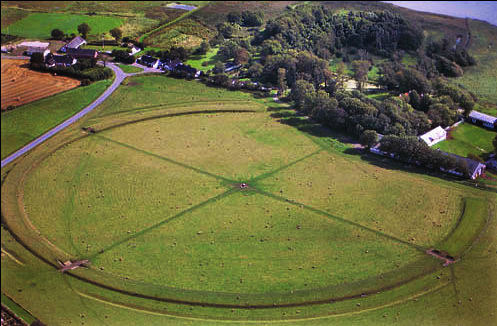
Aggersborg ring fortress with Aggersborggaard on upper right part of the circle.

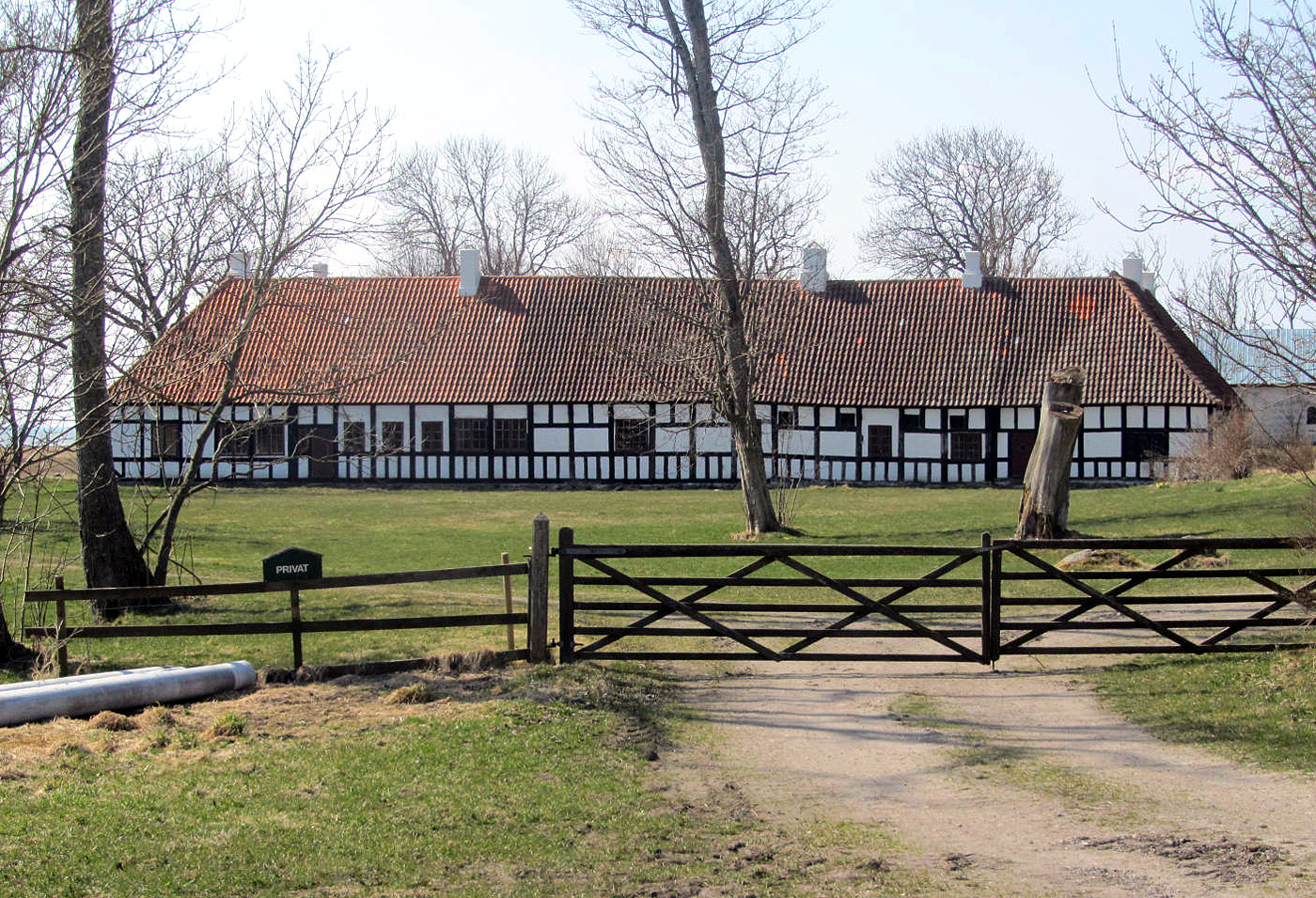
Aggersborggaard estate seen from the east.

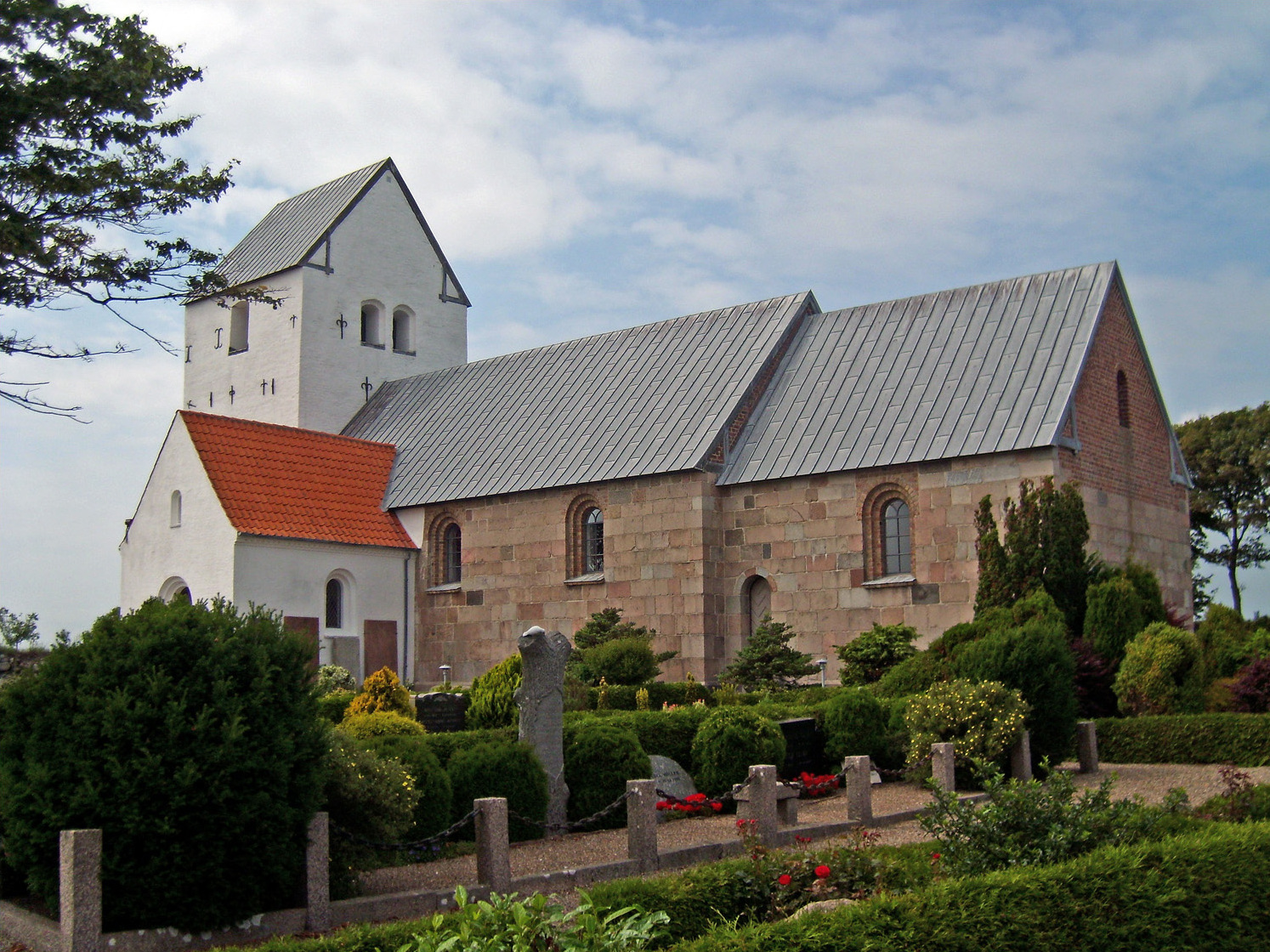
Aggersborg Church.

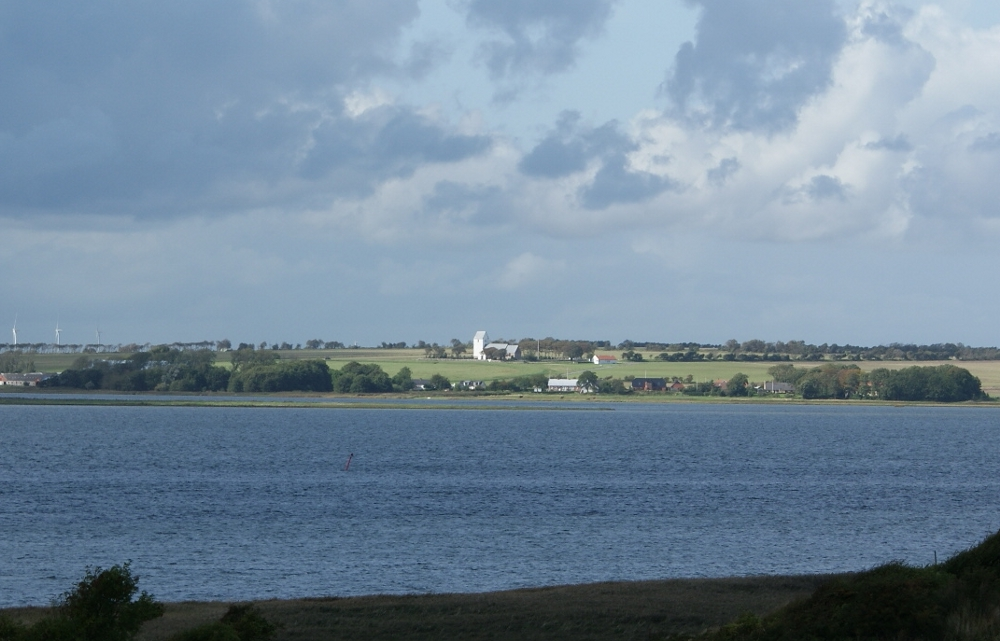
Aggersborg Church seen from Løgstør.
