= Viking ring fortress =

Type of circular fort built in Scandinavia in the Viking Age

Viking-Age Ring Fortresses
UNESCO World Heritage Site
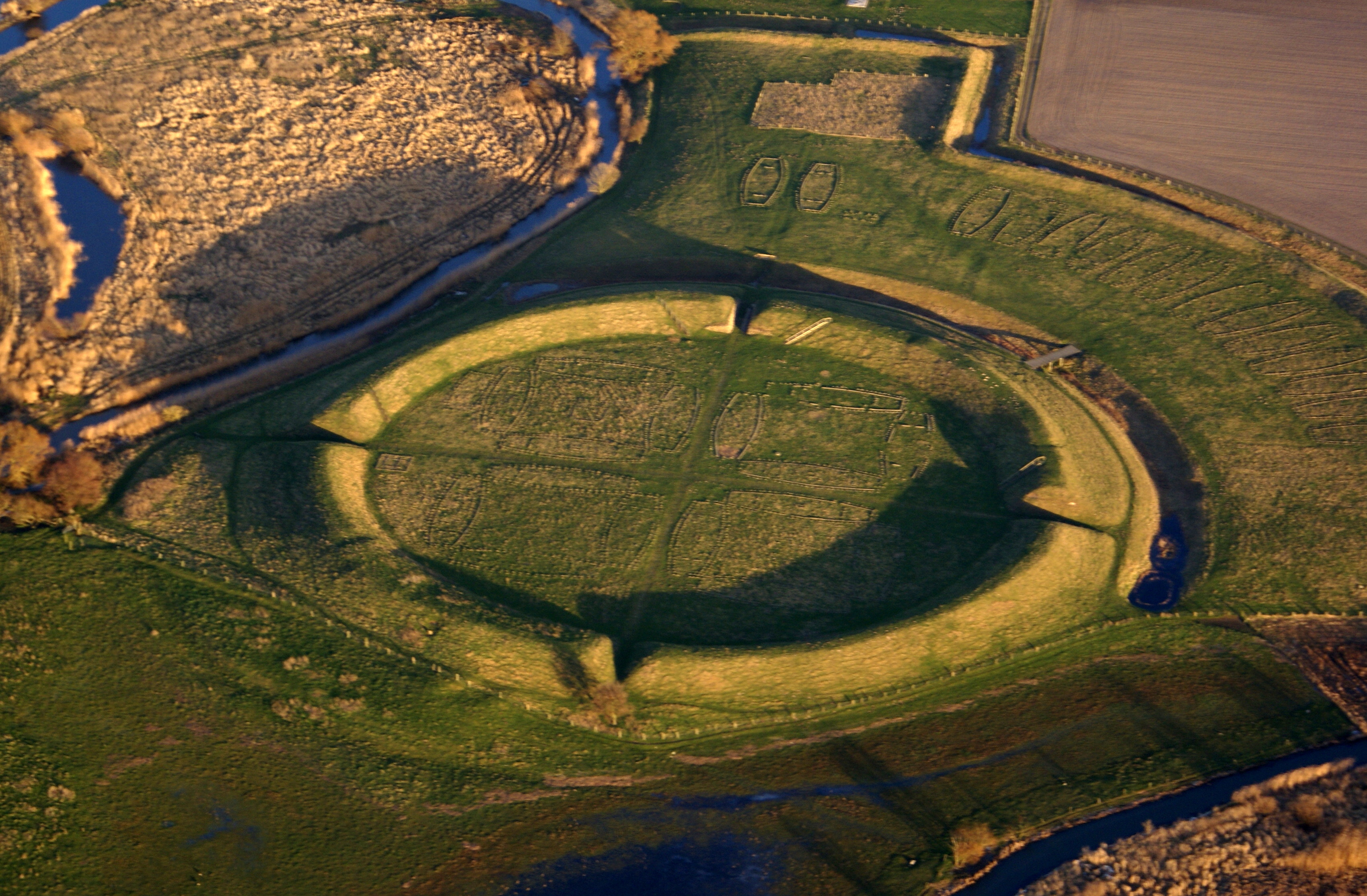
- Aerial view of the Viking ring fortress of Trelleborg, near Slagelse in Denmark. This was the first discovered Viking ring fortress, and the geometry is clearly visible.
- Includes: Aggersborg, Fyrkat, Nonnebakken, Trelleborg, and Borgring
- Criteria: Cultural: iii, iv
- Reference: 1660
- Inscription: 2023 (45th Session)
- Area: 51 ha (130 acres)
- Buffer zone: 16,820.8 ha (41,565 acres)

A Viking ring fortress, Trelleborg-type fortress, or trelleborg (pl. trelleborgs), is a type of circular fort of a special design, built in Scandinavia during the Viking Age. These fortresses have a strictly circular shape, with roads and gates pointing in the four cardinal directions. Inside the fort, each quadrant has one, in a single case four, square blocks of longhouses, completing the geometric symmetry. There are a total of five confirmed Viking ring fortresses at present, located in Denmark (although sites in Sweden and across Northern Europe have similar construction). They have been dated to the reign of Harold Bluetooth of Denmark, with an estimated near contemporary time of construction c. 980. Their exact historical context is subject to debate. In 2023, the five Danish forts were inscribed on the UNESCO World Heritage List because of their unique architecture and testimony to the military power of the Jelling Dynasty.

== Etymology ==
This specific type of fortification was named after the first discovered example: Trelleborg near Slagelse, excavated in the years 1936-1941. Historically, the name trelleborg has been translated and explained as ″a fortress built by slaves″, since the Old Norse word for slave was thrall (The modern word is træl in Danish and träl in Swedish) and borg means fortress or city. The word trel (pl. trelle) is also a plausible explanation as it relates to the wooden staves which covered both sides of the protective circular walls.

== History ==
At the end of the 10th century Harold Bluetooth vied with tribal Saxons, the Holy Roman Empire—at that time governed by the (integrated) Saxon Ottonian house—and the Slavic Abodrit and Veleti tribes for the control of the southern region of the Jutland peninsula, This area was also the very same region presumed to have been the ancient homelands of the Angles. Harald also had to contend with Norse people exercising coastal raids. At the Firth of Schlei lay Hedeby, known in the contemporary literary sources as Schleswig, where the Danevirke complex of fortifications stretched across the foot of the peninsula, holding back the hostile hosts from entering the territory, as well as providing a safe trade route via Ejderen from the North Sea coastline into Hedeby and the Baltic Sea.

The entire complex of fortifications, bridges and roads, including Ravninge Bridge on the land route towards Jelling, are presumed to have been in the hands of Harold. The fortresses establish a string of strategic points stretching from Aggersborg at the north of Jutland southward across Funen to end in Borgring at the east coast of Zealand. They have been dated to the reign of Harold Bluetooth, who held sway until c. 985, where he was ousted by his son Sweyn Forkbeard, who eventually conquered the Anglo-Saxon kingdom of Æthelred the Unready some years later. This is the apex of the Jelling dynasty, its patristic line ending the year 1042 with Harthacnut, son of Cnut the Great, son of Sweyn.

Fortifications of a similar shape and date have been found around other old towns in Scandinavia, including Borgeby, Trelleborgen, and Helsingborg in Skåne, Sweden, near Aarhus in Jutland, and Rygge, Norway Other, similar forts across Northern Europe include the Walcheren forts in Friesland (built in the outskirts of the Carolingian Empire, with a similar street orientation), and Warham Camp in England, but these are not considered Viking ring forts as they were likely built at different periods in time.

The precise purpose of the fortresses is unknown. Some historians argue that they functioned as military barracks or training grounds by Sweyn Forkbeard. However, it is more likely that they were intended as defensive strongholds along strategic trade points and/or administrative outposts of the budding state. Søren Sindbæk has offered the hypothesis that the fortresses allowed local populations to seek shelter within the fortress walls against an enemy while waiting for assistance from friendly forces from afar; this means that the fortresses helped Harold Bluetooth to control vast territory and send his army to a particular part of his territory without worrying that the undefended parts would be conquered or plundered. Others have debated whether the fortresses were defensive structures, military strongholds, or primarily served as barracks, as well as the economic, religious, and symbolic significance of the fortresses.

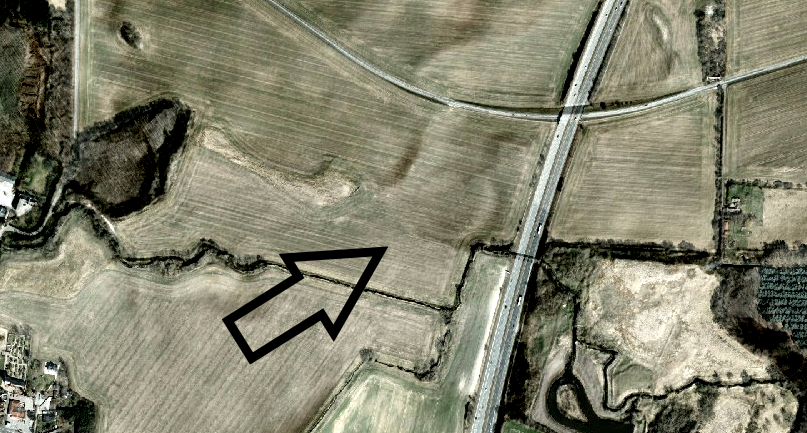
Satellite image showing the ring outline of Borgring on the landscape, which at the time was obscured by farmland (it has subsequently been partially re-established)

The fortresses were soon abandoned and never mentioned in the literary sources, effectively creating the enigma now known as trelleborge (Danish plural of 'trelleborg'). Nonnebakken was enveloped by the near contemporary municipal bishopric of Odense, while the rest receded into the landscape. The modern discovery of these sites began in the 1930s, with the excavation of Trelleborg in Denmark. Since then, a total of five sites have been officially accepted as Viking ring fortresses.

During the royally funded research project Kongens Borge (The Kings Castles), in 2010, Denmark applied for the admission of Trelleborg, Fyrkat and Aggersborg as The Trelleborg Fortresses as a UNESCO World Heritage cultural property, It is rumoured, that Denmark and Sweden, perhaps around that time, applied for admission of the Viking ring fortresses, but the records available at the World Heritage Centre cannot confirm that any Swedish ring fortresses were ever mentioned. The five trelleborge presently known became the Viking-Age Ring Fortresses World Heritage Site in 2023.

== List of Viking ring fortresses ==
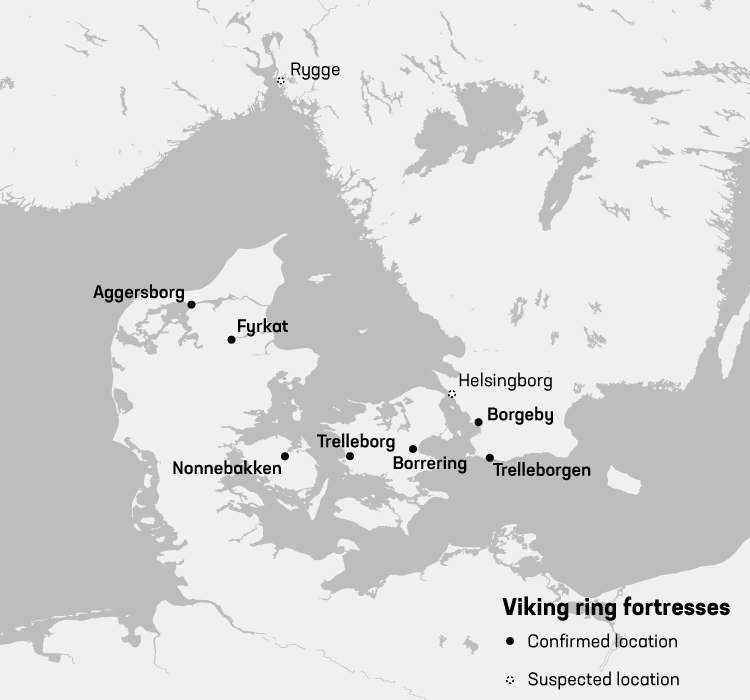
Map of Viking ring fortresses

- Aggersborg near Aggersund, Denmark.
- Borgring near Køge, Denmark.
- Fyrkat near Hobro, Denmark.
- Nonnebakken in Odense, Denmark.
- Trelleborg near Slagelse, Denmark.

Suspected

- Borgeby north of Lund, Skåne, Sweden.
- Helsingborg, Skåne, Sweden.
- Trelleborgen, Skåne, Sweden.

== Fortification typology ==
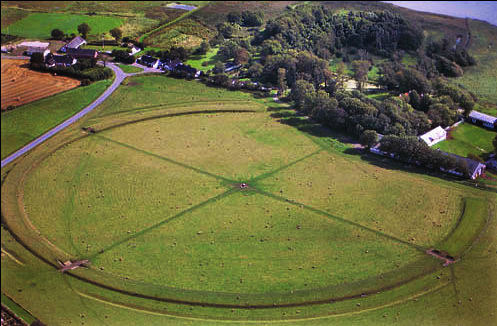
Aerial view of the Viking ring fortress of Aggersborg. The similarity in design with Trelleborg near Slagelse, is clearly evident.

The trelleborgs had similar design, "perfectly circular with gates opening to the four corners of the earth, and a courtyard divided into four areas which held large houses set in a square pattern." They differ clearly from other fortifications in that region because of their geometrical plan, though they do have some similarities with the Frankish forts at Walcheren. A short exposé over early Viking camps in Scandinavia, by Arjen Heijnis, has turned the picture around, marking out these earlier camps "fundamentally different from later defensive structures (ie. the early castles)."

Another characteristic of the ring fortresses of Trelleborg type is their internal features, consisting of axial roads running between the four gates, a ring road running around the inner side of the rampart and the aforementioned four “squares” with blocks of buildings. One of the aims of the excavation in 2015 was to undertake a specific search for these blocks of buildings, […] But as in the earlier excavations, it did not prove possible to locate the blocks of buildings and the axial roads in 2015 (figure 11). […] the collective archaeological findings at the present state of knowledge suggest that these structures never existed in the fortress. This conclusion receives further support from the fact that blocks of buildings and axial roads have not, as yet, been found at the newly excavated Borgring fortress either, and they are also missing from the fortresses in Scania […]

— Runge 2018, p. 49

The fortresses are sometimes partially encircled by advanced ramparts, though not always circular. It has been said the trelleborgs were measured with the Roman foot and that the pointed bottom of the moats is a Roman trait.

Dating by dendrochronology has found the wood used for the construction of Trelleborg to have been felled in the autumn of 980 and thus being used for building presumably in the spring of 981. The findings indicate a short construction time with no signs of maintenance, leading to the interpretation of only a short use of the buildings, maybe five years but hardly more than twenty. Fyrkat may be a little older, Aggersborg somewhat younger. 2014 brought a corresponding date to Borgring (end of 10th century), and, in 2019, following the geo-radar survey and subsequent excavation, Nonnebakken also was dated to c. 980. In the 2021 application to UNESCO, all five Danish trelleborgs appear with dates between 970 and 980. Some say the material found at Nonnebakken, Borgring, and the Scandian forts is not suffient for a precise dating. However, the layout of the trelleborgs in their local settings are so similar that it is probable that they were also functionally associated.

At the turn of the century much debate had surrounded the ring fortresses, particularly with emphasis on whether or not to add Nonnebakken to the list of recognized trelleborgs. Nonnebakken was accepted as late as 2017, though at that time the archaeologist Mads Runge concluded there were no signs of buildings inside the rampart. When geo-radar technology was applied the following year, evidence of structures inside the fort was found, affirming the site's classification as a Viking ring fortress.

Name	Inner diameter	Rampart width	Number of houses	Length of houses	Position	Year of discovery	Year of construction
Aggersborg	240 m (790 ft)	11 m (36 ft)	48	32 m (105 ft)	56°59′44″N 9°15′18″E		975–980
Borgeby	150 m (490 ft)	15 m (49 ft)			55°45′05″N 13°02′12″E	1997	
Borgring	122 m (400 ft)	10–11 m (33–36 ft)			55°28′11″N 12°7′19″E	2014 (1875)	
Fyrkat	120 m (390 ft)	13 m (43 ft)	16	28.5 m (94 ft)	56°37′24″N 9°46′14″E	1950	980
Nonnebakken	120 m (390 ft)				55°23′32″N 10°23′17″E	1953	980–1000
Trelleborg	136 m (446 ft)	19 m (62 ft)	16 (30)	29.4 m (96 ft)	55°23′39″N 11°15′55″E	1936	981
Trelleborgen	112 m (367 ft)				55.3762°N 13.1476°E	1988	c. 800

== Gallery ==
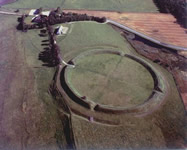
Aerial image of Fyrkat

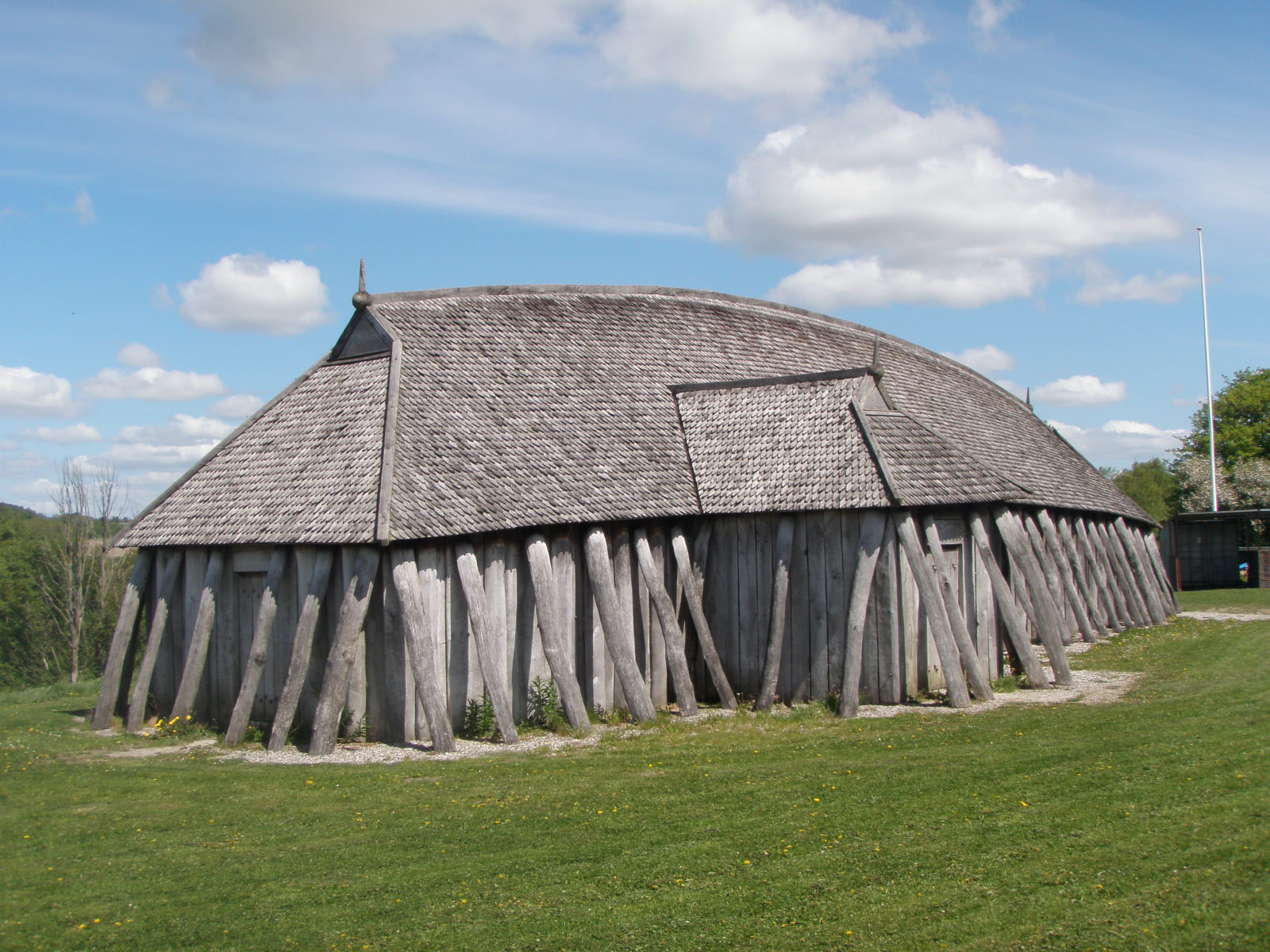
Recreation of a typical building at Fyrkat

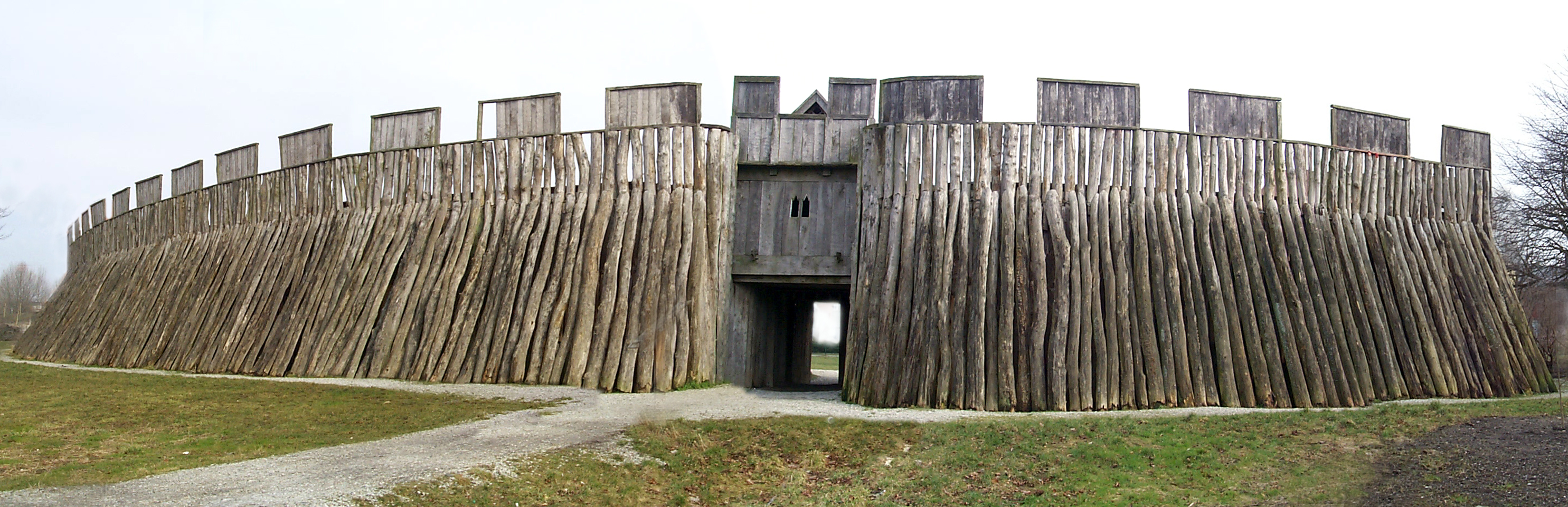
Recreation of the fortress walls at Trelleborg

== See also ==
- Eketorp
- Circular rampart

== Sources ==
- Brown, Hannah; Goodchild, Helen; Sindbæk, Søren M. (2014). "Making Place for a Viking Fortress. An archaeological and geophysical reassessment of Aggersborg, Denmark". Internet Archaeology. 36 (36). doi:10.11141/ia.36.2.
- Christensen, Jonas; Holm, Nanna; Schultz, Maja K.; Sindbæk, Søren M.; Ulriksen, Jens (2018), "The Borgring Project 2016–2018: Investigating the 5th geometrical Viking-age ring fortress in Denmark", in Hansen, Jesper; Bruus, Mette (eds.), The Fortified Viking Age. 36th Interdisciplinary Viking Symposium, Kulturhistoriske studier i centralitet - Archaeological & Historical Studies in Centrality, vol. 3, Odense City Museums, University Press of Southern Denmark, pp. 60–68, ISBN 9788740832129
- Dobat, Andres Siegfried (2009). "The State and the Strangers: The Role of External Forces in a Process of State Formation in Viking-Age South Scandinavia (c. ad 900-1050)". Viking and Medieval Scandinavia. 5: 65–104. doi:10.1484/J.VMS.1.100674. ISSN 1782-7183. JSTOR 45019120.
- Forte, A.; Oram, R.; Pederson, F. (2005), Viking Empires, Cambridge: Cambridge University Press, ISBN 0-521-82992-5
- Heijnis, Arjen (2018), "Early Viking camps in Scandinavia and abroad", in Hansen, Jesper; Bruus, Mette (eds.), The Fortified Viking Age. 36th Interdisciplinary Viking Symposium, Kulturhistoriske studier i centralitet - Archaeological & Historical Studies in Centrality, vol. 3, Odense City Museums, University Press of Southern Denmark, pp. 35–43, ISBN 9788740832129
- Olesen, Martin Borring (2000), "Trelleborg eller ej? om den skånske trelleborgs tilknytning til de danske ringborge", Kuml (in Danish): 91–111
- Price, T. Douglas (2015). Ancient Scandinavia: An Archaeological History from the First Humans to the Vikings. Oxford University Press. ISBN 978-0-19-023199-6.
- Runge, Mads (2018), "New archaeological investigations at Nonnebakken, a Viking Age fortress in Odense", in Hansen, Jesper; Bruus, Mette (eds.), The Fortified Viking Age. 36th Interdisciplinary Viking Symposium, Kulturhistoriske studier i centralitet - Archaeological & Historical Studies in Centrality, vol. 3, Odense City Museums, University Press of Southern Denmark, pp. 44–59, ISBN 9788740832129
- Runge, Mads Thagård; Gamble, Barry, eds. (2021), Nomination of Viking-Age Ring Fortresses for inclusion on the World Heritage List, Danish Agency for Culture and Palaces, ISBN 9788792687364
- Runge, Mads; Neubauer, Wolfgang, "Vikingeborgen Nonnebakken i Odense – Museum Odense", Årbogen Odense bys museer 2020, Odense bys museer, ISBN 9788790267360 – via museumodense.dk
- Sindbæk, Søren (January 2020). "Borgring and Harald Bluetooth's Burgenpolitik". Viking Encounters. Proceedings of the Eighteenth Viking Congress, Denmark, August 6–12, 2017.
- Ten Harkel, Letty (2019), "'Est haec effera gens': landscapes of negotiation on the former island of Walcheren, the Netherlands", in Monge, Julio Escalona; Vésteinsson, Orri; Brookes, Stuart (eds.), Polity and Neighbourhood in Early Medieval Europe, The Medieval Countryside, vol. 21, Turnhout: Brepols, pp. 225–265
- Weidhagen-Hallerdt, Margareta (2009), "A possible ring fort from the late Viking period in Helsingborg" (PDF), Current Swedish Archaeology, 17, archived from the original (PDF) on 19 October 2014

Supplement

- Lund, Julie; Sindbæk, Søren M. (2021-05-15). "Crossing the Maelstrom: New Departures in Viking Archaeology". Journal of Archaeological Research. 30 (2): 169–229. doi:10.1007/s10814-021-09163-3. hdl:10852/89013. ISSN 1573-7756.
- Ten Harkel, Letty (June 2015). "Aggersborg. The Viking-age settlement and fortress". Antiquity. 89 (345): 759–760. ProQuest 1761147618.
- Runge, Mads (2019-07-03). "Revitalising the Danish Viking Age Ring Fortress Nonnebakken, Odense, Denmark". Landscapes. 20 (2): 98–119. doi:10.1080/14662035.2020.1861726. ISSN 1466-2035. S2CID 232080910.
- Stilling, Niels Peter (1981), "Trelleborg-hypoteser. Om de danske vikingeborges funktion og historiske betydning", Scandia: 29–65
