= Trelleborg (Slagelse) =

Viking ring castle in Denmark

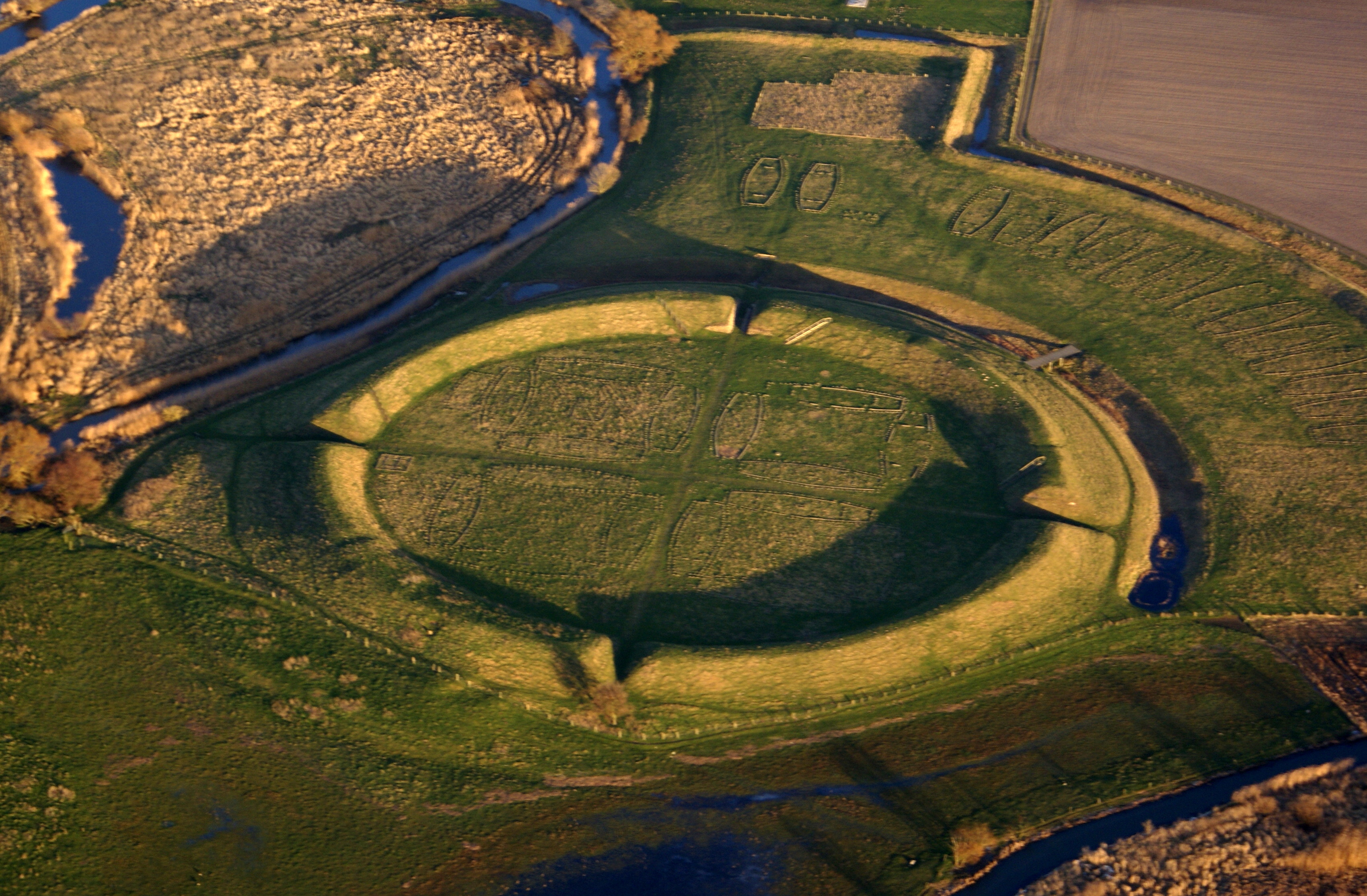
- Aerial view of Trelleborg, Slagelse

- Location of the site in Denmark
- 55°23′39″N 11°15′55″E
- Location: Region Zealand, Denmark

UNESCO World Heritage Site
- Official name: Viking-Age Ring Fortresses
- Criteria: (iii)(iv)
- Reference: 1660
- Inscription: 2023 (45th Session)

The Trelleborg (or Trælleborg), west of Slagelse on the Danish island of Zealand, is one of seven known Viking ring castles. When built, the fortress was situated on a peninsula that jutted into the swampy area between two rivers. The swamp was connected to the Great Belt by a lake and could be navigated by Viking ships. Trelleborg is believed to have been ordered by King Harald Bluetooth in the year 980 AD and it might have commanded the Great Belt and its sea traffic, between the islands of Zealand and Funen.

Trelleborg is the best preserved of the Viking ring fortresses. Since 1995, the Trelleborg Museum has presented the story of this particular fortress and the nearby area. Some of the artifacts found in connection with the archaeological excavations are on display at the museum, while others are on display at the Nationalmuseet in Copenhagen.

Along with four other Viking ring fortresses in Denmark, Trelleborg was inscribed on the UNESCO World Heritage List in 2023 because of its unique architecture and testimony to the strategic and military power of the House of Knýtlinga (Jelling Dynasty).

== Layout and construction ==
Similar to the other Viking ring castles found so far, the Trelleborg at Slagelse was designed as an exact circle with two roads crossing at right angles in the geometric center, leading to four gates with two gates always opposite each other. In each of the four quarters stood four almost identical longhouses arranged in a square. Unlike other ring castles, Trelleborg was extended with a sort of bailey. The whole fortress may have supplied room for some 1,300 people.

Along with Aggersborg, Fyrkat, Trelleborg is the only ring castle to have been fully excavated. As a result, many conclusions about it are tentative and may change with further excavation of other sites.

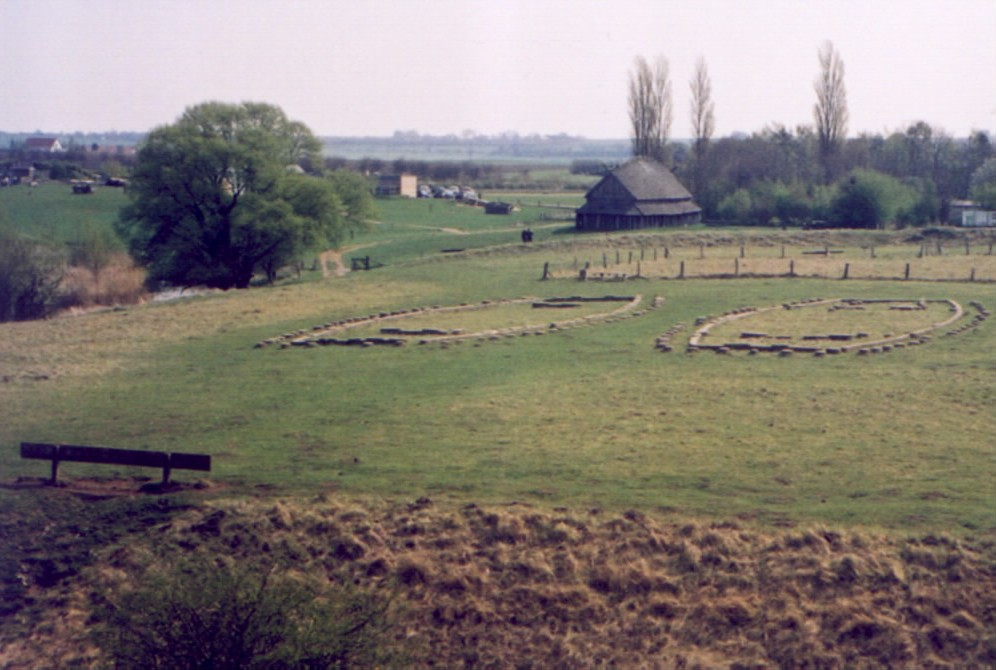
View from the ramparts of the main castle, looking east across the bailey. Two of the 14 longhouses can be seen outlined here. The fenced square is the site of an associated pagan cemetery.

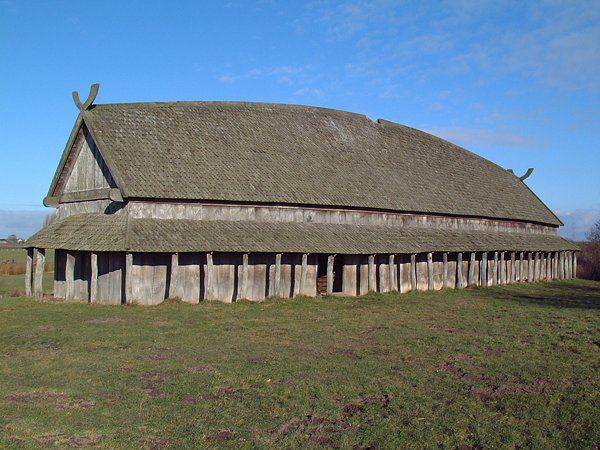
The reconstructed longhouse by the trelleborg.

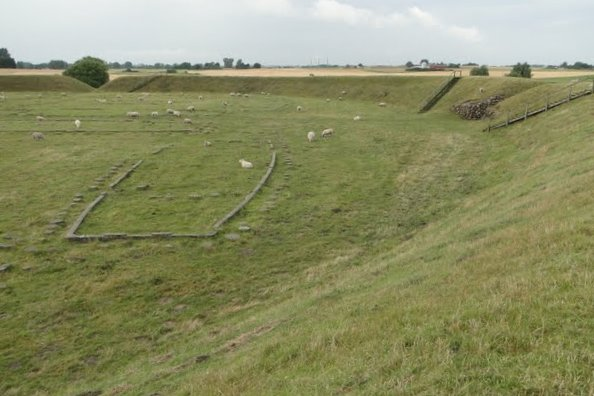
View from the ramparts looking in. The fortifications enclosed a total of 16 longhouses.

=== Main castle ===
The circular main castle was surrounded by a 5 m high rampart, 17.5 m wide at the base and with a diameter of 137 m. The outer walling was made of oak. Two rows of poles were supported by slanted beams from the outside and the room in between the poles was filled with loam and stones. The inside walling was also clad with wood and the two facades were reinforced by beams connecting the two. In the east, there was a 5 m broad berm protected by a ditch with a pointed profile, 17 m wide and 4 m deep. The ditch was not filled with water and had a palisade at its base. The two roads were covered with wood, and the four gates lined with stones on the inside. As in Fyrkat, there may have been a circular path along the inner side of the ramparts.

The fortifications encircled a total of 16 longhouses arranged in four squares 29.42 m long each. The houses had a somewhat ship-like form as the long walls were bulging outwards. Each house had four entrances, two at the short ends and two in the long walls, and was divided into three rooms with a large central hall (18 x 8 m) and two smaller rooms at the ends. The doors were protected by porches. Besides the large longhouses, there were also smaller houses to the north of the north eastern quarter, two small houses in the inner yard of the northeastern and southwestern quarter and a little square hut, each near the northern and western gates.

=== Bailey ===
The bailey of the fortress is unique, as other ring castles do not appear to have a bailey. The bailey was protected by a rampart of its own to the east. The 14 longhouses of the bailey, each 26.33 meters long, were placed with their axis through the length of the buildings pointing to the center of the main castle.

In an extension of this bailey is a cemetery of 135 graves. Most of the buried were found to be young men, but a few were women or children. Three graves contains mass burials, one for five and the other for eleven persons. Over two-thirds of the graves had no grave offerings, the others only had few pieces, weapons being rather rare. Only two graves were rich in items. One was a woman's grave with pearls, a bronze bucket, a wood casket and game stones. The other was the grave of a man with a bronze bowl and a silver adorned axe. The large amount of simple graves may indicate a Christian influence. Graves of horsemen were found on surrounding higher grounds.

== Excavation and finds ==
The site was excavated from 1934 to 1942. Most of the finds at Trelleborg, reflects a relatively peaceful daily life here and includes every day utensils such as pottery, locks, keys, fittings, knives, whetstones, combs, weaving weights, scissors and needles. A few craftsmen here were engaged in silver, gold and bronze work of a more delicate nature.

Weapons such as iron axes, arrow points and parts of shields were also found and there are strong indications of a battle and castle attack taking place at some point during the castles' short lifespan. 19 arrowheads were found buried deep into the ramparts and gates. Combined with the three mass graves, this is taken as solid evidence. The slain soldiers were quickly buried in the massgraves, many of them showing deep cuts and lethal wounds from close combat weapons. Strontium analysis of the skeletal remains has revealed that a larger part of the dead, originated from what we now know as Norway and Poland and are therefore thought to have been foreign mercenaries, stationed here as castle guards. This discovery falls in line with Harald Bluetooth's strong alliance with the Obotrite Slavs through his marriage with Tove, daughter of prince Mstivoj. Harald later fled to the town of Wolin (then known as Jumne), where he died from his wounds after fighting off his persecutors in 986-87 AD.

== Dating ==
Datings by dendrochronology, have found the wood used for the constructions to have been felled in the fall of 980 AD and subsequently used for building, presumably in the spring of 981 AD. The rather short construction time and the complete lack of any signs of maintenance, indicate an only short use of the buildings of no more than perhaps 10–15 years. Parts of the fortress, such as the outer eastern rampart was probably never completed before the site was abandoned. Archaeological finds shows that Trelleborg was under attack at some point, resulting in several dead soldiers and signs of fire, suggests the castle might have been destroyed by fire. The regions around the gates show signs of longer usage though.

Older, previous datings put the castle near the year 1000 AD.

== Today ==
The landscape surrounding the Trelleborg has changed considerably since the Viking Age, due to a land rise known as post-glacial rebound, affecting this part of the world, and the previous swamp has shrunk to a small bog, while the two rivers of Vårby Å and Tude Å, has reduced to narrow streams.

In 1948, one of the longhouses was reconstructed on the site, but more recent investigations have since led to other opinions on its true original design. Today the site of the Trelleborg is an open-air museum with some buildings for exhibits. The museum was established in 1995, and from 1999 to 2004 the Danish historian Kåre Johannessen was the curator at the museum. Slagelse Municipality has recently granted DK 25 mio. to update Trelleborg Museum with digital and virtual technology, in a project known as Ny Trelleborg. The municipality has also initiated a large nature restoration project of the entire river valley of Tude Å, including the trelleborg.

== In popular culture ==
In the book Eaters of the Dead by Michael Crichton, Trelleborg (mentioned as Trelburg) was a stop on Ibn Fadlan's journey. In the footnotes, Crichton confirmed that this was indeed Trelleborg near Slagelse.

In the book “Jomsviking” by Norwegian author Bjørn Andreas Bull-Hansen, Trelleborg figures as the base of Danish King Svein Forkbeard at the time of the battle of Svolder.

== Bibliography ==
- Steen Wulff Andersen: Vikingeborgen Trelleborg. Museet ved Trelleborg, 1995 (in Danish)
- Steen Wulff Andersen: Trelleborg. In: Reallexikon der Germanischen Altertumskunde Bd. 31. Berlin 2006. S. 157–160. (in German)
- Bent Jørgensen: Et gensyn med navnet Trælleborg. In: Gillian Fellows-Jensen, Niels Lund: Beretning fra fjortene tværfaglige vikingesymposium 1995. (in Danish)
- Eva Nyman: Trælleborg. In: Reallexikon der Germanischen Altertumskunde Bd. 31. Berlin 2006. S. 118–119. (in German)
