= Fyrkat =

Viking ring castle in Denmark

Coordinates: 56°37′24″N 9°46′14″E

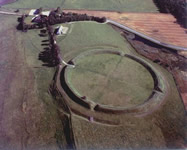
- Aerial view of the Viking ring fortress of Fyrkat. The circular geometry is evident.

- Location of the site in Denmark
- Type: Viking ring fortress
- Periods: Iron Age, Viking Age
- Location: Jutland, Denmark

History
- Built: c. 980

UNESCO World Heritage Site
- Criteria: Cultural:
- Designated: 2023 (45th session)
- Part of: Viking-Age Ring Fortresses
- Reference no.: 1660-001

Fyrkat is a former Viking ring castle in Denmark, dating from c. 980 AD. It is located near the town of Hobro, some distance from the present end of the Mariager Fjord in Northern Jutland. The fortress is built on a narrow piece of land, with a stream on one side and a swampy area on the other side.

Likely built during the reign of Harald Gormsson or his son Sweyn Forkbeard, the fortress may have served as barracks or as a defensive stronghold. It would have helped to enable control of the traffic on the main land-based trading route between Aalborg and Aarhus. Because of its unique architecture and testimony to the strategic power of the House of Knýtlinga (Jelling dynasty), Fyrkat was inscribed on the UNESCO World Heritage List along with four other Viking ring castles in 2023.

== Layout and construction ==
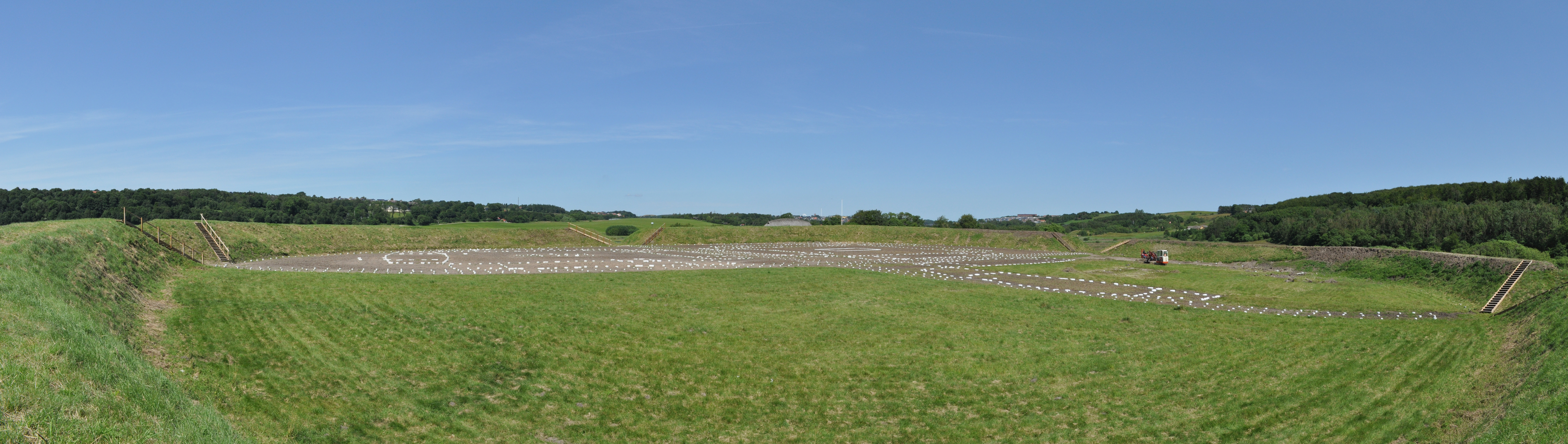

Like the other ring castles (or forts) at Aggersborg or Trelleborg near Slagelse, it is designed as an exact circle with four gates opposite to each other and connected by two wooden roads that cross in a right angle in the exact middle of the fort. A circular road gave access to the wall. In each of the four quarters stood four longhouses of the same design, arranged in a square with a smaller house in the middle.

The inner diameter of the ramparts was 120 meters, and the width at the base 12–13 meters. They were constructed of three rows of vertical wooden poles. Each pole is connected to the next ring by beams. The innermost row was the lowest, and the gaps were filled horizontally with planks forming a wall to the inside of the fort. The middle row was as high as the earthwork and carried the inner side of the walkway. The earth filled sloped to the inside so the ramparts could be easily accessed from every point of the circular road. The outer row of poles was strengthened on the inside and outside with slanted beams at the base. They probably were higher than the middle row and supported a parapet. The gaps between the posts were again filled horizontally with planks, but on the outside, there was also a wall of vertical trunks slightly leaning against the wall. The space in between the post rows was stacked with some 10000 cubic meters of turf. On the wall, there was a walkway made of planks. The outer wall is presumed to have stood some four meters high. The northeast quarter was protected by a ditch with a pointed bottom about 7 to 8 meters wide and under 2 meters deep. The ditch on the west and southwest side was never finished. The other sides were protected by a river and a rather swampy area. A structure in front of the west gate may have been a gatehouse of some sort.

The roads inside the fort were founded on three to five rows of short poles rammed into the ground and supporting strong beams running lengthwise along the rows. These were then topped by strong planks spanning the width of the road. The circular road along the inside of the ramparts rested on two rows of beams.

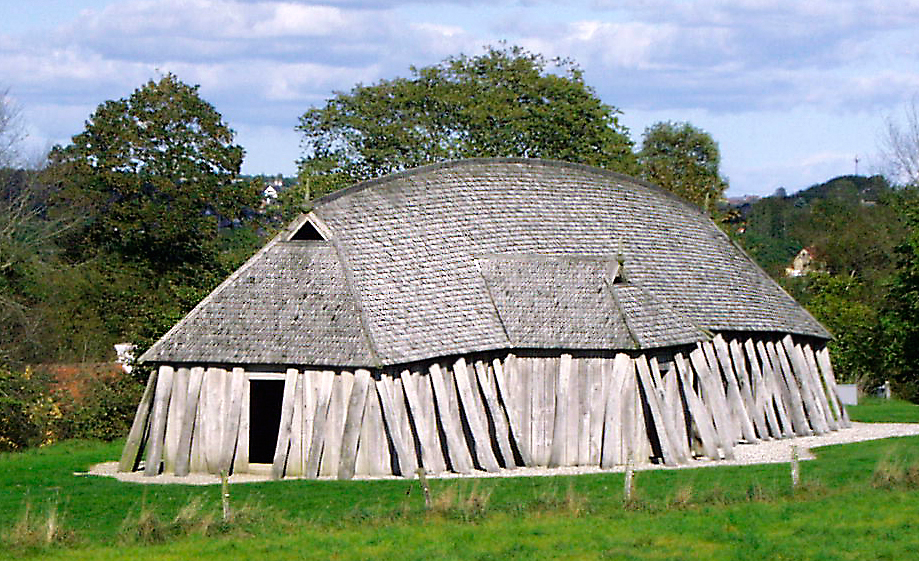
Reconstruction of a Viking house

The 16 identical longhouses were arranged in a square with the corners almost touching. They were 28.5 meters long (96 Roman feet of 29.6 cm), 5 meters wide at the ends and 7.5 meters in the middle, the long walls slightly curved to the outside. The walls consisted of double rows of posts with planks wedged horizontally between them to make a wall. Along the outside ran a row of posts slanted to the wall, either to support it at the top like buttresses or maybe in some sort of cruck like construction being the rafters of the roof. On how the roof was built exactly, the opinions differ. It might have been coated with reeds or maybe wood shingles or even a construction of planks similar to the ships. Inside the houses, each end was walled off to make a small room, maybe a pantry or storeroom. The two small rooms had doors to the outside on the short end and could be accessed from the large middle room on the inside. Near the ends of the 18-meter-long great middle room, each long wall had a door set diagonally to the door on the other side that led into a small porch with a door to the outside. On the inside, the great room had a large hearth in the middle and a raised, wide bank alongside the outer walls for sleeping. Of the longhouses in Fyrkat, at least two contained smithies, and gold was worked with in two others. About a quarter of the excavated houses seem to have been warehouses of some sort.

== Cemetery ==
There are two lines of post holes running through the cemetery; they are believed to indicate a road. This road is not uniform; there seem to be more supports in the part of the structure closest to the bulk of the graves. It runs parallel to one of the axis of the fort, and it is thus believed to have been constructed at the same time as the fort.

There are a total of thirty burials in various states of preservation. This does not mean that there were not more than thirty burials, since shallower burials were common and may not have been recovered. The graves are all inhumations oriented in an east-west direction. There may have been mounds on top of the graves; however, they have not survived into the modern day. Eighteen graves had traces of having a coffin. They were about 75 to 220 cm in length, and it is not possible to tell their height.

Some of the objects found include: coffins, daily goods, fabrics, and jewelry. Several more unusual containers used for holding the body were also found; these include a cart and a chest. Carts have been found in many graves, and it is speculated that it was meant to transport the body in the afterlife and that it was a symbol of status. Ten of the graves had grave goods, and three had objects that most likely found their way into the grave accidentally. Most of the objects were beads and other jewelry or household objects, and there was only one combat weapon found (an axe was also found, but it probably just had symbolic meaning due to its small size). Objects were often placed at chest level or in boxes.

Grave 4, the most lavish grave, has some similarities to other graves found in Scandinavia. The woman is buried with much jewelry and several foreign objects. Its luxury suggests that the Fyrkat community was wealthy. The best indication of the wealth of a burial is the combination of grave goods and coffin. At Fyrkat, these kinds of graves were centrally located around the platform. Graves were identified as belonging to children if the size of the grave was less than 150 cm, and the gender of the remains in a grave is typically dictated by the objects found with it. Generally, axes are for male graves, boxes, keys, and brooches are for female graves, and knives and whetstones were commonly found in both male and female graves.

== Excavation and finds ==
The site was excavated between 1950 and 1958 by the Architect and museum inspector C.G. Schultz. The ramparts, that had almost been ploughed level through the ages, were piled up again, and the postholes of the roads and buildings were filled with concrete.

The museum at Hobro houses most of the things found at Fyrkat. Most were found in the graveyard to the northwest of the fort that had a wooden-planked road leading to it. The most precious find was a piece of gold jewelry with a nice bird's head. With a total of about 30 graves of men, women, and children, some were buried in wagon crates, such as were found in Oseberg, others in coffins. The poor were randomly mixed with the rich.

== Dating ==
The very similar castle of Trelleborg near Slagelse has been dated precisely to the spring of 981 by tree ring dating; Fyrkat might be a year or two older, Aggersborg could be slightly younger. Not enough was found at Nonnebakken to make an exact enough dating possible. Yet the forts are so extremely similar that it seems most probable that a single mind conceived them. Fyrkat seems to have been inhabited only for a rather short period of time, maybe not much more than a decade, maybe even less. By the year 1000, the fort seems to have been deserted and shortly after had simply burned to the ground without any evidence of fighting.

== Today ==
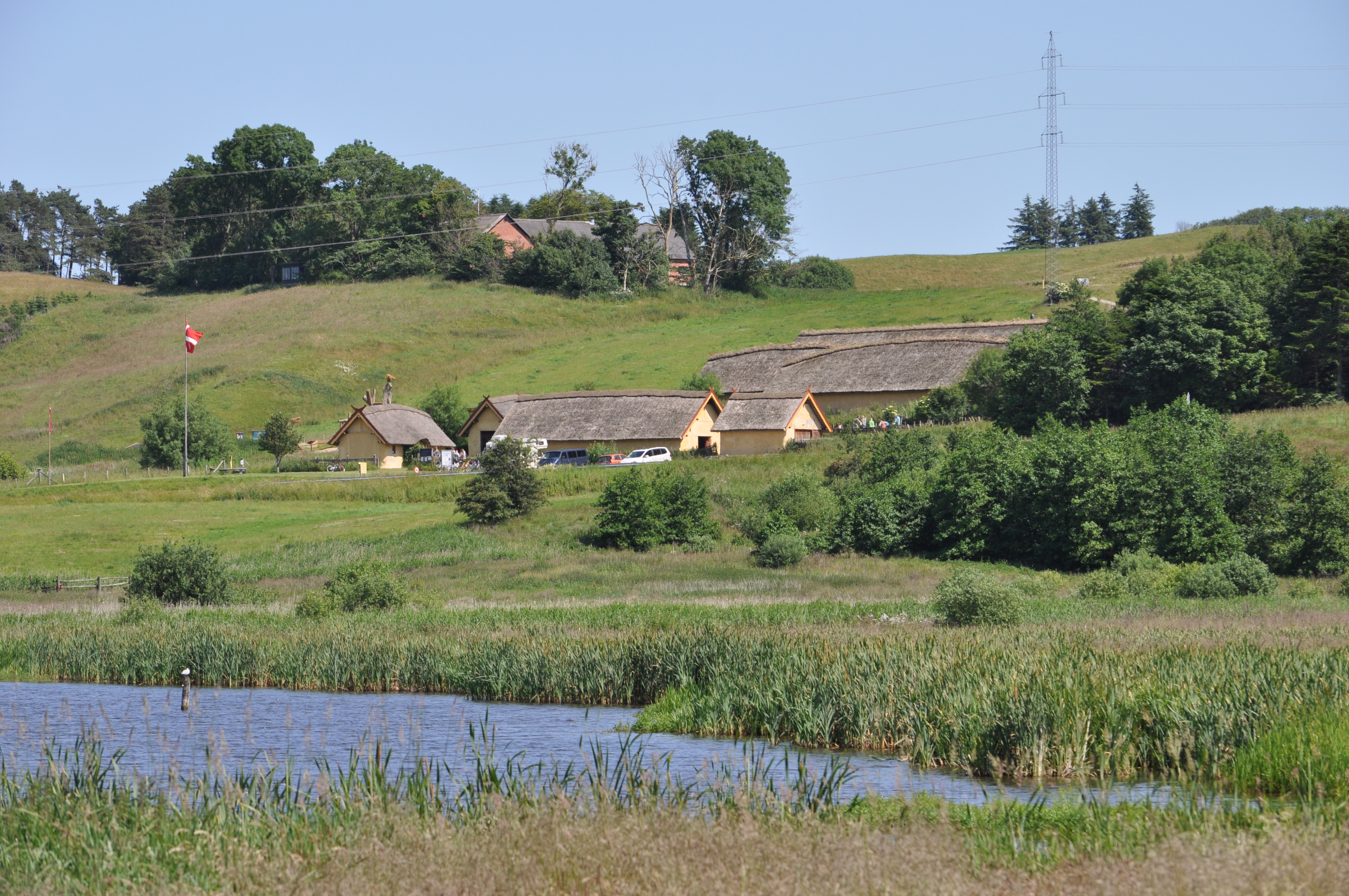
View of Viking Center Fyrkat.

In 1985, a longhouse was reconstructed besides the ramparts, just outside the fort. This reconstruction is claimed to be more accurate than the first longhouse reconstruction from 1948 at Trelleborg near Slagelse.

=== Viking Center Fyrkat ===
In 1993 the visitor centre of Viking Center Fyrkat was built about one kilometre from the ring fort. The center resembles a large Viking farm, with a big longhouse, a smithy, a barn and some smaller buildings including exhibition buildings and a museum shop - nine buildings all in all. The center has an educational focus and aims at presenting a complete Viking Age environment here on the model of a supplier for the fort. This includes regular re-enactments and various activities involving curious and willing visitors. No Viking farm has been found near the ring fort of Fyrkat, the buildings have been reconstructed after excavated examples in Vorbasse, a small town in southern Jutland.

== See also ==
- Viking ring fortress. There is a list of the excavated ring forts.

== Bibliography ==
- Olsen O. (1979): Fyrkat (in Danish)
- Mondfeld W. (1986): Wikingfahrt-1 (in German)
- Roesdahl, Else (1977): Fyrkat: En Jysk Vikingeborg II:Oldsagerne Og Gravpladsen, Copenhagen: Det Kgl. Nordiske Oldskriftsselskab, 1st ed. (in Danish)
