= Aggersborg =

Largest of Denmark's former Viking ring fortresses

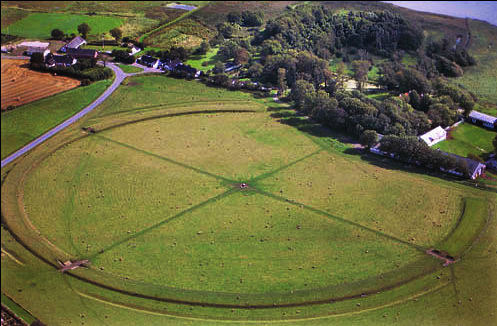
- Aggersborg, the largest Viking ring fortress in Denmark

- Location of the site in Denmark
- 56°59′43.6″N 9°15′17.8″E
- Type: Viking ring fortress
- Periods: Iron Age, Viking Age
- Location: North Denmark Region, Denmark

History
- Built: c. 980

UNESCO World Heritage Site
- Criteria: Cultural:
- Designated: 2023 (45th session)
- Part of: Viking-Age Ring Fortresses
- Reference no.: 1660-001

Aggersborg is the largest of Denmark's former Viking ring fortress, and one of the largest archaeological sites in Denmark. It is located near Aggersund on the north side of the Limfjord. It consists of a circular rampart surrounded by a ditch. Four main roads arranged in a cross connects the fortress center with the rampart's outer ring. The roads were tunneled under the outer rampart, leaving the circular structure intact. Many archaeological excavations have been conducted on the site, revealing its original structure and design. These excavations also uncovered a large number of artefacts from the Iron Age and Viking Age. The surface of the site as it exists today is a reconstruction.

The location was originally the site of an Iron Age village which was removed during the 10th century to allow for the construction of the ring fortress. The fortress itself was likely constructed c. 980, and was later abandoned. Although the exact purpose of the fortress is unknown, the location is of significant strategic importance, as it overlooks a narrow strait of the Limfjord. In 2023, Aggersborg, along with four other ring fortresses in Denmark, was inscribed on the UNESCO World Heritage List.

== History ==
Dating the structure has proven difficult, because it was the site of an Iron Age village before the construction of the ring fortress. Archaeological finds suggest that this village was settled during the late 8th century. It was destroyed during the 10th century, and the grounds were cleared for the construction of the fortress. The ring fortress itself is believed to have been constructed around 980 during the reign of king Harold Bluetooth and/or Sweyn Forkbeard. Five of the six ring fortresses in historical Denmark have been dated to this era. The exact purpose of the fortress remains uncertain. Some historians have argued that the fortress' primary function was as a barracks or training grounds in connection with Sweyn Forkbeard's armies, which conquered England in the early 1000s. This theory has been disproven by dendrochronological dating of the site. It is more likely that Aggersborg and the other Viking ring fortresses were intended as defensive strongholds along strategic trade points and/or administrative outposts of the budding state.

Aggersborg location was of strategic importance, as it was protected but also easily accessible by ship. Both ends of the Limfjord were open waterways when the fortress was constructed and the fjord constituted an important sailing route from the North Sea to the Kattegat. Although the waterway was open, it is speculated that ships had to portage on land past Løgstørgrunde. The portion of the fjord that Aggersborg is located is relatively narrow and was one of the three ancient crossings of the Hærvejen (army road) across the Limfjord. The two other crossings existed to the north of Farstrup, and near Lindholm Høje in Ålborg, respectively.

The structure of the ring fortress was completed within one or two years, and only used for a short period of time; between five and twenty years. The ring fortress had an inner diameter of 240 m (790 ft). The ditch was located 8 m (26 ft) outside of the rampart, and was approximately 1.3 m (4.3 ft) deep. The wall is believed to have been 4 m (13 ft) tall. The rampart was constructed of soil and turf, reinforced and clad with oak wood. The rampart formed the basis for a wooden parapet. Smaller streets were located within the four main sections of the fortress. In the 21st century the fortress is approximately 10 m (33 ft) above sea-level, and 350 m (1,150 ft) from the coastline. It is believed the coastline and sea-level at the site had changed over time, as the strait was once much wider, reaching closer to the fortress itself. The modern Aggersborg is a reconstruction created in the 1990s. It is lower than the original fortress.

== Archaeological remains ==
Several archaeological excavations have been carried out at the site since the 20th century. The National Museum of Denmark conducted significant excavations of the site between 1945 and 1954. In 1970 and again in 1990, additional trenches were studied. Together, these excavations recovered more than 30,000 artefacts and many animal remains. They covered approximately 13,000 m^{2} (140,000 ft^{2}) of the site's total area and recorded some 19,500 individual features. The large number of archaeological finds discovered on the site include many imported luxury items. Examples include beads of mountain crystal and pieces of glass jars. A damaged golden ring has been discovered on the site as well; a replica is displayed in the Aggersborg museum.

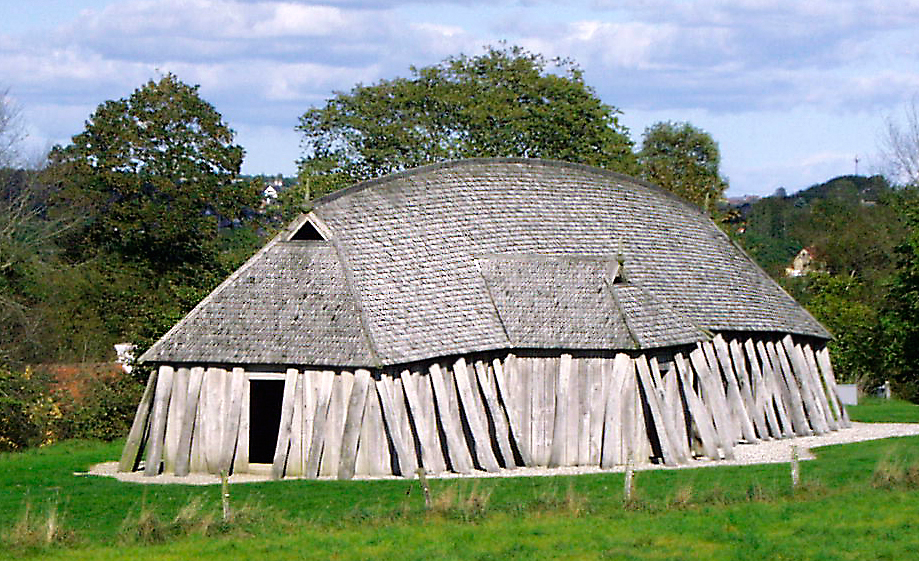
Reconstruction of a Viking house at the ring fortress of Fyrkat.

Excavations have also uncovered artefacts from the Iron Age village which predated the ring fortress at the site. These artefacts include a variety of common household objects: pottery, iron tools and weapons, jewellery, and coins. Very few traces of specialised craft were uncovered, e.g. evidence of metalworking or refuse from bone-working. These artefacts also included a number of objects of import, primarily from Norway, but also western Europe and the British Isles. Based on these objects, the village was likely settled in the late 8th century and demolished during the 10th century. After the fortress which replaced it was abandoned, the village was not resettled, though artefacts from the period which immediately followed have been found in areas near the site.

The site's ring fortress structure is typified by its earthen rampart and its carefully aligned circular design, comprising wooded structures and buildings which are arranged into courtyards. Archaeologists have estimated that the ring fortress could hold a 5,000-man garrison, located in 48 longhouses. Twelve longhouses were located in each quadrant, all located on a north–south or west–east axis. No remains of the actual houses exist, but proof of the location of the walls has been found. The individual houses are believed to have been similar to the form seen on the Camnin chest, a house-shaped reliquary, as well as on house-shaped tombstones in England. The houses had curved roofs and curved sides, similar to the form of a ship; 32.5 m (107 ft) long and 8.5 m (28 ft) across. They were divided in a long inner hall, around 19 m (62 ft) long, with smaller rooms at the end. It is estimated that construction of a single Aggersborg house required 66 large oak trees. The entire structure, housing included, is estimated to have used 5,000 large oaks.

== Gallery ==
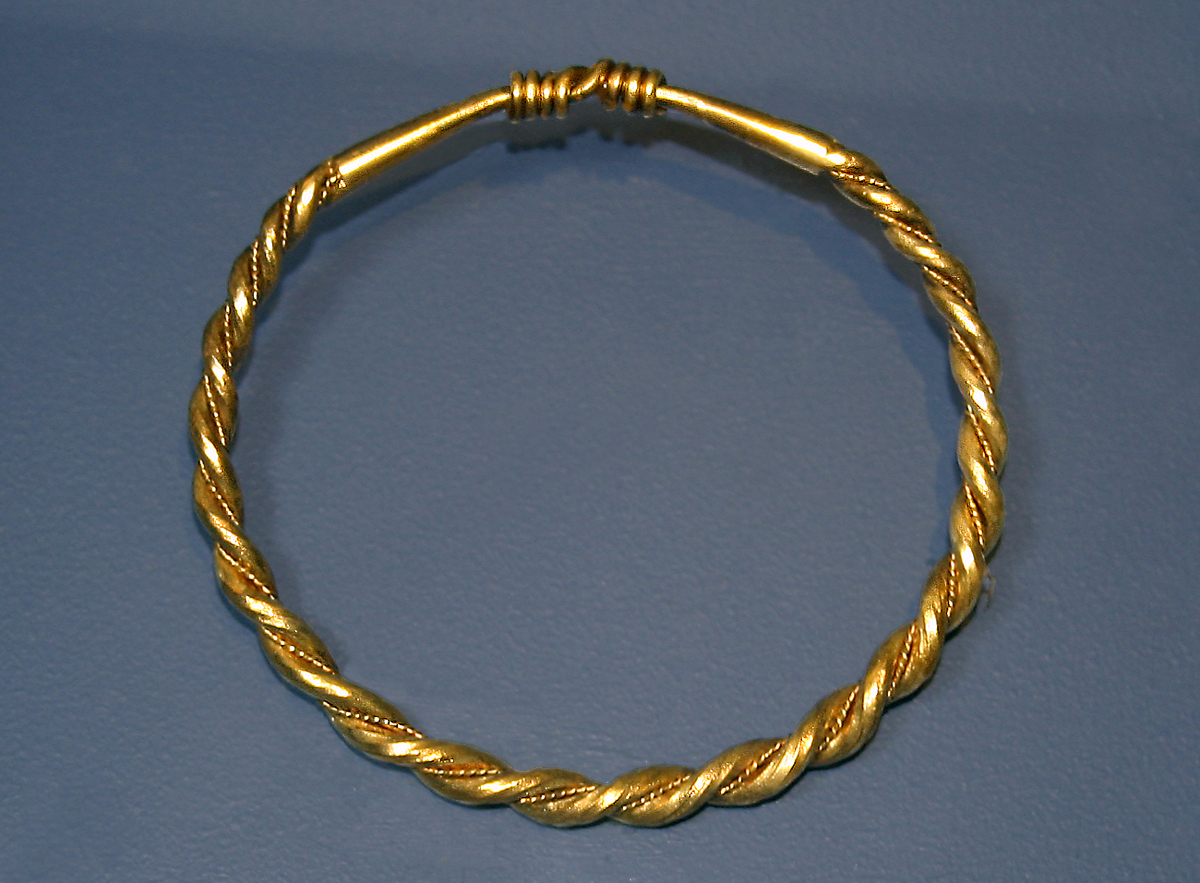
Golden armband found near Aggersborg.

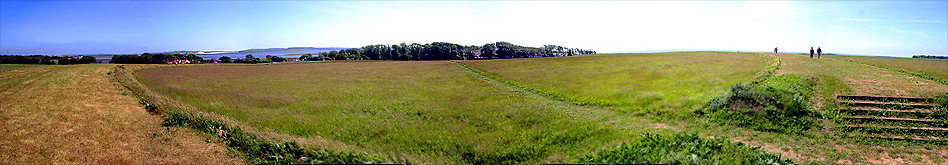
Panorama of the existing site.

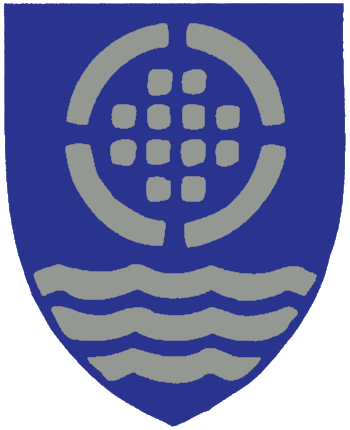
Løgstør Municipality used a shield that featured an illustration of Aggersbord.
