= Nonnebakken =

Viking ring castle in Denmark

Coordinates: 55°23′32.10″N 10°23′17.35″E

Nonebakken
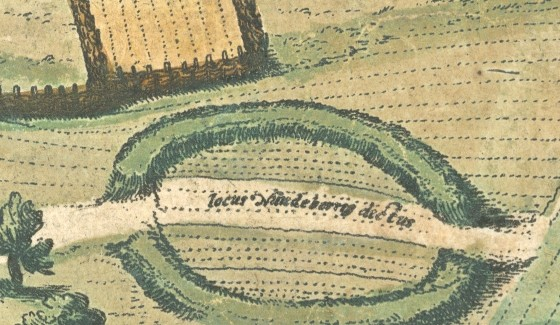
- Detail from a 1593 engraving, showing the remains of the former ring fort of Nonnebakken

- Location of the site in Denmark
- Type: Viking ring fortress
- Periods: Iron Age, Viking Age
- Location: Odense, Denmark

History
- Built: c. 980

UNESCO World Heritage Site
- Criteria: Cultural:
- Designated: 2023 (45th session)
- Part of: Viking-Age Ring Fortresses
- Reference no.: 1660-001

Nonnebakken (literally, "The Nun Hill") is a hill in Odense, Denmark. It is the site of one of Denmark's six former Viking ring castles, built during the reign of Sweyn Forkbeard, who had forced his father Harold Bluetooth to leave the country and seek refuge with the Jomsvikings on Wollin (modern Poland) around 975. The fort enabled its occupier to control the Odense River passing next to the hill.

The name refers to a Benedictine nunnery located here in earlier times. At the end of the 12th century, the nuns left the site to build a new church in Dalum to the southeast, now a suburb of Odense.

The earthwork ramparts can be recognized in the "panorama of Odense" in the medieval tome Civitates Orbis Terrarum from Georg Braun and Frans Hogenberg. The panorama appears as plate 30 in Volume 5, finished in 1598. Plate 30 was engraved in 1593, based on information from Heinrich Rantzau or from sketches he gave in order. It also appears on the panorama of Odense published by Braunius in 1593.

The archaeological remains of Nonnebakken took heavy damage during the late 19th century, when a building for the Odd Fellow lodge was constructed on the site. In the 20th century, scientific excavations led by Fyns Stiftsmuseum revealed that the circular castle had an inner diameter of 120 m and was built in the years 980-1000, similar to the other Viking ring castles.

Along with four other Viking ring castles in Denmark, in 2023 Nonnebakken was inscribed on the UNESCO World Heritage List because of its unique architecture and testimony to the strategic and military power of the House of Knýtlinga (Jelling dynasty).

== Excavation and finds ==
Although finds have been reported from 1775 and 1889, the extent of the whole structure was first determined in 1953. In 1988, archaeological excavations were conducted in relation to a construction project involving cable laying. A filled ditch with a pointed profile around the fortress was observed. It was at least 4 m wide and 2 m deep, with a berm of maximal 10–12 m. The latest filling could be dated to the time of the nunnery. The profile of a pointed bottom ditch 8 m wide and some 4 m deep, was also excavated in the northeast and the northwest. During excavations prior to larger construction works for heating pipes in 1995/97/98, a ditch 11 m wide and 3 m deep was observed. An oaken spade was unearthed, dated by dendrochronology to the "functioning" time of the ring castle. In 2002, excavations revealed parts of the old nunnery.

== Literature ==
- Kronborg Christensen, John (1973). Vikingetidens langhuse på Trelleborg, Aggersborg, Fyrkat og Nonnebakken (83 pages) (in Danish). Copenhagen: Kunstakademiets Arkitektskole.
- Thrane, Henrik (1987). Nonnebakken. Odenses forsvundne vikingeborg, 3rd revised ed. (28 pages). Odense: Fyens Stiftsmuseum.
