= 2025 Skive municipal election =

Municipal election in Denmark

- 18 November 2025

All 27 seats to the Skive municipal council 14 seats needed for a majority
- Turnout: 25,824 (71.8%) ▲0.7%
	First party	Second party	Third party
	V	A	F
Party	Venstre	Social Democrats	Green Left
Last election	12 seats, 41.6%	8 seats, 30.5%	2 seats, 6.9%
Seats won	9	5	4
Seat change	▼3	▼3	▲2
Popular vote	8,056	4,646	3,416
Percentage	31.8%	18.3%	13.5%
Swing	▼9.8%	▼12.2%	▲6.6%
	Fourth party	Fifth party	Sixth party
	Æ	L	O
Party	Denmark Democrats	Skive-Listen	Danish People's Party
Last election	Did not stand	2 seats, 5.2%	1 seat, 2.9%
Seats won	4	2	2
Seat change	▲4	0	▲1
Popular vote	3,391	1,620	1,543
Percentage	13.4%	6.4%	6.1%
Swing	New	▲1.2%	▲3.2%
	Seventh party	Eighth party	Ninth party
	I	D	C
Party	Liberal Alliance	New Right	Conservatives
Last election	Did not stand	1 seat, 4.1%	1 seat, 4.5%
Seats won	1	0	0
Seat change	▲1	▼1	▼1
Popular vote	833	547	486
Percentage	3.3%	2.2%	1.9%
Swing	New	▼2.0%	▼2.5%
Mayor before election
Peder Kirkegaard
Venstre
Mayor after election
Alfred Brunsgaard
Venstre

The 2025 Skive Municipal election was held on November 18, 2025, to elect the 27 members to sit in the regional council for the Skive Municipal council, in the period of 2026 to 2029. Alfred Brunsgaard from Venstre won the mayoral position following the election, and will take over from his party colleague Peder Kirkegaard.

== Background ==
Following the 2021 election, Peder Christian Kirkegaard won the mayoral position for a third term in a row. However, Christian Kirkegaard announced in August 2024, his decision to stand for another term following this election. In November 2024, it was decided that Alfred Brunsgaard would become the new mayoral candidate of Venstre.

== Electoral system ==
For elections to Danish municipalities, a number varying from 9 to 31 are chosen to be elected to the municipal council. The seats are then allocated using the D'Hondt method and a closed list proportional representation. Skive Municipality had 27 seats in 2025.

Unlike in Danish General Elections, in elections to municipal councils, electoral alliances are allowed.

== Electoral alliances ==
=== Electoral Alliance 1 ===
Party		Political alignment
A	Social Democrats	Centre-left
M	Moderates	Centre to Centre-right

=== Electoral Alliance 2 ===
Party		Political alignment
B	Social Liberals	Centre to Centre-left
L	Skive-Listen	Local politics

=== Electoral Alliance 3 ===
Party		Political alignment
C	Conservatives	Centre-right
I	Liberal Alliance	Centre-right to Right-wing
O	Danish People's Party	Right-wing to Far-right
Æ	Denmark Democrats	Right-wing to Far-right

=== Electoral Alliance 4 ===
Party		Political alignment
F	Green Left	Centre-left to Left-wing
Ø	Red-Green Alliance	Left-wing to Far-Left

== Results by polling station ==
Division	A	B	C	D	F	I	L	M	O	V	Æ	Ø
Division	%	%	%	%	%	%	%	%	%	%	%	%
Aakjær	17.9	1.6	2.4	1.3	17.0	4.4	10.8	0.5	5.5	26.1	10.0	2.5
Skivehus	19.7	0.9	2.7	1.6	16.2	3.0	8.7	0.2	3.9	33.7	8.1	1.3
Brårup	19.4	1.3	2.9	1.3	19.5	3.6	12.8	0.5	4.3	20.7	10.9	2.9
Højslev	18.5	0.7	2.8	1.4	9.6	4.2	3.4	0.4	19.1	26.8	11.5	1.6
Ørslevkloster	11.4	1.5	2.6	0.9	9.4	2.4	2.6	0.5	12.0	36.3	18.2	2.2
Rønbjerg	10.7	1.8	2.0	2.5	9.5	2.3	30.0	0.2	5.0	20.9	13.6	1.4
Hem	26.9	0.8	0.4	1.9	5.9	4.9	4.4	0.9	4.4	31.7	16.5	1.3
Lihme	14.3	1.0	1.0	1.0	30.3	2.8	1.0	0.8	6.3	23.5	17.0	1.3
Oddense - Otting	12.7	0.2	1.1	3.5	5.4	2.8	1.3	0.0	2.6	59.2	9.5	1.7
Rødding Forsamlingshus	17.2	0.6	0.3	1.5	8.0	3.1	0.8	0.0	3.5	50.4	12.9	1.8
Glyngøre	18.5	0.5	0.6	8.6	7.7	2.3	0.5	0.5	3.2	42.8	13.7	1.2
Durup	11.7	0.1	1.8	5.3	4.5	4.1	1.0	0.1	4.7	43.5	21.1	2.1
Roslev	26.7	1.1	0.7	4.2	9.6	2.6	0.8	0.4	3.1	29.4	20.0	1.4
Jebjerg-Lyby	27.8	0.8	0.7	2.6	5.6	2.3	2.3	0.2	8.6	33.3	14.4	1.3
Balling	21.4	0.8	1.1	1.3	14.5	3.6	1.4	0.0	4.2	33.9	16.9	0.9
Breum	10.5	0.6	0.9	2.0	9.1	2.4	1.9	0.0	4.5	48.2	18.5	1.6
Håsum-Ramsing	32.5	0.7	0.2	2.7	11.9	2.2	1.2	0.0	3.2	29.1	15.0	1.2
Selde	11.0	0.8	0.6	3.1	8.9	2.0	0.7	0.1	3.6	34.3	33.9	1.0
Lem-Vejby	14.8	0.4	1.4	3.1	24.3	2.7	0.6	0.6	7.8	31.3	10.7	2.1
Fur	8.9	0.0	0.7	0.6	11.7	0.7	2.8	0.2	2.4	45.4	22.0	4.6

== Results by polling station ==
Division	A	B	C	D	F	I	L	M	O	V	Æ	Ø
Division	%	%	%	%	%	%	%	%	%	%	%	%
Aakjær	17.9	1.6	2.4	1.3	17.0	4.4	10.8	0.5	5.5	26.1	10.0	2.5
Skivehus	19.7	0.9	2.7	1.6	16.2	3.0	8.7	0.2	3.9	33.7	8.1	1.3
Brårup	19.4	1.3	2.9	1.3	19.5	3.6	12.8	0.5	4.3	20.7	10.9	2.9
Højslev	18.5	0.7	2.8	1.4	9.6	4.2	3.4	0.4	19.1	26.8	11.5	1.6
Ørslevkloster	11.4	1.5	2.6	0.9	9.4	2.4	2.6	0.5	12.0	36.3	18.2	2.2
Rønbjerg	10.7	1.8	2.0	2.5	9.5	2.3	30.0	0.2	5.0	20.9	13.6	1.4
Hem	26.9	0.8	0.4	1.9	5.9	4.9	4.4	0.9	4.4	31.7	16.5	1.3
Lihme	14.3	1.0	1.0	1.0	30.3	2.8	1.0	0.8	6.3	23.5	17.0	1.3
Oddense - Otting	12.7	0.2	1.1	3.5	5.4	2.8	1.3	0.0	2.6	59.2	9.5	1.7
Rødding Forsamlingshus	17.2	0.6	0.3	1.5	8.0	3.1	0.8	0.0	3.5	50.4	12.9	1.8
Glyngøre	18.5	0.5	0.6	8.6	7.7	2.3	0.5	0.5	3.2	42.8	13.7	1.2
Durup	11.7	0.1	1.8	5.3	4.5	4.1	1.0	0.1	4.7	43.5	21.1	2.1
Roslev	26.7	1.1	0.7	4.2	9.6	2.6	0.8	0.4	3.1	29.4	20.0	1.4
Jebjerg-Lyby	27.8	0.8	0.7	2.6	5.6	2.3	2.3	0.2	8.6	33.3	14.4	1.3
Balling	21.4	0.8	1.1	1.3	14.5	3.6	1.4	0.0	4.2	33.9	16.9	0.9
Breum	10.5	0.6	0.9	2.0	9.1	2.4	1.9	0.0	4.5	48.2	18.5	1.6
Håsum-Ramsing	32.5	0.7	0.2	2.7	11.9	2.2	1.2	0.0	3.2	29.1	15.0	1.2
Selde	11.0	0.8	0.6	3.1	8.9	2.0	0.7	0.1	3.6	34.3	33.9	1.0
Lem-Vejby	14.8	0.4	1.4	3.1	24.3	2.7	0.6	0.6	7.8	31.3	10.7	2.1
Fur	8.9	0.0	0.7	0.6	11.7	0.7	2.8	0.2	2.4	45.4	22.0	4.6

== Opinion polls ==
Polling firm	Fieldwork date	Sample size	V	A	F	L	C	D	O	B	Ø	I	M	Æ	Others	Lead
Epinion	4 Sep - 13 Oct 2025	522	25.9	23.5	11.1	–	1.8	–	6.4	0.4	1.8	4.9	1.1	20.6	2.6	2.4
2024 european parliament election	9 Jun 2024		17.8	16.9	12.7	–	6.1	–	7.2	3.5	2.8	6.1	5.4	20.4	–	2.6
2022 general election	1 Nov 2022		13.9	31.1	6.3	–	5.6	2.9	2.0	1.3	1.8	6.3	5.2	21.5	–	9.6
2021 regional election	16 Nov 2021		34.1	33.9	5.7	–	7.9	3.8	3.7	3.8	2.5	1.1	–	–	–	0.2
2021 municipal election	16 Nov 2021		41.6 (12)	30.5 (8)	6.9 (2)	5.2 (2)	4.5 (1)	4.1 (1)	2.9 (1)	2.3 (0)	1.6 (0)	–	–	–	–	11.1
