= 2021 Skive municipal election =

← 2017	16 November 2021	2025 →

All 27 seats to the Skive Municipal Council 14 seats needed for a majority
- Turnout: 25,903 (71.1%) ▼4.1pp
	First party	Second party	Third party
	V	A	F
Party	Venstre	Social Democrats	Green Left
Last election	11 seats, 36.3%	9 seats, 30.7%	2 seats, 5.4%
Seats won	12	8	2
Seat change	▲1	▼1	0
Popular vote	10,619	7,791	1,758
Percentage	41.6%	30.5%	6.9%
Swing	▲5.3%	▼0.2%	▲1.5%
	Fourth party	Fifth party	Sixth party
	M	C	D
Party	Skive-Listen	Conservatives	New Right
Last election	2 seats, 8.8%	0 seats, 2.2%	Did not stand
Seats won	2	1	1
Seat change	0	▲1	▲1
Popular vote	1,336	1,137	1,058
Percentage	5.2%	4.4%	4.1%
Swing	▼3.6%	▲2.2%	New
	Seventh party	Eighth party
	O	B
Party	Danish People's Party	Social Liberals
Last election	2 seats, 7.9%	1 seats, 3.3%
Seats won	1	0
Seat change	▼1	▼1
Popular vote	741	583
Percentage	2.9%	2.3%
Swing	▼5.0%	▼1.0%
Mayor before election
Peder Christian Kirkegaard
Venstre
Mayor after election
Peder Christian Kirkegaard
Venstre

Peder Christian Kirkegaard from Venstre stood to be re-elected for a third term in Skive Municipality who had since 2007 municipal reform only had mayors from Venstre. Venstre gained a seat, but was still 2 seats short of an absolute majority. However 3 other parties from the traditional blue bloc won a seat each, and Peder Christian Kirkegaard was chosen to sit for a third term.

== Electoral system ==
For elections to Danish municipalities, a number varying from 9 to 31 are chosen to be elected to the municipal council. The seats are then allocated using the D'Hondt method and a closed list proportional representation. Skive Municipality had 27 seats in 2021

Unlike in Danish General Elections, in elections to municipal councils, electoral alliances are allowed.

== Electoral alliances ==
=== Electoral Alliance 1 ===
Party		Political alignment
C	Conservatives	Centre-right
O	Danish People's Party	Right-wing to Far-right

=== Electoral Alliance 2 ===
Party		Political alignment
F	Green Left	Centre-left to Left-wing
Ø	Red–Green Alliance	Left-wing to Far-Left

=== Electoral Alliance 3 ===
Party		Political alignment
B	Social Liberals	Centre to Centre-left
M	Skive-Listen	Local politics

== Results by polling station ==
Division	A	B	C	D	F	M	O	V	Æ	Ø
Division	%	%	%	%	%	%	%	%	%	%
Aakjær	33.4	3.5	4.6	4.1	7.9	8.7	3.0	32.4	0.3	2.3
Skivehus	29.0	3.3	5.5	2.9	7.7	6.7	1.8	41.7	0.2	1.1
Brårup	36.8	2.5	4.1	2.6	7.6	11.0	2.9	30.0	0.2	2.3
Højslev	22.6	1.5	9.4	3.3	4.7	5.2	2.4	48.7	0.6	1.6
Ørslevkloster	16.6	1.9	4.4	2.4	5.0	1.3	2.8	61.8	0.6	3.3
Rønbjerg	42.2	2.4	4.6	4.4	3.8	4.4	3.3	32.5	0.4	2.0
Hem	33.9	1.2	2.8	5.5	5.5	5.4	3.8	39.9	1.6	0.5
Lem-Vejby	37.0	1.8	2.6	3.8	7.3	2.2	5.5	37.8	1.0	1.0
Lihme	31.2	1.9	4.4	3.1	16.5	0.7	1.9	39.0	0.2	1.0
Oddense - Otting	20.7	1.7	1.5	4.1	5.0	0.6	1.5	63.5	0.0	1.5
Rødding	40.9	0.4	2.0	3.0	6.5	1.7	3.8	40.9	0.1	0.9
Glyngøre	21.0	1.6	3.8	9.3	7.2	0.7	2.7	52.5	0.0	1.0
Durup	25.3	1.4	5.7	7.8	4.9	2.0	3.8	48.0	0.3	0.8
Breum	21.1	1.6	2.6	4.4	6.1	2.5	3.0	57.2	0.3	1.1
Balling	39.4	1.6	2.4	3.2	8.0	1.3	2.3	41.0	0.3	0.4
Jebjerg-Lyby	40.8	1.6	2.9	4.0	4.5	1.6	5.3	36.9	0.4	1.7
Roslev	32.6	1.7	2.3	6.7	5.5	1.2	3.3	45.0	0.2	1.4
Håsum-Ramsing	40.5	0.5	4.3	4.6	5.8	1.7	4.6	35.9	0.5	1.7
Selde	23.3	1.4	3.4	9.3	6.5	2.4	3.7	47.6	0.4	2.0
Fur	18.0	4.4	2.6	3.5	10.0	0.2	1.9	57.4	0.2	1.9

== Results ==
Party		Votes	%	+/-	Seats	+/-
Skive Municipality
V	Venstre	10,619	41.60	+5.27	12	+1
A	Social Democrats	7,791	30.52	-0.18	8	-1
F	Green Left	1,758	6.89	+1.44	2	0
M	Skive-Listen	1,336	5.23	-3.56	2	0
C	Conservatives	1,137	4.45	+2.30	1	+1
D	New Right	1,058	4.14	New	1	New
O	Danish People's Party	741	2.90	-4.97	1	-1
B	Social Liberals	583	2.28	-1.05	0	-1
Ø	Red-Green Alliance	417	1.63	+0.27	0	0
Æ	Freedom List	85	0.33	New	0	New
Total		25,525	100	N/A	27	N/A
Invalid votes		67	0.18	-0.01		
Blank votes		311	0.85	+0.06		
Turnout		25,903	71.08	-4.13		
Source: valg.dk
