= Breum, Denmark =

Breum
- Village
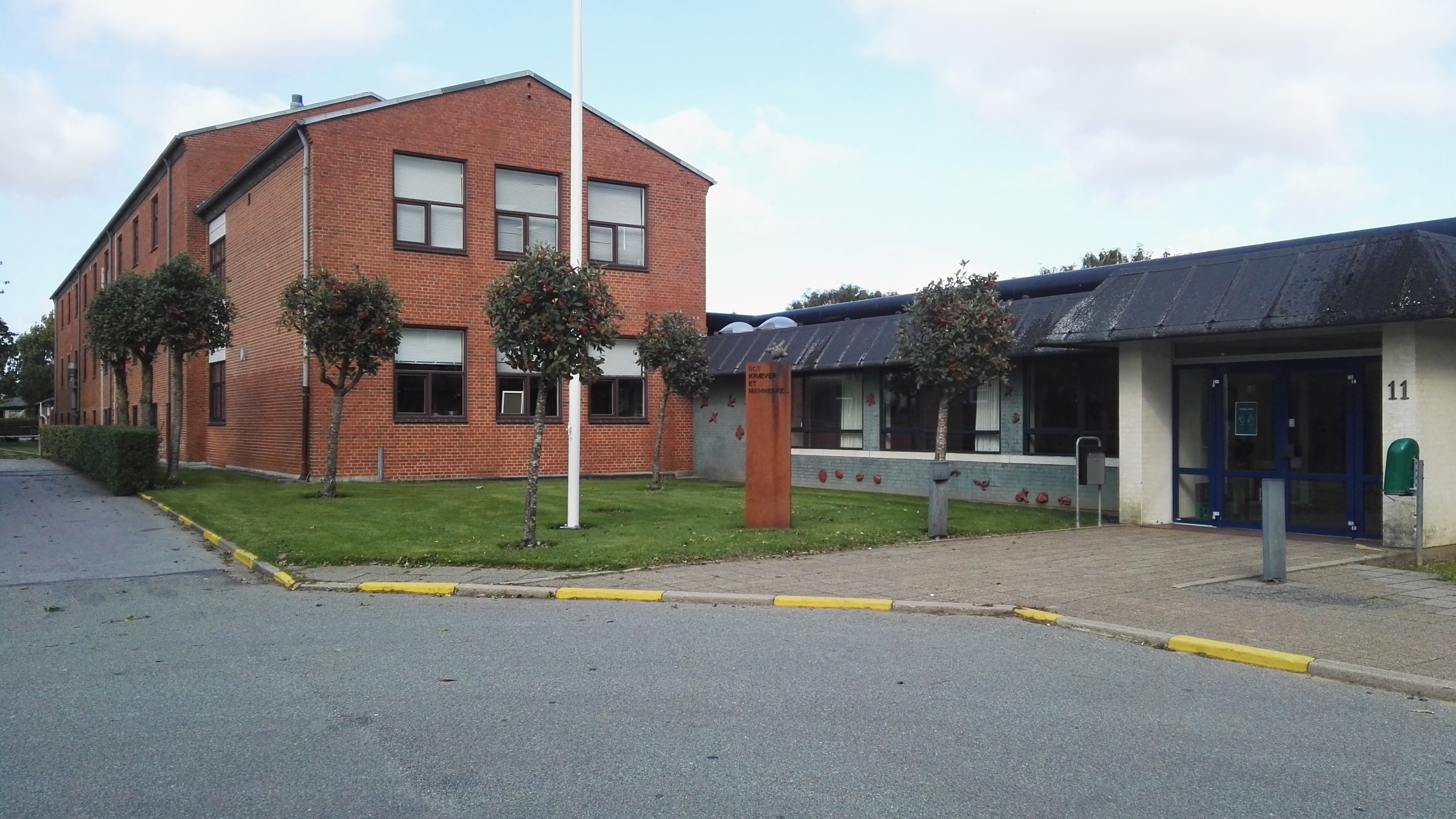
- Breum School

- Location in Central Denmark Region Breum (Denmark)
- Coordinates: 56.68747°N 9.07199°E
- Country: Denmark
- Region: Central Denmark
- Municipality: Skive

Population (2026)
  - Total: 819

Breum is a village, with a population of 819 (1 January 2026), in Skive Municipality, Central Denmark Region in Denmark. It is situated on the Salling peninsula 8 km southwest of Sundsøre 9 km southeast of Roslev and 15 km north of Skive.

Breum was the municipal seat of the former Sundsøre Municipality until 1. January 2007.

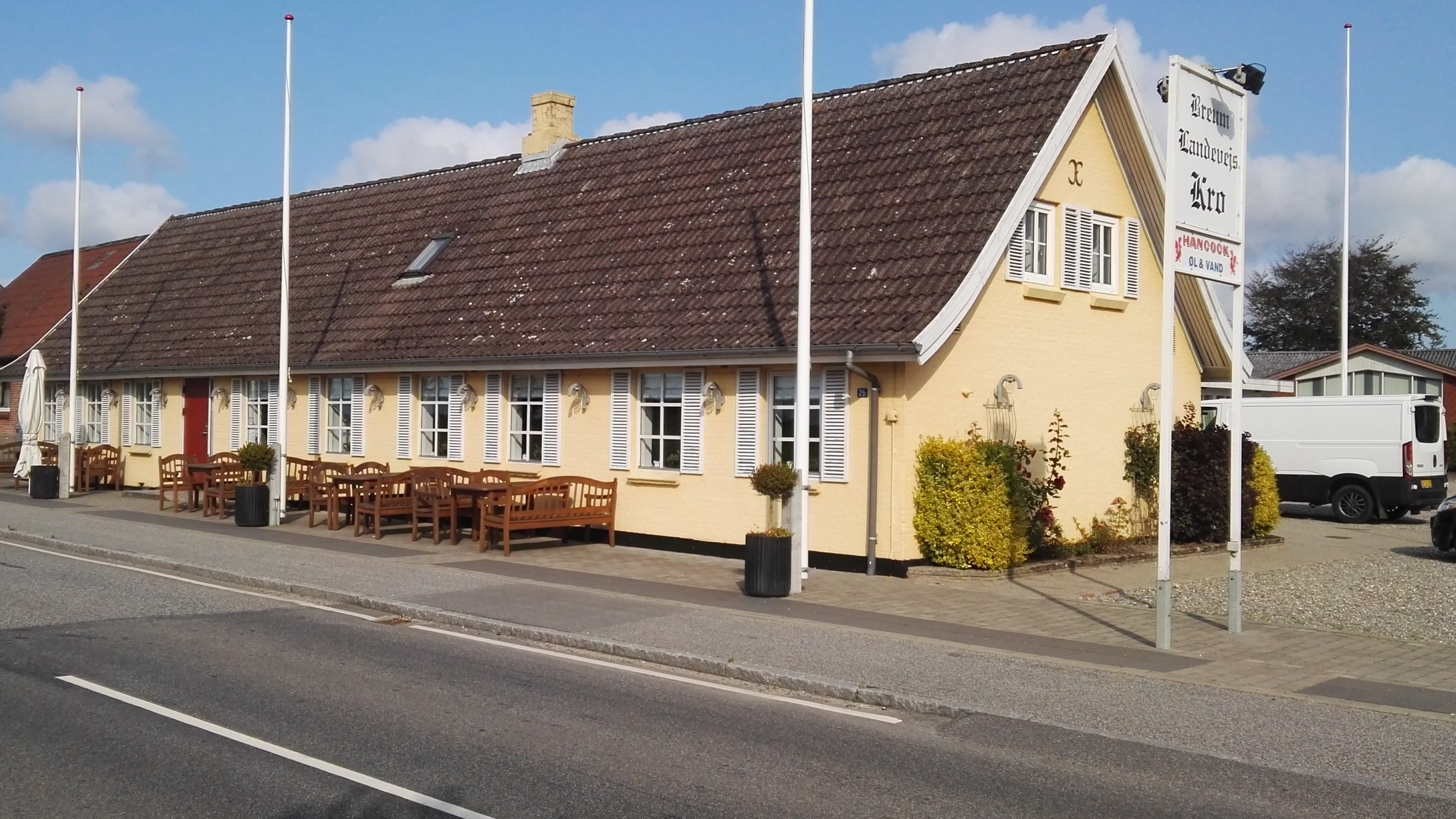
Breum Landevejskro (Breum roadside Inn)

Breum Landevejskro is a roadside Inn located in the village.
