= Højslev railway station =

Railway station in Jutland, Denmark

Højslev
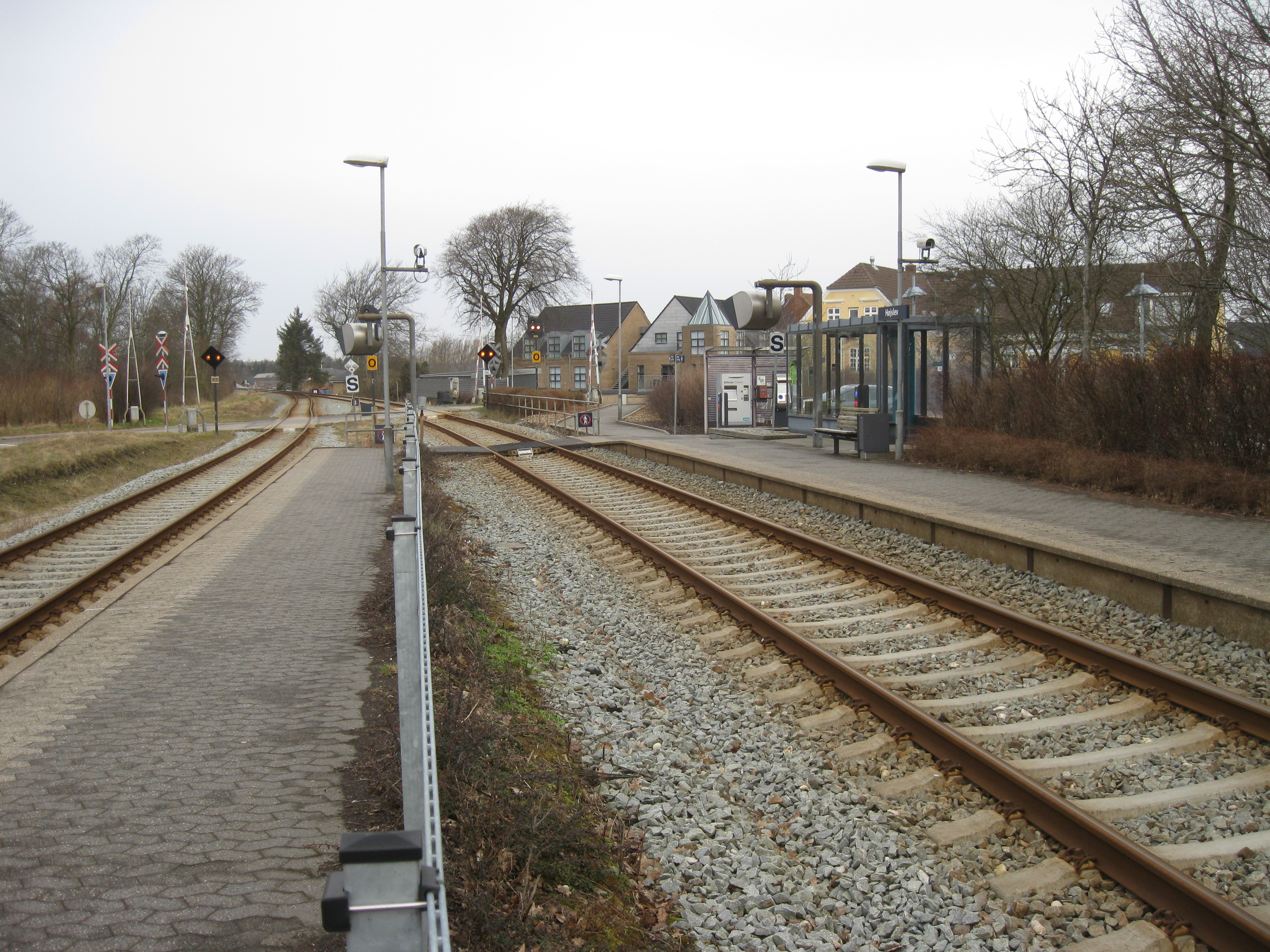
- Højslev station in 2015

General information
- Location: Søbyvej 1A; 7840 Højslev; Skive Municipality; Denmark
- Coordinates: 56°32′58″N 9°6′36″E
- Elevation: 2.9 metres (9 ft 6 in)
- Owner: Banedanmark
- Line: Langå–Struer
- Platforms: 2
- Tracks: 2
- Train operators: DSB

History
- Opened: 17 October 1864

Services
Preceding station	DSB Vores Tog	Following station
Stoholm towards Århus H	Aarhus–Struer Regional train	Skive towards Struer
Location
- Location within Denmark Location within Central Denmark Region

Højslev station is a railway station serving the railway town of Højslev Stationsby in Jutland, Denmark.

Højslev station is located on the Langå–Struer railway line from Langå to Struer. The station was opened in 1864 with the opening of the Viborg–Skive section of the Langå–Struer Line. It offers direct regional train services to Aarhus and Struer operated by the national railway company DSB

== History ==
Højslev station opened on 17 October 1864 with the opening of the Viborg–Skive section of the Langå–Struer railway line. In 1865, the railway line was continued from Skive to Struer. In 1973 the station was closed but continues as a railway halt.

== See also ==
- List of railway stations in Denmark
