= Skive railway station =

Railway station in Jutland, Denmark

Skive
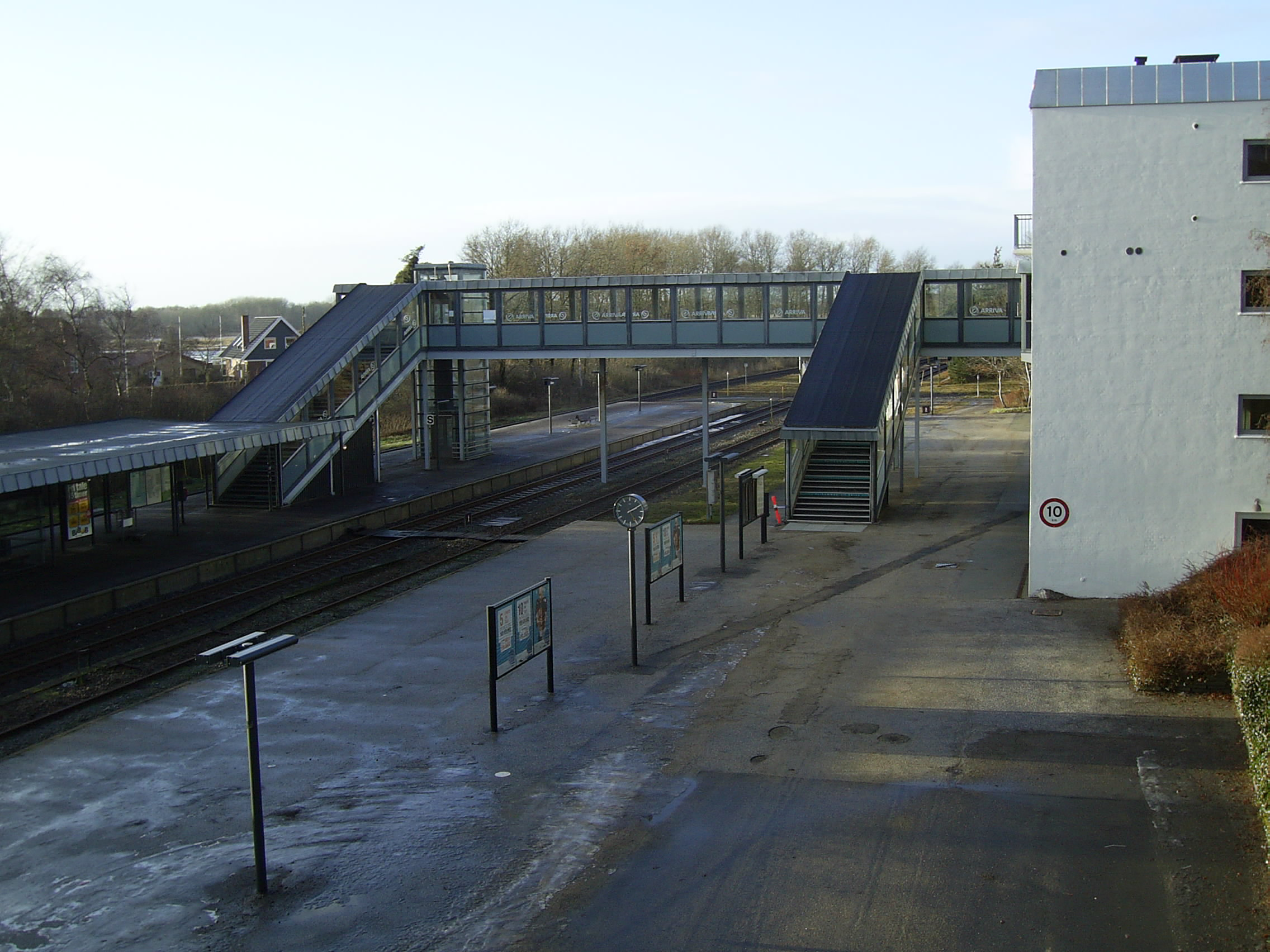
- Skive railway station in 2011

General information
- Location: Søndergade 16C; 7800 Skive; Skive Municipality; Denmark
- Coordinates: 56°33′42″N 9°1′34″E
- Elevation: 7.1 metres (23 ft)
- Owner: DSB (station infrastructure); Banedanmark (rail infrastructure)
- Lines: Langå–Struer; Salling Line (closed 1979); West Salling Line (closed 1966)
- Platforms: 2
- Tracks: 2
- Train operators: DSB

Construction
- Architect: Niels Peder Christian Holsøe (1864); Ole Ejnar Bonding (1962)

History
- Opened: 17 October 1864
- Rebuilt: 1962

Services
Preceding station	DSB Vores Tog	Following station
Højslev towards Århus H	Aarhus–Struer Regional train	Vinderup towards Struer
Location
- Location within Denmark Location within Central Denmark Region

Skive station is a railway station serving the town of Skive in Jutland, Denmark.

Skive station is located on the Langå–Struer railway line from Langå to Struer in the center of the town.

The station was opened in 1864 with the opening of the Viborg–Skive section of the Langå–Struer Line.

It offers direct regional train services to Aarhus and Struer.

The train services are operated by the national railway company DSB.

== History ==
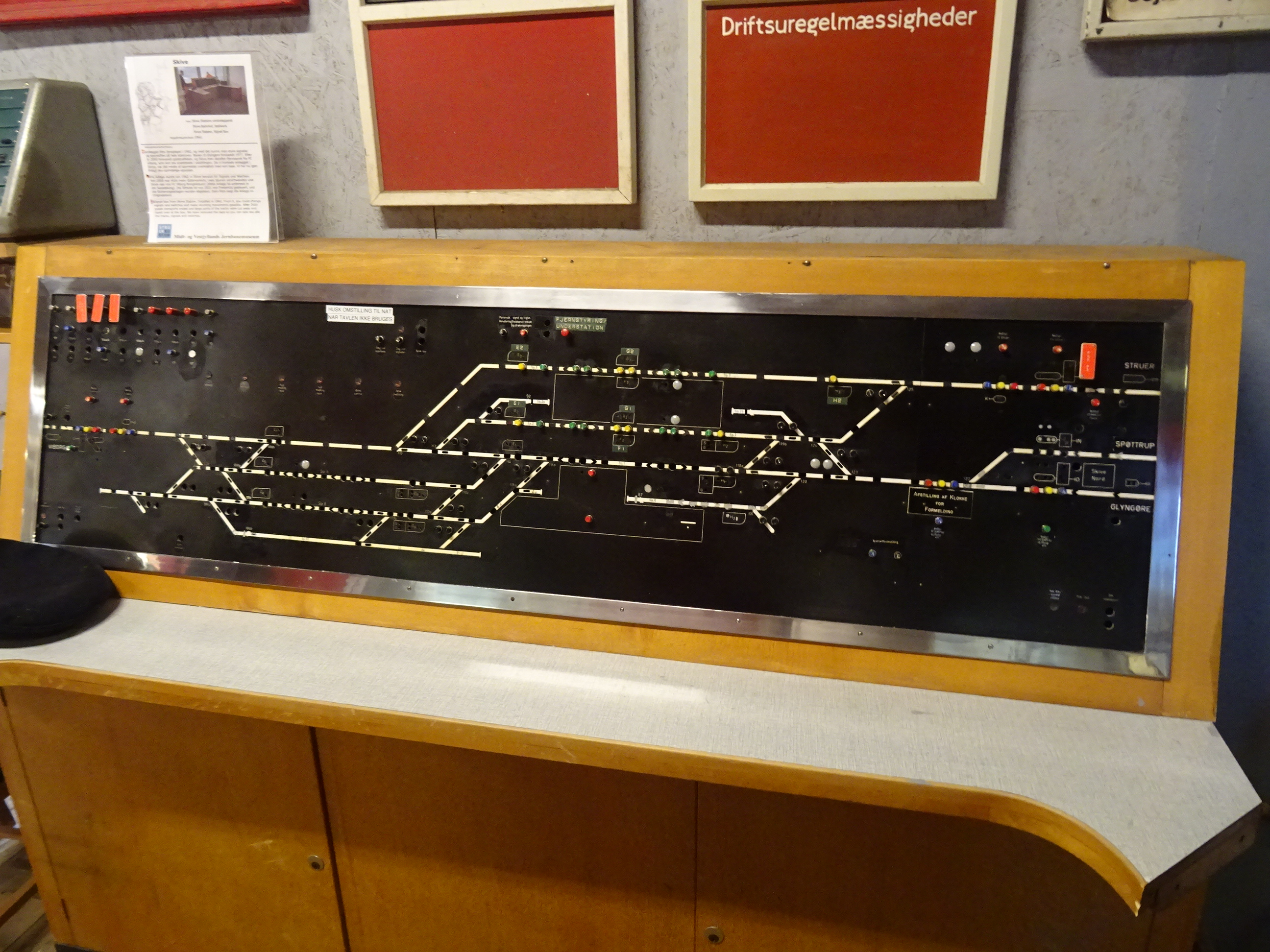
Interlocking machines from Skive Station in Midt- og Vestjyllands Jernbanemuseum in Struer, Denmark.

Skive station opened on 17 October 1864 to serve as a temporary terminus of the Viborg–Skive section of the Langå–Struer railway line. In 1865, the railway line was continued to Struer.

In 1884, Skive station also became the southern terminus of the new Salling railway line from Skive to Glyngøre, which connected with the ferries to Nykøbing Mors on the island of Mors. Due to the increasing traffic, Skive's first station became too small and had to be expanded. It was decided to build a new station, and Skive's second station was taken into use on September 28, 1888. Its station building was located a short distance east of Skive's first station. In 1924, the new West Salling railway line opened from Skive to Spøttrup.

The original Skive station was a terminal station, and trains arriving there had to end their journeys (terminate) or reverse out of the station. In 1962, however, the station was moved to its present location, changed to a through station, and the current station building was built. The third and current station building opened on 2 February 1962 and was designed by the Danish architect Ole Ejnar Bording.

The West Salling Line was closed in 1966. Passenger traffic on the Salling Line stopped in 1971, with freight service on the line between Skive and Nykøbing Mors continuing until 1977 and between Skive and Glyngøre until 1979.

== Architecture ==
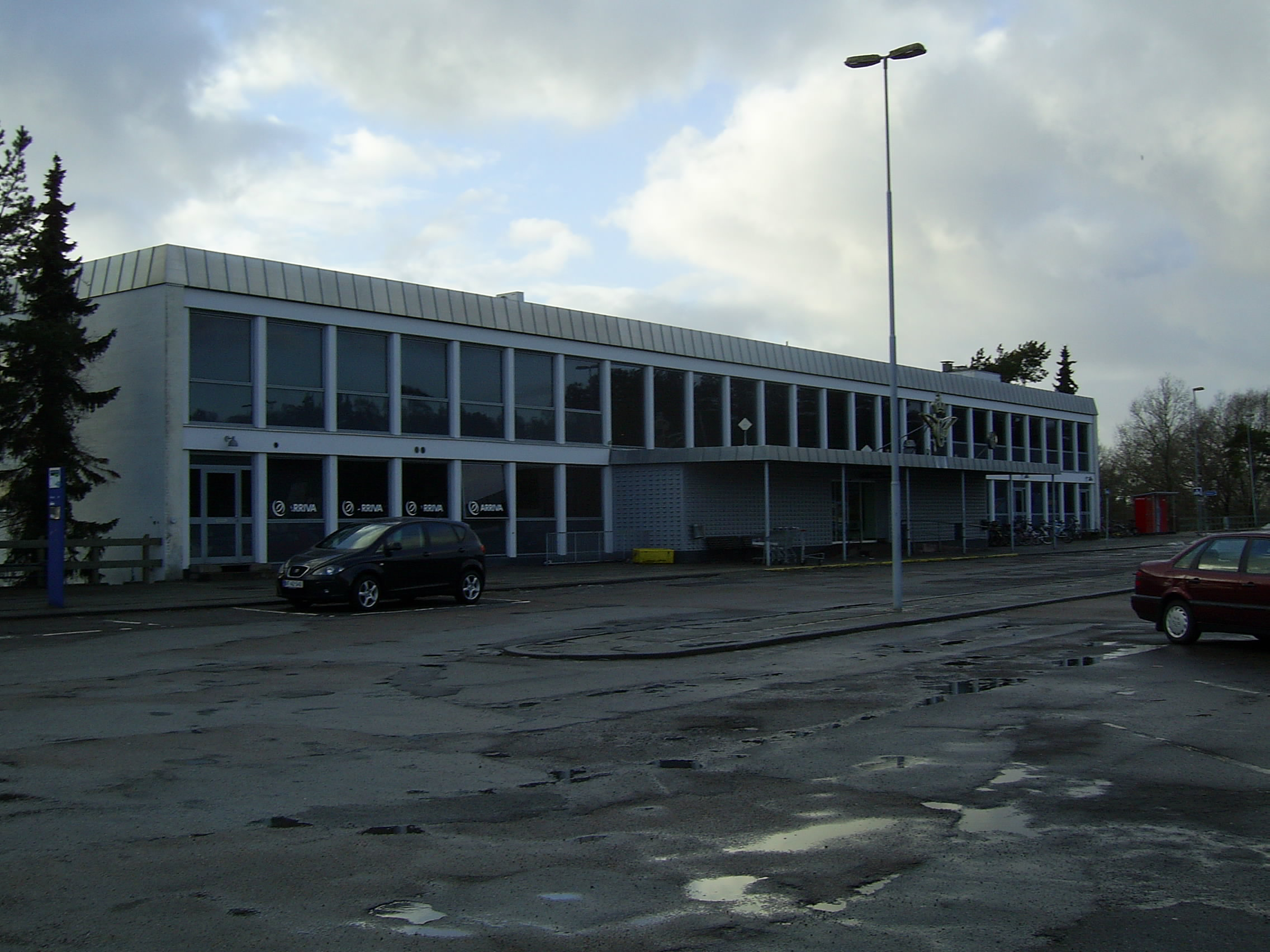
Street facade of the station building in 2011.

The original station building was designed by the Danish architect Niels Peder Christian Holsøe. It was replaced by the second station building in 1888, and torn down at the start of the 20th century.

The third and current station building was designed by the Danish architect Ole Ejnar Bonding in his capacity of head architect of the Danish State Railways from 1958 to 1979. It is in the same uncompromising modernist architectural style as Bonding's other station buildings in Kalundborg, Nykøbing Falster, Vojens, Brønderslev, Rødekro, Holbæk, Svanemøllen and Herning.

== Operations ==
The train services at the station are operated by the national train operating company DSB. The station offers direct regional train services to Aarhus and Struer.

== See also ==
- List of railway stations in Denmark
- Rail transport in Denmark
- History of rail transport in Denmark
- Transport in Denmark
