= Sæby (disambiguation) =

Sæby may refer to several towns and villages in Denmark:

- Sæby, a town and seaport in Frederikshavn municipality, Jutland.
- Sæby, Kalundborg municipality, a small village on the brink of lake Tissø in Kalundborg municipality, Zealand.
- Sæby, Lejre municipality, a small village near Kirke Hyllinge in Lejre municipality on Zealand.
- Sæby Kirke, a small countryside church near Glyngøre in Skive municipality, Jutland

Elsewhere:

- Sønder Sæby is the name of the former fishing village where Landskrona is today

In Sweden, Säby refers to several places
