= Hem, Denmark =

Hem
- Village
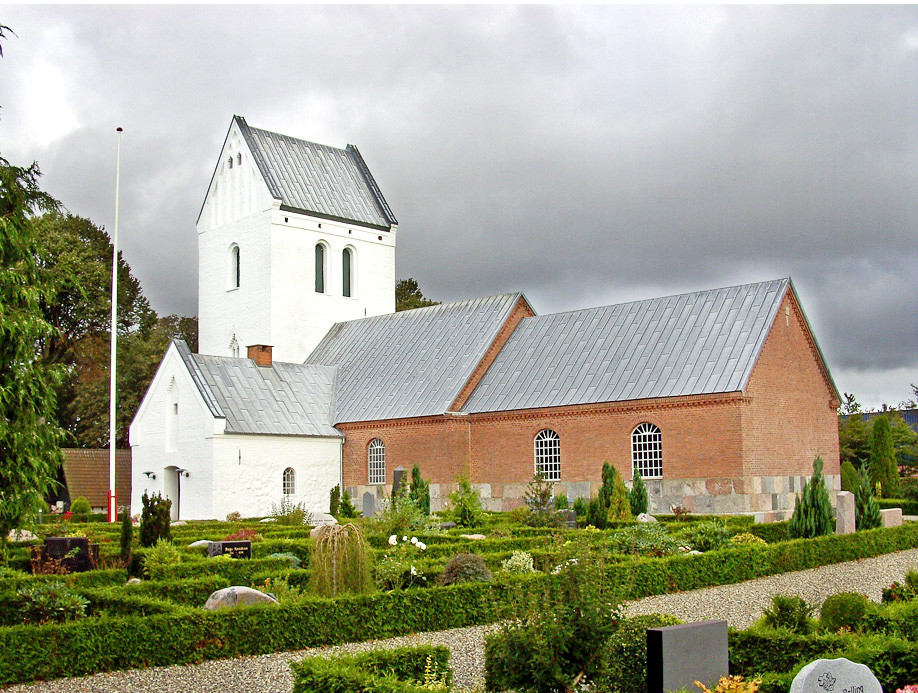
- Hem Church

- Location in Central Denmark Region Hem (Denmark)
- Coordinates: 56°35′47″N 8°57′30″E
- Country: Denmark
- Region: Central Denmark (Midtjylland)
- Municipality: Skive Municipality

Population (2026)
  - Total: 590

Hem is a village, with a population of 590 (1 January 2026), in Skive Municipality, Central Denmark Region in Denmark. It is situated on the Salling peninsula 14 km south of Roslev, 30 km southeast of Nykøbing Mors and 6 km northwest of Skive.

Hem Church is located in the village.
