= Jebjerg =

- Town
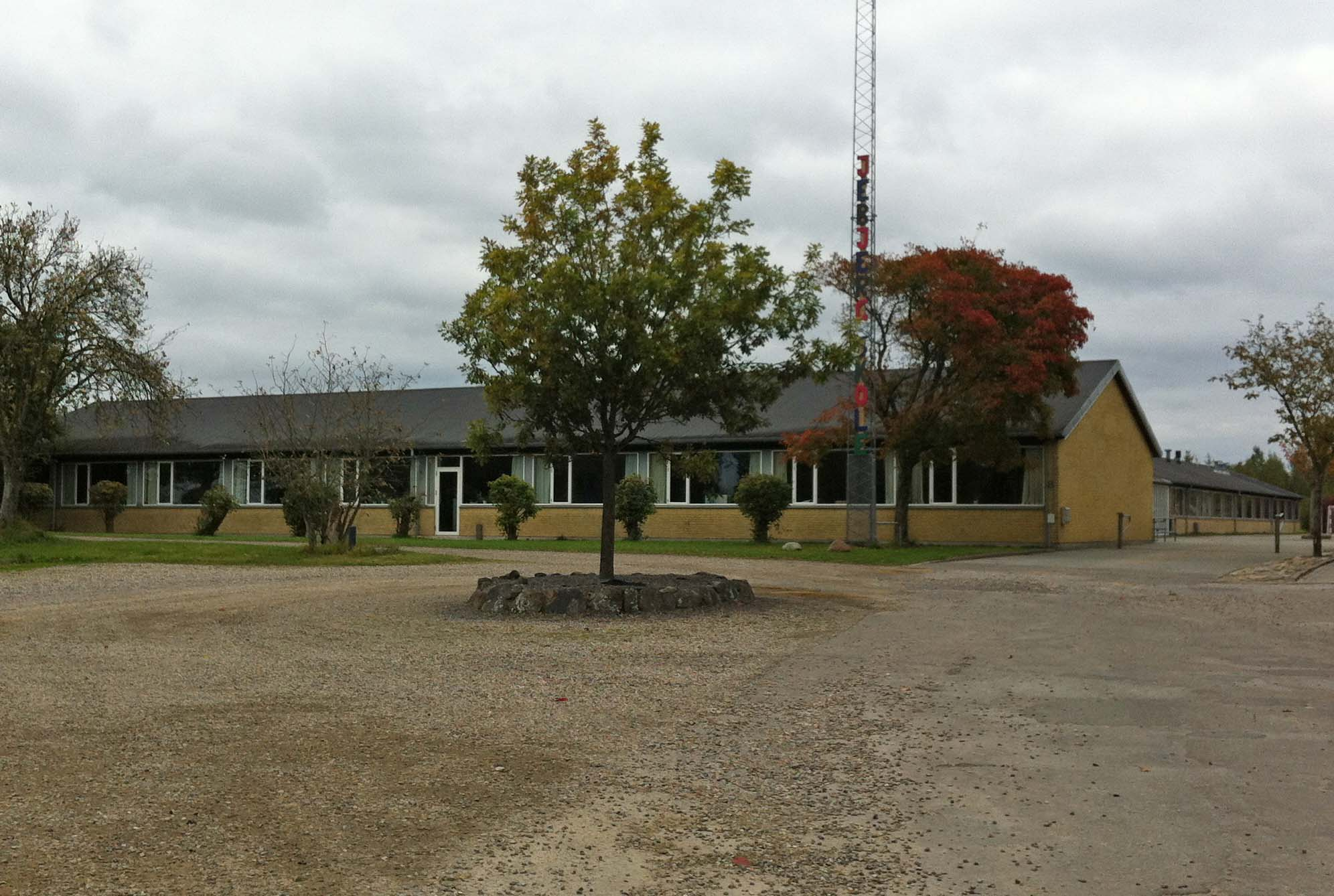
- Jebjerg School

- Location within Denmark Location within Central Denmark Region
- Coordinates: 56°40′18″N 9°0′56″E
- Country: Denmark
- Region: Central Denmark ("Midtjylland")
- Municipality: Skive Municipality

Area
  - Urban: 1.1 km^{2} (0.42 sq mi)

Population (2026)
  - Urban: 1,056
  - Urban density: 960/km^{2} (2,500/sq mi)
- Time zone: UTC+1 (CET)
  - Summer (DST): UTC+2 (CEST)
- Postal code: DK-7870 Roslev

Jebjerg is a small town, with a population of 1,056 (1 January 2026), in Skive Municipality, Central Denmark Region in Denmark. It is situated on the Salling peninsula 5 km southeast of Roslev 14 km north of Skive and 23 km southeast of Nykøbing Mors.

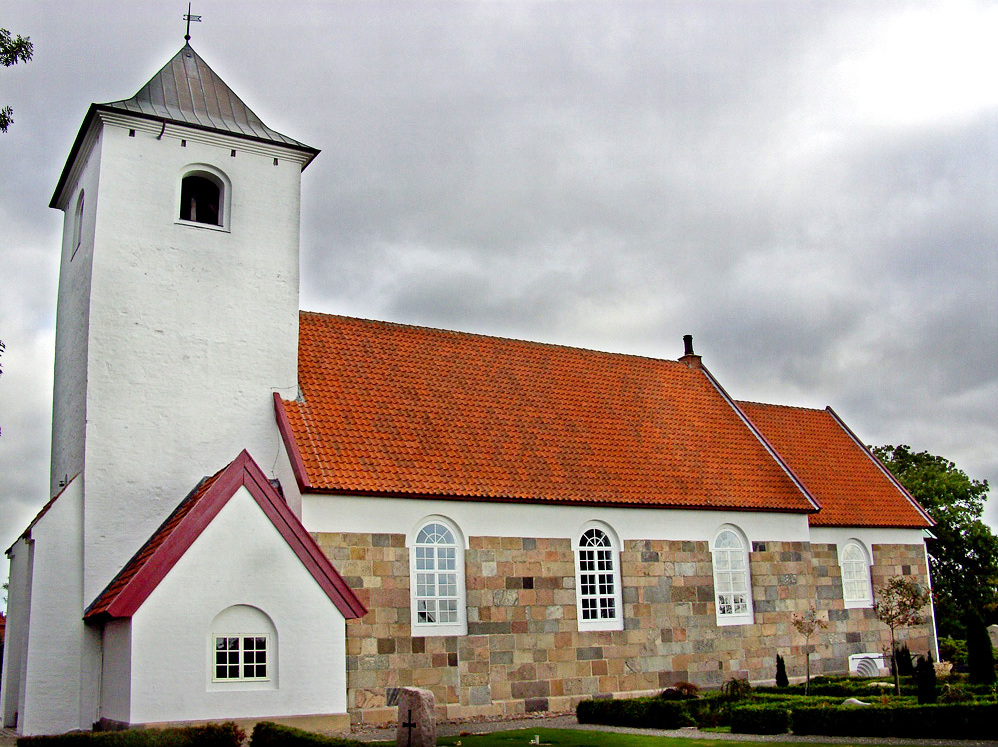
Jebjerg Church

Jebjerg Church, built in Neoromanesque style during 1923–24, is located in the town.

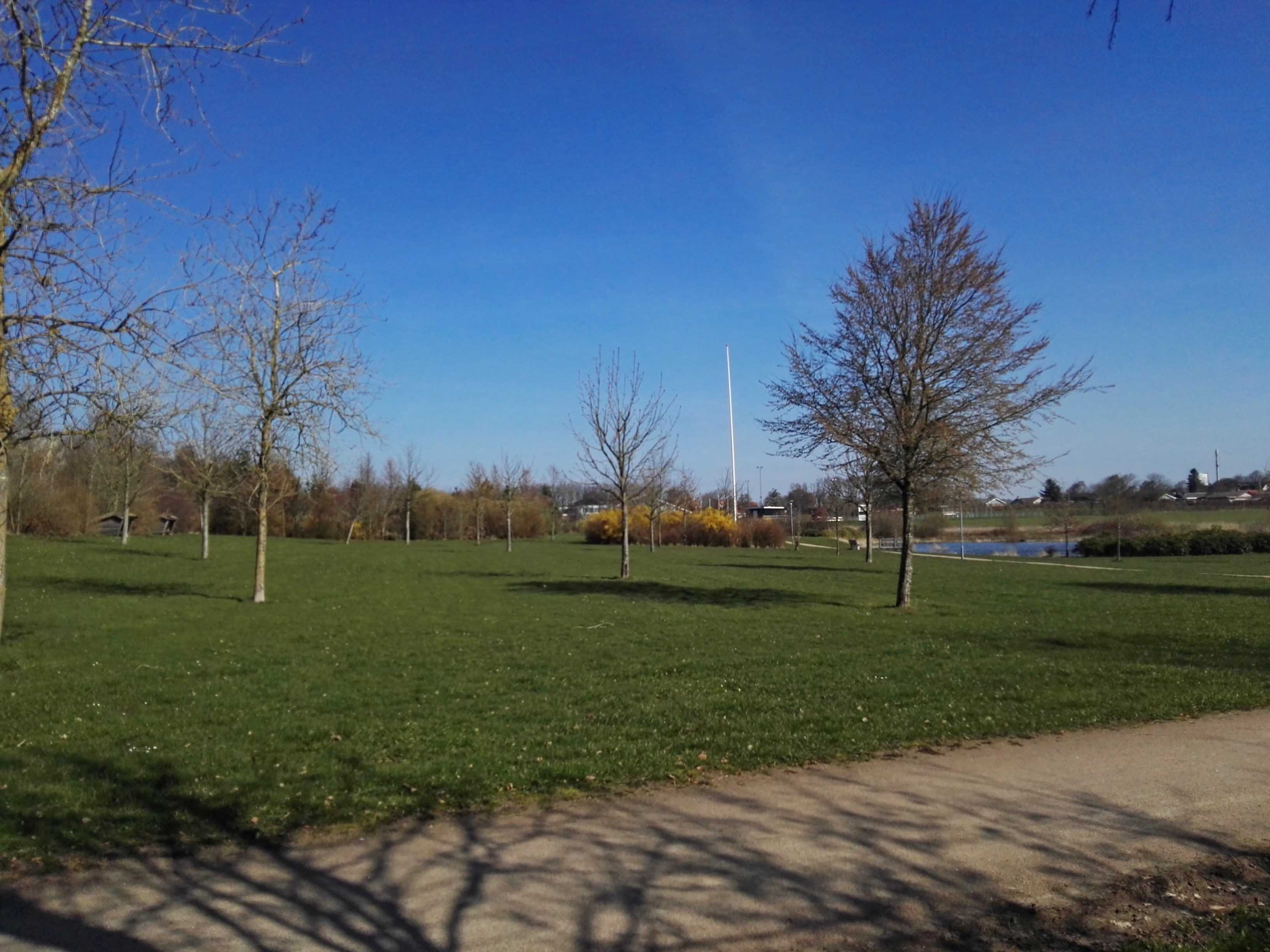
Jebjerg Bypark (Jebjerg town park)

Jebjerg Bypark is a recreational area established by a group of local residents. A sculpture of one of the eight "Salling Girls" stands in the park.
