= Durup =

- Village
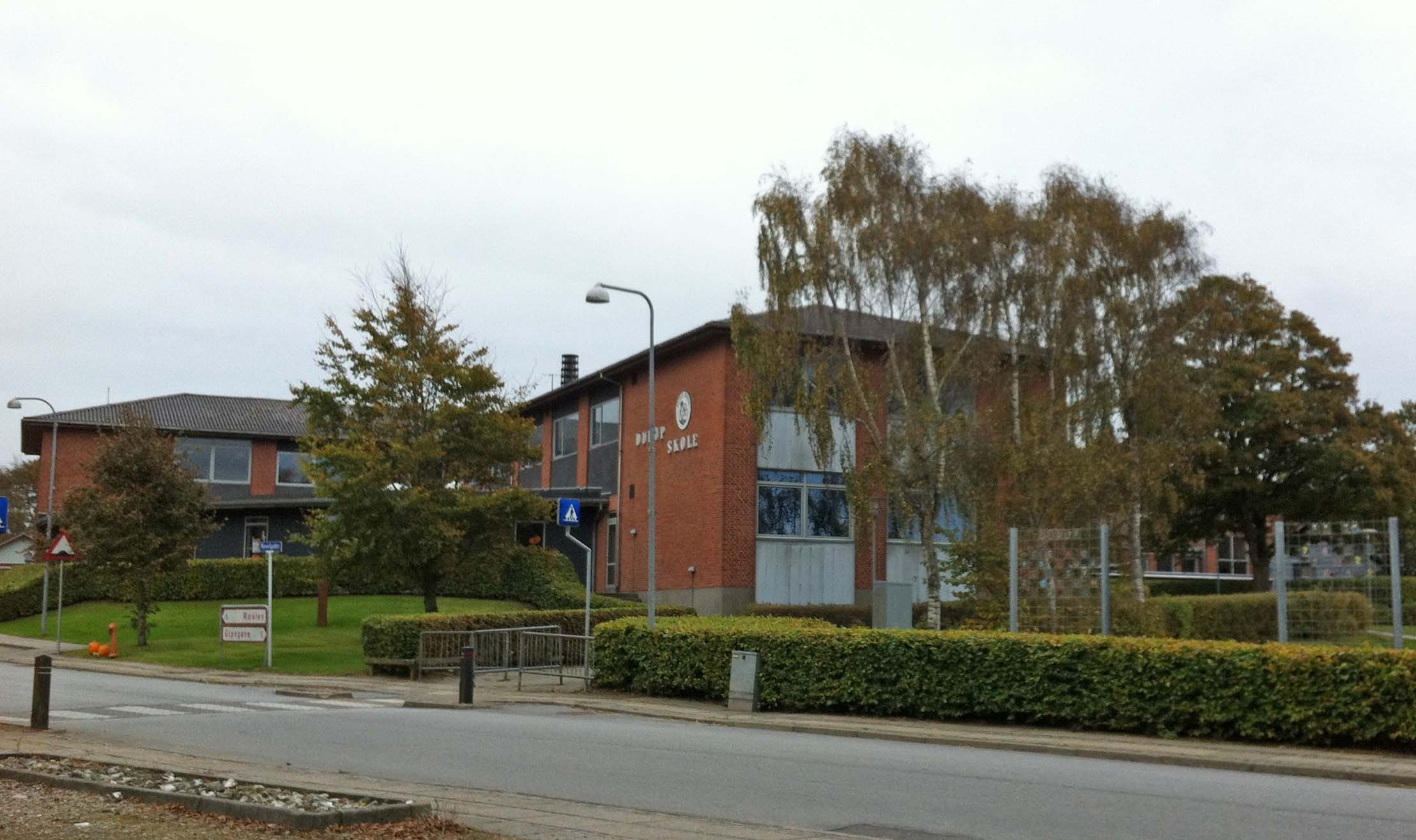
- Durup School

- Location in Denmark Durup (Denmark)
- Coordinates: 56°44′37″N 8°57′2″E
- Country: Denmark
- Region: Central Denmark (Midtjylland)
- Municipality: Skive Municipality

Population (2026)
  - Total: 884

Durup is a village, with a population of 884 (1 January 2026), in Skive Municipality, Central Denmark Region in Denmark. It is situated on the Salling peninsula 6 km northwest of Roslev, 6 km east of Glyngøre, 15 km southeast of Nykøbing Mors and 23 km north of Skive.

Durup was the municipal seat of the former Sallingsund Municipality until 1 January 2007.

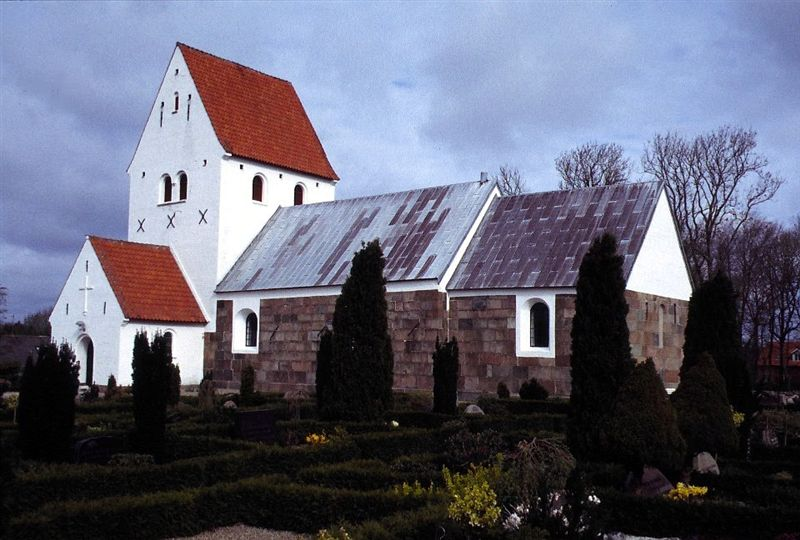
Durup Church

Durup Church is located in the village.
