= Lihme =

- Village
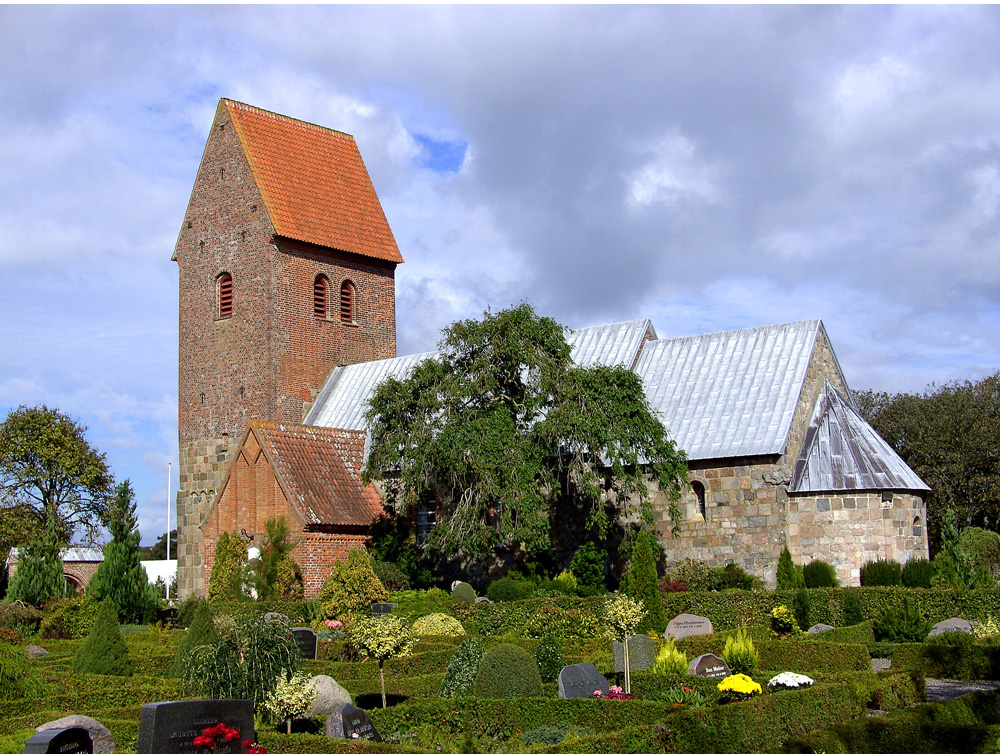
- Lihme Church

- Location in Central Denmark Region Lihme (Denmark)
- Coordinates: 56°36′2″N 8°43′53″E
- Country: Denmark
- Region: Central Denmark (Midtjylland)
- Municipality: Skive

Population (2026)
  - Total: 255
- Time zone: UTC+1 (Central European Time)
  - Summer (DST): UTC+2 (Central European Summer Time)

Lihme is a village in Skive Municipality, Central Denmark Region in Denmark. It is located 12 km west of Balling, 24 km southwest of Roslev and 20 km west of Skive.

Lihme Church from about 1100 is located in the village. It is one of the oldest Romanesque village churches in Denmark consecrated to Sct. Vincentius in 1176.
