= Sallingsund Municipality =

Former municipality in Denmark

Until 1 January 2007 Sallingsund municipality was a municipality (Danish, kommune) in the former Viborg County in the northwest of the Salling Peninsula, a part of the larger Jutland peninsula in northwest Denmark. The municipality covered an area of 99 km^{2}, and had a total population of 6,083 (2005). Its last mayor was Jens Jørn Justesen, a member of the Venstre (Liberal Party) political party. The municipal seat was the town of Durup.

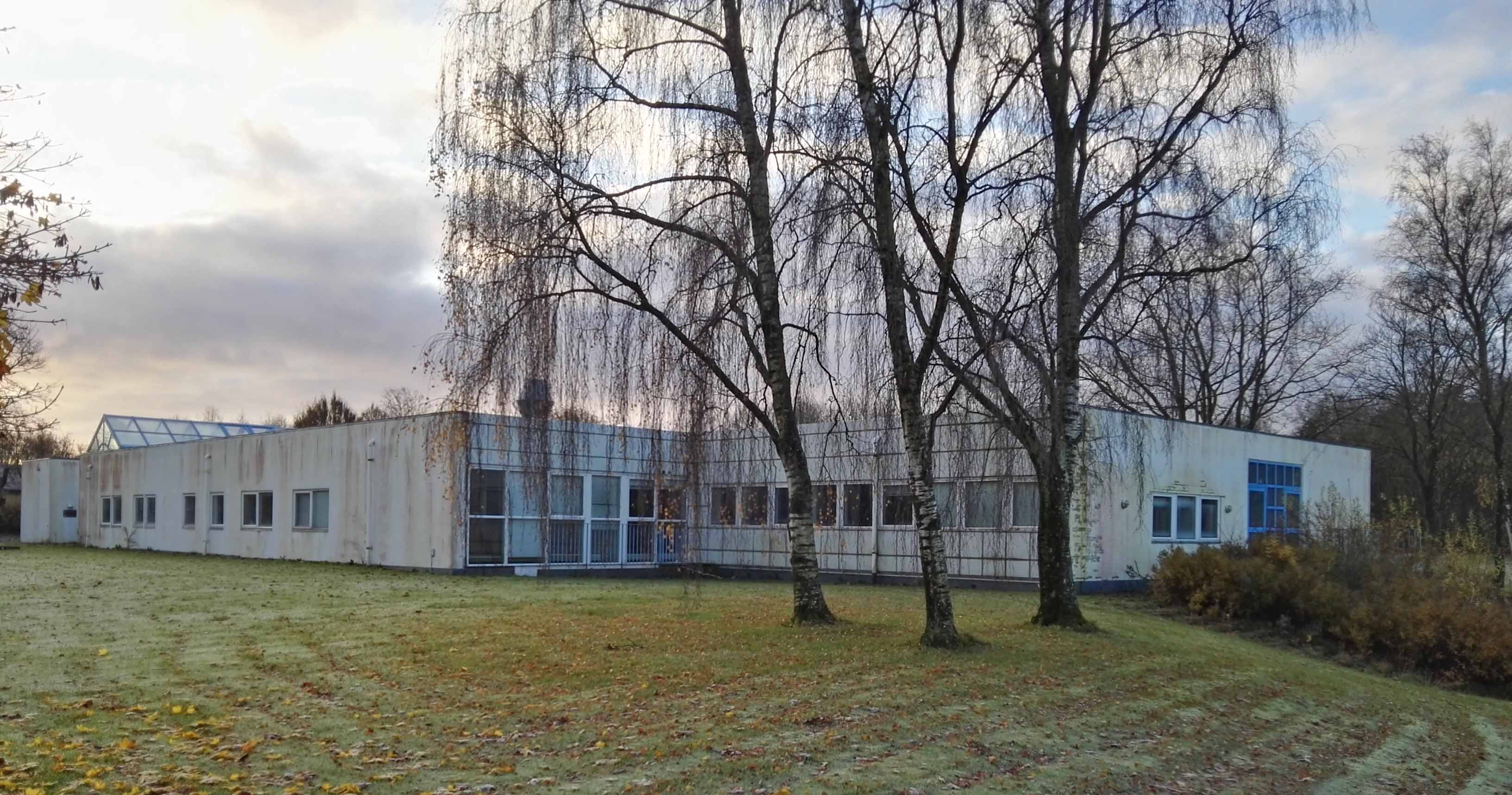
The former townhall of Sallingsund Municipality in Durup

The 1,717 meter long Sallingsund Bridge, which opened on 30 May 1978, connects the towns of Sallingsund to the town of Nykøbing Mors on the island of Mors, and then continues northwest to the island of Vendsyssel-Thy. Before the bridge was built there was a train ferry connection over the strait from the town of Glyngøre to Nykøbing on the ship Pinen og Plagen ("The Torment and the Plague").

Sallingsund municipality was, as the result of Kommunalreformen ("The Municipality Reform" of 2007), merged with Spøttrup, Sundsøre and Skive municipalities to form the new Skive municipality. This created a municipality with an area of 682 km^{2} and a total population of 48,368 (2005). The new municipality belongs to Region Midtjylland ("Mid-Jutland Region").
