= Sundsøre Municipality =

Former municipality in Denmark

Coordinates: 56°42′11″N 8°59′01″E

Until 1 January 2007 Sundsøre municipality was a municipality (Danish, kommune) in the former Viborg County on the Salling Peninsula, a part of the larger Jutland peninsula in northwest Denmark. The municipality included the island of Fur, and covered an area of 171 km^{2} (66 sq mi). It had a total population of 6,464 (2005). Its last mayor is Flemming Eskildsen, a member of the Venstre (Liberal Party) political party.

The main town and the site of its municipal council was the town of Breum.

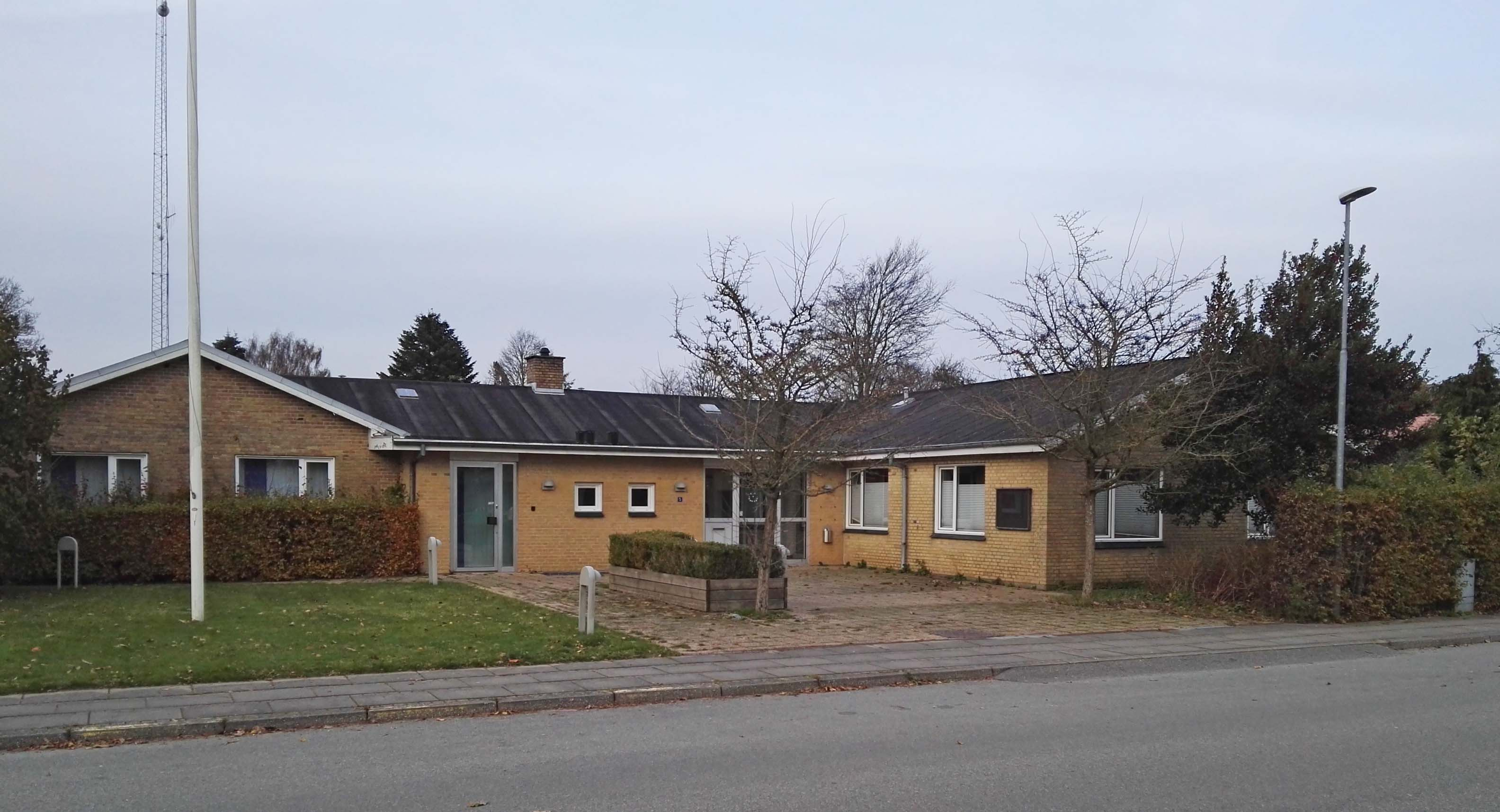
The former townhall of Sundsøre Municipality in Breum

To the north are the waters of the Limfjord, Fur Strait (Fur Sund), and Risgårde Bredning. The former municipality's island of Fur is located north of the mainland in these waters.

Ferry service connects the former municipality near the town of Selde northwest over Fur Strait to the town of Stenøre on the island, and at the town of Sundsøre southeast over Hvalp Strait to the town of Hole.

Sundsøre municipality was, as the result of Kommunalreformen ("The Municipality Reform" of 2007), merged with existing Spøttrup, Sallingsund and Skive municipalities to form the new Skive municipality. This created a municipality with an area of 682 km^{2} (263 sq mi) and a total population of 48,368 (2005). The new municipality belongs to the new Region Midtjylland ("Mid-Jutland Region").
