= Spøttrup Municipality =

Former municipality in Denmark

Coordinates: 56°38′18″N 8°47′08″E

Until 1 January 2007 Spøttrup municipality was a municipality (Danish, kommune) in the former Viborg County on the Salling Peninsula, a part of the larger Jutland peninsula in northwest Denmark. The municipality covered an area of 189 km², and had a total population of 7,902 (2005).

Spøttrup municipality ceased to exist as the result of Kommunalreformen ("The Municipality Reform" of 2007). It was merged with Sallingsund, Skive, and Sundsøre municipalities to form the new Skive municipality. This created a municipality with an area of 682 km² and a total population of 48,368 (2005). The new municipality belongs to Region Midtjylland ("Mid-Jutland Region").

The municipality was named after Spøttrup Castle (Spøttrup Borg).
