= Højslev Stationsby =

- Town
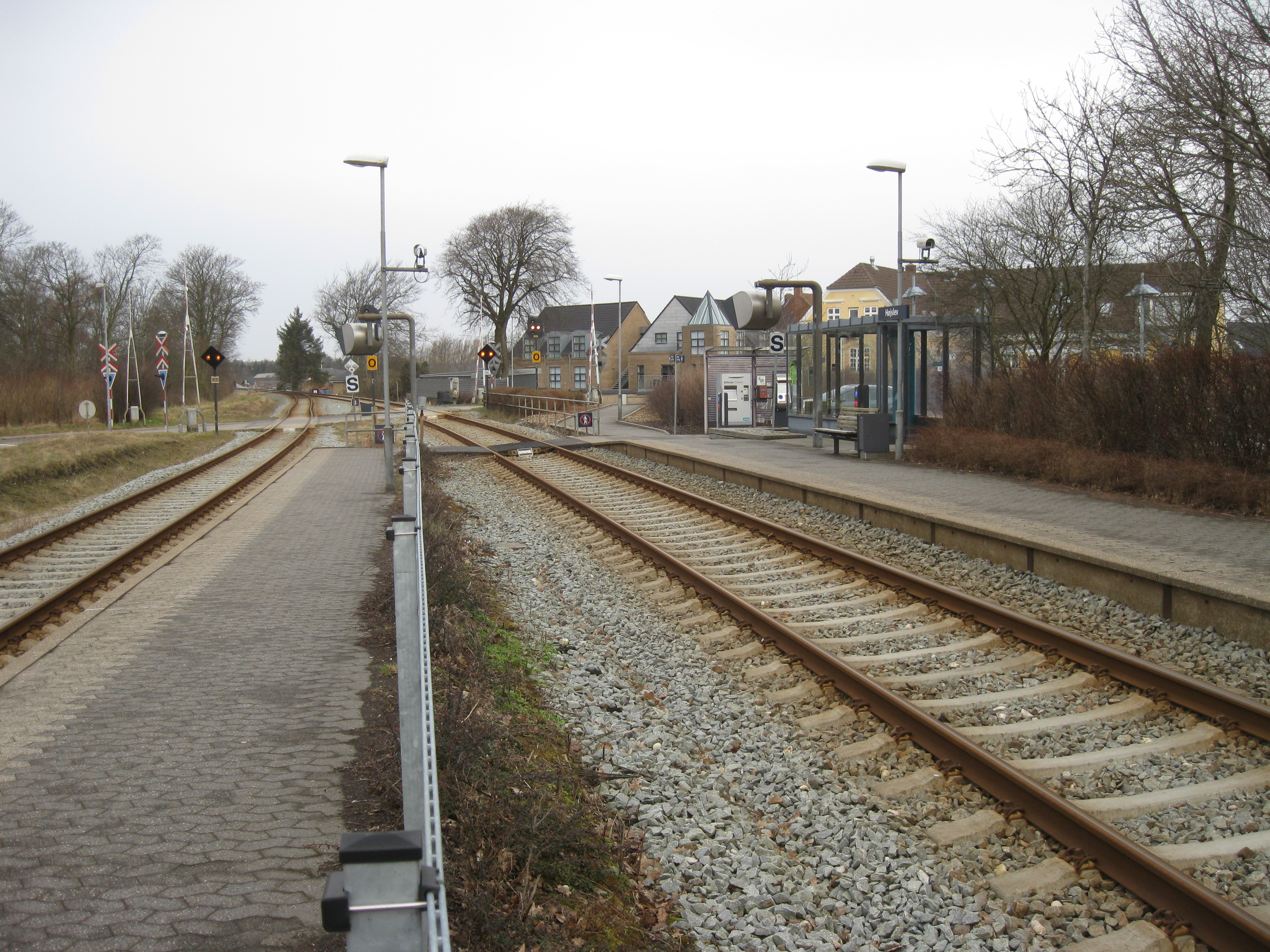
- Højslev railway station

- Location in Denmark Højslev Stationsby (Central Denmark Region)
- Coordinates: 56°33′1″N 9°6′38″E
- Country: Denmark
- Region: Central Denmark (Midtjylland)
- Municipality: Skive Municipality

Area
  - Urban: 2.2 km^{2} (0.85 sq mi)

Population (2026)
  - Urban: 2,791
  - Urban density: 1,300/km^{2} (3,300/sq mi)
- Time zone: UTC+1 (CET)
  - Summer (DST): UTC+2 (CEST)
- Postal code: DK-7840 Højslev

Højslev Stationsby is a railway town and eastern suburb of the town of Skive, with a population of 2,791 (1 January 2026), in Skive Municipality, Central Denmark Region in Denmark. It is located 7 kilometres (4.3 mi) east of Skive, 24 km (15 mi) northwest of Viborg, and 46 km (29 mi) west of Hobro.

Højslev Stationsby is served by Højslev railway station located on the Langå–Struer railway line.

Højslev Church is located in the older village of Højslev, 4 km (2.5 mi) north of the railway town.

Højslev Kro (Højslev Inn) is located in the centre of the railway town.

Skive Airport, a private jet airport, is located 3.5 km (2.2 mi) east of the town.
