= Balling, Denmark =

Town in Central Denmark Region, Denmark

Balling
- Town
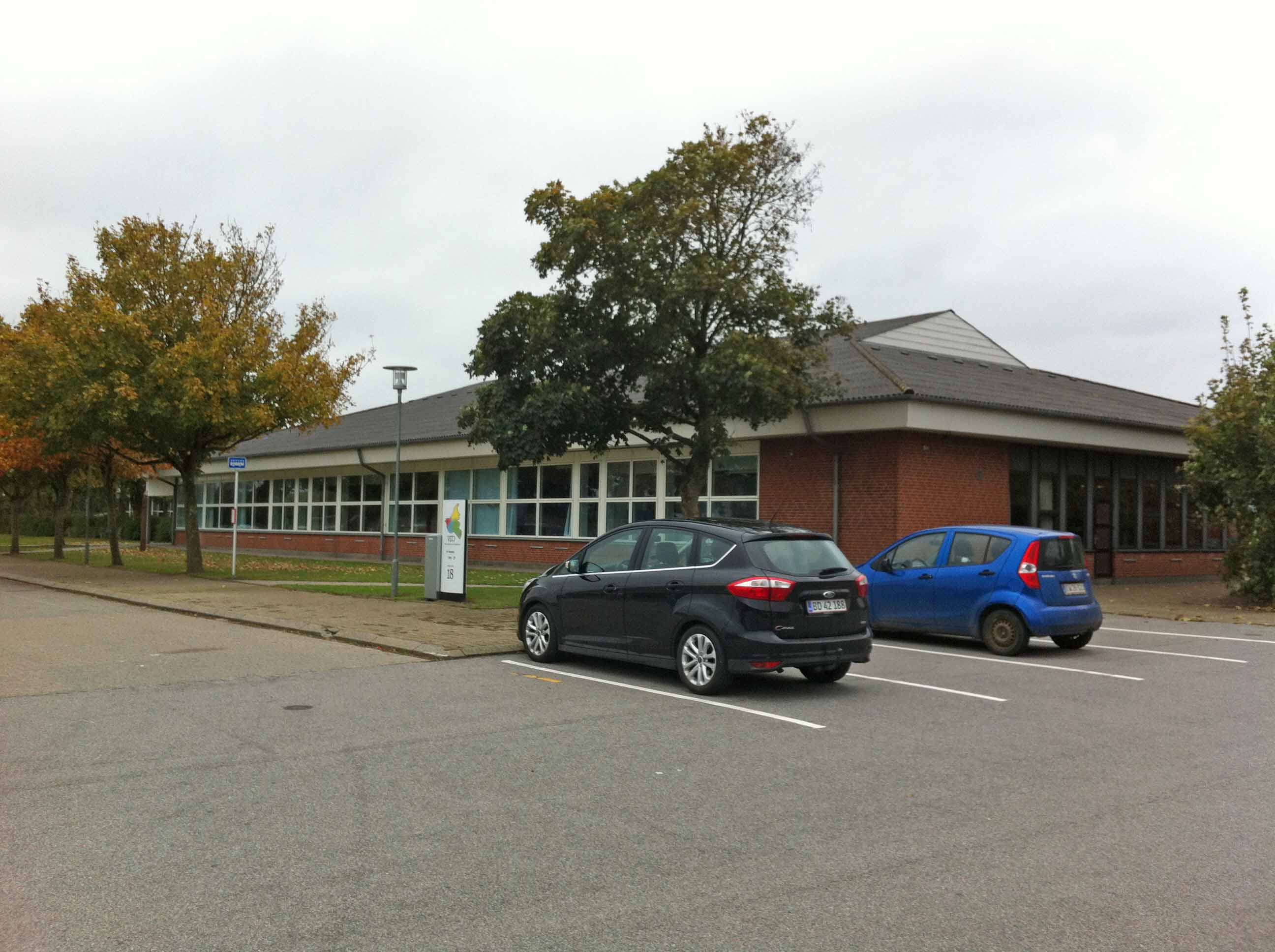
- Balling School

- Location in Denmark Balling (Central Denmark Region)
- Coordinates: 56°36′49″N 8°52′47″E
- Country: Denmark
- Region: Central Denmark (Midtjylland)
- Municipality: Skive Municipality

Area
  - Urban: 1.1 km^{2} (0.42 sq mi)

Population (2026)
  - Urban: 1,166
  - Urban density: 1,100/km^{2} (2,700/sq mi)
- Time zone: UTC+1 (CET)
  - Summer (DST): UTC+2 (CEST)

Balling is a town, with a population of 1,166 (1 January 2026), in Skive Municipality, Central Denmark Region in Denmark. It is situated on the Salling peninsula 34 km northeast of Holstebro and 12 km northwest of Skive.

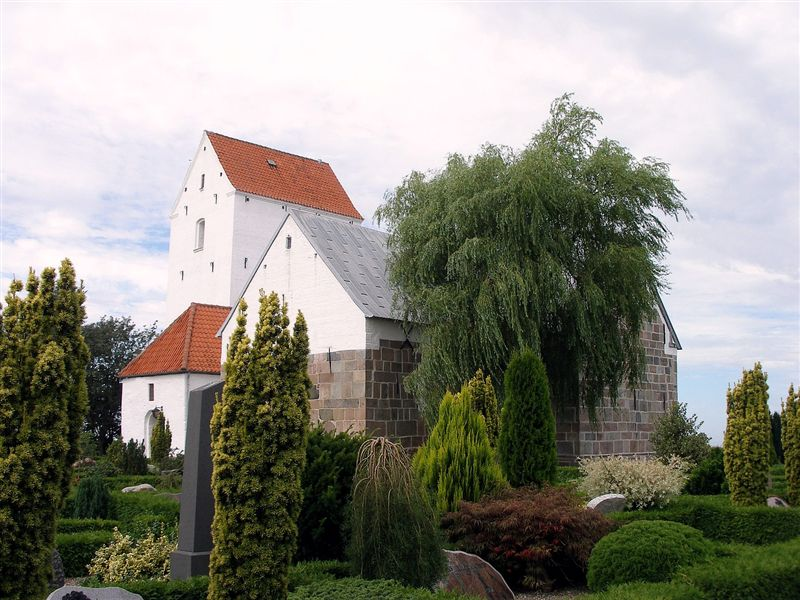
Balling Church

Balling Church is located north of the town. It is built of ashlar and consist of a Romanesque chancel and nave with three extensions.
