= Højslev =

- Village
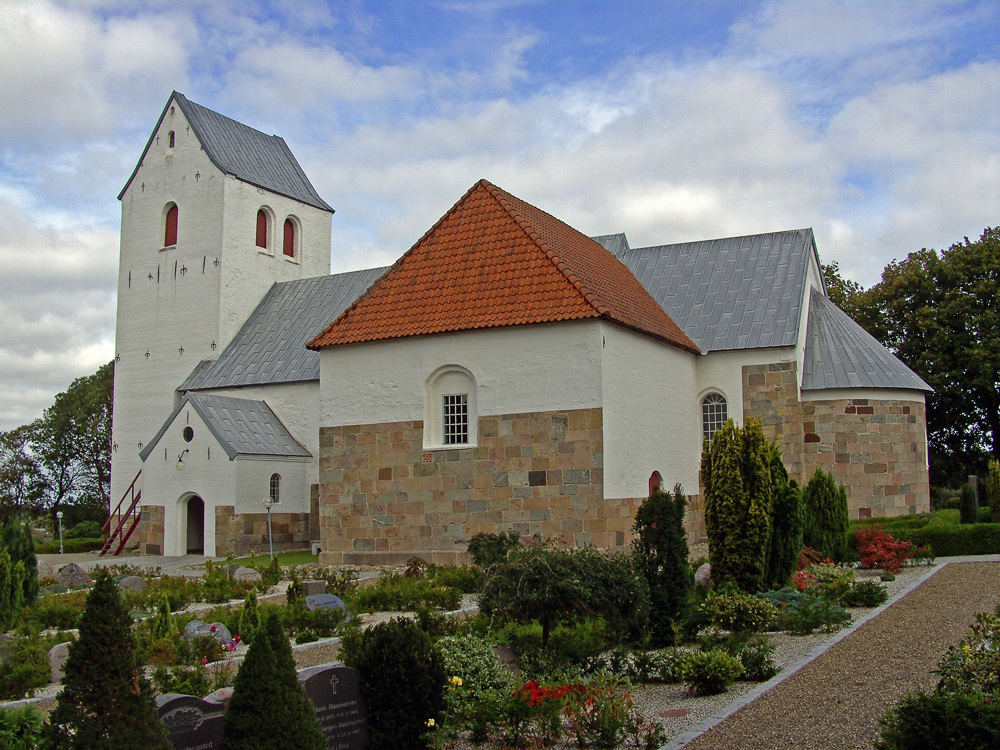
- Højslev Church

- Location in Central Denmark Region Højslev (Denmark)
- Coordinates: 56.58512°N 9.13587°E
- Country: Denmark
- Region: Central Denmark (Midtjylland)
- Municipality: Skive Municipality

Population (2026)
  - Total: 206

Højslev is a small village, with a population of 206 (1 January 2026), in Skive Municipality, Central Denmark Region in Denmark. It is located 4 km north of the much larger Højslev Stationsby.

Højslev Church is located in the village.
