= Glyngøre =

- Town
- Location in Denmark Glyngøre (Central Denmark Region)
- Coordinates: 56°45′40″N 8°52′10″E
- Country: Denmark
- Region: Central Denmark (Midtjylland)
- Municipality: Skive Municipality

Area
  - Urban: 1.3 km^{2} (0.50 sq mi)

Population (2026)
  - Urban: 1,344
  - Urban density: 1,000/km^{2} (2,700/sq mi)
- Time zone: UTC+1 (CET)
  - Summer (DST): UTC+2 (CEST)

Glyngøre is a town, with a population of 1,344 (1 January 2026), on the northwestern coast of the Salling peninsula in Skive Municipality, Central Denmark Region in Denmark.

Glyngøre is situated on the shore of Salling Sund, a strait in the Limfjord, about 1 km north of the Sallingsund Bridge, 12 km south of Nykøbing Mors (4 km as the crow flies), 12 km northwest of Roslev, 6 km west of Durup and 26 km northwest of Skive.

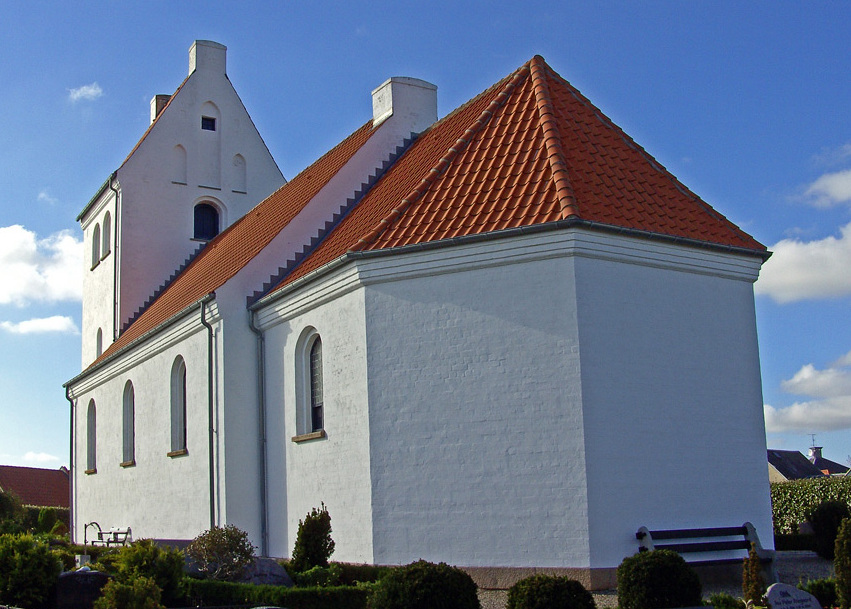
Glyngøre Church

Glyngøre Church consecrated in 1919 is the youngest church in the Salling-region.
