= Salling =

Peninsula in Jutland, Denmark

Coordinates: 56°40′14″N 8°57′48″E

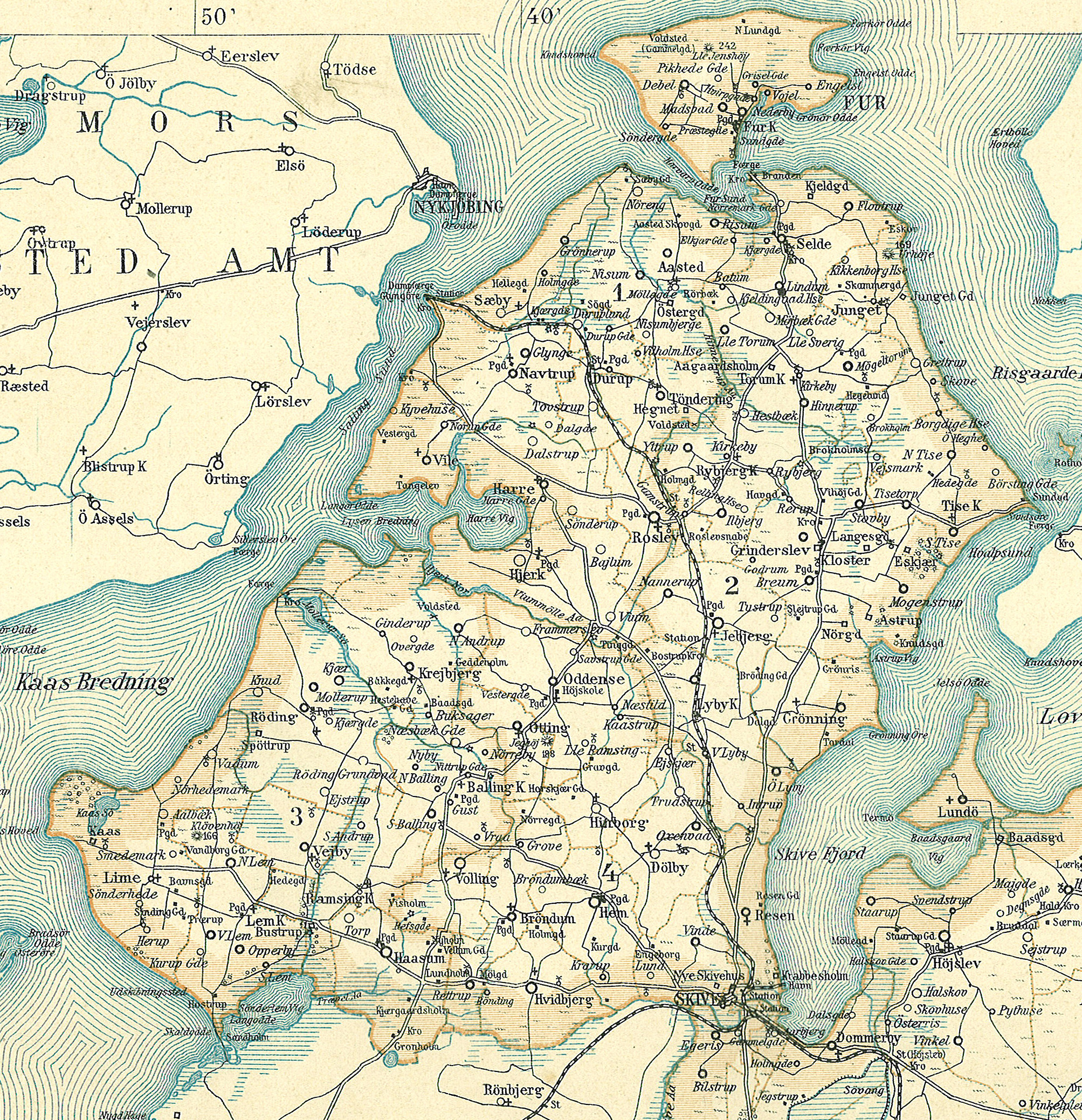
Map of the Salling peninsula (c. 1900)

Salling is a peninsula located in the north-west of the larger Jutland peninsula in Denmark. The largest city in Salling is Skive, and smaller towns and villages include Jebjerg, Roslev and Glyngøre.

The Sallingsund Bridge connects the peninsula to the island of Mors, crossing the narrow strait of Sallingsund, part of the Limfjord. The island of Fur lies to the north of the peninsula and is linked by a 3-4 minute ferry service across the Fursund from Branden.

Since January 2007, Salling has been part of the newly formed Skive municipality.

== Gallery ==
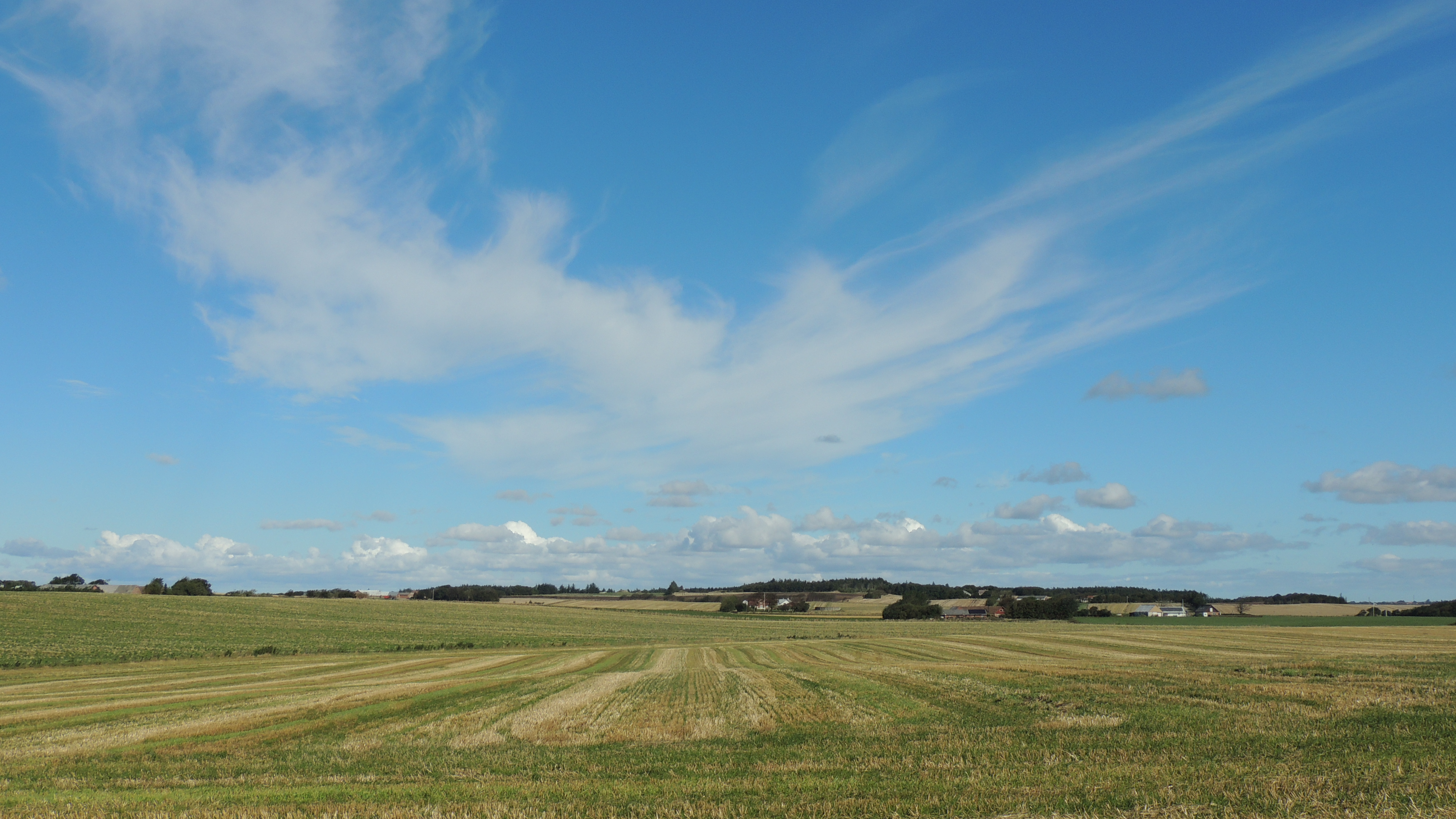
Typical landscape in Salling: flat and featureless agricultural fields.

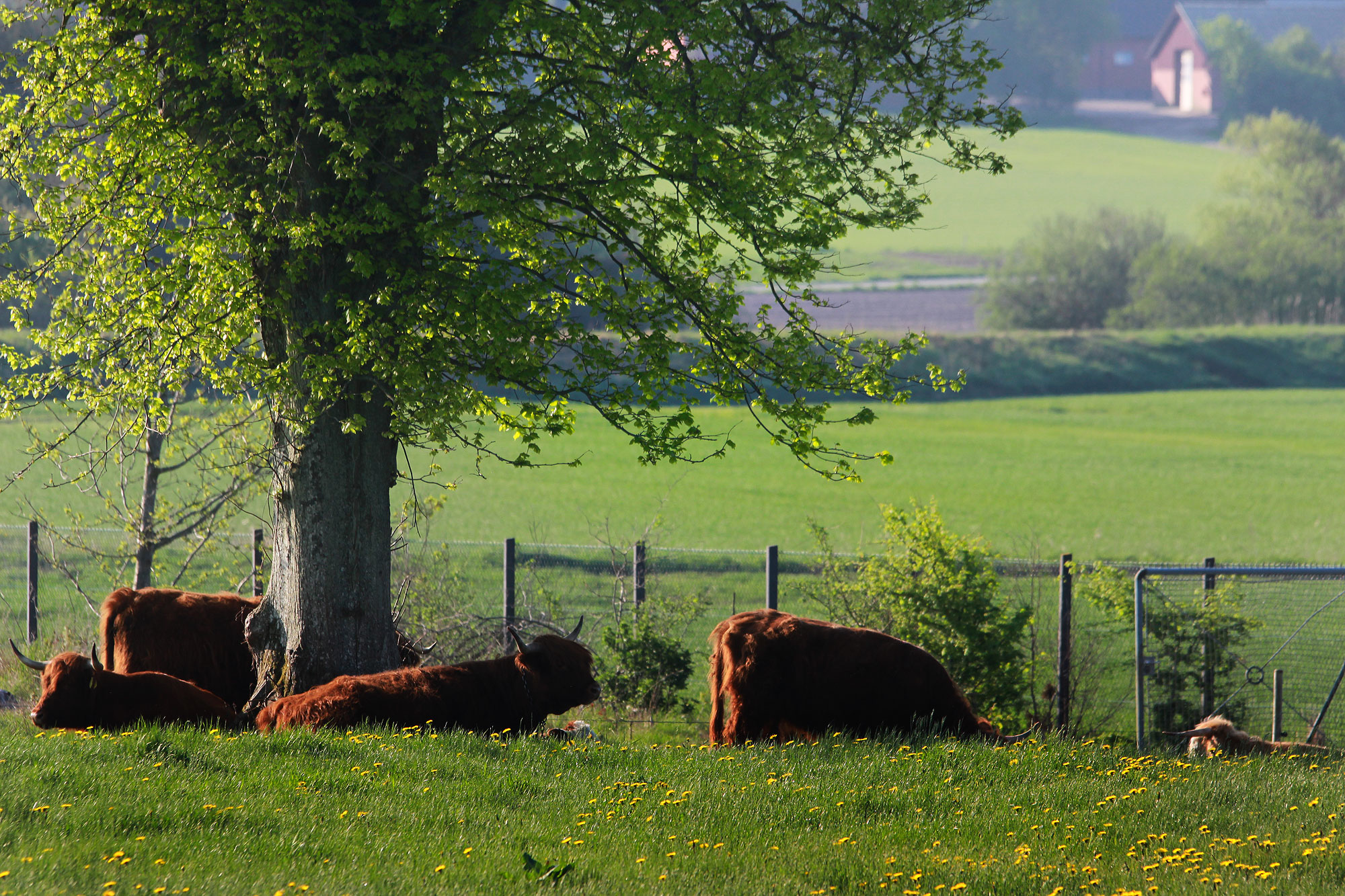
Grazing cattle

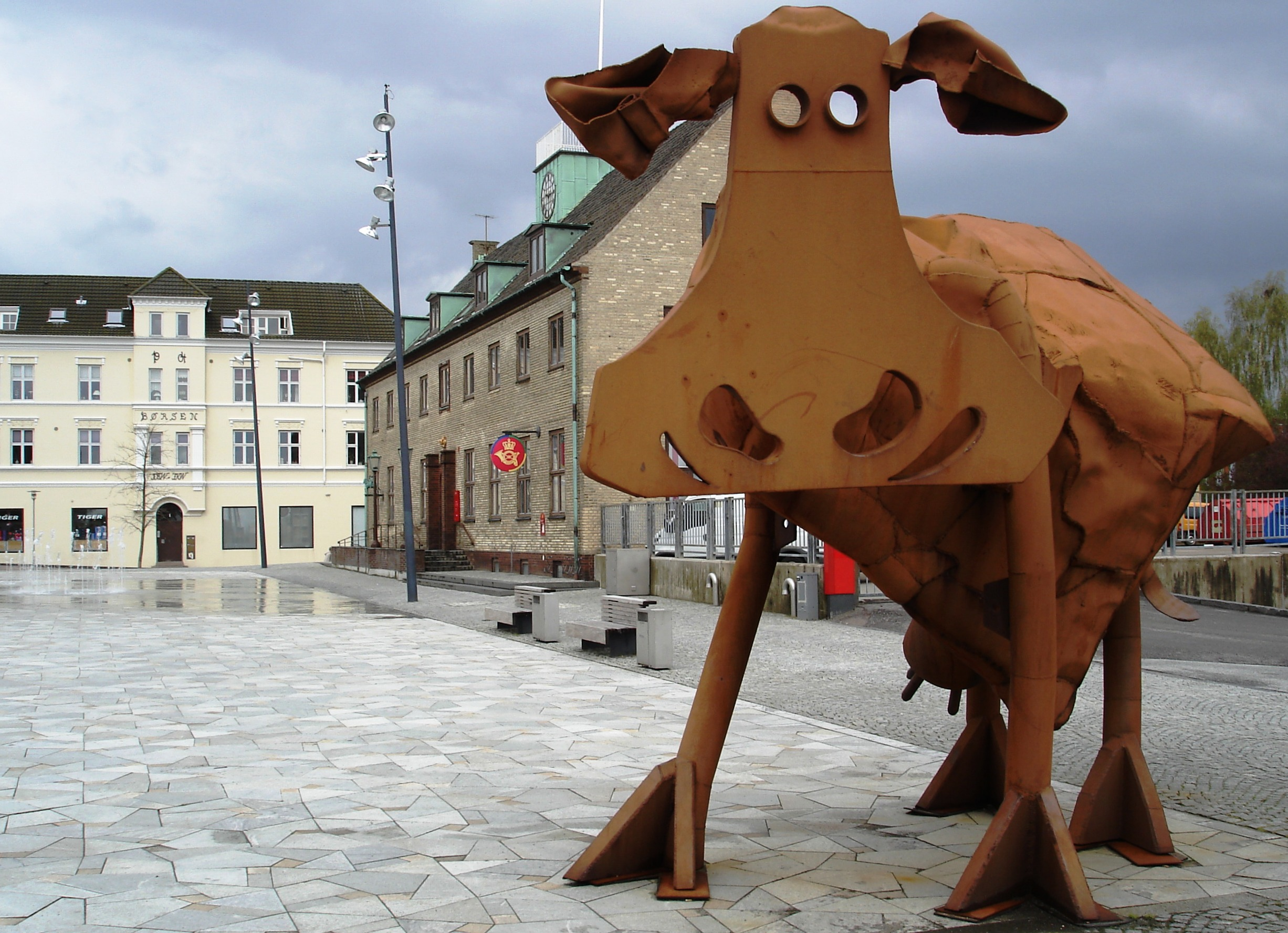
Sculpture in Skive

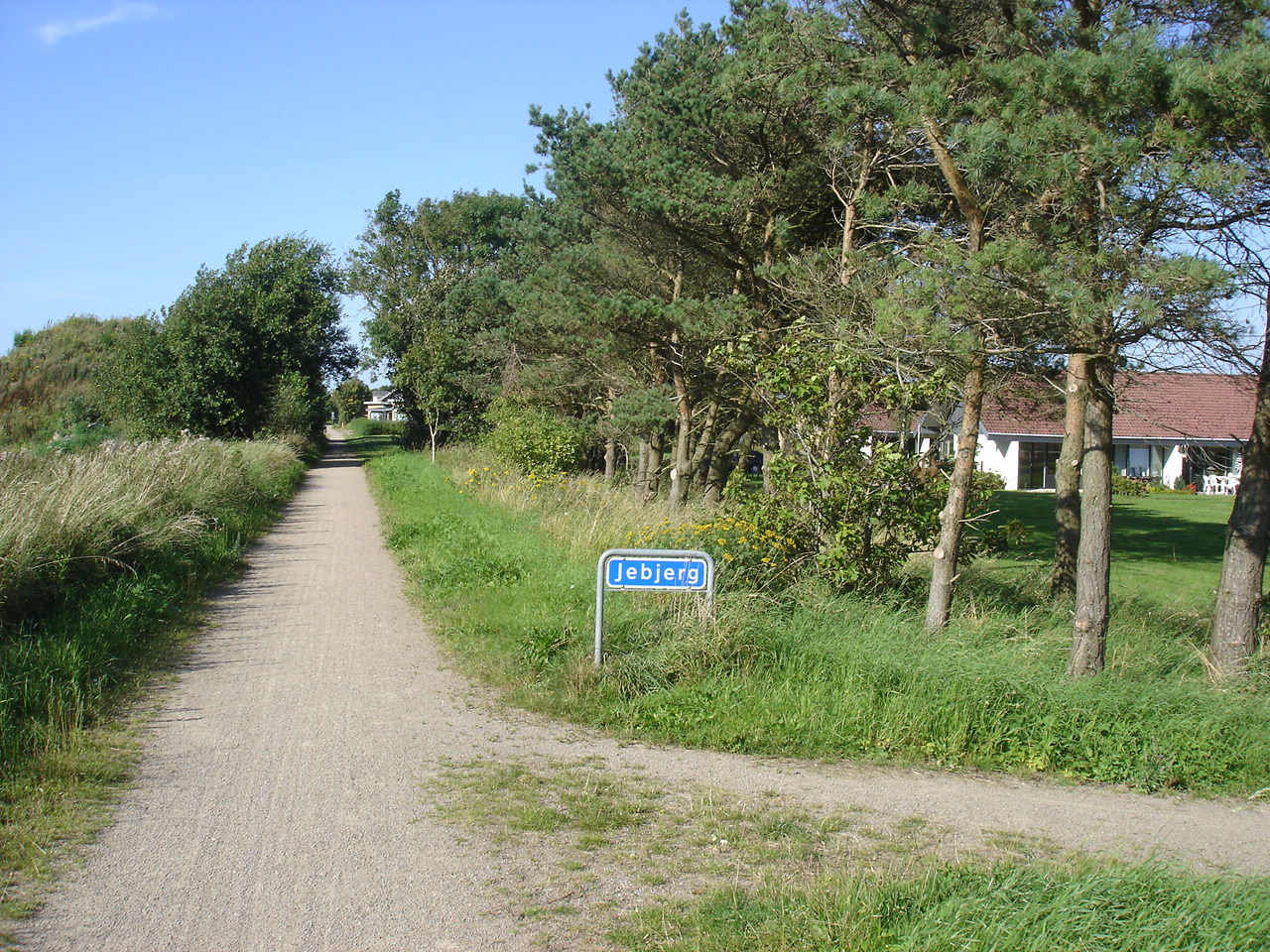
Hiking route

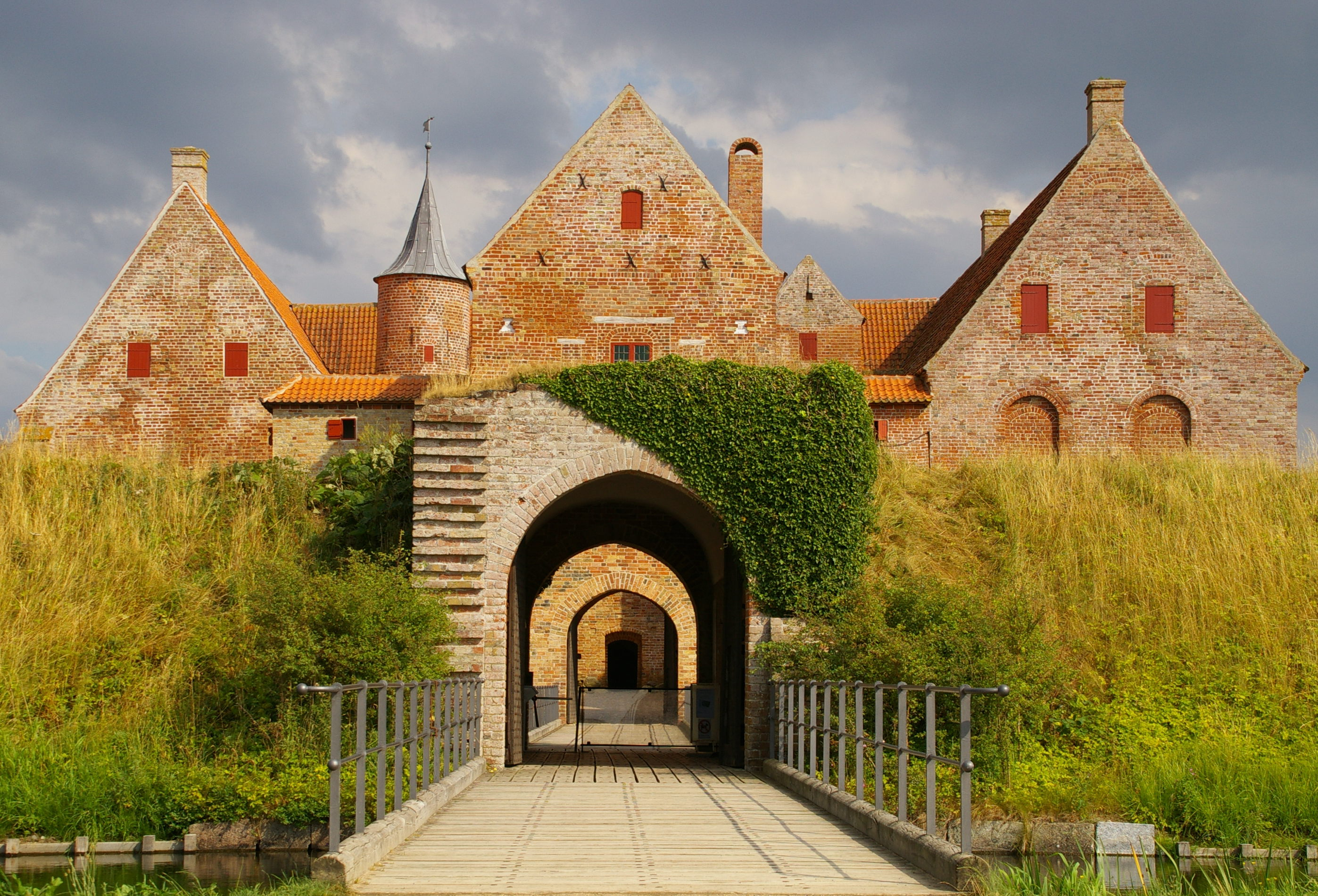
Spøttrup Castle (1520)

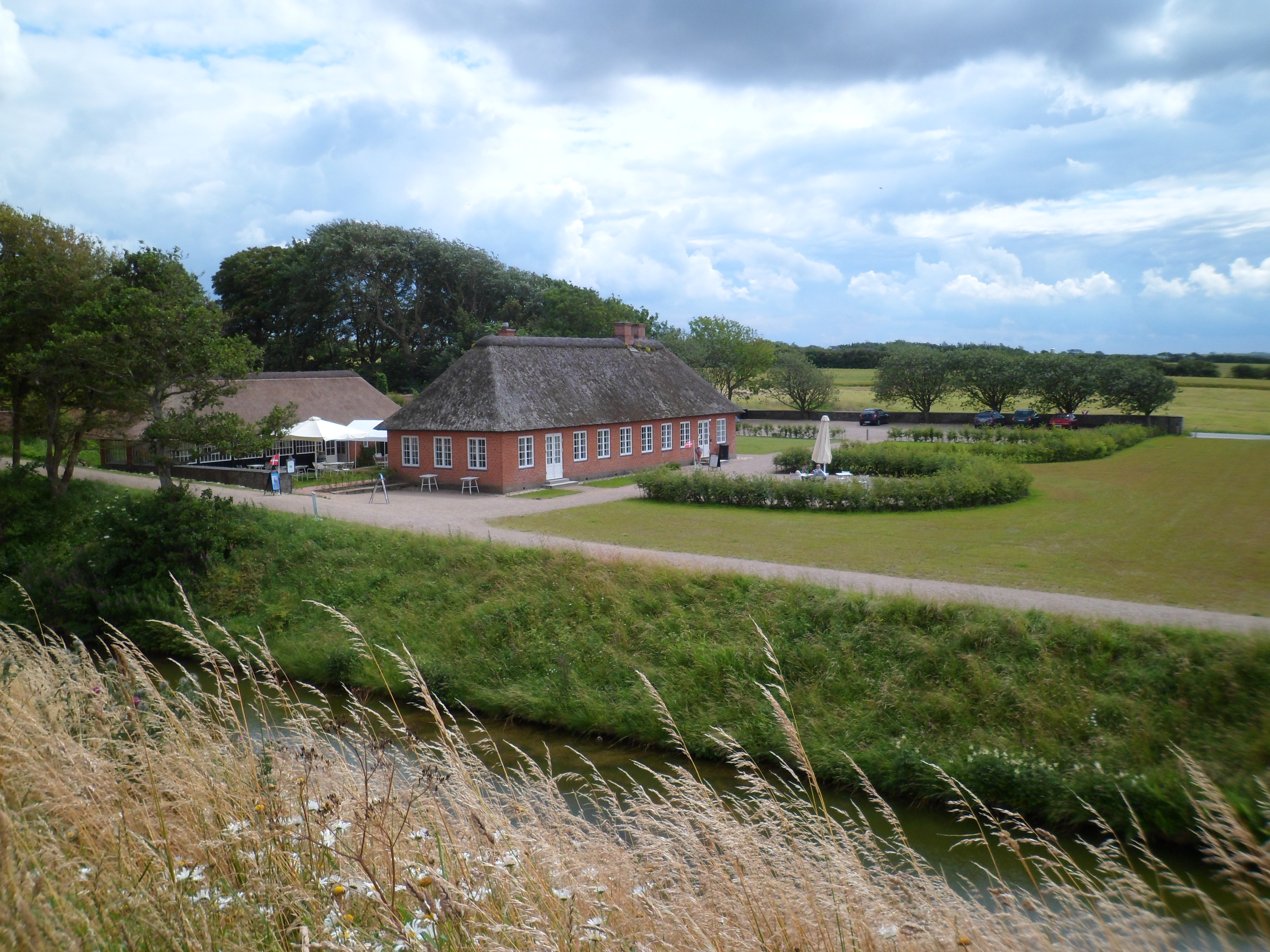
A countryside restaurant

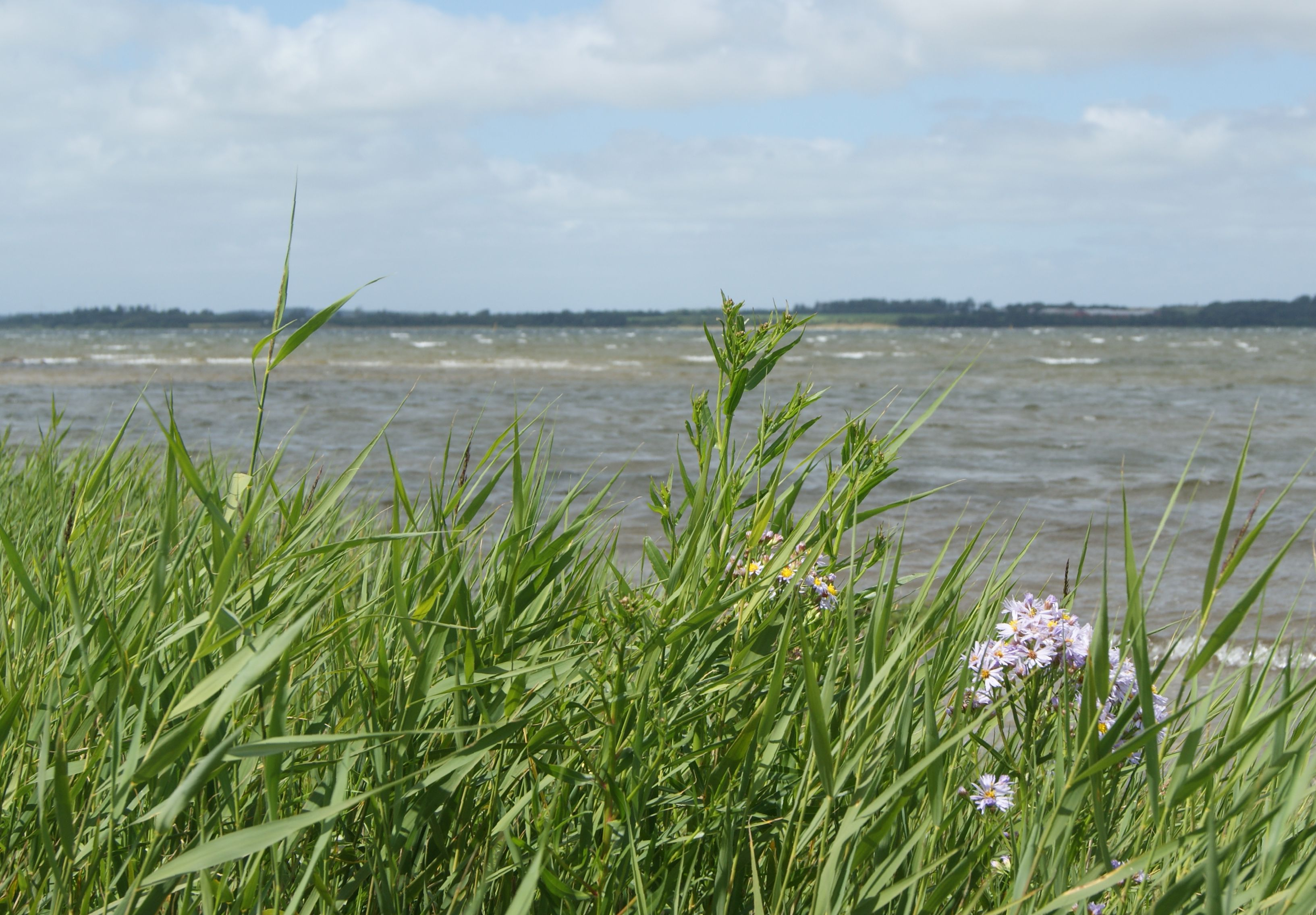
Coastal meadows (Lysen Bredning)

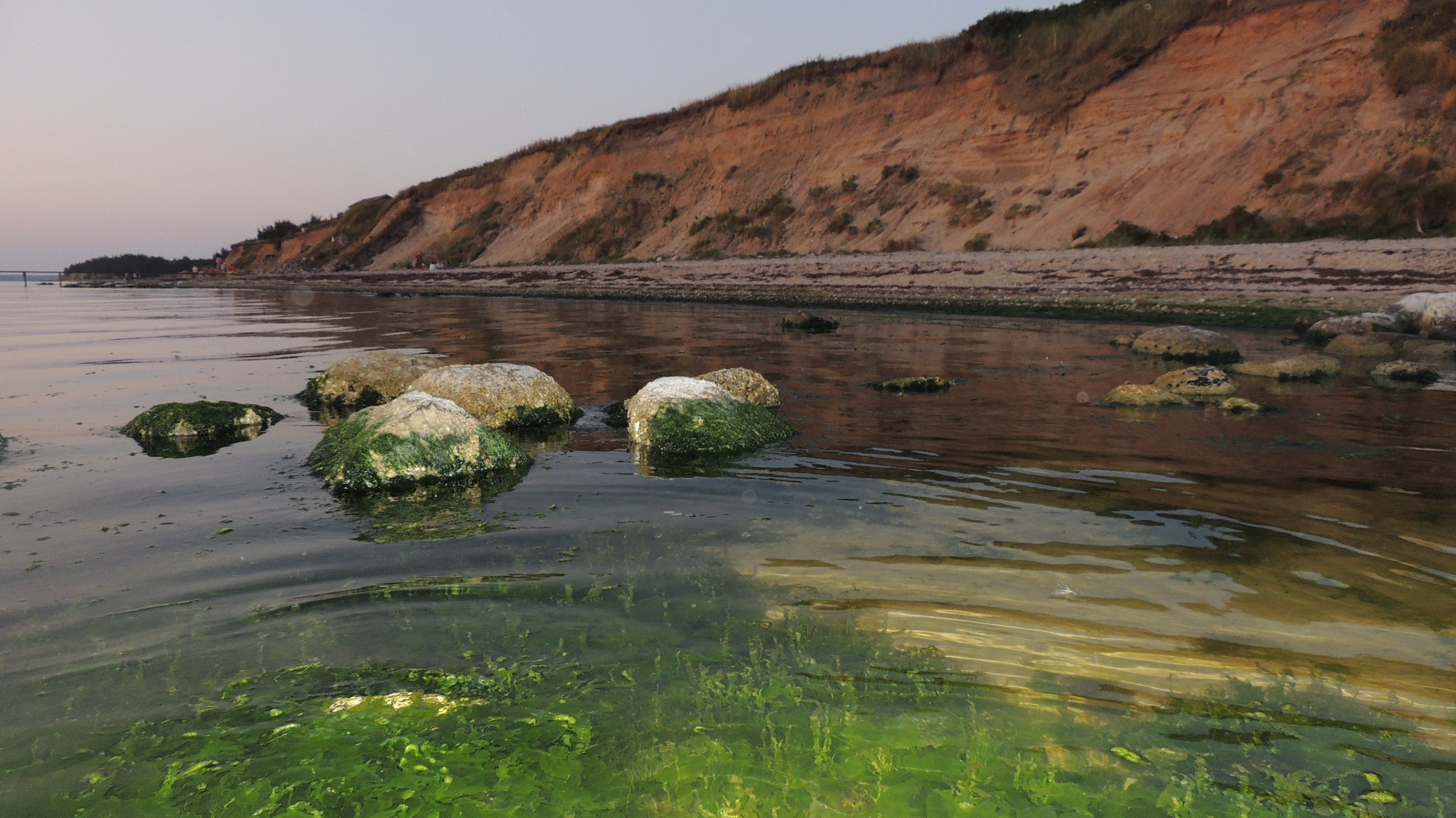
Coastal cliffs (Kås Bredning)
