= Roslev =

- Town
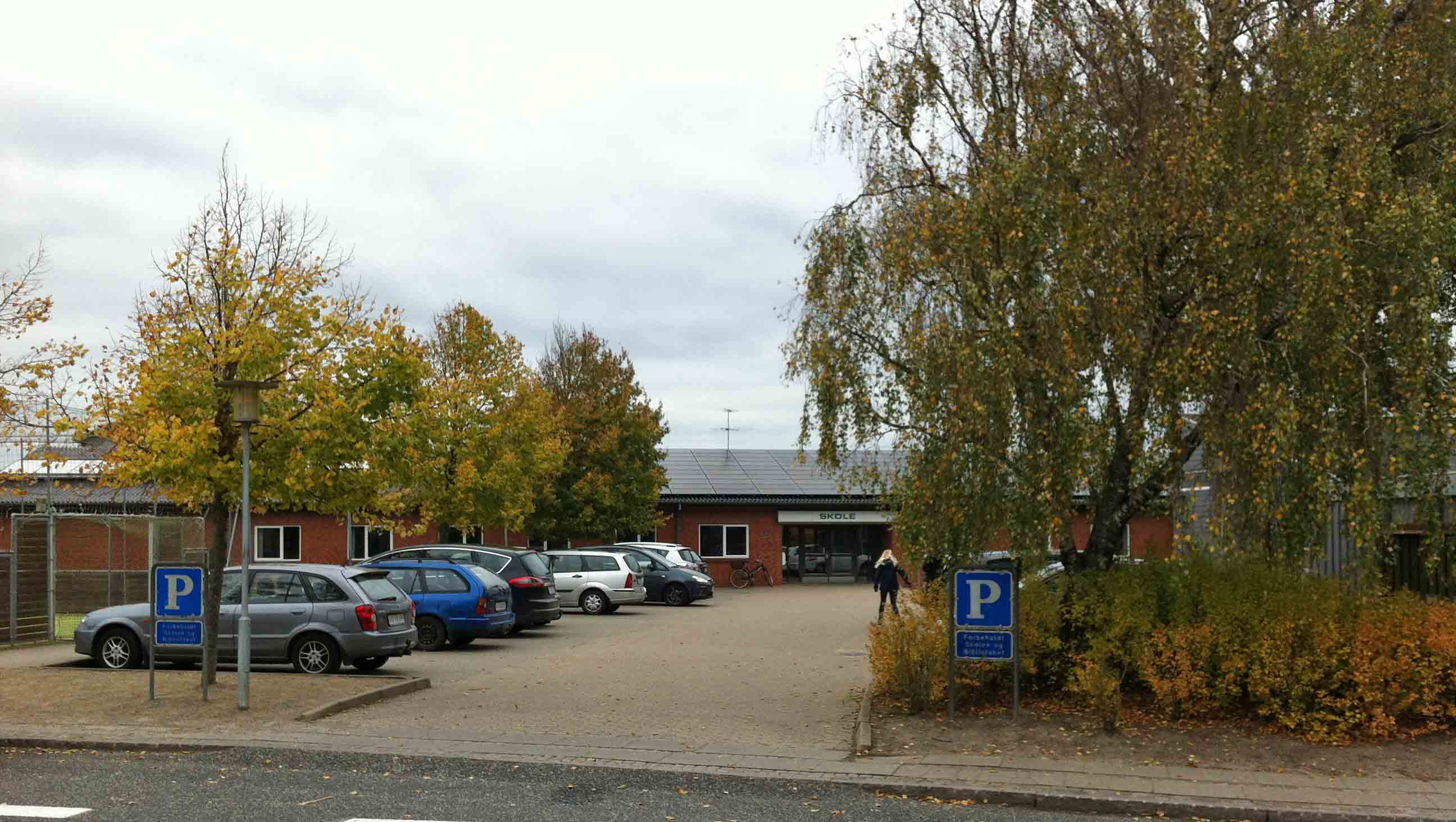
- Roslev School

- Location in Denmark Roslev (Central Denmark Region)
- Coordinates: 56°42′6″N 8°59′4″E
- Country: Denmark
- Region: Central Denmark (Midtjylland)
- Municipality: Skive Municipality

Area
  - Urban: 1.2 km^{2} (0.46 sq mi)

Population (2026)
  - Urban: 1,285
  - Urban density: 1,100/km^{2} (2,800/sq mi)
- Time zone: UTC+1 (CET)
  - Summer (DST): UTC+2 (CEST)
- Postal code: DK-7870 Roslev

Roslev is a town, with a population of 1,285 (1 January 2026), in Skive Municipality, Central Denmark Region in Denmark. It is situated on the Salling peninsula, 12 km southeast of Glyngøre and 19 km north of Skive.

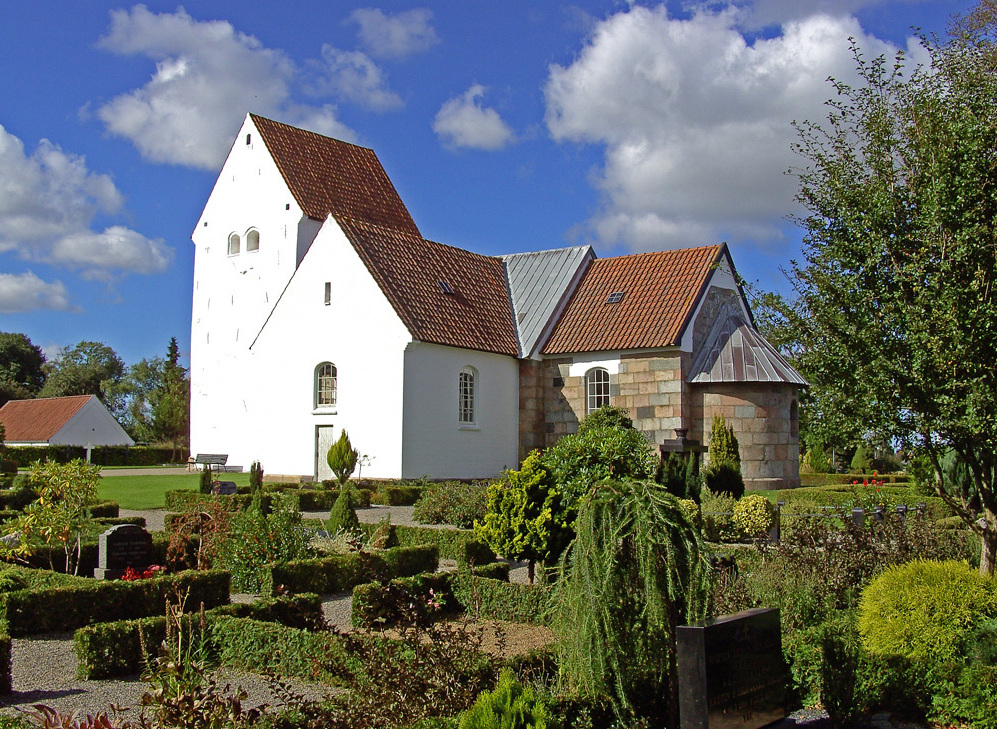
Roslev Church

Roslev Church, a 13th-century Romanesque ashlar church, is located in the town.

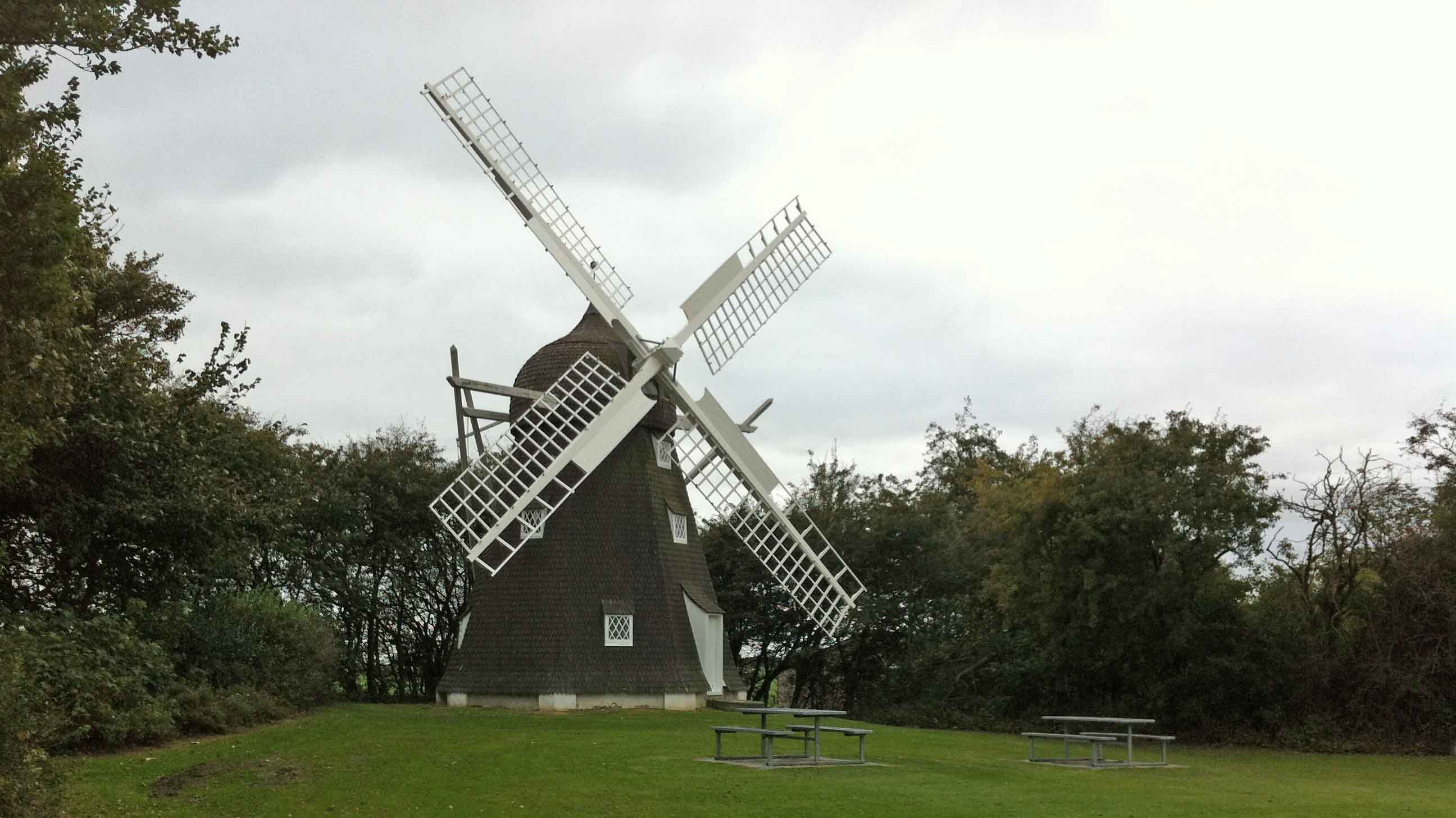
Roslev mill

Roslev mill was built in 1882 as a replacement for an older mill that burned down in 1880. The new mill is a copy of a shingled Dutch mill and was in use until 1951.
