= Skive Municipality =

Skive Municipality Skive Kommune (Danish)
- Municipality
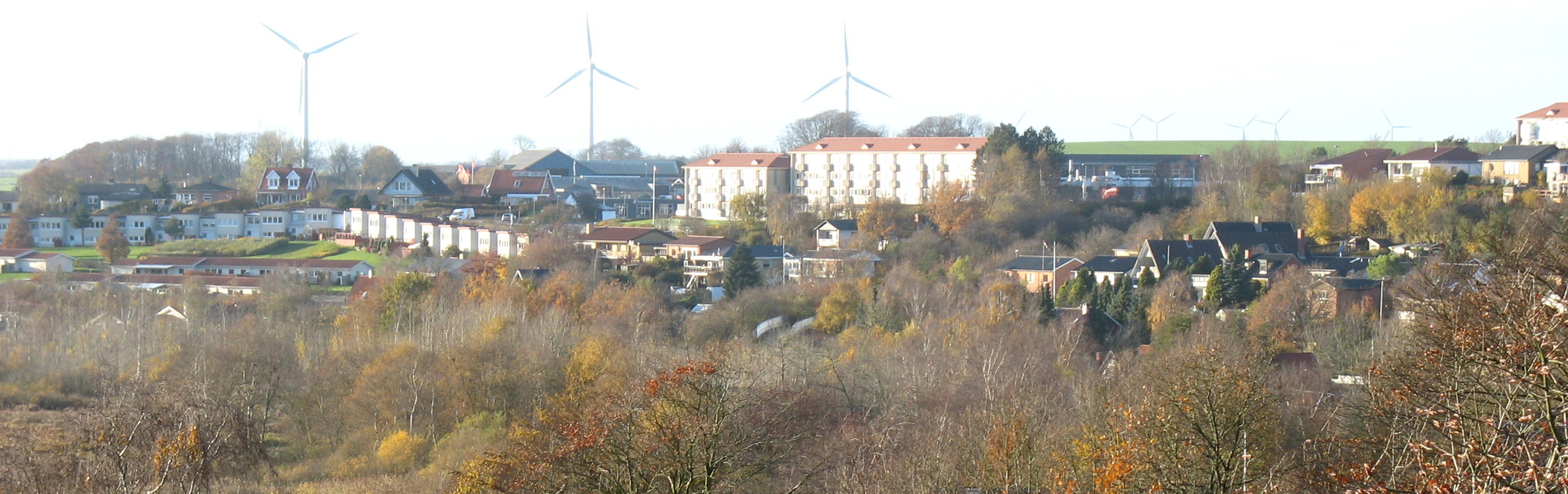

- Coat of arms

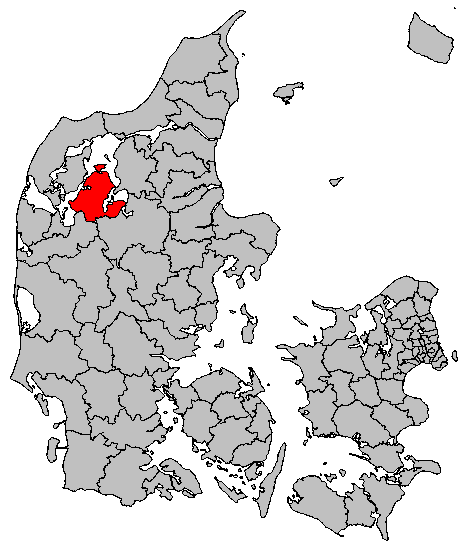
- Location in Denmark
- Coordinates: 56°33′51″N 9°01′50″E
- Country: Denmark
- Region: Central Denmark
- Established: 1 January 2007

Government
  - Mayor: Alfred Brunsgaard (V)

Area
  - Total: 688.09 km^{2} (265.67 sq mi)

Population (1 January 2026)
  - Total: 44,101
  - Density: 64.092/km^{2} (166.00/sq mi)
- Time zone: UTC+1 (CET)
  - Summer (DST): UTC+2 (CEST)
- Postal code: 7800
- Website: skive.dk

Skive Municipality (Danish: Skive Kommune) is a municipality (kommune) in the Central Denmark Region on the Salling Peninsula, a part of the larger Jutland Peninsula in Denmark. It covers an area of 688.09 km^{2} and has a population of 44,101 as of 2026. Its mayor is Alfred Brunsgaard, a member of Venstre.

The main town and the site of its municipal council is the city of Skive.

The Virksund Bridge (Virksundbroen) connects the municipality at the town of Virksund to the town of Sundstrup in Viborg municipality.

As of 1 January 2007, the original Skive municipality ceased to exist as a result of the Kommunalreformen. It was merged with the former Sallingsund, Spøttrup, and Sundsøre municipalities to form the new Skive municipality. The old municipality had an area of 230 km^{2} and a population of 27,919 in 2005. Before the reform, the municipality was part of Viborg County.

Skive itself is a coastal tourist resort at the mouth of the Karup River and the Skive Fjord. In June 2022, Barack Obama visited the municipality.

== Locations ==
Skive	20,176
Højslev Stationsby	2,864
Glyngøre	1,401
Roslev	1,297
Balling	1,211
Jebjerg	1,063

== Politics ==
=== Municipal council ===
Skive's municipal council consists of 27 members, elected every four years.

Below are the municipal councils elected since the Municipal Reform of 2007.

Election	Party											Total seats	Turnout	Elected mayor
Election	A	B	C	D	F	I	M	O	V	Æ	Ø	Total seats	Turnout	Elected mayor
2005	13	1	2		1			1	13			31	76.5%	Flemming Eskildsen (V)
2009	12	2	1		2			2	12			31	74.3%	Flemming Eskildsen (V)
2013	8	1			1			4	12		1	27	75.3%	Peder C. Kirkegaard (V)
2017	9	1			2		2	2	11			27	75.2%	Peder C. Kirkegaard (V)
2021	8		1	1	2		1	1	12			27	71.1%	Peder C. Kirkegaard (V)
2025	5				4	1	2	2	9	4		27	71.8%	Alfred Brunsgaard (V)
Data from Kmdvalg.dk 2005, 2009, 2013, 2017 and 2021. Data from valg.dk 2025

== Attractions ==
- The 14th century Spøttrup Castle underwent extensive repairs in the 1940s and opened as a museum and medicinal herb garden.
- Skive Art Museum (Skive Kunstmuseum) is housed in a building designed by Danish architect Leopold Teschl, who also designed the Skive Historical Museum. The art museum houses a broad collection of modern Danish art with special interest in expressive landscapes and New Realism painting. Also, the collection includes works by local artists, including Christen Dalsgaard, national romantic painter associated with the Golden Age of Danish Painting.
- The Fur Museum is located on the island of Fur, part of the Skive municipality. It features exhibits relating to the island of Fur, particularly fossils.
- The Mønsted Limestone Caves south-west of the town of Skive are run by Denmark's nature-preservation group, Skov- og Naturstyrelse. As well as being a tourist attraction, the caves are used as a place to age cheese, which is then exported to Germany as "cavecheese". In winter, the caves are home to 10,000 bats.
