= 2025 Viborg municipal election =

Municipal election in Denmark

- 18 November 2025

All 31 seats to the Viborg municipal council 16 seats needed for a majority
- Turnout: 55,468 (71.9%) ▲1.8%
	First party	Second party	Third party
	C	V	A
Party	Conservatives	Venstre	Social Democrats
Last election	7 seats, 22.5%	12 seats, 34.3%	8 seats, 23.3%
Seats won	8	6	6
Seat change	▲1	▼6	▼2
Popular vote	12,348	10,309	10,109
Percentage	22.6%	18.9%	18.5%
Swing	▲0.2%	▼15.4%	▼4.8%
	Fourth party	Fifth party	Sixth party
	Æ	F	I
Party	Denmark Democrats	Green Left	Liberal Alliance
Last election	Did not stand	1 seat, 5.2%	0 seats, 0.9%
Seats won	4	2	2
Seat change	▲4	▲1	▲2
Popular vote	6,157	3,885	2,814
Percentage	11.3%	7.1%	5.2%
Swing	New	▲1.9%	▲4.3%
	Seventh party	Eighth party	Ninth party
	O	Å	Ø
Party	Danish People's Party	The Alternative	Red-Green Alliance
Last election	0 seats, 2.7%	1 seat, 1.8%	1 seat, 3.0%
Seats won	1	1	1
Seat change	▲1	0	0
Popular vote	2,345	1,757	1,570
Percentage	4.3%	3.2%	2.9%
Swing	▲1.6%	▲1.4%	▼0.1%
Mayor before election
Ulrik Wilbek
Venstre
Mayor after election
Katrine Fusager Rohde
Venstre

The 2025 Viborg Municipal election was held on November 18, 2025, to elect the 31 members to sit in the regional council for the Viborg Municipal council, in the period of 2026 to 2029. Despite the Conservatives becoming the largest party, Katrine Fusager Rohde from Venstre, would secure the mayoral position.

== Background ==
Following the 2021 election, Ulrik Wilbek from Venstre became mayor for his second term in a row. However, on January 10, 2024, it was announced by Wilbek, that he would not seek a third term. Instead, Katrine Fusager Rohde was the leading canddiate for Venstre this election.

== Electoral system ==
For elections to Danish municipalities, a number varying from 9 to 31 are chosen to be elected to the municipal council. The seats are then allocated using the D'Hondt method and a closed list proportional representation. Viborg Municipality had 31 seats in 2025.

Unlike in Danish General Elections, in elections to municipal councils, electoral alliances are allowed.

== Electoral alliances ==
=== Electoral Alliance 1 ===
Party		Political alignment
B	Social Liberals	Centre to Centre-left
K	Christian Democrats	Centre to Centre-right
Å	The Alternative	Centre-left to Left-wing

=== Electoral Alliance 2 ===
Party		Political alignment
C	Conservatives	Centre-right
I	Liberal Alliance	Centre-right to Right-wing
O	Danish People's Party	Right-wing to Far-right

=== Electoral Alliance 3 ===
Party		Political alignment
F	Green Left	Centre-left to Left-wing
Ø	Red-Green Alliance	Left-wing to Far-Left

=== Electoral Alliance 4 ===
Party		Political alignment
M	Moderates	Centre to Centre-right
V	Venstre	Centre-right

=== Electoral Alliance 5 ===
Party		Political alignment
Y	Velfærdsdemokraterne	Local politics
Æ	Denmark Democrats	Right-wing to Far-right

== Results by polling station ==
Division	A	B	C	F	I	K	M	O	T	U	V	Y	Æ	Ø	Å
Division	%	%	%	%	%	%	%	%	%	%	%	%	%	%	%
Frederiks	37.2	0.9	10.1	3.9	3.9	0.9	0.6	5.2	0.8	0.1	19.7	2.2	11.3	1.4	1.8
Hald Ege	20.7	1.6	19.3	9.4	4.7	0.2	0.8	3.2	2.1	0.0	15.8	0.7	7.4	4.1	10.0
Karup	35.8	0.4	9.6	3.2	3.5	0.5	4.1	8.2	0.9	0.0	13.6	1.9	16.5	1.2	0.7
Løgstrup	18.2	1.0	30.7	5.7	6.1	0.4	0.3	4.9	1.2	0.1	14.7	0.7	10.8	1.9	3.6
Mønsted	9.2	0.5	7.3	5.0	17.2	0.2	0.3	2.6	0.4	0.0	26.5	1.4	26.8	1.6	1.1
Stoholm	9.9	0.7	23.8	5.1	6.5	0.2	0.6	3.6	0.4	0.1	10.6	4.6	31.5	1.4	1.0
Vridsted	9.8	0.5	8.4	5.6	7.0	0.2	0.7	3.4	1.0	0.0	31.1	2.1	28.5	1.1	0.6
Viborg Stadion Center	22.0	1.4	23.4	9.3	4.4	0.2	0.6	4.0	2.2	0.0	16.4	0.8	6.1	4.5	4.7
Bjerringbro	14.6	0.9	42.8	5.9	2.9	0.5	2.0	4.2	0.4	0.0	11.8	0.5	10.6	1.4	1.5
Hammershøj	8.2	1.2	13.8	4.5	11.2	0.2	0.8	5.4	0.5	0.0	12.0	5.3	33.6	1.9	1.4
Møldrup	8.2	0.4	8.9	4.0	5.0	0.4	0.5	3.8	0.4	0.0	44.8	8.8	12.5	1.4	0.9
Houlkær	22.5	1.3	25.4	8.2	4.7	0.2	0.5	3.2	1.4	0.0	17.2	1.1	6.4	3.8	4.0
Røddinghus Kultur- og Fritidscenter	12.5	1.3	21.0	7.4	10.3	0.4	0.9	3.8	0.6	0.0	20.3	3.9	13.2	1.7	2.7
Rødkærsbro	12.9	1.1	15.0	4.8	3.9	0.6	1.5	9.0	0.9	0.1	35.7	0.5	10.6	1.6	1.6
Skals	10.2	0.5	27.9	6.5	4.0	0.3	6.8	3.4	0.9	0.0	23.2	3.0	10.3	1.4	1.5
Tjelecenteret	9.9	0.7	7.9	5.4	4.9	1.1	0.3	8.4	0.4	0.1	24.1	12.9	21.0	1.8	1.3

== Results ==
Party		Votes	%	+/-	Seats	+/-
Viborg Municipality
C	Conservatives	12,348	22.63	+0.15	8	+1
V	Venstre	10,309	18.89	-15.37	6	-6
A	Social Democrats	10,109	18.52	-4.81	6	-2
Æ	Denmark Democrats	6,157	11.28	New	4	New
F	Green Left	3,885	7.12	+1.94	2	+1
I	Liberal Alliance	2,814	5.16	+4.28	2	+2
O	Danish People's Party	2,345	4.30	+1.62	1	+1
Å	The Alternative	1,757	3.22	+1.43	1	0
Ø	Red-Green Alliance	1,570	2.88	-0.13	1	0
Y	Velfærdsdemokraterne	1,180	2.16	New	0	New
T	Hvad kan gå galt med Theis Bach Nielsen	709	1.30	New	0	New
M	Moderates	598	1.10	New	0	New
B	Social Liberals	589	1.08	-0.58	0	0
K	Christian Democrats	188	0.34	-0.47	0	0
U	Tage Søgaard Pedersen	17	0.03	New	0	New
Total		54,575	100	N/A	31	N/A
Invalid votes		163	0.21	+0.02		
Blank votes		730	0.95	+0.28		
Turnout		55,468	71.86	+1.78		
Source: valg.dk

== Opinion polls ==
Polling firm	Fieldwork date	Sample size	V	A	C	F	Ø	O	Å	B	T	I	K	M	U	Y	Æ	Others	Lead
Epinion	4 Sep - 13 Oct 2025	470	18.2	21.4	16.8	9.7	3.6	5.0	3.1	0.6	–	9.1	–	1.6	–	–	9.2	1.5	3.2
2024 european parliament election	9 Jun 2024		18.7	15.6	11.1	13.6	3.2	6.6	1.9	4.7	–	7.0	–	4.6	–	–	13.1	–	3.1
2022 general election	1 Nov 2022		14.8	26.1	15.9	7.5	2.4	1.8	1.9	1.8	–	6.6	0.7	5.6	–	–	11.7	–	10.2
2021 regional election	16 Nov 2021		25.4	28.8	22.1	4.5	3.3	4.7	1.4	2.4	–	1.3	1.5	–	–	–	–	–	3.4
2021 municipal election	16 Nov 2021		34.3 (12)	23.3 (8)	22.5 (7)	5.2 (1)	3.0 (1)	2.7 (0)	1.8 (1)	1.7 (0)	1.1 (0)	0.9 (0)	0.8 (0)	–	–	–	–	–	11.0
