= 2021 Viborg municipal election =

- 16 November 2021

All 31 seats to the Viborg Municipal Council 16 seats needed for a majority
- Turnout: 53,013 (70.1%) ▼2.2pp
	First party	Second party	Third party
	V	A	C
Party	Venstre	Social Democrats	Conservatives
Last election	10 seats, 32.3%	9 seats, 29.0%	7 seats, 18.6%
Seats won	12	8	7
Seat change	▲2	▼1	0
Popular vote	17,928	12,210	11,763
Percentage	34.2%	23.3%	22.5%
Swing	▲1.9%	▼5.7%	▲3.9%
	Fourth party	Fifth party	Sixth party
	F	Ø	D
Party	Green Left	Red–Green Alliance	New Right
Last election	2 seats, 5.2%	1 seat, 2.4%	Did not stand
Seats won	1	1	1
Seat change	▼1	0	▲1
Popular vote	2,709	1,573	1,252
Percentage	5.2%	3.0%	2.4%
Swing	0.0%	▲0.6%	New
	Seventh party	Eighth party
	Å	O
Party	The Alternative	Danish People's Party
Last election	0 seats, 1.9%	2 seats, 6.2%
Seats won	1	0
Seat change	▲1	▼2
Popular vote	939	1,399
Percentage	1.8%	2.7%
Swing	▼0.1%	▼3.5%
Mayor before election
Ulrik Wilbek
Venstre
Mayor after election
Ulrik Wilbek
Venstre

In 2017, former handball coach Ulrik Wilbek became mayor of Viborg Municipality as member of Venstre.

In this election, he would seek a second term. Venstre would gain 2 seats in the election and the blue bloc parties would win 20 seats, 12 of them from Venstre. Therefore Ulrik Wilbek stood in pole position to continue as mayor. It was eventually confirmed.

Despite The Alternative suffering nationwide losses in the 2017 Danish Local Elections, they managed to gain a seat in Viborg Municipality, even though their overall vote share decreased.

== Electoral system ==
For elections to Danish municipalities, a number varying from 9 to 31 are chosen to be elected to the municipal council. The seats are then allocated using the D'Hondt method and a closed list proportional representation. Viborg Municipality had 31 seats in 2021

Unlike in Danish General Elections, in elections to municipal councils, electoral alliances are allowed.

== Electoral alliances ==
=== Electoral Alliance 1 ===
Party		Political alignment
O	Danish People's Party	Right-wing to Far-right
V	Venstre	Centre-right

=== Electoral Alliance 2 ===
Party		Political alignment
D	New Right	Right-wing to Far-right
I	Liberal Alliance	Centre-right to Right-wing

=== Electoral Alliance 3 ===
Party		Political alignment
F	Green Left	Centre-left to Left-wing
Ø	Red–Green Alliance	Left-wing to Far-Left

=== Electoral Alliance 4 ===
Party		Political alignment
B	Social Liberals	Centre to Centre-left
K	Christian Democrats	Centre to Centre-right
Å	The Alternative	Centre-left to Left-wing

== Results by polling station ==
L = Lokalisten - Viborg
T = Hvad kan gå galt

Division	A	B	C	D	F	I	K	L	O	T	V	Æ	Ø	Å
Division	%	%	%	%	%	%	%	%	%	%	%	%	%	%
Frederiks	36.9	1.0	14.3	3.2	2.5	0.5	2.9	0.2	3.3	0.5	31.7	0.3	1.9	0.8
Hald Ege	24.8	2.4	17.0	1.5	7.4	0.7	1.1	0.0	1.8	2.0	30.9	0.3	5.7	4.2
Karup	34.7	0.9	19.9	3.7	2.4	0.3	0.8	1.1	3.6	0.1	30.3	0.1	1.6	0.5
Løgstrup	14.8	1.1	33.4	1.8	3.9	1.1	0.3	0.0	2.6	0.6	35.7	0.5	2.5	1.7
Mønsted	13.9	0.9	33.3	2.3	3.8	0.9	0.7	0.0	2.4	0.9	38.6	0.0	1.8	0.5
Stoholm	22.0	0.9	39.4	1.9	3.9	1.0	0.4	0.0	1.9	0.3	25.7	0.1	2.0	0.5
Vridsted	14.4	0.8	23.4	4.5	13.5	1.2	0.2	0.1	3.1	0.0	37.0	0.1	1.3	0.4
Viborg	25.1	2.1	20.3	1.7	6.0	1.0	0.5	0.1	2.1	2.0	31.9	0.5	4.2	2.6
Bjerringbro Nord	23.6	1.6	32.5	2.4	3.6	0.7	1.7	0.1	2.2	0.4	27.9	0.4	1.8	1.1
Bjerringbro Syd	23.6	1.3	34.0	1.8	3.1	0.6	1.1	0.1	3.0	0.5	28.4	0.1	1.5	0.9
Møldrup	21.4	1.6	12.7	3.4	2.6	0.4	0.6	0.0	3.6	0.4	50.8	0.3	1.5	0.6
Hammershøj	18.9	1.6	19.4	11.1	3.6	1.3	0.6	0.0	4.9	0.3	34.6	0.3	2.4	1.0
Overlund	24.0	2.2	21.1	1.2	5.3	0.7	0.4	0.1	2.1	1.0	35.7	0.6	3.6	2.1
Rødding	18.8	1.3	21.9	2.6	5.1	1.0	0.6	0.1	3.5	0.6	39.0	0.2	2.9	2.3
Rødkærsbro	16.7	0.9	15.6	4.7	3.5	0.6	3.2	0.0	3.4	0.7	46.5	0.4	2.3	1.6
Skals	18.5	0.8	19.8	2.0	10.6	0.8	0.7	0.1	2.9	0.4	40.0	0.4	1.7	1.3
Ørum	25.6	1.7	19.5	3.6	4.1	1.7	1.0	0.2	6.7	0.4	32.2	0.5	1.9	0.9

== Results ==
Party		Votes	%	+/-	Seats	+/-
Viborg Municipality
V	Venstre	17,928	34.25	+1.95	12	+2
A	Social Democrats	12,210	23.33	-5.69	8	-1
C	Conservatives	11,763	22.48	+3.86	7	0
F	Green Left	2,709	5.18	-0.02	1	-1
Ø	Red-Green Alliance	1,573	3.01	+0.66	1	0
O	Danish People's Party	1,399	2.67	-3.56	0	-2
D	New Right	1,252	2.39	New	1	New
Å	The Alternative	939	1.79	-0.09	1	+1
B	Social Liberals	868	1.66	-0.89	0	0
T	Hvad kan gå galt	550	1.05	New	0	New
I	Liberal Alliance	456	0.87	-0.26	0	0
K	Christian Democrats	425	0.81	+0.20	0	0
Æ	Freedom List	211	0.40	New	0	New
L	Lokallisten - Viborg	54	0.10	New	0	New
Total		52,337	100	N/A	31	N/A
Invalid votes		148	0.20	-0.02		
Blank votes		528	0.70	+0.06		
Turnout		53,013	70.08	-3.25		
Source: valg.dk
