= Potato Germans =

German families who settled in Jutland, Denmark

Coordinates: 56.375137°N 9.075851°E

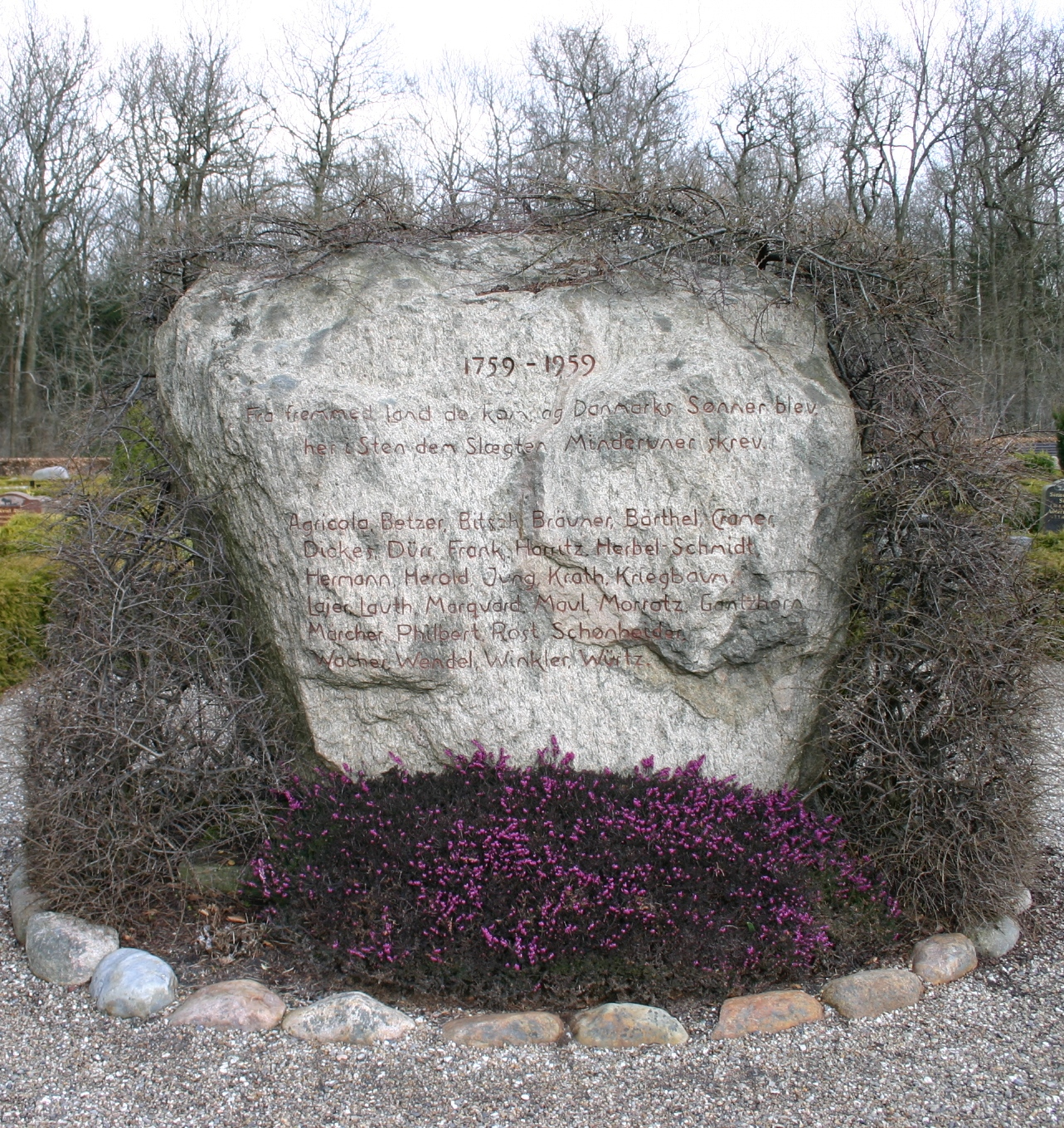
Memorial stone for the German immigrants at Frederiks churchyard southwest of Viborg, Denmark

The Potato Germans (Danish: Kartoffeltyskere) were a group of German families who settled in the heathlands of central Jutland in Denmark during the mid-1700s. The term is sometimes also extended to their descendants.

== History ==
The German immigrants moved to central Jutland when King Frederick V of Denmark-Norway promised 20 years of tax freedom, soil, livestock, money, and freedom from military service, for anyone who would cultivate the Jutlandic heaths. The settlers were mostly from Hesse and the Palatinate in modern-day Germany as well as from Austria. Men, women, and children included, 965 individuals spread across 265 families first arrived between 1759 and 1763.

The majority settled on Alheden in the southernmost part of Fjends and the northernmost part of Lysgård in central Jutland. This comprises the site of the towns of Frederiks, Grønhøj, Havredal, and Karup. Much of this land was difficult to cultivate because of how much heather the soil contained, but after it was burned the area became better suited for the cultivation of potatoes.

The situation was difficult for the families. Many of settlers were craftsmen with little knowledge of farming. Most of the settlers subsequently left, with many moving back to Germany, but 59 of the families stayed on Alheden for more than a year.

== Surnames ==
The Potato German settlers introduced a number of new surnames to Denmark. Though still rare in the country as a whole, many people living near Alheden still carry these surnames.

- Agricola
- Betzer, Bitsch, Bräuner, Bärthel
- Cramer
- Dickes, Dürr
- Frank
- Gantzhorn
- Harritz, Herbel-Schmidt, Hermann, Herold
- Jung
- Keller
- Krath, Kriegbaum
- Lajer, Lauth
- Marcher, Marquard, Maul, Morratz
- Philbert
- Rost
- Schönheider (also spelled Schønheider)
- Wacher, Wendel, Winkler, Woller, Würtz

== See also ==
- History of Denmark § Changes in the agricultural economy
- North Schleswig Germans
- The Promised Land (2023 film)
