= Wilbek =

Wilbek is a Danish surname. Notable people with the surname include:

- Birgitte Wilbek (1928–2025), Danish handball and basketball player
- Susanne Munk Wilbek (born 1967), Danish handball player and coach, wife of Ulrik
- Ulrik Wilbek (born 1958), Danish politician and former professional handball coach, son of Birgitte

== See also ==
- Wilbekin, people with this surname
