= Karup (disambiguation) =

Karup may refer to:

- Karup, a town in Viborg Municipality, Denmark
- Karup Municipality, a former municipality in the former Viborg County, Denmark
- Midtjyllands Airport, formerly known as Karup Airport, in Viborg Municipality, Denmark
