= Karup Midtjylland Airport =

Karup Midtjylland Airport Karup Midtjylland Lufthavn
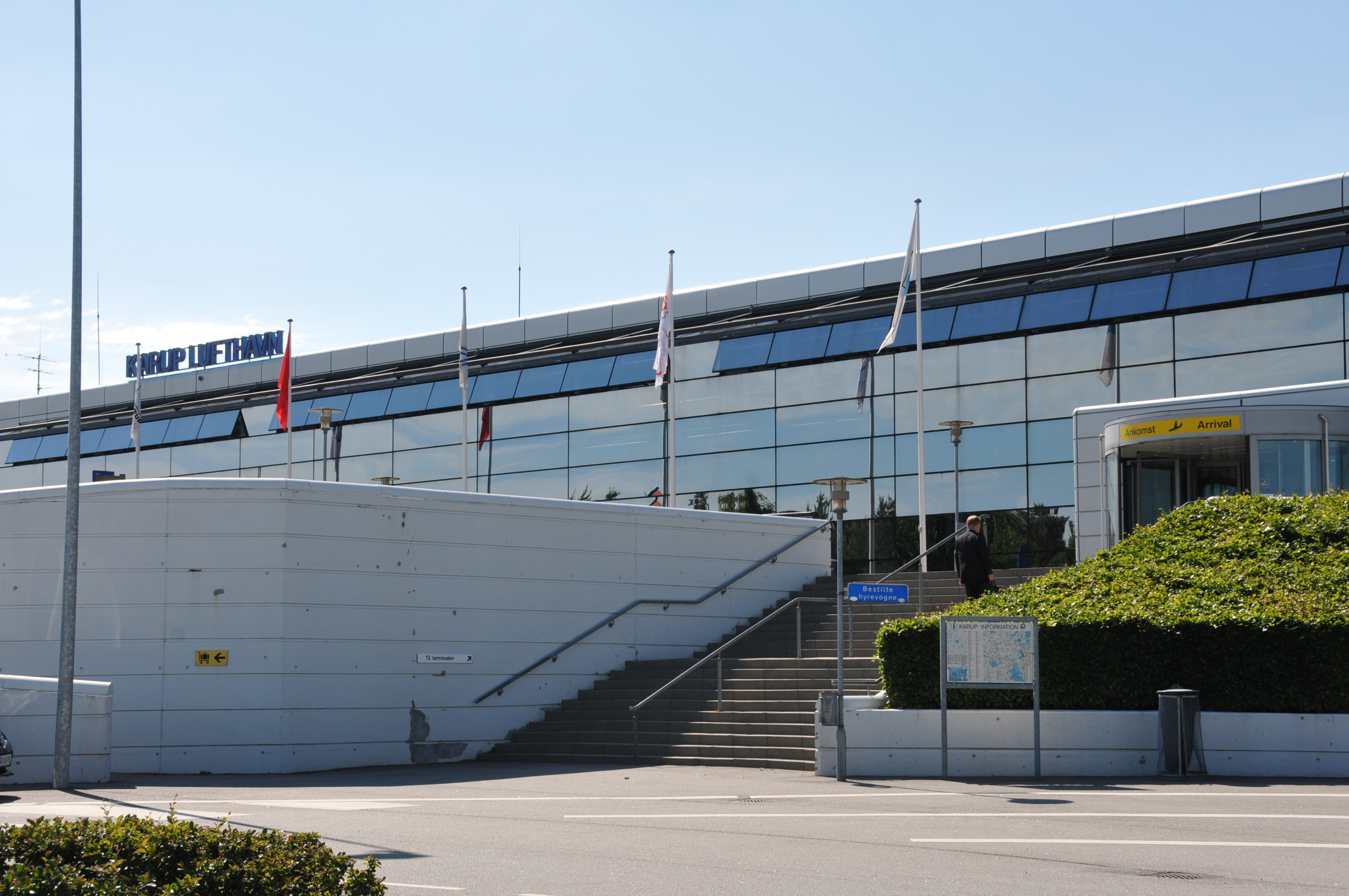
- IATA: KRP; ICAO: EKKA

Summary
- Airport type: Public / military
- Owner: Karup Lufthavn a.m.b.a.
- Serves: Karup, Denmark
- Location: Viborg / Herning
- Elevation AMSL: 171 ft (52 m)
- Coordinates: 56°17′51″N 009°07′29″E
- Website: midtjyllandslufthavn.dk

Map
- Location of airport in Denmark

Runways
Direction	Length		Surface
Direction	ft	m	Surface
09L/27R	10,000	3,048	Asphalt
09R/27L	9,622	2,933	Concrete/asphalt
04/22	3,089	940	Concrete/asphalt
14/32	2,565	782	Concrete/asphalt

Statistics
- Passengers 2016: 154.898
- Passengers 2008: 197.258
- Passengers 2007: 216.461
- Passengers 2006: 208.767
- Passengers 2005: 195.607

Karup Midtjylland Airport (Danish: Karup Midtjylland Lufthavn) (IATA: KRP, ICAO: EKKA), formerly known as Karup Airport, is an airport in Denmark. The airport is situated 3 km west of Karup and carries passengers primarily from nine municipalities in mid- and west Jutland that also own the airport. The civilian airport uses the runways of Air Base Karup, the primary base of the Royal Danish Air Force.

== History ==
The airport is based on a military airfield constructed during the German occupation in 1940. After the war, the Royal Danish Air Force took control of the field which is still its main base.

At the request of some middle- and west-Jutland politicians, the airport was opened on 1 November 1965 when the first direct connection between Karup and Copenhagen was opened. In 1968 the airport's first terminal was built. Until then, it had rented premises at the airbase.

Airport ownership consisted of Viborg and Ringkjøbing county council districts and the municipalities of Herning, Holstebro, Viborg, Skive, Ikast, Karup, Struer, Ringkøbing, Lemvig, and Skjern. It was agreed that Det Danske Luftfartsselskab - later SAS - would start flying on the route in exchange for a subsidy by the owners. In the beginning there was a single daily departure with a 15-passenger de Havilland Heron airplane. The route was a success and there was no need for the subsidy. On the contrary, the airport's ongoing development was paid for with the operating income and no additional public support aside from the owners' initial deposits.

In 1991 the present terminal, Glass House on the Heath, designed by the architecture firm Torsten Riis Andersen, was inaugurated.

Lemvig and Skjern municipality sold their shares to Karup council (now Viborg council) in 2002. As of 1 January 2007 the owners were Herning, Holstebro, Ikast-Brande, Lemvig, Ringkobing-Skjern, Silkeborg, Skive, Struer, and Viborg municipalities.

In 2010 approximately 350.000 passengers used the airport.

Karup lost scheduled flights when Cimber Sterling, the only operator at the airport, declared bankruptcy and cancelled all flights on 3 May 2012. However, coincidentally, Norwegian Air Shuttle announced four daily flights to Copenhagen on an all-year basis, operated by a Boeing 737-800 just after Cimber shut down. This was eventually replaced by an ATR 72 operated by Danish Air Transport, who became the only operator on the route after Norwegian Air Shuttle ended its route on 27 March 2015. In autumn 2023 DAT ceased operation on the route, and the Dutch AIS Airlines took over, operating with a British Aerospace Jetstream 32. However, in the summer of 2025, the airline was forced to shut down the route following economical struggles, as the route was no longer profitable.

In 2025 the nine owning municipalities sold their shares in the airport to the private holding company Heartland A/S. The deal was finalised in October. In February 2026 the airport underwent a name change as part of a strategy to revitalise the airport and give it a more international profile. The airport changed name from Midtjyllands Lufthavn to Karup Midtjylland Airport.

The Air Base Karup is home to several wings of the Royal Danish Air Force, including the helicopter wings, the flying school, the air control wing and several fighter wings.

== Airlines and destinations ==
=== Passenger ===
The following airlines operate regular scheduled and charter flights to and from Karup Midtjylland:

Airlines	Destinations	Refs
Airseven	Seasonal charter: Palma de Mallorca	
Alsie Express	Copenhagen	

== See also ==
- List of the largest airports in the Nordic countries
