= Havredal =

- Town
- Location within Denmark
- Coordinates: 56°19′26.26″N 9°15′59.77″E
- Country: Denmark
- Region: Region Midtjylland
- Municipality: Viborg Municipality
- Founded: 1759

Population (2012)
  - Total: 134
- Time zone: UTC+1 (CET)
  - Summer (DST): UTC+2 (CEST)
- Postal code: 7470 Karup J

Havredal is a small Danish village with a population of 134 (as of 1 January 2012). It is located 15 kilometres (9.3 mi) south of Viborg and 1 kilometre (0.62 mi) south of Frederiks near Alheden in central Jutland.
