= Vridsted =

- Village
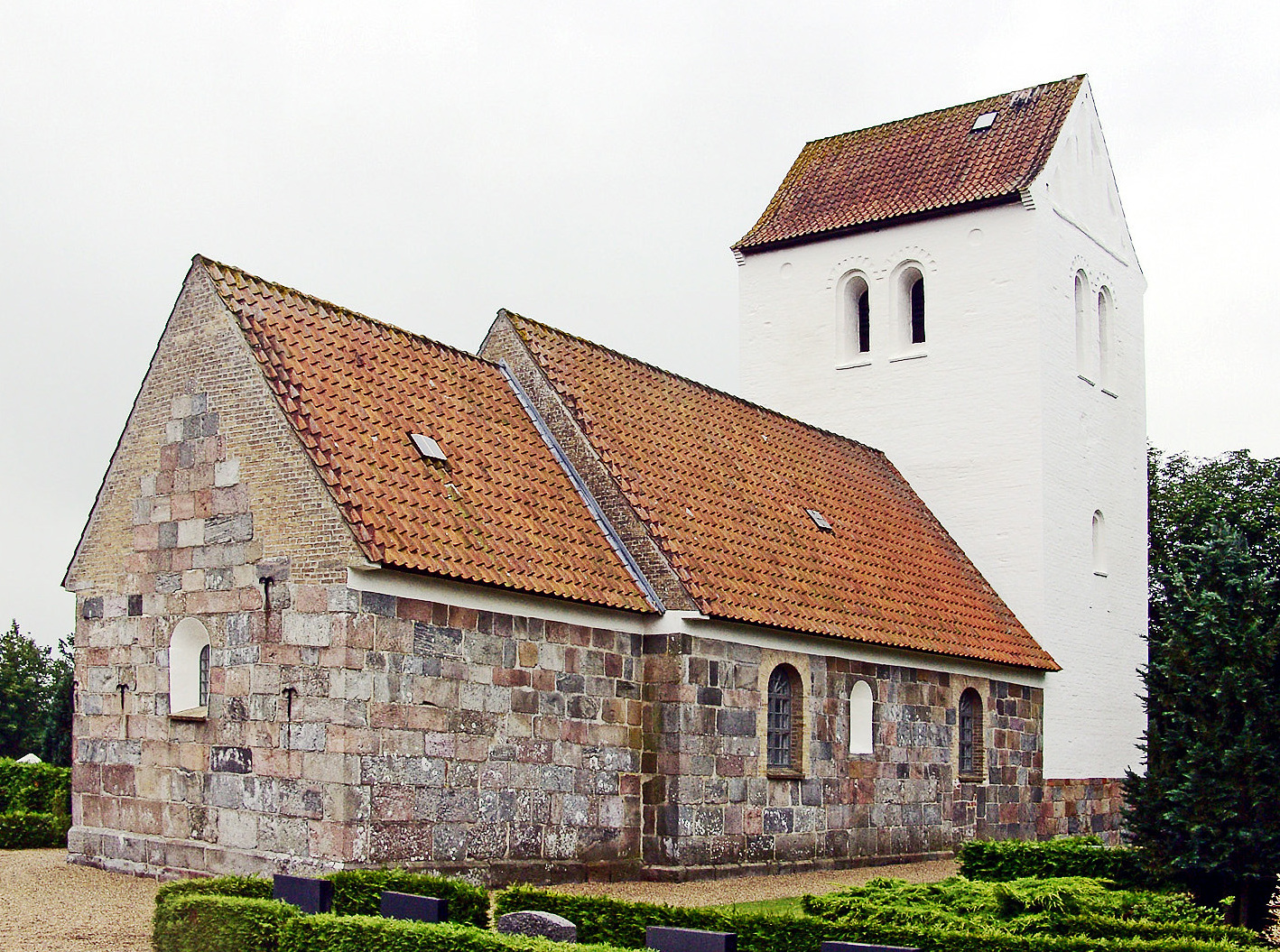
- Vridsted Church

- Location in Denmark Vridsted (Central Denmark Region)
- Coordinates: 56°26′32″N 9°0′23″E
- Country: Denmark
- Region: Midtjylland
- Municipality: Viborg

Area
  - Urban: 0.6 km^{2} (0.23 sq mi)

Population (1. January 2026)
  - Urban: 592
  - Urban density: 990/km^{2} (2,600/sq mi)
- Time zone: UTC+1 (CET)
  - Summer (DST): UTC+1 (CEST)
- Postal code: 7800

Vridsted is a village and parish in Viborg Municipality, Central Denmark Region, Denmark. As of 2026, the village has a population of 592. It lies 13 km south of Skive, 23 km west of Viborg and 25 km northeast of Holstebro. The village possesses a primary school, which had 286 students as of 2017, as well as a Min Købmand store and a sports club, Vridsted IF.

Vridsted is the westernmost town of Viborg Municipality, and borders Holstebro Municipality as well as Karup River (Karup Å).

== History ==
Until 1 January 2007, Vridsted was part of Fjends Municipality. Fjends municipality ceased to exist as the result of Kommunalreformen ("The Municipality Reform" of 2007), and the town became part of the enlarged Viborg Municipality.
