= Lysgård =

- Village
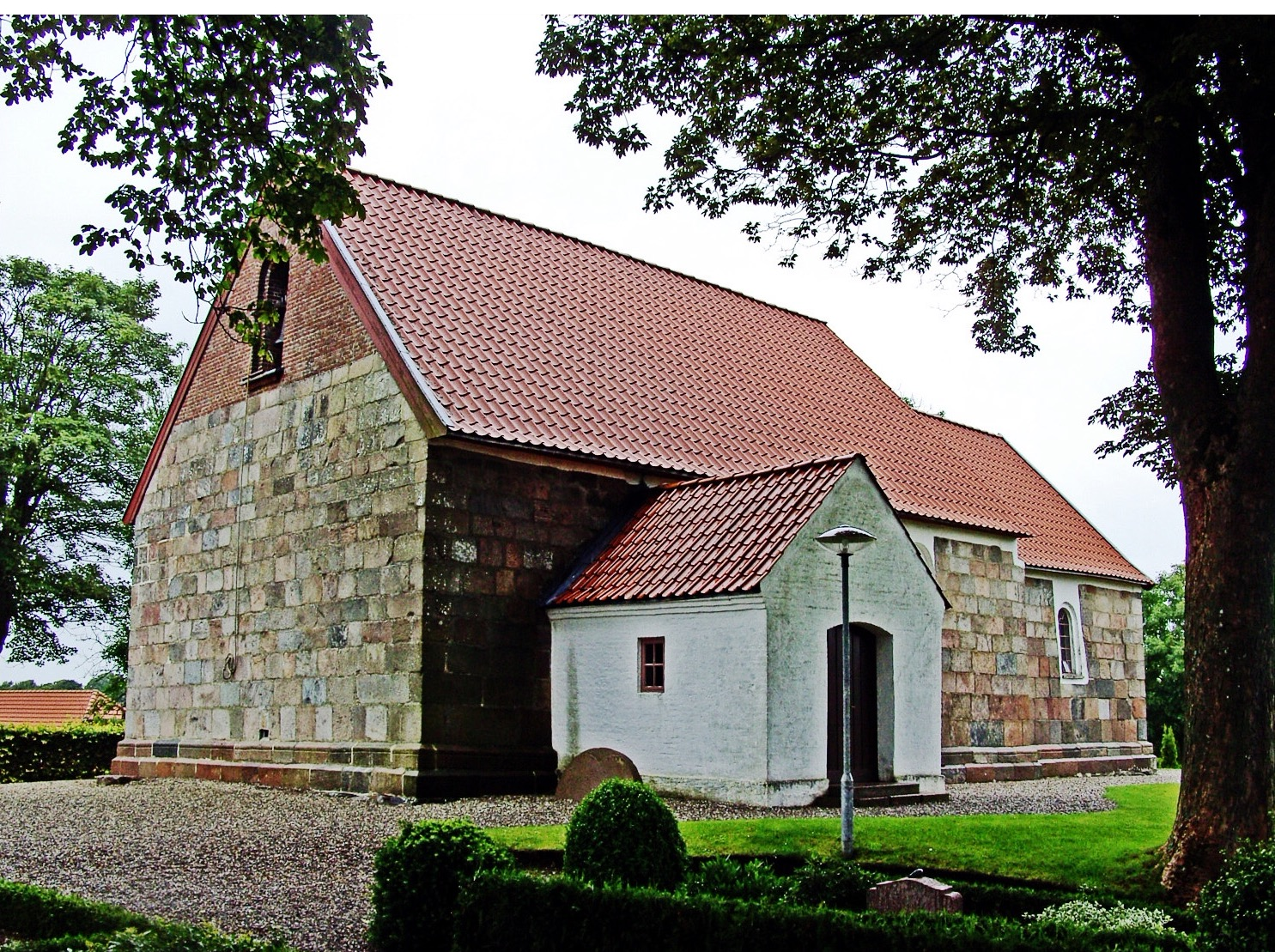
- Lysgård Church

- Location in Central Denmark Region Lysgård (Denmark)
- Coordinates: 56°21′2.51″N 9°20′25.57″E
- Country: Denmark
- Region: Region Midtjylland
- Municipality: Viborg Municipality

Population (2026)
  - Total: 73
- Time zone: UTC+1 (CET)
  - Summer (DST): UTC+2 (CEST)
- Postal code: 8800 Viborg

Lysgård is a small Danish village with a population of 73 (24. June 2026). It is located 15 km south of Viborg near Dollerup Hills in central Jutland.
