= Fjelsø =

- Village
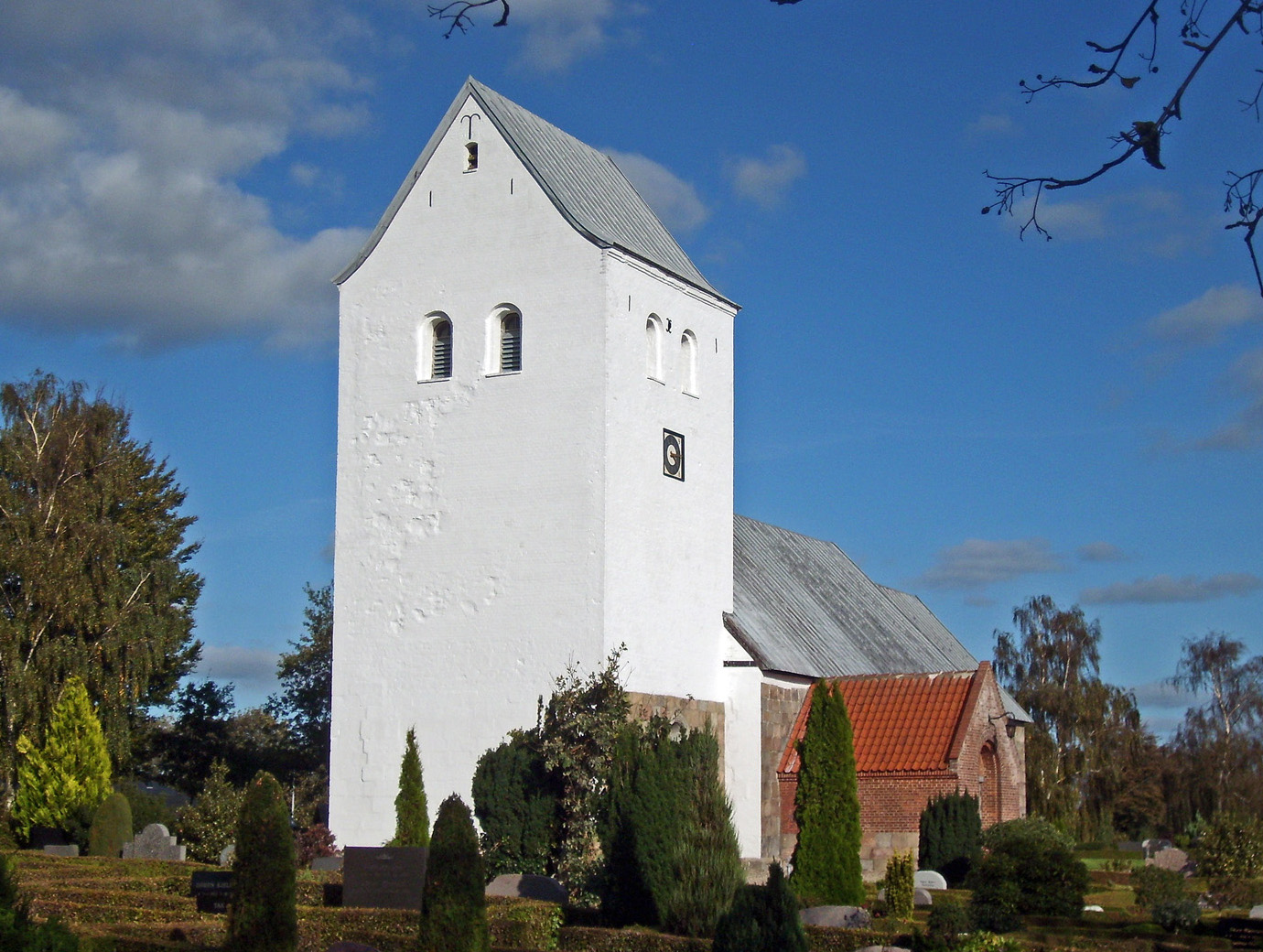

- Location in Denmark
- Coordinates: 56°39′50″N 9°26′05″E
- Country: Denmark
- Region: Region Nordjylland
- Municipality: Vesthimmerland

Population (2026)
  - Total: 206
- Time zone: UTC+1 (CET)
  - Summer (DST): UTC+1 (CEST)
- Postal code: 9620
- Website: www.fjelsoe.info

Fjelsø is a village in Himmerland, Denmark, with a population of 206 (1 January 2026), situated in Fjelsø parish. The village belongs to Vesthimmerland Municipality and is located in the North Denmark Region.

Fjelsø has a lake in the middle of the village. Near the village lies Steensbækgaard, where former mayor of Aalestrup Municipality and former member of the folketing Per Bisgaard was born and raised.

Fjelsø has its own school and Fjelsø church. Before it was in Vesthimmerland Municipality, it was part of Aalestrup Municipality.

== Notable people ==
- Per Bisgaard (born 1955 in Fjelsø) a former teacher, mayor of Aalestrup 1994–2001, and member of the Folketinget
