= Bisgaard =

Bisgaard is a Danish surname. Notable people with the surname include:

- Elle Bisgaard-Church, American political adviser
- Erik Bisgaard (1890–1987), Danish rower
- Morten Bisgaard (born 1974), Danish footballer
- Per Bisgaard (born 1955), Danish politician
- Steen Kai Bisgaard (born 1989), founder of GaardTech Pty Ltd, former Army officer, whose Danish father was a skilled immigrant to Australia in the 1970s.

== See also ==
- Casper Bisgaard Sloth
- Lewis Brisbois Bisgaard & Smith, U.S. law firm
