= Per Bisgaard =

Danish politician

Per Deichmann Bisgaard
- Born: 31 July 1955 (age 70); Fjelsø, Vesthimmerlands Municipality, Denmark
- Known for: Has been Mayor of the Aalestrup Municipality & a member of Folketinget.

Per Deichmann Bisgaard (born 31 July 1955, in Fjelsø), is a former teacher, mayor and member of the Folketinget.

He was born on a farm, Steensbækgaard, in Fjelsø, the son of a farmer, Frits Deichmann Bisgaard and his spouse Anna Bodil Bisgaard, he is married to a school secretary, Jonna Bisgaard.

He graduated as a teacher in 1980 at the Ranum Seminar, and was a teacher at Aalestrup Realskole until he became mayor in 1994. Since 1986, he has also run his own farm as well as a trucking business.

From 1986 to 2006 he was a member of the municipal council in the municipality of Aalestrup, where he was mayor from 1994-2001. From 1998-2006 he was also a member of Viborg County Council, where he served as Deputy Mayor and Chairman of the Venstre county council group. Since 2006 he has been a municipal councilor in the municipality of Vesthimmerland, where he was chairman of the Culture Committee until 2007. He is also a member of the Board of Representatives in the Danish Arts Council and vice-chairman of the Danish Library Association.
