= Monsted =

Monsted or Mønsted may refer to:

- Mønsted, village in Denmark

== People with the surname ==
- Peder Mørk Mønsted (1859-1941), Danish painter
- Otto Mønsted (1838-1916), Danish margarine manufacturer

== See also ==
- Monsted-Vincent, an aircraft
