= Else Birkmose =

Danish hand- and basketball player (1931–1998)

Personal information
- Nationality: Danish
- Born: 3 January 1931 Copenhagen, Denmark
- Died: 28 July 1998 (aged 67) Ålsgårde, Denmark

Sport
- Sport: Handball

Senior clubs
- Years: Team
- 1947–?: Handelsstandens Gymnastikforening
National team
Years	Team	Apps	(Gls)
1948–1962	Denmark	63	(109)
Medal record
Representing Denmark
World Championships
Silver medal – second place	1962 Romania	Team

Else Gunnarsson née Birkmose-Pedersen (3 January 1931 – 28 September 1998) was a Danish handball and basketball player. She represented Denmark on both national teams. She was part of the Danish team that won silver medals at the 1962 World Women's Handball Championship in Romania.

== Handball career ==
Birkmose was introduced to the game in 1944-45 when handball players from Copenhagen-based club Handelsstandens Gymnastikforening were practicing at the school. She debuted for the handball team of HG in 1947. With the club she won 7 Danish league titles between 1951 and 1965. She won the 1964–65 European Cup with HG. This was the first time a Danish club had won the tournament. The following season, they reached the final, but lost to East German club SC Leipzig. During the 1960s she was considered one the best female handball players in the world. She was known as technical player with great tactical understanding.

Birkmose debuted for the Danish national team in 1948. She competed at the first ever Women's World Championship in Yugoslavia 1957, where Denmark finished 5th. In 1956 she would be the first the reach 25 caps for the Danish Women's National Team.

She retired from the handball national team after the 1962 World Women's Handball Championship in Romania, where Denmark won silver medals.

In 1963 she became the head coach of the Denmark women's national handball team together with Birgitte Wilbek. They were the first, and until this date, the only women on the position. Under their leadership the team developed from a team mostly there to provide exercise to a competitively viable team.

== Basketball career ==
Birkmose represented Denmark at the 1956 European Championships where Denmark finished 13th.

== Post Playing career ==
Birkmose was a board member of Københavns Håndbold Forbund from 1957 to 1958 and was generally involved in the organisation between 1954 and 1962.

She was educated as a secretary. Until 1965 she was employed by the insurance company Nye Danske. Afterwards she was employed by the Danish newspaper Det fri Aktuelt.
