= Møldrup Municipality =

Former municipality of Denmark

Coordinates: 56°36′57″N 9°29′58″E

Until 1 January 2007 Møldrup municipality was a municipality (Danish, kommune) in the former Viborg County on the Jutland peninsula in northern Denmark. The municipality covered an area of 212 km^{2} (82 sq mi), and had a total population of 7,670 (2005). Its last mayor was Gunnar Korsbæk, a member of the Venstre (Liberal Party) political party. The main town and the site of its municipal council was the town of Møldrup.

Møldrup municipality ceased to exist as the result of Kommunalreformen ("The Municipality Reform" of 2007). It was merged with Bjerringbro, Fjends, Karup, Tjele, and Viborg municipalities to form an enlarged Viborg municipality. This created a municipality with an area of 1,390 km² and a total population of 88,945 (2005), belonging to the new Region Midtjylland ("Mid-Jutland Region").
