= Bjerringbro Municipality =

Former municipality in Denmark

Coordinates: 56°22′39″N 9°39′43″E

Until 1 January 2007, Bjerringbro municipality was a municipality (Danish, kommune) in Viborg County on the Jutland peninsula in northern Denmark. The municipality covered an area of 207 km^{2}, and had a total population of 13,922 (2005). Its latest mayor was Poul Vesterbæk, a member of the Venstre (Liberal Party) political party. The main town and the site of its municipal council was the town of Bjerringbro.

Bjerringbro municipality ceased to exist as the result of Kommunalreformen ("The Municipality Reform" of 2007). It was merged with Fjends, Karup, Møldrup, Tjele, and Viborg municipalities to form an enlarged Viborg municipality. This created a municipality with an area of 1,390 km^{2} and a total population of 88,945 (2005). The new municipality belongs to the Region Midtjylland ("Mid-Jutland Region").
