= Tjele Municipality =

Former municipality in Viborg, Denmark

Coordinates: 56°30′51″N 9°36′42″E

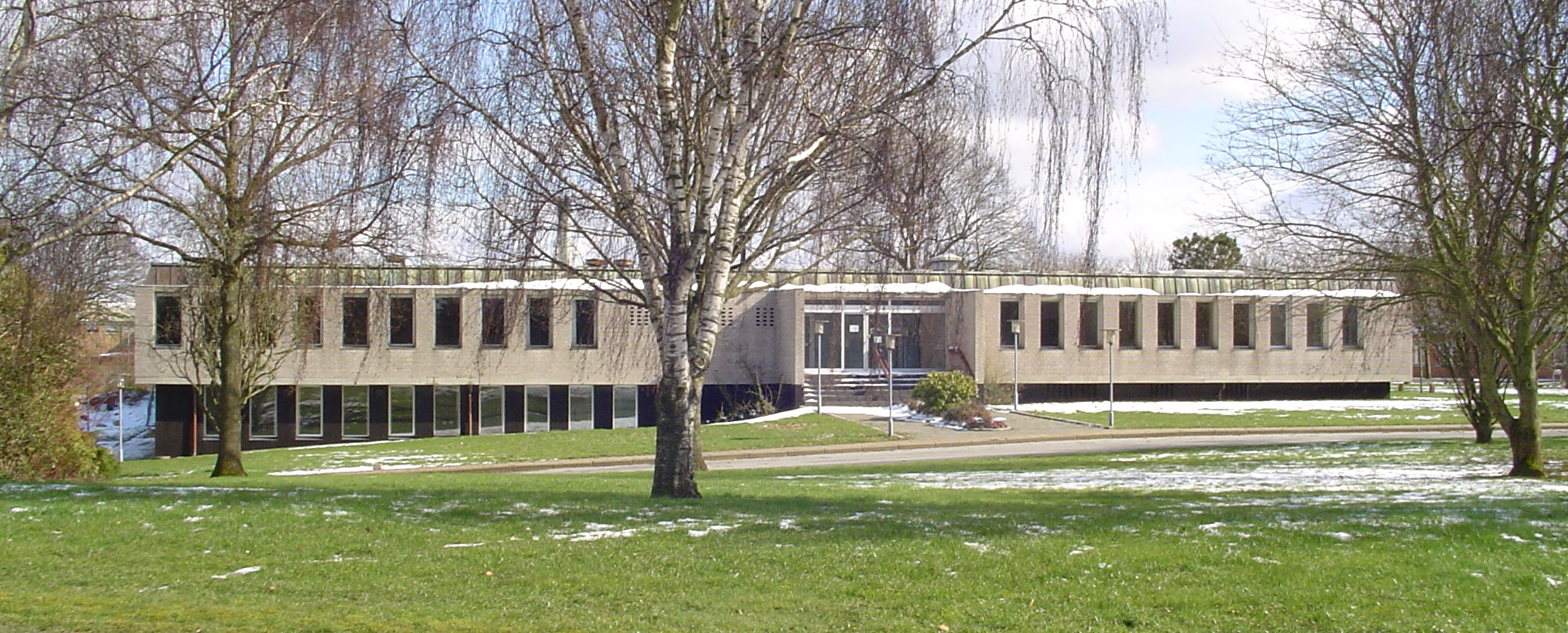
Former townhall of the municipality in Ørum.

Until 1 January 2007 Tjele municipality was a municipality (Danish, kommune) in the former Viborg County on the Jutland peninsula in northern Denmark. The municipality covered an area of 273 km^{2}, and had a total population of 8,641 (2005). Its last mayor was Anna Margrethe Kaalund. The main town and the site of its municipal council was the town of Ørum.

Tjele municipality ceased to exist as the result of Kommunalreformen ("The Municipality Reform" of 2007). It was merged with Bjerringbro, Fjends, Karup, Møldrup, and Viborg municipalities to form an enlarged Viborg municipality. This created a municipality with an area of 1,390 km^{2} and a total population of 88,945 (2005). The municipality belongs to Region Midtjylland ("Mid-Jutland Region").
