= Mønsted =

Village in Viborg Municipality, Denmark

- Village
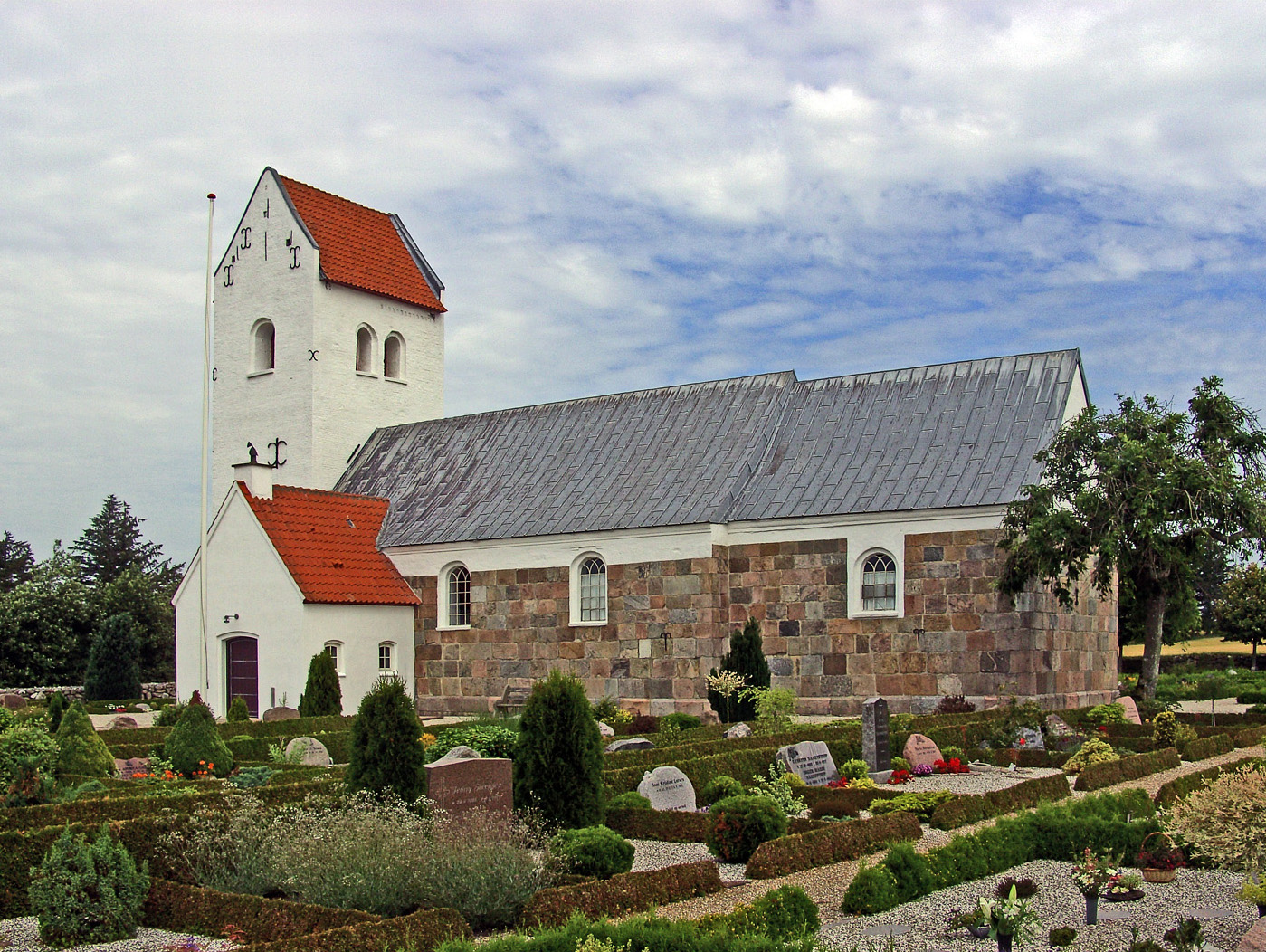
- Mønsted Church

- Location within Denmark
- Coordinates: 56°26′46″N 9°11′14″E
- Country: Denmark
- Region: Central Denmark (Midtjylland)
- Municipality: Viborg

Population (2026)
  - Total: 731
- Time zone: UTC+1 (Central European Time)
  - Summer (DST): UTC+2 (Central European Summer Time)

Mønsted is a village, with a population of 731 (1 January 2026), in Viborg Municipality, Central Denmark Region in Denmark. It is located 15 km west of Viborg and 6 km south of Stoholm.

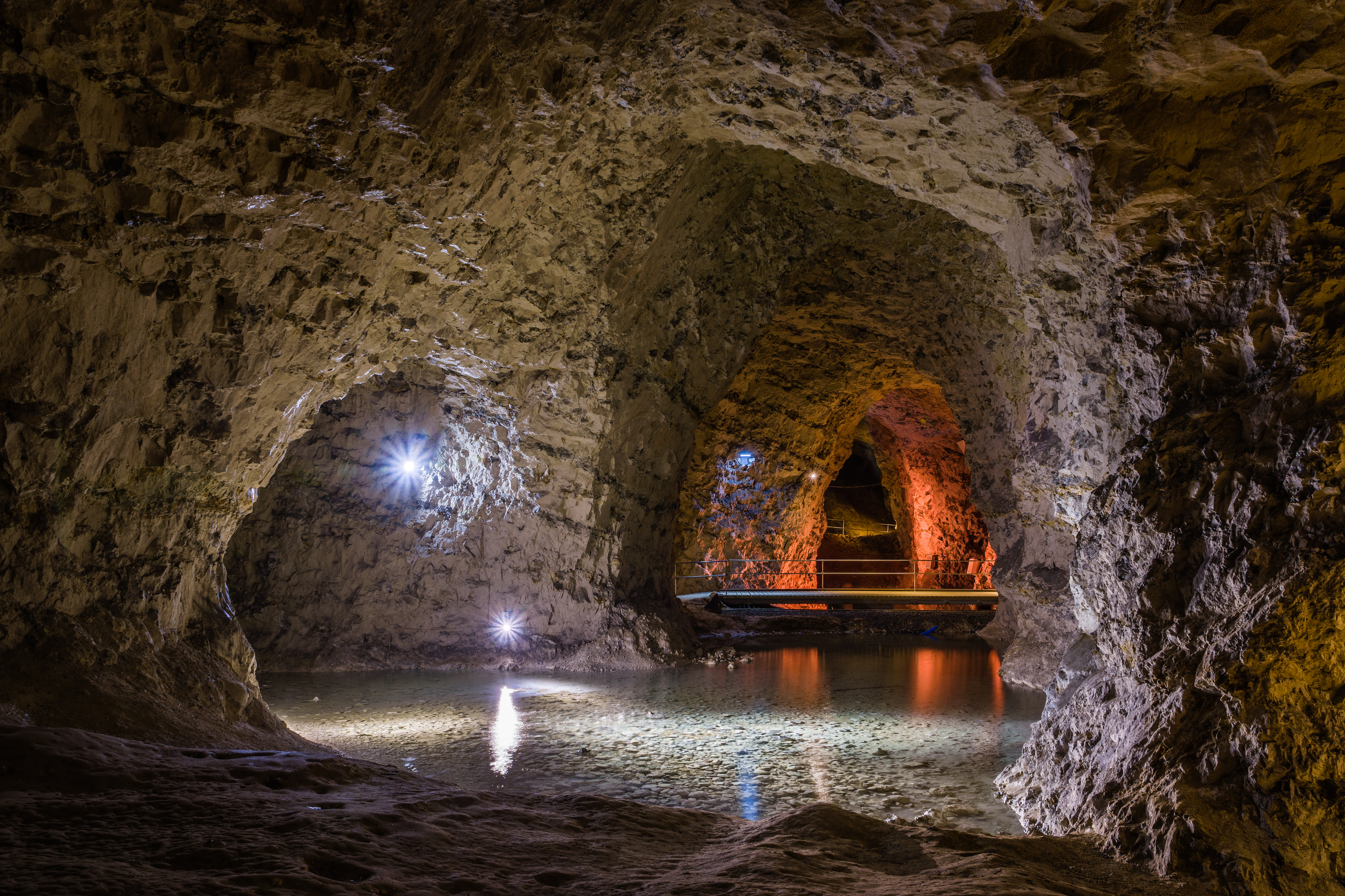
Mønsted Limestone Mine

Mønsted Kalkgruber, the largest limestone mine in the world, is located just northwest of the village.
