= Ørum (Sønderlyng) =

- town
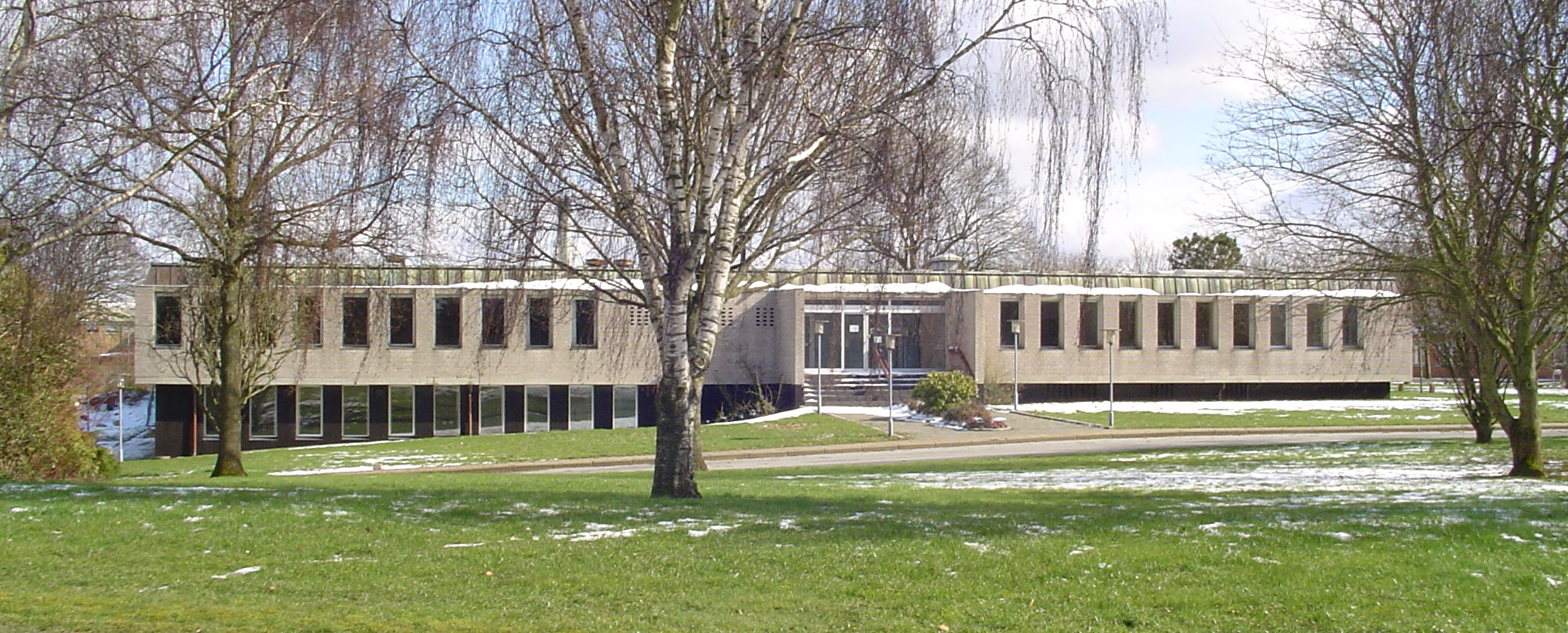
- The old townhall building in Ørum for the former Tjele Municipality.

- Location in Denmark Ørum (Central Denmark Region)
- Coordinates: 56.48070°N 9.62402°E
- Country: Denmark
- Region: Central Denmark (Midtjylland)
- Municipality: Viborg

Area
  - Urban: 1.1 km^{2} (0.42 sq mi)

Population (2026)
  - Urban: 1,511
  - Urban density: 1,400/km^{2} (3,600/sq mi)
- Time zone: UTC+1 (CET)
  - Summer (DST): UTC+2 (CEST)
- Postal code: DK-8830 Tjele

Ørum is a small Danish town with a population of 1,511 (1 January 2026), on the road between Viborg and Randers. To distinguish it from other places in Denmark, it is referred to as Ørum Sønderlyng or sometimes Ørum Tjele.

Ørum was the former municipal seat for Tjele Municipality. In 2007, it was merged with other municipalities into Viborg Municipality.

== Notable people ==
- Frank Hvam (born 1970) a Danish stand-up-comedian was born in Viborg and grew up on a farm in Ørum Sønderlyng
- Martin Hoberg Hedegaard or Saveus (born 1992) a Danish singer, songwriter and record producer
