= Stoholm =

- Town
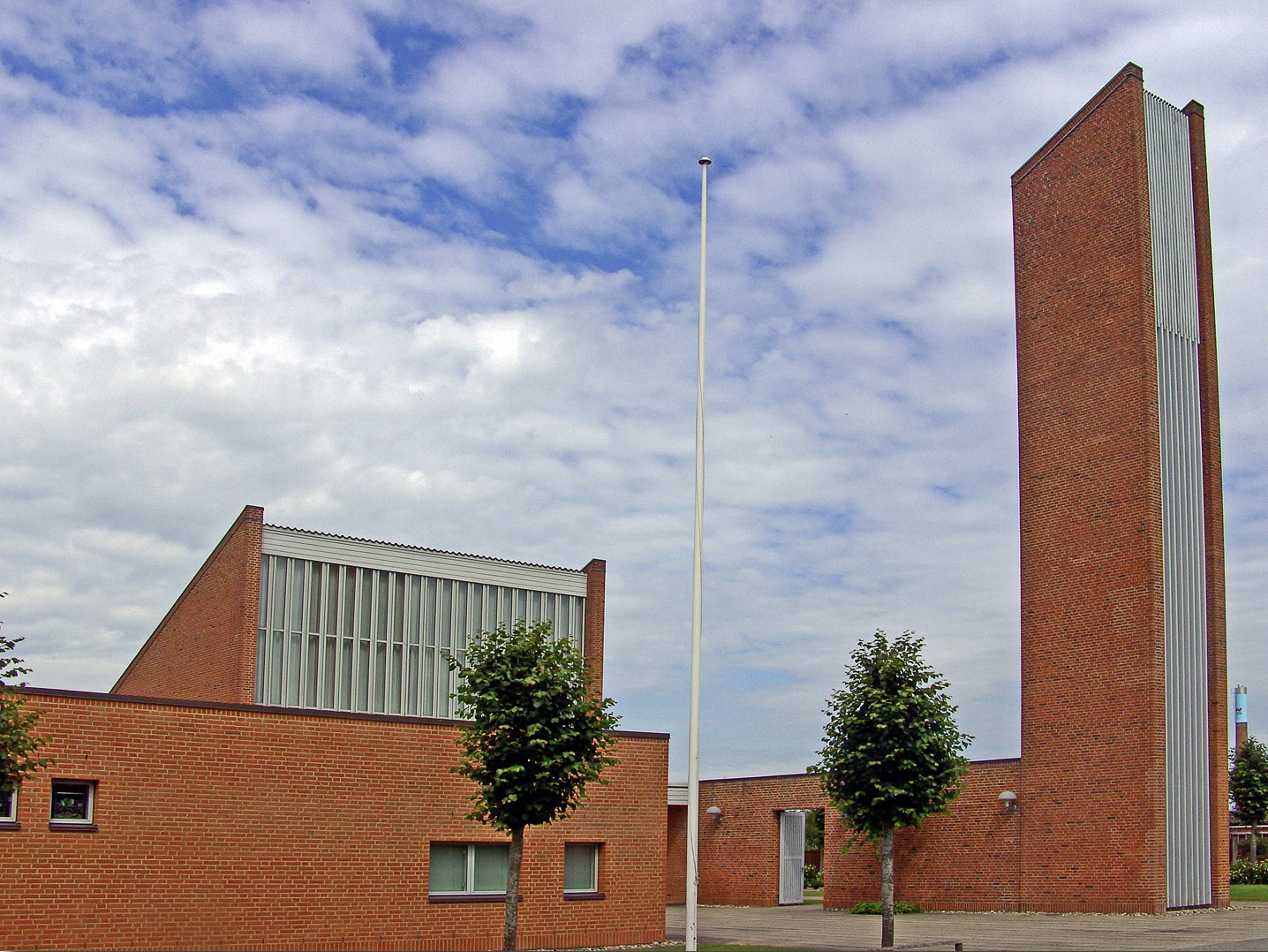
- Stoholm Church

- Location within Denmark Location within Central Denmark Region
- Coordinates: 56°29′3″N 9°8′52″E
- Country: Denmark
- Region: Central Denmark (Midtjylland)
- Municipality: Viborg

Area
  - Urban: 1.9 km^{2} (0.73 sq mi)

Population (2026)
  - Urban: 2,544
  - Urban density: 1,300/km^{2} (3,500/sq mi)
- Time zone: UTC+1 (Central European Time)
  - Summer (DST): UTC+2 (Central European Summer Time)

Stoholm is a railway town in Viborg Municipality, Denmark, located 15 km southeast of Skive, 28 km north of Karup and 18 km west of Viborg.

Stoholm was the municipal seat of the now abolished Fjends Municipality.

== Transportation ==
Stoholm is located on the Langå–Struer railway line and is served by Stoholm railway station.
