= Skals =

- Town
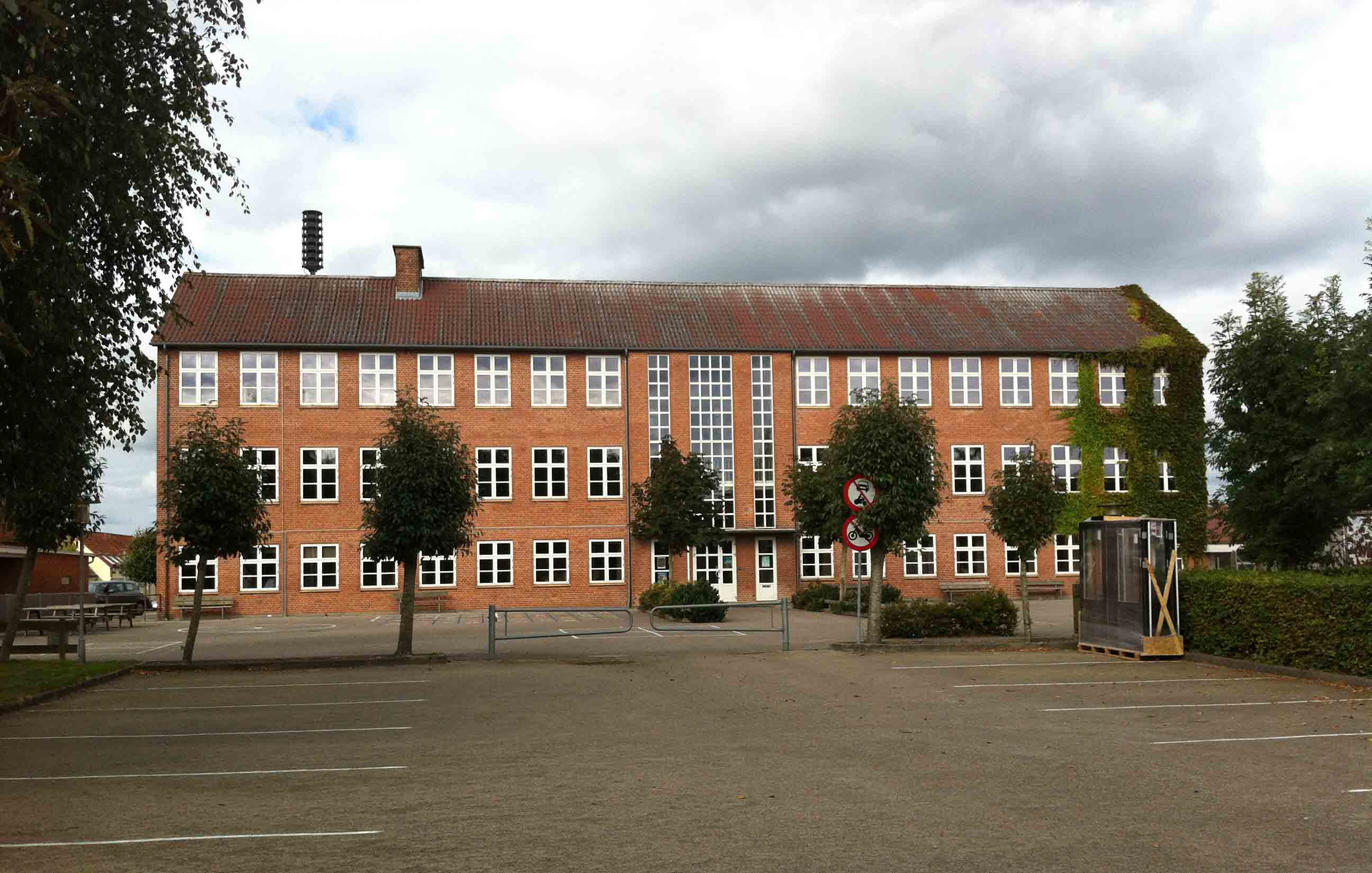
- Skals public school

- Location within Denmark Location within Central Denmark Region
- Coordinates: 56°33′42″N 9°24′7″E
- Country: Denmark
- Region: Central Denmark (Midtjylland)
- Municipality: Viborg

Area
  - Urban: 1.5 km^{2} (0.58 sq mi)

Population (2026)
  - Urban: 1,748
  - Urban density: 1,200/km^{2} (3,000/sq mi)
- Time zone: UTC+1 (Central European Time)
  - Summer (DST): UTC+2 (Central European Summer Time)
- Postal code: DK-8832 Skals

Skals is a town, with a population of 1,748 (1 January 2026), in Viborg Municipality, Central Denmark Region in Denmark. It is located 18 km south of Aalestrup and 13 km north of Viborg.

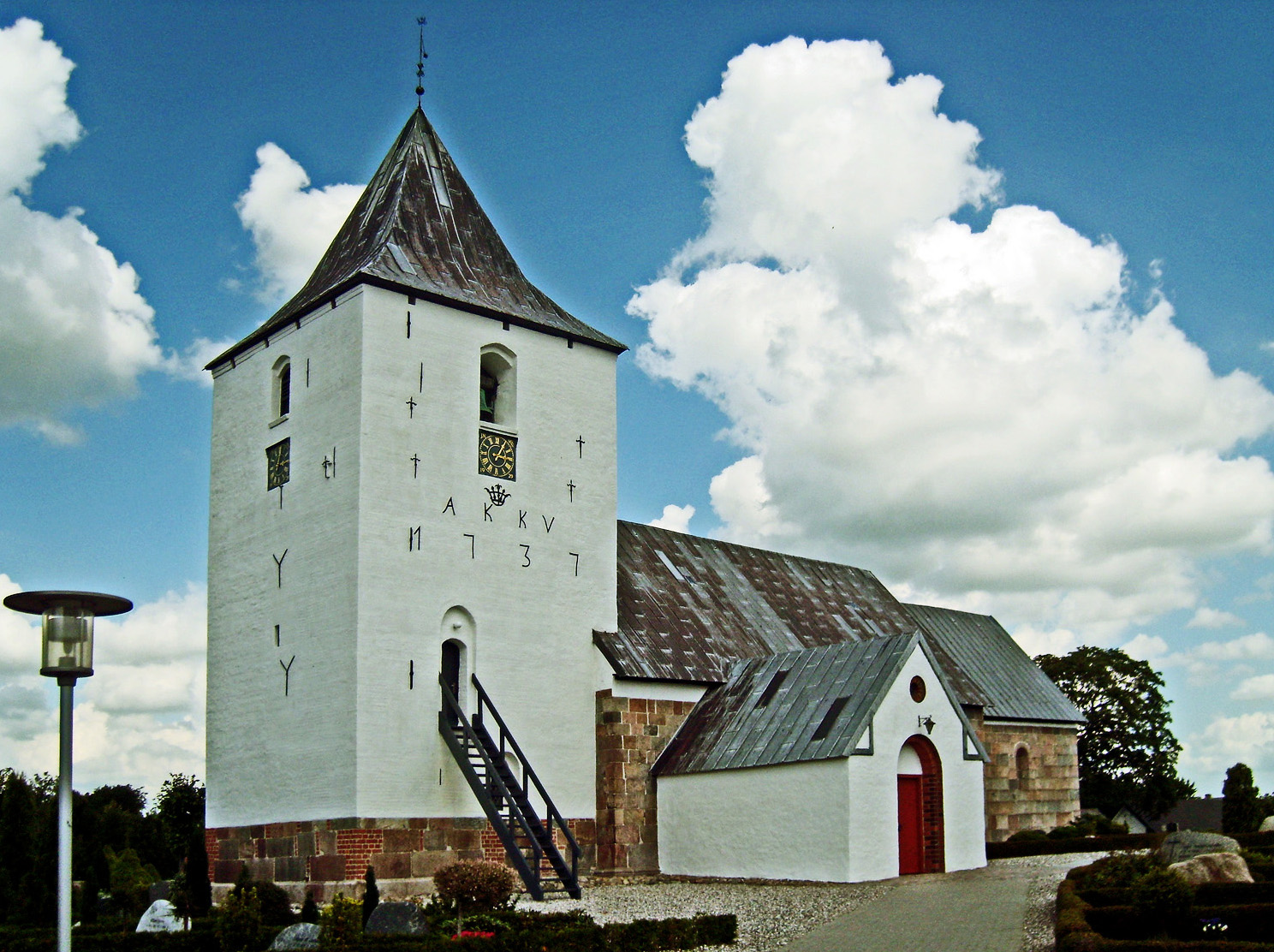
Skals Church

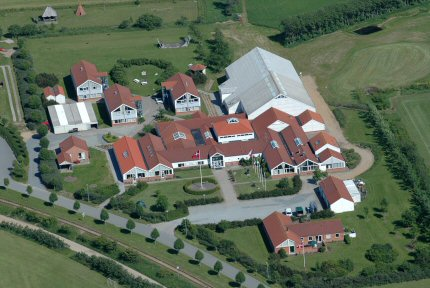
Aerial photograph of Skals International Efterskole

Skals Church and Skals International Efterskole are located in the town.
