= Viborg County =

Former County in western Denmark

Coordinates: 56°26′N 9°24′E

Viborg County Viborg Amt (Danish)
- County of Denmark
- Coat of arms

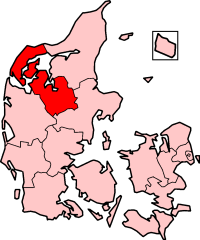
- Viborg County in Denmark
- Seat: Viborg

Area
  - Total: 4,122 km^{2} (1,592 sq mi)

Population (2006)
  - Total: 234,896
  - Density: 56.99/km^{2} (147.6/sq mi)

Viborg County (Danish: Viborg Amt) is a former county (Danish: amt) in the north-central part of the Jutland peninsula in western Denmark. The county was abolished on 1 January 2007, when most of it merged into Region Midtjylland (i.e. Region Central Jutland). A smaller portion merged into Region Nordjylland (Region North Jutland).

== List of County Mayors ==
From	To	County Mayor
1 April 1970	31 December 1989	Peter E. Eriksen (Venstre)
1 January 1990	31 December 2006	Bent Hansen (Social Democrat)

== List of County Governors ==
- Florian Martensen-Larsen (1970–1981)
- Jørgen Hansen Koch (1981–1987)
- Karl Johan Christensen (1988–1995)
- Bent Klinte (1995–2004)
- Erik Møller (2004–2006)

== Municipalities (1970–2006) ==
- Bjerringbro municipality
- Fjends municipality
- Hanstholm municipality
- Hvorslev municipality
- Karup municipality
- Kjellerup municipality
- Morsø municipality
- Møldrup municipality
- Sallingsund municipality
- Skive municipality
- Spøttrup municipality
- Sundsøre municipality
- Sydthy municipality
- Thisted municipality
- Tjele municipality
- Viborg municipality
- Aalestrup municipality
