= Løgstrup =

- Town
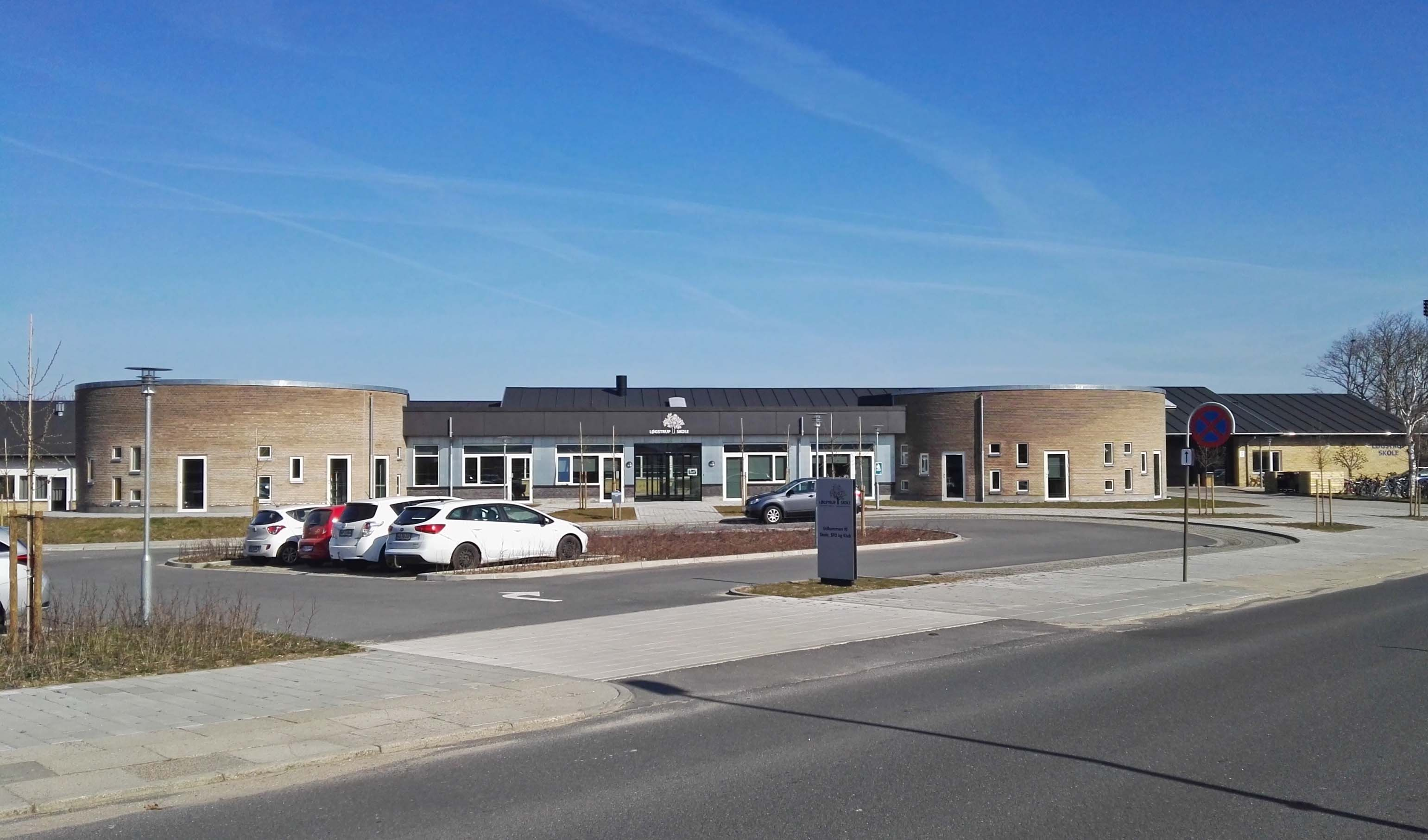
- Løgstrup School

- Location within Denmark Location within Central Denmark Region
- Coordinates: 56°30′39″N 9°20′6″E
- Country: Denmark
- Region: Central Denmark (Midtjylland)
- Municipality: Viborg

Area
  - Urban: 1.3 km^{2} (0.50 sq mi)

Population (2026)
  - Urban: 1,881
  - Urban density: 1,400/km^{2} (3,700/sq mi)
- Time zone: UTC+1 (Central European Time)
  - Summer (DST): UTC+2 (Central European Summer Time)
- Postal code: DK-8831 Løgstrup

Løgstrup is a town in Viborg Municipality, Central Denmark Region in Denmark. The town has a population of 1,881 as of 1 January 2026. It is located 30 km southwest of Aalestrup, 22 km southeast of Skive and 10 km northwest of Viborg.
