= Birgitte Wilbek =

Danish handball and basketball player (1928–2025)

Birgitte Wilbek (née Harms 28 November 1928 – 30 September 2025) was a Danish handball and basketball player, who represented Denmark on both national teams.

== Background ==
Wilbek was born in Hørsholm, Denmark on 28 November 1928. She was married to Erik Wilbek, Denmark men's national basketball team player. Their son Ulrik Wilbek would, like his mother go on to be both the head coach of the Denmark women's national handball team and be on the Team Danmark board. Their niece, Lise Wilbek, is a track and field athlete and was Danish champion at both 100 and 200 m sprints in 1977. In 1983 Birgitte Wilbek married Svend Oluf Hansen.

Wilber died on 30 September 2025, at the age of 96.

== Playing career ==
Wilbek started her trajectory in sports by doing gymnastics at Frederiksberg IF, starting in 1943. As sports seasons at the time were not full year activities, she started playing handball in the winter to complement the mostly summer gymnastics.

In 1946, she was involved in creating the basketball department at FIF.

Wilbek was included in the Denmark women's national basketball team 14 times and participated in two European Championships in 1954 and 1956.

In handball, she played all 32 Denmark national team matches between 1949 and 1957. She won the Danish Championship with Frederiksberg IF in 1956. She retired after the inaugural World Women's Handball Championship in 1957.

From 1963 to 1965, she was the head coach of the Denmark women's national handball team together with Else Birkmose. They were the first women to hold this position.

== Civil career ==
Wilbek was educated as a teacher at Blågård Seminarium in 1953. She later worked at Trongårdsskolen in Lyngby, near Copenhagen. In 1979, she became the principal at the school.

In 1964, she was co-founder of the athletics club Trongårdens Idrætsforening. In 1971, she was awarded Lyngby-Taarbæk Municipality's sports award for her engagement in the club.

Between 1985 and 1991, Wilbek was part of the board at Team Danmark. In the 1960's, she was on the board of the Dansk Idræts-Forbund, where she drew attention to the lack of women's representation in the organisation.
