= Wilbekin =

Wilbekin is a surname. Notable people with the surname include:

- Emil Wilbekin (born 1967), American journalist
- Scottie Wilbekin (born 1993), American-Turkish basketball player
