= Aalestrup Municipality =

Former municipality in North Jutland Region, Denmark

Aalestrup Municipality Aalestrup Kommune
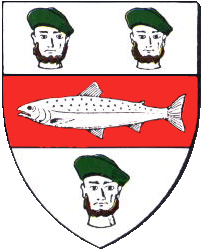
- Coat of arms

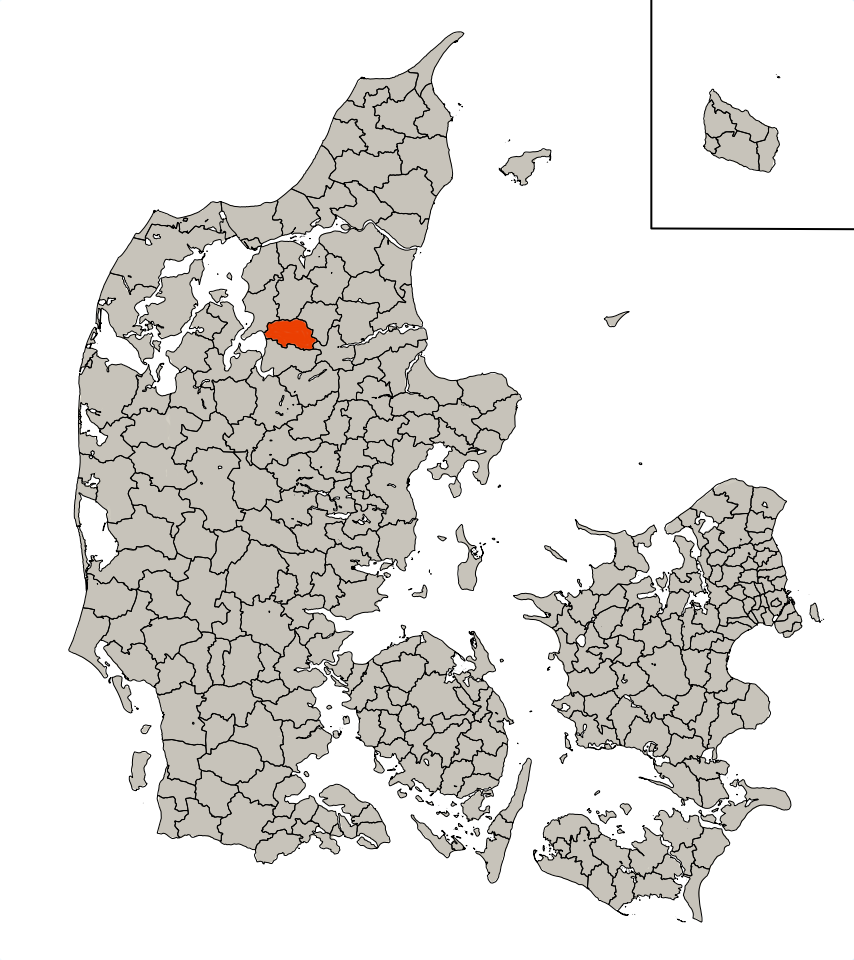
- Aalestrup Municipality's location in Denmark, 1970–2007.
- Coordinates: 56°42′N 9°30′E
- Country: Denmark
- Region: Region of North Jutland
- Established: 1 April 1970
- Disestablished: 1 January 2007
- Seat: Aalestrup

Government
  - Mayor: Rigmor Sandborg

Area
  - Land: 175.73 km^{2} (67.85 sq mi)
- Time zone: UTC1 (CET)
  - Summer (DST): UTC2 (CEST)

Aalestrup Municipality was a municipality (Danish, kommune) in Viborg County, Denmark which existed from 1970 until it ceased to exist as a result of the Municipal reform of 2007. Today the region is part of Vesthimmerland Municipality in the North Jutland Region.

The main town and the site of its municipal council was the town of Aalestrup. The municipality was located on the eastern shores of the area known as Himmerland, a part of the Jutland peninsula; the western border of the municipality was partially defined by the waters of Lovn's Broadening (Lovns Bredning).

== History ==
By 2005, the municipality covered an area of 176 km^{2}, and had a total population of 7,631. Its final mayor was Rigmor Sandborg. On 1 January 2007 Aalestrup municipality ceased and was merged with the former Farsø, Løgstør, and Aars municipalities to form the new Vesthimmerland Municipality. This created a new municipality with an area of 815 km^{2} and a total population of 39,176 (2005).

== Shield ==
The upper part has two heads on a white background, the middle has a red band with a fish on it, and the bottom is white with one head.
