= Fjends Municipality =

Former municipality in Denmark

Coordinates: 56°29′03″N 9°08′58″E

Until 1 January 2007, Fjends municipality was a municipality (Danish, kommune) in Viborg County on the Jutland peninsula in northern Denmark. The municipality covered an area of 236 km^{2}, and had a total population of 8,152 (2005). Its last mayor was Svend Aage Jensen, a member of the Venstre (Liberal Party) political party. The main town and the site of its municipal council was the town of Stoholm.

Fjends municipality ceased to exist as the result of Kommunalreformen ("The Municipality Reform" of 2007). It was merged with Bjerringbro, Karup, Møldrup, Tjele, and Viborg municipalities to form an enlarged Viborg municipality. This created a municipality with an area of 1,390 km^{2} and a total population of 88,945 (2005). The municipality belongs to Region Midtjylland ("Mid-Jutland Region").
