= Frederiks =

- Town
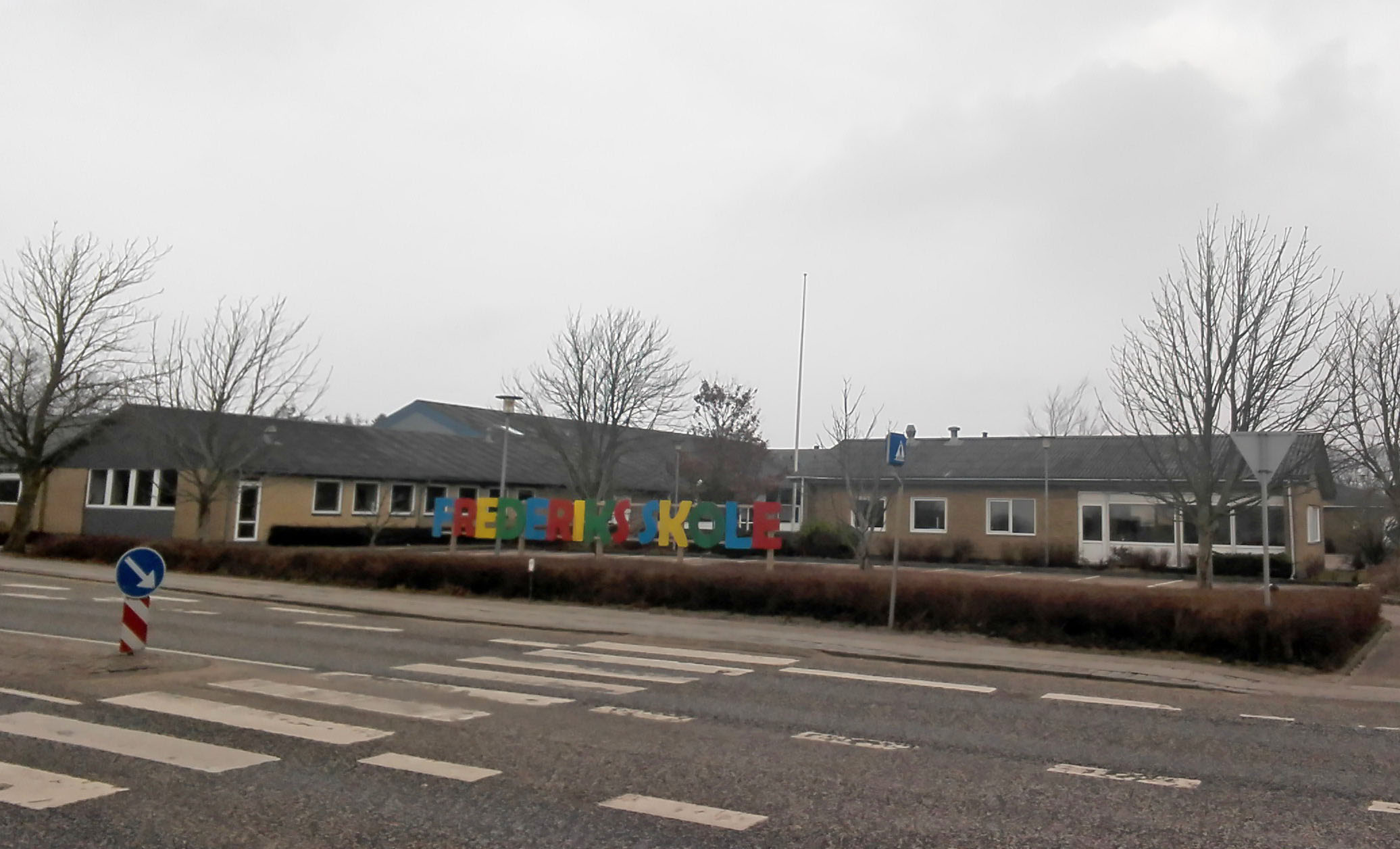
- Frederiks School

- Location in Denmark Frederiks (Central Denmark Region)
- Coordinates: 56°20′23.34″N 9°15′9.32″E
- Country: Denmark
- Region: Central Denmark (Midtjylland)
- Municipality: Viborg
- Founded: 1906

Area
  - Urban: 1.36 km^{2} (0.53 sq mi)

Population (2026)
  - Urban: 1,775
  - Urban density: 1,310/km^{2} (3,380/sq mi)
- Time zone: UTC+1 (CET)
  - Summer (DST): UTC+2 (CEST)
- Postal code: 7470 Karup J

Frederiks is a small Danish town with a population of 1,775 (1 January 2026), on the road between Viborg and Herning. It is located in Viborg Municipality in central Jutland.

Frederiks is located 8 km northeast of Karup, 32 km northeast of Herning, 31 km southeast of Skive and 18 km southwest of Viborg.

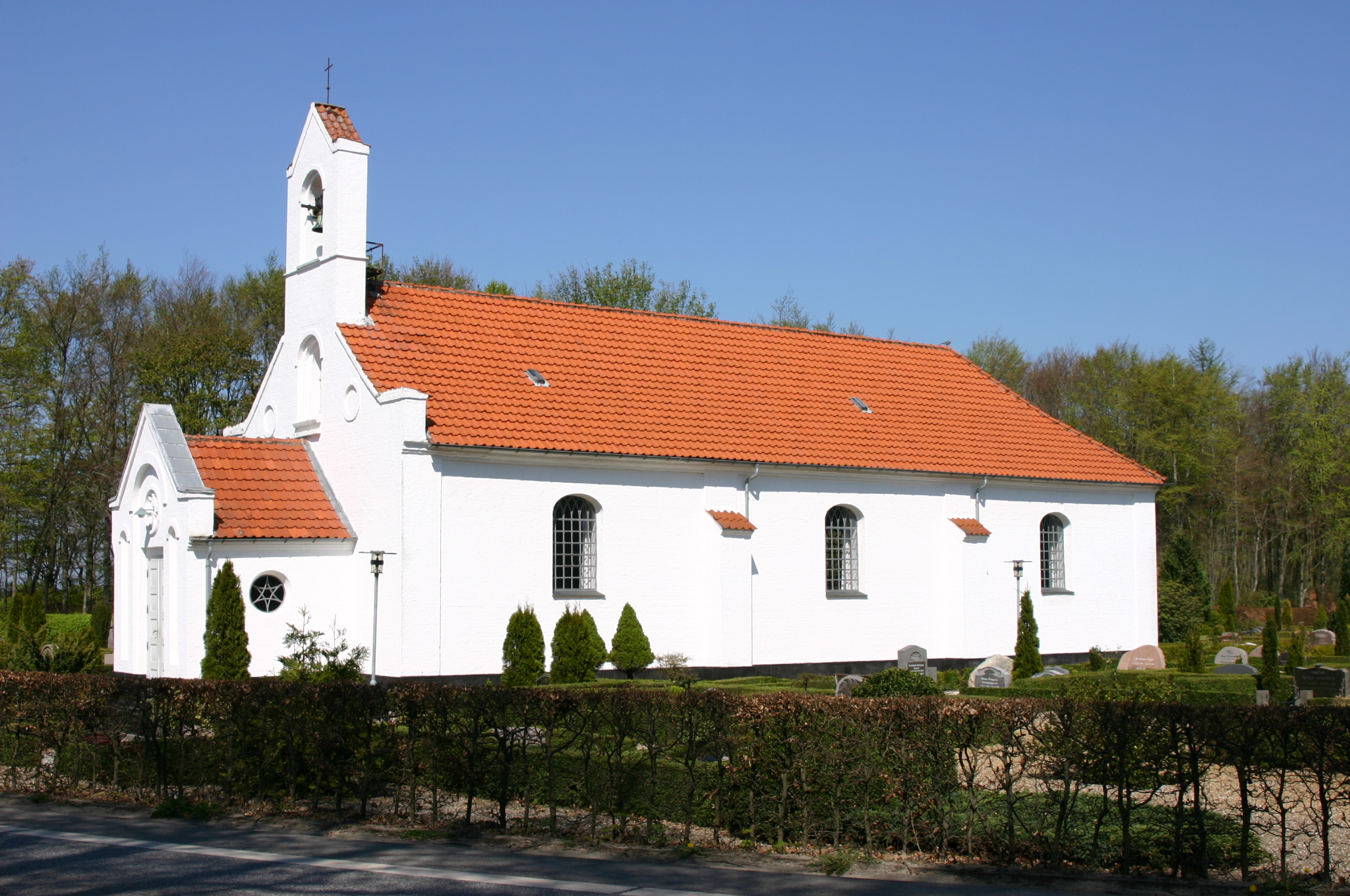
Frederiks Church

Frederiks Church, built in 1766 as a longhouse, is located on the northwestern outskirts of the town.
