= Karup Municipality =

Former municipality in Denmark

Coordinates: 56°18′27″N 9°9′55″E

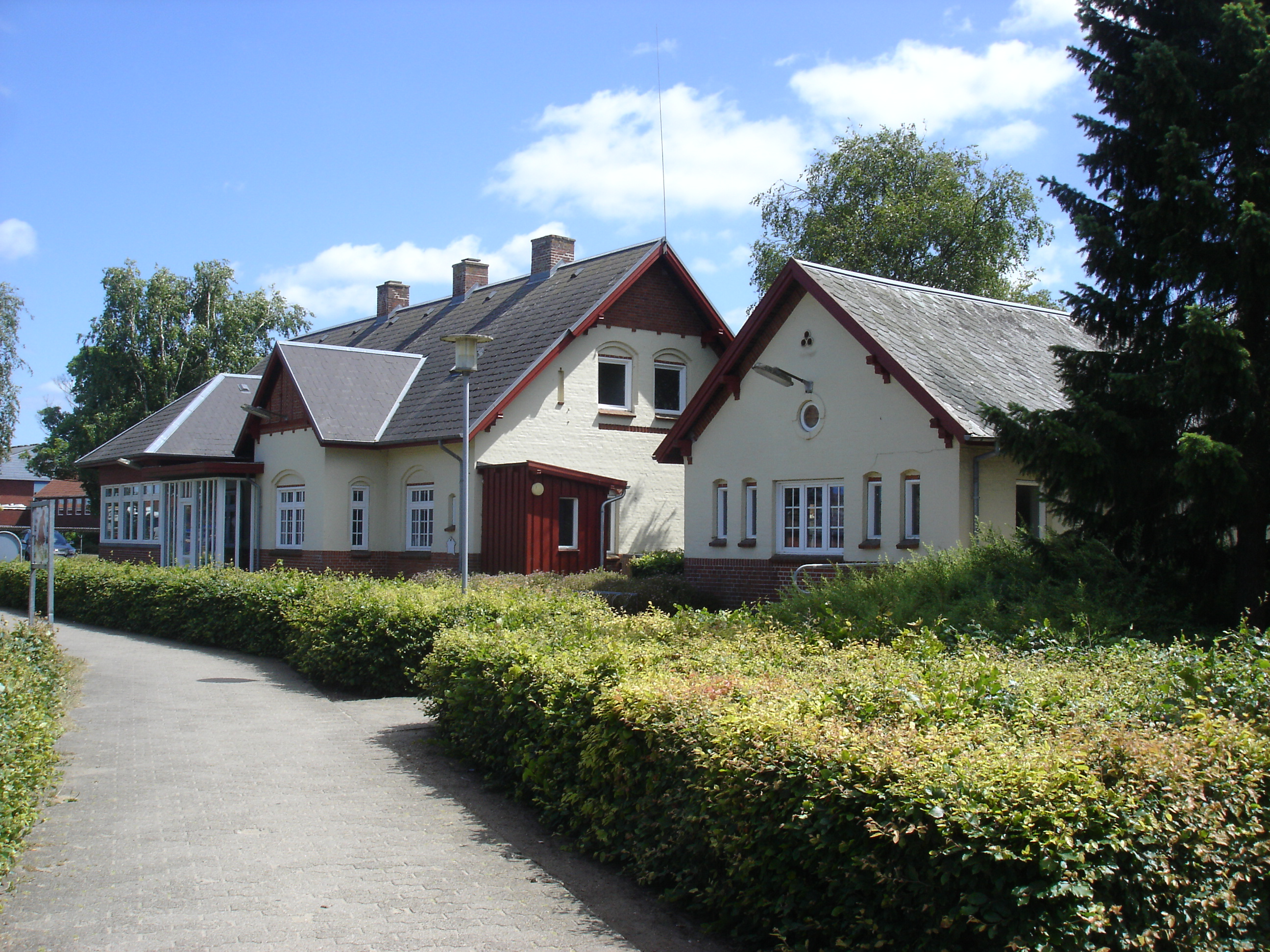
Karup Station

Karup municipality was a municipality (Danish, kommune) in Viborg County until 1 January 2007. The municipality covered an area of 163 km^{2}, and had a total population of 6,709 (2005). Its last mayor was Kjeld Merstrand, a member of the Social Democrats (Socialdemokraterne) political party. The main town and the site of its municipal council was the town of Karup.

Karup municipality ceased to exist as the result of Kommunalreformen ("The Municipality Reform" of 2007). It was merged, with Bjerringbro, Fjends, Møldrup, Tjele, and Viborg municipalities to form an enlarged Viborg municipality. This created a municipality with an area of 1,390 km^{2} and a total population of 88,945 (2005). The municipality belongs to Region Midtjylland ("Mid-Jutland Region").

== Official symbols ==
The municipality uses a coat of arms depicting a Black Grouse (in Danish: urfugl), a bird once typical for many areas in Jutland, but now extinct in Denmark. The municipality is one of the few Danish municipalities using its own flag; it is white with the coat of arms in the centre.
