= Ulrik Wilbek =

Danish politician and former handball coach

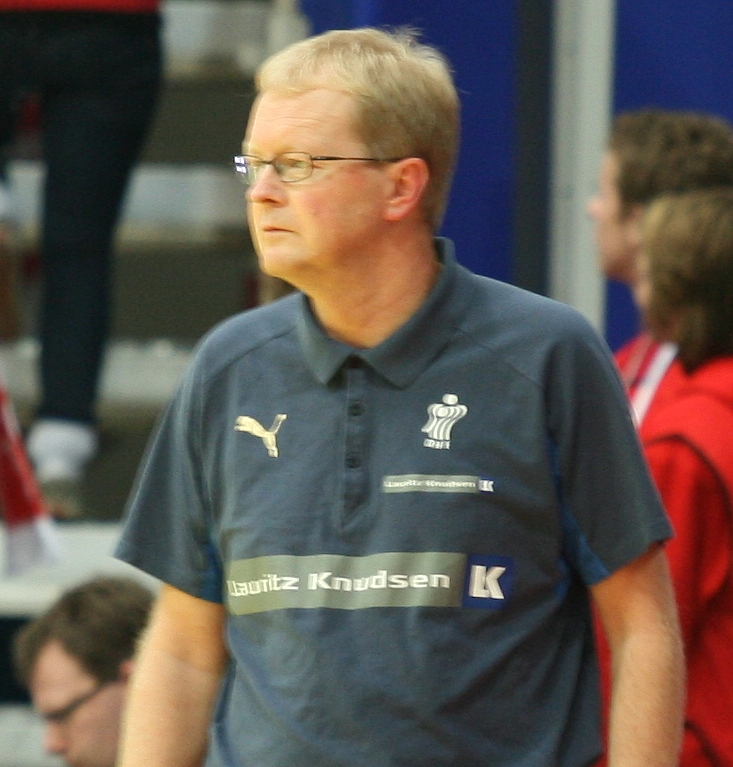
- Wilbek in 2007

Mayor of Viborg Municipality
- In office 1 January 2018 – 1 January 2026
- Preceded by: Torsten Nielsen
- Succeeded by: Katrine Fusager Rohde

Personal details
- Born: 13 April 1958 (age 68) Tunis, Tunisia
- Party: Venstre
- Spouse: Susanne Munk Wilbek
- Children: 3
- Parent: Birgitte Wilbek (mother)
- Education: Jonstrup Seminarium
- Handball career
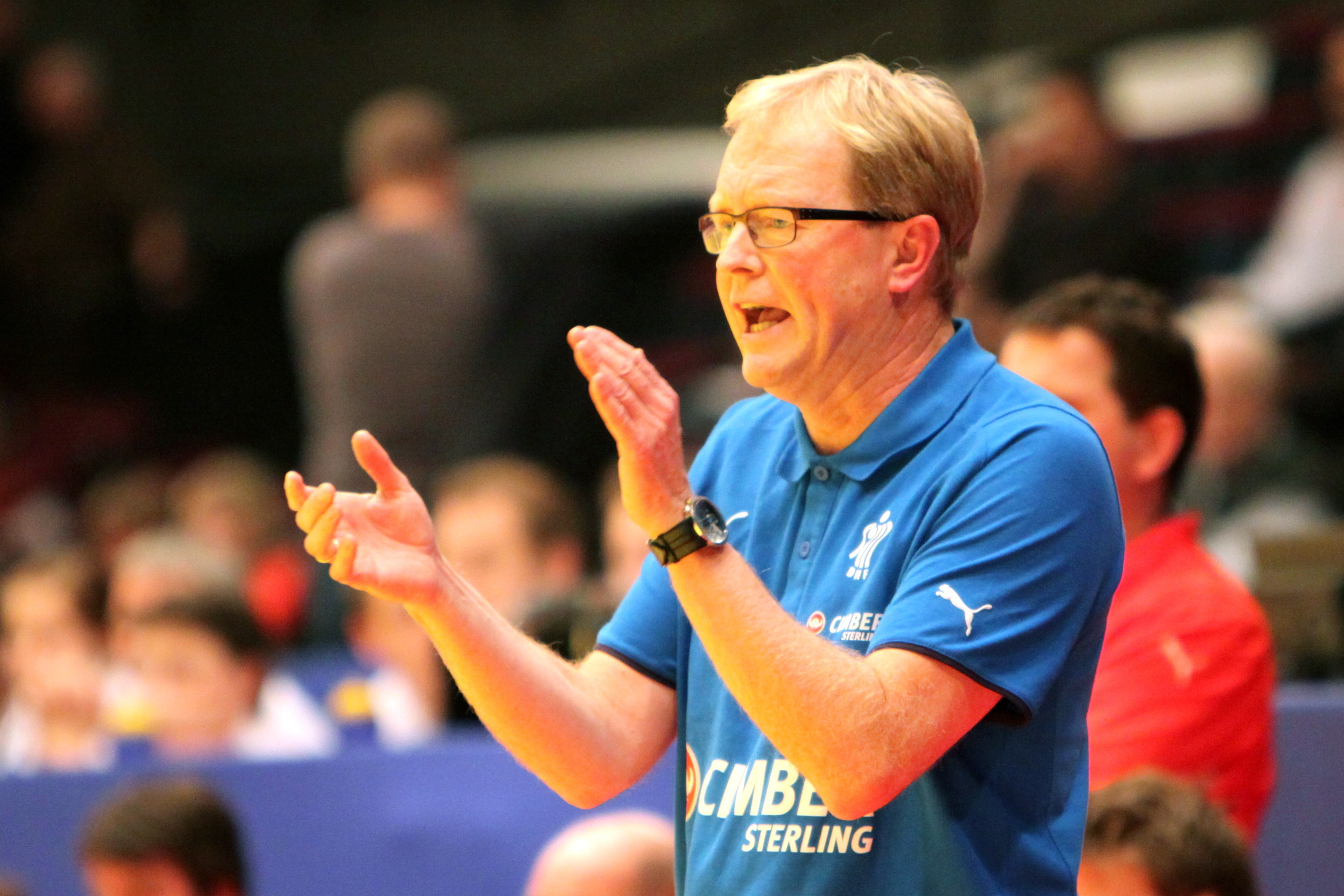
- Sport: Handball

Teams managed
- Years: Team
- 1985–1988: Virum-Sorgenfri HK (men)
- 1988–1991: Viborg HK (women)
- 1992–1997: Denmark women
- 1998–2002: Viborg HK (women)
- 2002–2005: Viborg HK (men)
- 2005–2014: Denmark men
Medal record
Denmark
Coach for men's handball
World Championships
Silver medal – second place	2013 Spain	Team
Silver medal – second place	2011 Sweden	Team
Bronze medal – third place	2007 Germany	Team
European Championships
Gold medal – first place	2012 Serbia	Team
Gold medal – first place	2008 Norway	Team
Silver medal – second place	2014 Denmark	Team
Bronze medal – third place	2006 Switzerland	Team
Coach for women's handball
Olympic Games
Bronze medal – third place	Personality Awards	Team
Gold medal – first place	1996 Atlanta	Team
World Championships
Gold medal – first place	1997 Germany	Team
Silver medal – second place	1993 Norway	Team
Bronze medal – third place	1995 Austria	Team
European Championships
Gold medal – first place	1996 Denmark	Team
Gold medal – first place	1994 Germany	Team

Ulrik Wilbek (born 13 April 1958) is a former professional handball coach and politician who also was the former Mayor of Viborg Municipality from 2018 to 2025. He is the second most successful Danish team handball coach ever, having won two European Men's Handball Championship and two European Women's Handball Championships, one IHF World Women's Handball Championship and one Olympic gold medal with the women.

He was the head coach for the Danish men's national handball team from 2005-2014. He led the Danish team to win the 2008 European Men's Handball Championship in Norway, the 2012 European Men's Handball Championship and obtained silver at the 2011 World Men's Handball Championship in Sweden, and bronze medals both at the 2006 European Men's Handball Championship in Switzerland and at the 2007 World Men's Handball Championship in Germany.

He is married to former handball player Susanne Munk Wilbek. His mother, Birgitte Wilbek, played for the Danish Women's national team in Handball, and his father, Erik Wilbek, played for the Danish Basketball national team. His cousin, Lise Wilbek, was Danish national champion in 100 metres and 200 metres sprint.

== Handball coaching career ==
=== Women's national team ===
Wilbek's first international successes came as coach for the Danish Women's national youth team in the late 1980s. Here he first coached players like Anja Andersen and his wife-to-be Susanne Munk Lauritsen. A few years later, he was asked to be coach for the national A-team, which nearly was closed in the early 1990s due to bad results. Wilbek took the challenge and promoted a couple of the youth players, and the team had its first success as finalist in the 1993 World Women's Handball Championship, losing only after extra time.

In the following years, Wilbek was in the lead of the team, that became one of the most successful national handball teams of all times and at the same time one of the most popular teams in Danish sport. With key players such as Anja Andersen, Lene Rantala and Camilla Andersen, the team was European Champions in 1994 and won bronze medals at 1995 World Championship. The peak of the team was reached at the end of 1997, when the team was reigning World Champions (1997), European Champions (1996), and Olympic Champions (1996). This was the first time in handball history that a national team held all 3 major titles at the same time and only 2 other national teams have accomplished it since. It also marked the end of Wilbek's career as coach for the women's national team, having won everything. The team under his leadership earned the nickname the iron ladies or De Jernhårde Ladies in Danish The team sparked a cultural change in Denmark, where women's handball were considered unserious and amateurish to being an important part of Danish culture.

=== Club handball ===
Wilbek's initial work as a handball coach was in his own club, Virum-Sorgenfri Håndboldklub, in 1985–88 (elite men). Just turned 30, he came to Viborg HK as a coach for the ambitious women's team, which by then had just been promoted to the Danish top league. Within a few years, he led the club to their first medals (silver in 1991), and the Danish National team now wanted him as a coach for the women's team.

After five successful years as national coach, Wilbek again turned towards club coaching. He was reappointed as coach for Viborg HK's elite women, and again he demonstrated success: The team became national champions for four consecutive years from 1998 to 2002 and reached the final in the 2001 EHF Champions League.

=== Men's national team ===
He now needed new challenges and turned towards the club's men's team in the early 2000s. This marked Wilbek's least successful period as a coach with no medals won. But he was still popular within the national handball association, and in 2005 he was appointed coach of the national men's team, replacing Torben Winther. In 2006 he led the team to a 3rd-place finish at the European Championships and in 2007 they finished 3rd in the World Championship. In 2008 he led the team to first place in the 2008 European Championship. This was Denmark's first ever gold medals at a major international tournament.

At the 2011 and 2013 World Championships he lost two consequtive finals to France and Spain respectively. The 2013 final against Spain was a horrendous game for Denmark, losing with a record-breaking 16 goals (35-19).

In October 2013, it was announced that Ulrik Wilbek would be replaced as the head coach for Denmark on 1 July 2014 by Gudmundur Gudmundsson.

== Danish Handball Federation ==
In 2016, after four years as a manager for the Danish Handball Federation DHF, Ulrik Wilbek was submitting his resignation to the federation.

The termination comes after the internal disturbances during the 2016 Summer Olympics, where Ulrik contacted bearing profiles of the men's national team to discuss coach Guðmundur Guðmundsson future before the finals and asked the players if they felt if the coach Guðmundsson was fired. Some days after this scandal, Denmark won the gold medal at the event. After the controversy, Ulrik handed over his responsibilities to others in DHF, and then used his energy on the local political work in Viborg.

As a reaction, Gudmundsson announced in November 2016 that he would not renew his contract, which was set to expire on 1 July 2017. After Gudmundssons departure from the Denmark team, he criticized Wilbek, who was then the head of the Danish Handball Federation, for repeated attempts to undercut his management of the team during the Olympics.

== Political career ==
Ulrik Wilbek was a member of the city council of Viborg for the political party Venstre from 1998 to 2001.

After retiring from handball, he was elected to Viborg city council again in the municipal elections in November 2017. In 2021 he was reelected, receiving one 6th of all votes in Viborg. In 2025 he announced that he would not rerun. He was replaced by Katrine Fusager Rohde from Venstre, who later won the election.

Since 2019 he has been a board member at Kommunernes Landsforening, the Danish organisation for municipalities.
