= Karup =

- Town
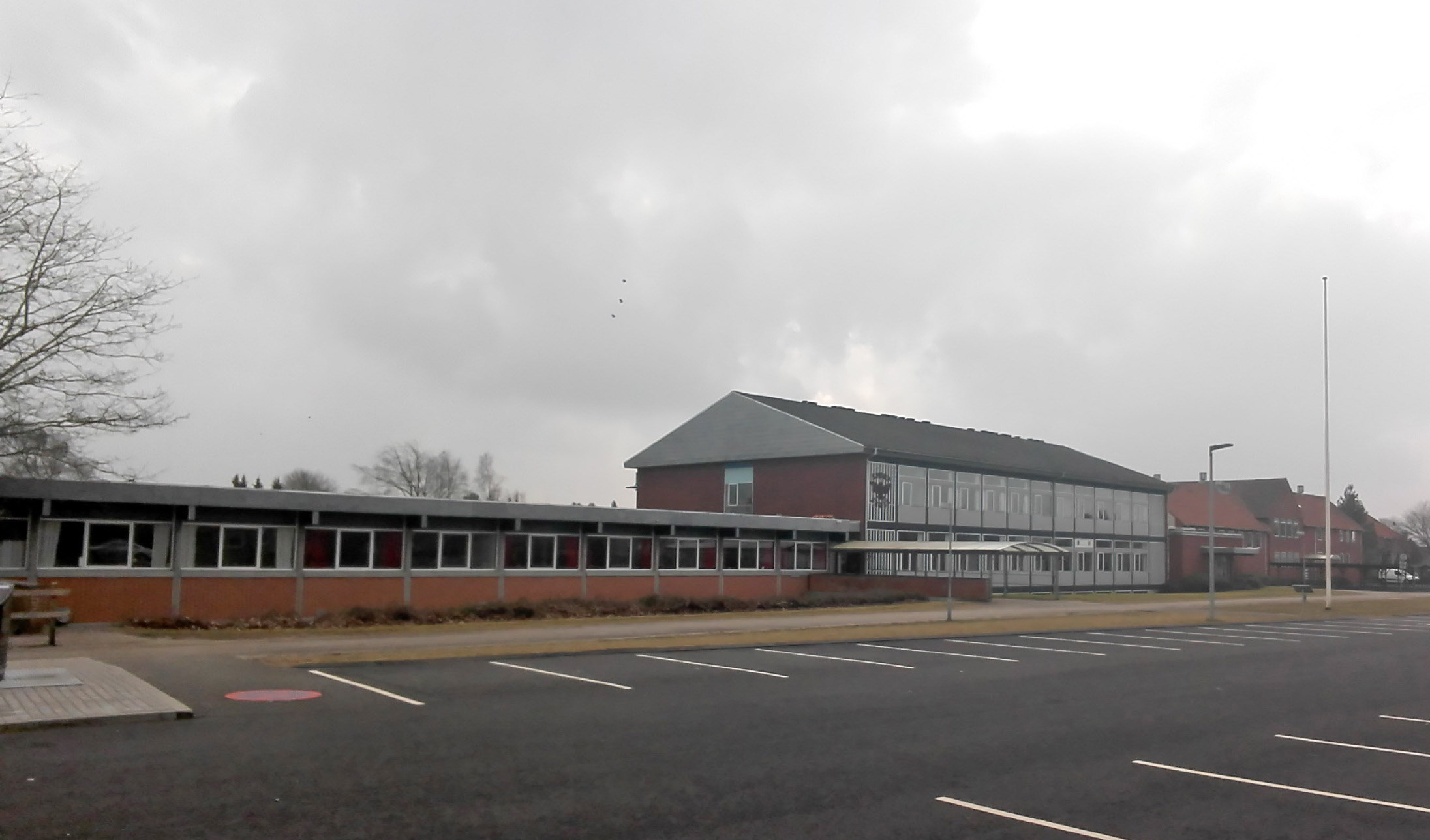
- Karup School

- Location within Denmark Location within Central Denmark Region
- Coordinates: 56°18′31″N 9°10′6″E
- Country: Denmark
- Region: Central Denmark (Midtjylland)
- Municipality: Viborg

Area
  - Urban: 2 km^{2} (0.77 sq mi)

Population (2026)
  - Urban: 2,182
  - Urban density: 1,100/km^{2} (2,800/sq mi)
- Time zone: UTC+1 (Central European Time)
  - Summer (DST): UTC+2 (Central European Summer Time)
- Postal code: DK-7470 Karup J

Karup is a town, with a population of 2,182 (1 January 2026), in Viborg Municipality, Central Denmark Region in Denmark. It is located 24 km northeast of Herning, 34 km south of Skive and 23 southwest of Viborg.

Karup was the municipal seat of the former Karup Municipality until 1. January 2007.

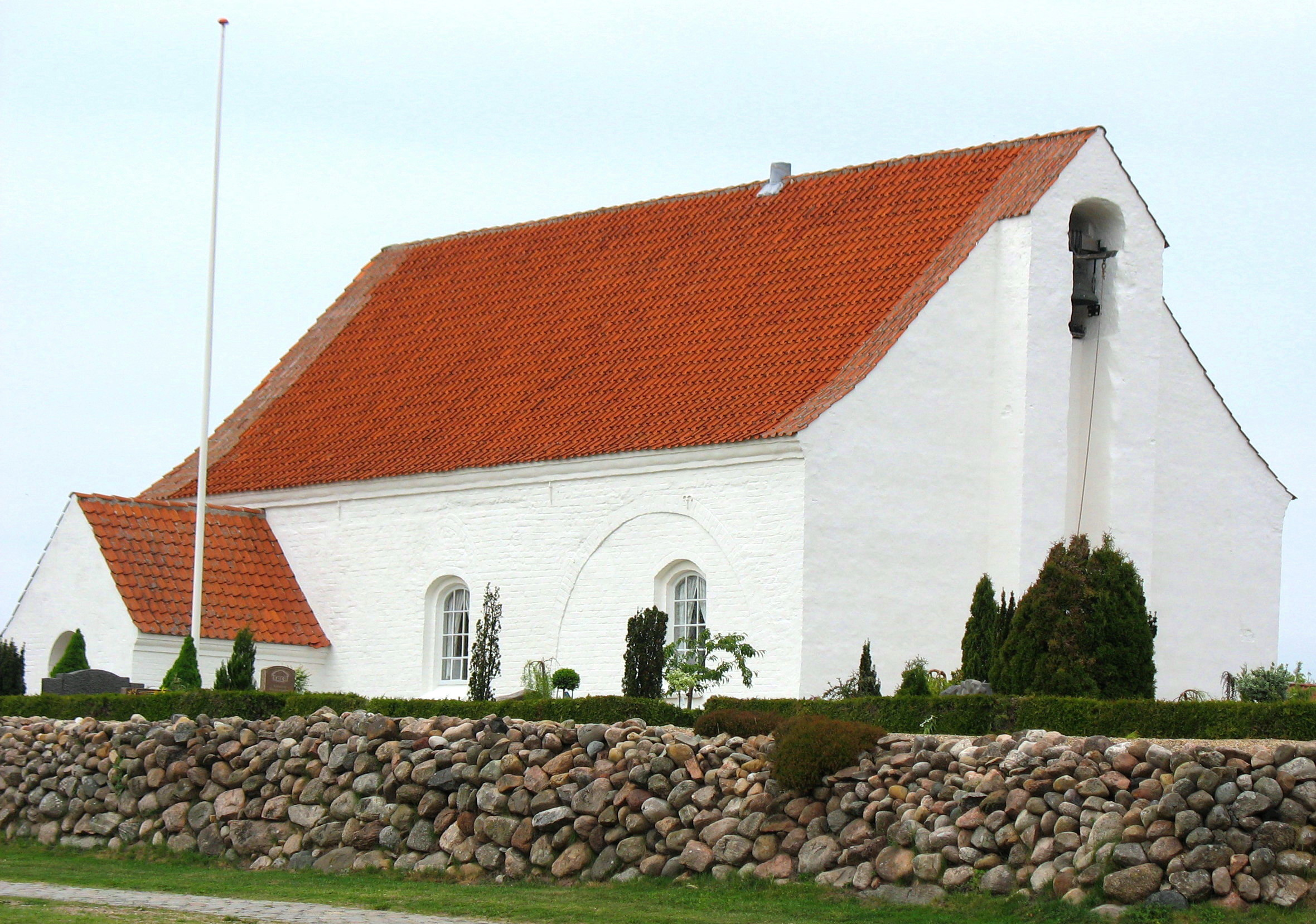
Karup Church

Karup Church, a late Gothic longhouse in monk bricks to which was added a porch to the south in 1940, is located in the town.

Both the civilian airport Midtjyllands Airport and the military Air Base Karup are situated 3 km southwest of the town by sharing the same runways.

== Sport ==
The Uhrebanen is a motorcycle speedway track located approximately 5 kilometres to the south of the town. The track has hosted important events, including the Danish final as part of the qualifying rounds of the Speedway World Championship in 1992. The speedway teams Uldjyderne and later Herning, raced at the venue in the Danish Speedway League.

== Climate ==
Climate data for Air Base Karup (1971–2000 normals, extremes 1961–2000)
Month	Jan	Feb	Mar	Apr	May	Jun	Jul	Aug	Sep	Oct	Nov	Dec	Year
Record high °C (°F)	11.3 (52.3)	12.6 (54.7)	22.2 (72.0)	26.8 (80.2)	28.4 (83.1)	30.8 (87.4)	32.7 (90.9)	34.6 (94.3)	27.8 (82.0)	23.0 (73.4)	16.0 (60.8)	12.3 (54.1)	34.6 (94.3)
Mean daily maximum °C (°F)	2.9 (37.2)	3.2 (37.8)	5.9 (42.6)	10.5 (50.9)	15.9 (60.6)	18.6 (65.5)	20.7 (69.3)	20.7 (69.3)	16.4 (61.5)	12.0 (53.6)	7.0 (44.6)	4.2 (39.6)	11.5 (52.7)
Daily mean °C (°F)	0.7 (33.3)	0.8 (33.4)	2.8 (37.0)	6.2 (43.2)	11.2 (52.2)	14.0 (57.2)	16.0 (60.8)	15.8 (60.4)	12.4 (54.3)	8.7 (47.7)	4.5 (40.1)	2.0 (35.6)	7.9 (46.2)
Mean daily minimum °C (°F)	−2.0 (28.4)	−2.0 (28.4)	−0.5 (31.1)	1.8 (35.2)	6.1 (43.0)	9.3 (48.7)	11.5 (52.7)	11.0 (51.8)	8.4 (47.1)	5.2 (41.4)	1.6 (34.9)	−0.7 (30.7)	4.1 (39.4)
Record low °C (°F)	−28.4 (−19.1)	−21.0 (−5.8)	−17.9 (−0.2)	−10.4 (13.3)	−4.0 (24.8)	0.8 (33.4)	3.7 (38.7)	1.0 (33.8)	−2.3 (27.9)	−5.3 (22.5)	−18.0 (−0.4)	−24.0 (−11.2)	−28.4 (−19.1)
Average precipitation mm (inches)	67.7 (2.67)	45.9 (1.81)	55.5 (2.19)	40.8 (1.61)	48.1 (1.89)	63.3 (2.49)	59.3 (2.33)	68.7 (2.70)	84.5 (3.33)	86.7 (3.41)	81.1 (3.19)	77.0 (3.03)	778.5 (30.65)
Average precipitation days (≥ 0.1 mm)	19.1	14.9	16.7	12.3	11.9	13.0	12.9	14.0	16.0	17.6	19.3	19.9	187.7
Average snowy days	7.3	6.3	4.9	1.6	0.1	0.0	0.0	0.0	0.0	0.2	2.6	5.8	28.8
Source: DMI

Pr_prakash_32_ll
