= Viborg Municipality =

Viborg Municipality Viborg Kommune (Danish)
- Municipality
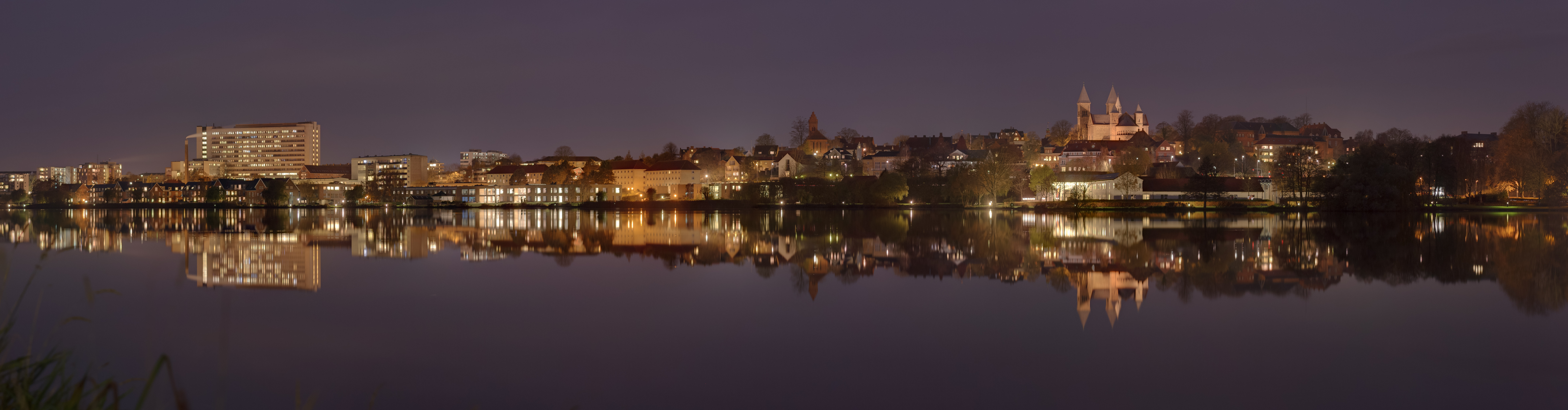

- Coat of arms

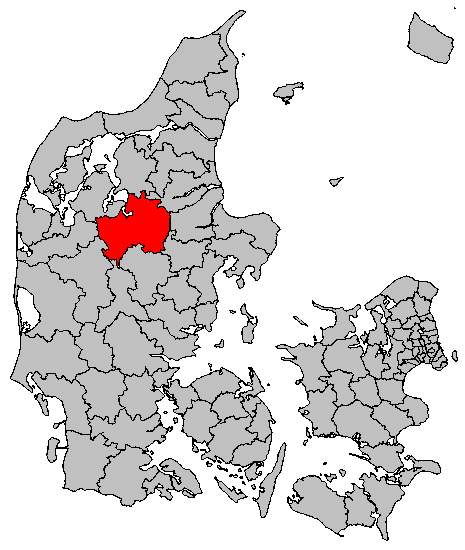
- Location in Denmark
- Coordinates: 56°27′00″N 9°22′00″E
- Country: Denmark
- Region: Central Denmark
- Established: 1 January 2007

Government
  - Mayor: Katrine Fusager Rohde (V)

Area
  - Total: 1,421.04 km^{2} (548.67 sq mi)

Population (1 January 2026)
  - Total: 97,874
  - Density: 68.875/km^{2} (178.39/sq mi)
- Time zone: UTC+1 (CET)
  - Summer (DST): UTC+2 (CEST)
- Postal code: 8800
- Website: www.viborg.dk

Viborg Municipality (Danish: Viborg Kommune) is a municipality (Danish, kommune) in Region Midtjylland on the Jutland peninsula in northern Denmark. The municipality covers an area of 1,421.04 km^{2} and has a population of 97,874 (1 January 2026). Its administrative seat and largest town is Viborg.

Viborg Municipality is the second-largest municipality in Denmark by area and forms part of Business Region Aarhus and the East Jutland metropolitan area, which had a total population of 1.378 million in 2016. It was created on 1 January 2007 as a result of the Kommunalreformen ("The Municipal Reform" of 2007), through the merger of the former municipalities of Bjerringbro, Fjends, Karup, Møldrup, and Tjele and the old Viborg Municipality.

== Locations ==
Viborg	41,000
Bjerringbro	7,400
Stoholm	2,500
Karup	2,200
Løgstrup	1,900
Frederiks	1,800
Skals	1,800
Rødkærsbro	1,700
Ørum	1,400
Møldrup	1,300

== Politics ==
=== Municipal council ===
Viborg's municipal council consists of 31 members, elected every four years.

Below are the municipal councils elected since the Municipal Reform of 2007.

Election	Party												Total seats	Turnout	Elected mayor
Election	A	B	C	D	F	I	K	O	V	Æ	Ø	Å	Total seats	Turnout	Elected mayor
2005	14	1	2		1		1	2	10				31	71.6%	Johannes Stensgaard (A)
2009	10		3		5			2	11				31	67.6%	Søren Pape Poulsen (C)
2013	9		6		1			2	12		1		31	74.3%	Torsten Nielsen (C)
2017	9		7		2			2	10		1		31	73.3%	Ulrik Wilbek (V)
2021	8		7	1	1				12		1	1	31	70.1%	Ulrik Wilbek (V)
2025	6		8		2	2		1	6	4	1	1	31	71.9%	Katrine Fusager Rohde (V)
Data from Kmdvalg.dk 2005, 2009, 2013 and 2017 and 2021. Data from valg.dk 2025

== Twin cities ==
Viborg has a twin city in each of the Nordic countries, as well as in other world regions.

Dalvík, Iceland; Greifswald, Germany; Hamar, Norway	Kecskemét, Hungary; León, Nicaragua; Lund Municipality, Sweden	Nevers, France; Porvoo, Finland; Zabrze, Poland

== See also ==
- World Map at Lake Klejtrup

== Sources ==
- Municipal statistics: NetBorger Kommunefakta, delivered from KMD a.k.a. Kommunedata (Municipal Data)
- Municipal mergers and neighbors: Eniro new municipalities map
- Searchable/printable municipal maps: Krak mapsearch(outline visible but doesn't print out!)
