= Central Denmark Region =

Region of Denmark

Mid-Jutland Midtjylland (Danish) Central Denmark Region
- Region of Denmark
- Mid-Jutland Region; Region Midtjylland (Danish)
- Flag

- Coordinates: 56°10′N 9°30′E
- Country: Denmark
- Capital: Viborg
- Largest city: Aarhus
- Municipalities: 19: Aarhus; Favrskov; Hedensted; Herning; Holstebro; Horsens; Ikast-Brande; Lemvig; Norddjurs; Odder; Randers; Ringkøbing-Skjern; Samsø; Silkeborg; Skanderborg; Skive; Struer; Syddjurs; Viborg

Government
  - Chairman: Anders Kühnau (Social Democrats)

Area
  - Total: 13,053 km^{2} (5,040 sq mi)

Population (1 January 2025)
  - Total: 1,373,799
  - Density: 105.25/km^{2} (272.59/sq mi)

GDP
  - Total: €69.727 billion (2021)
  - Per capita: €53,100 (2021)
- Time zone: UTC+1 (CET)
  - Summer (DST): UTC+2 (CEST)
- ISO 3166 code: DK-82
- HDI (2022): 0.948 very high · 2nd of 5
- Website: www.rm.dk

The Central Denmark Region (Danish: Region Midtjylland), or more directly translated as the Central Jutland Region and sometimes simply Mid-Jutland, is an administrative region of Denmark established on 1 January 2007 as part of the 2007 Danish municipal reform. The reform abolished the traditional counties (amter) and replaced them with five new administrative regions. At the same time, smaller municipalities were merged into larger units, cutting the total number of municipalities from 271 to 98. The reform diminished the power of the regional level dramatically in favour of the local level and the national government in Copenhagen. The Central Denmark Region comprises 19 municipalities.

== Toponymy ==
The Danish name of the region means "Region of Mid Jutland" and describes the location in the central part of the Jutland peninsula, in contrast to Northern Jutland and Southern Jutland (which, together with Funen and some smaller islands, forms the Region of Southern Denmark). For communication in English, the regional administration decided to use another term which is not a direct translation of the Danish name, supposing that the name Jutland might be too unknown to the English-speaking public.

A similar policy is followed by the North Denmark Region (whose Danish name, Region Nordjylland, can be translated to "Region of North Jutland").

However, the name of the region is usually untranslated when used in English-language publications that are not by the regional council itself, but by governmental authorities such as Statistics Denmark. From 2007 to 2013, five so-called State Administrations or governorates existed in Denmark, covering the five regions as separate entities from the regional councils. One of these was named the "State Administration of Central Jutland" in English and covered the same area as the regional council, but had its administration in Ringkøbing as opposed to the regional council in Viborg.

In English-language media and literature by various authors, the names Central Jutland (or Mid Jutland) are also commonly used.

== Geography ==
The municipalities composing Central Denmark Region.

The Central Denmark Region comprises most of the traditional geographical regions of Østjylland (East Jutland), Midtjylland (Central Jutland), and Vestjylland (West Jutland, identical with Hardsyssel). Smaller areas within these larger designations include the peninsula of Djursland, the hilly lake district of Søhøjlandet, Kronjylland (or Ommersyssel), Fjends, Bjerreherred, and the peninsulas of Salling and Thyholm. The region borders the North Sea in the west, the Limfjord in the northwest, and Kattegat in the east. It includes the islands of Samsø, Anholt, and the smaller Endelave, Tunø, Hjarnø and Alrø in Kattegat, as well as Venø, Jegindø and Fur in the Limfjord.

The western parts of the region are characterised by coastal dunes and inland heaths, while the slightly elevated central parts and the relatively hilly eastern parts are characterised by forests, lakes and streams, with plenty of fertile soils. The eastern parts (Østjylland) are the most densely populated area within the region and form a large part of the proposed East Jutland metropolitan area with a population of about 1.4 million.

Aarhus, with a population of 280,000, is the largest city of Jutland and the second-largest city of Denmark, as well as the hub of Eastern Jutland. Other cities with a population above 30,000 include Randers, Silkeborg, Horsens, Herning, Viborg and Holstebro. Most of these are situated in the eastern part. The administration and regional council is situated in the sixth-largest city, Viborg, which has a population of 40,000 and was the medieval capital of Jutland.

Administratively, Central Denmark Region consists of the former counties of Ringkjøbing and Aarhus (except the western half of Mariager municipality which joined Region Nordjylland), most of the former county of Viborg, and the northern half of Vejle County. The areas in question from the two latter counties were the former municipalities of Bjerringbro, Fjends, Hvorslev, Karup, Kjellerup, Møldrup, Sallingsund, Skive, Spøttrup, Sundsøre, Tjele and Viborg from Viborg County and Brædstrup, Gedved, Hedensted, Horsens, Juelsminde, Nørre-Snede and Tørring-Uldum from Vejle County.

The neighbouring administrative region to the south is the Region of Southern Denmark (Danish: Region Syddanmark), as it includes not only the southern parts of Jutland but also the island of Funen and smaller neighbouring islands. Furthermore, Sønderjylland (Southern-Jutland) is the traditional name for North Slesvig, which is the Danish part of the former Duchy of Schleswig/Slesvig.

Geologically, the region lies in the northern part of Denmark, which is rising because of post-glacial rebound.

For statistical purposes, the region has two divisions or provinces: East Jutland and West Jutland. These are almost, but not entirely, identical with the parliamentary constituencies of East Jutland and West Jutland. The western constituency is much larger in area but has a smaller population than the eastern one.

Significant local antagonism arose before the region came into effect in 2007 and in the first years of its existence. Citizens in the northwestern areas protested against the closure of the hospital of Holstebro. In the 2009 regional election, a local protest party called Fælleslisten ("The Common List"), surged to 40% of the votes in the northwestern municipalities but failed to get any seats in the 2013 election.

=== Municipalities ===
The region is subdivided into 19 municipalities:

- Aarhus
- Favrskov
- Hedensted
- Herning
- Holstebro
- Horsens
- Ikast-Brande
- Lemvig
- Norddjurs
- Odder
- Randers
- Ringkøbing-Skjern
- Samsø
- Silkeborg
- Skanderborg
- Skive
- Struer
- Syddjurs
- Viborg

== Economy ==
The gross domestic product (GDP) of the region was €62.2 billion in 2018, accounting for 20.7% of the country's economic output. The GDP per capita adjusted for purchasing power was €35,400 or 117% of the EU27 average that same year. The GDP per capita employed was 107% of the EU27 average.

== Transport ==
Aarhus Airport is the region's main airport which provides direct routes to Copenhagen and some European destinations.

== Regional Council ==
The five regions of Denmark each have a regional council of 41 members. These are elected every four years, during the local elections.

Election	Party													Total seats	Elected chairman
Election	A	B	C	D	F	I	K	O	P	V	Ø	Å	...	Total seats	Elected chairman
2005	16	2	3		2		1	2		14	1			41	Bent Hansen (A)
2009	15	1	3		6			3		11			2	41	Bent Hansen (A)
2013	16	2	2		2	1		3		13	2			41	Bent Hansen (A)
2017	15	1	1		2	1	1	3	1	13	2	1		41	Anders Kühnau (A)
2021	13	2	6	1	3		1	1	1	11	2			41	Anders Kühnau (A)
Current	13	2	6		3		1	2	1	11	2			41	Anders Kühnau (A)
Data from Kmdvalg.dk

== See also ==
- Regions of Denmark
