= Rødkærsbro =

- Town
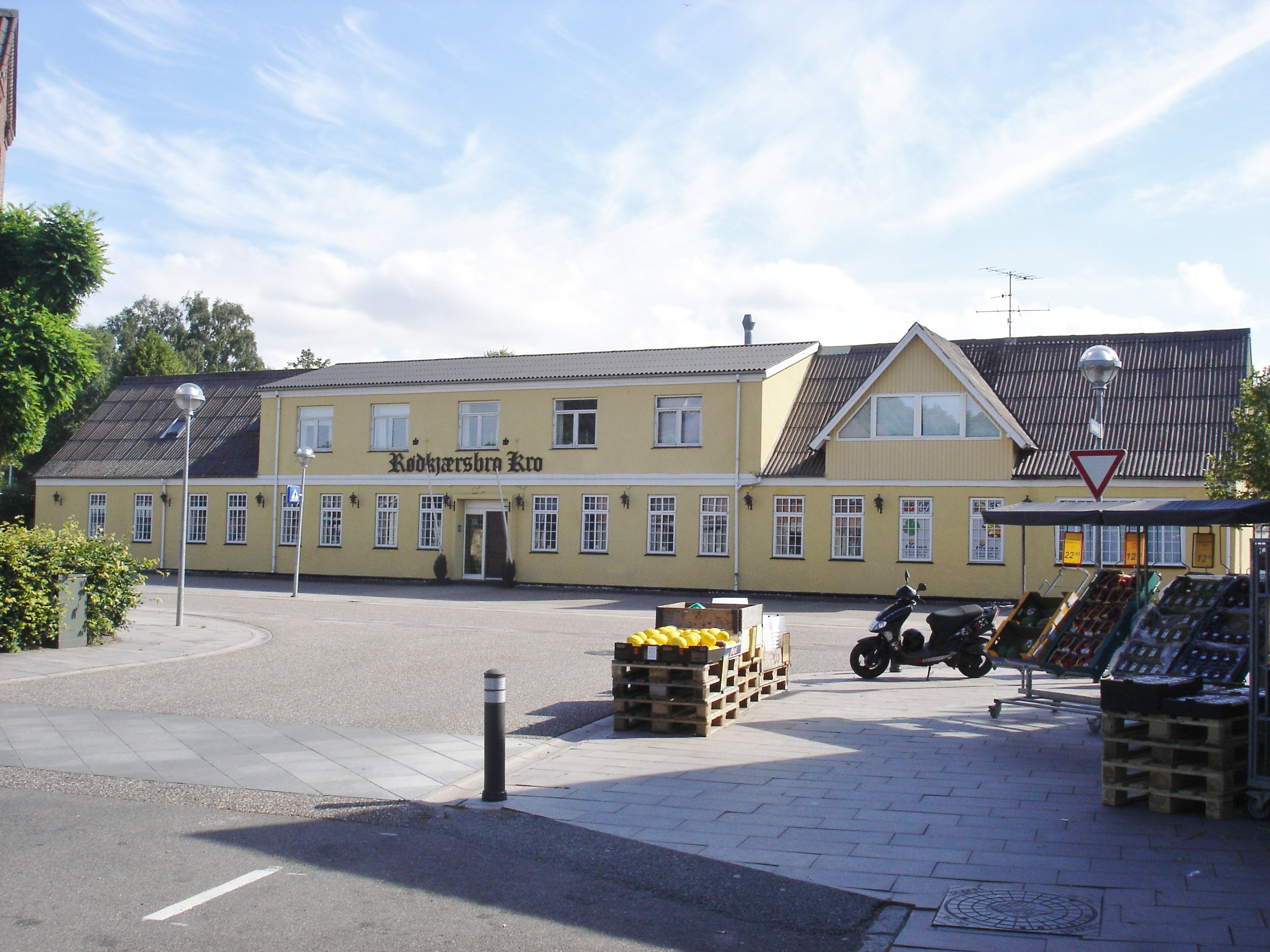

- Location in Central Denmark Region Rødkærsbro (Denmark)
- Coordinates: 56°21′8″N 9°30′12″E
- Country: Denmark
- Region: Central Denmark Region
- Municipality: Viborg Municipality

Area
  - Urban: 1.9 km^{2} (0.73 sq mi)

Population (2026)
  - Urban: 1,760
  - Urban density: 930/km^{2} (2,400/sq mi)
- Time zone: UTC+1 (CET)
  - Summer (DST): UTC+2 (CEST)
- Postal code: DK-8840 Rødkærsbro

Rødkærsbro is a railway town in Viborg Municipality in central Jutland, Denmark. It is located 10 km (6.2 mi) west of Bjerringbro, 8 km (5.0 mi) northwest of Ans, 26 km (16 mi) north of Silkeborg, 10 km (6.2 mi) northeast of Kjellerup and 16 km (9.9 mi) southeast of Viborg. As of 1 January 2026, Rødkærsbro has a population of 1,760.

== History ==
=== Parishes and churches ===
The oldest part of Rødkærsbro - north of Vindelsbæk - belongs to Vindum Parish, which was the largest parish in Middelsom Herred, because it also includes the former Faldborg Parish, where the church was demolished in 1655. Just west of the town, on the south side of the old main road is a memorial to the demolished Faldborg Church.

=== Railway ===
Jutland's second oldest railway line, the Langå–Struer line, was inaugurated on 21 July 1863 and had a station here which was called Rødkærsbro, because south of the station there was a bridge over a low-lying lake, which was called Rødkær because it was surrounded by a reddish vegetation. In 1875 the conditions are described as follows: "Rødkjærsbro with railway station and inn". Around the turn of the last century, the town was referred to as: "Rødkjærsbro, Gde. and Huse, with inn, railway, telegraph and telephone exchange as well as postal forwarding."

== Facilities ==
Rødkærsbro School has 321 students, divided into grades 0–9. grade level. The school employs 13 teachers. Rødkærsbro Sports Association (RIF) offers badminton, football, gymnastics, handball, running, swimming and tennis as well as training in the gym.

== Economy ==
Rødkjærsbro Kro was built in 1864 as one of the first buildings at the station and is still the town's oldest business.
