= Stoholm railway station =

Railway station in Jutland, Denmark

Stoholm
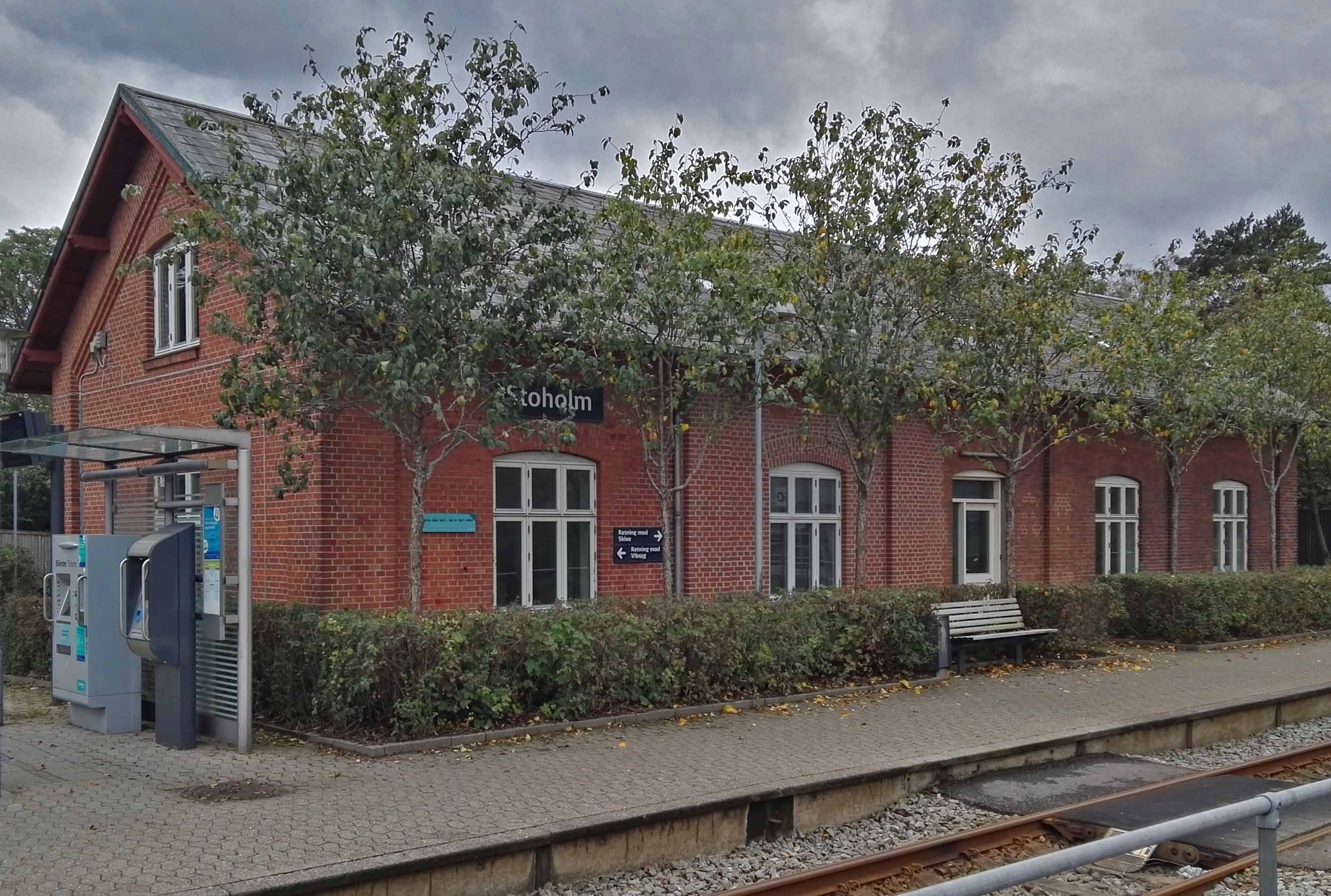
- Stoholm station in 2019

General information
- Location: Stationsvej 2A; 7850 Stoholm; Viborg Municipality; Denmark
- Coordinates: 56°29′14″N 9°9′0″E
- Elevation: 15.2 metres (50 ft)
- Owner: DSB (station infrastructure); Banedanmark (rail infrastructure)
- Line: Langå–Struer
- Platforms: 2
- Tracks: 2
- Train operators: DSB

History
- Opened: 17 October 1864

Services
Preceding station	DSB Vores Tog	Following station
Sparkær towards Århus H	Aarhus–Struer Regional train	Højslev towards Struer
Location
- Location within Denmark Location within Central Denmark Region

Stoholm station is a railway station serving the railway town of Stoholm in Jutland, Denmark.

Stoholm station is located on the Langå–Struer railway line from Langå to Struer. The station was opened in 1864 with the opening of the Viborg–Skive section of the Langå–Struer Line. It offers frequent direct regional train services to Aarhus and Struer operated by the national railway company DSB.

== History ==
Stoholm station opened on 17 October 1864 with the opening of the Viborg–Skive section of the Langå–Struer railway line. In 1865, the line was continued from Skive to Struer. In 1973 the station was closed but continues as a railway halt.

== See also ==
- List of railway stations in Denmark
- Rail transport in Denmark
- History of rail transport in Denmark
- Transport in Denmark
