= Ans, Denmark =

Ans
- Town
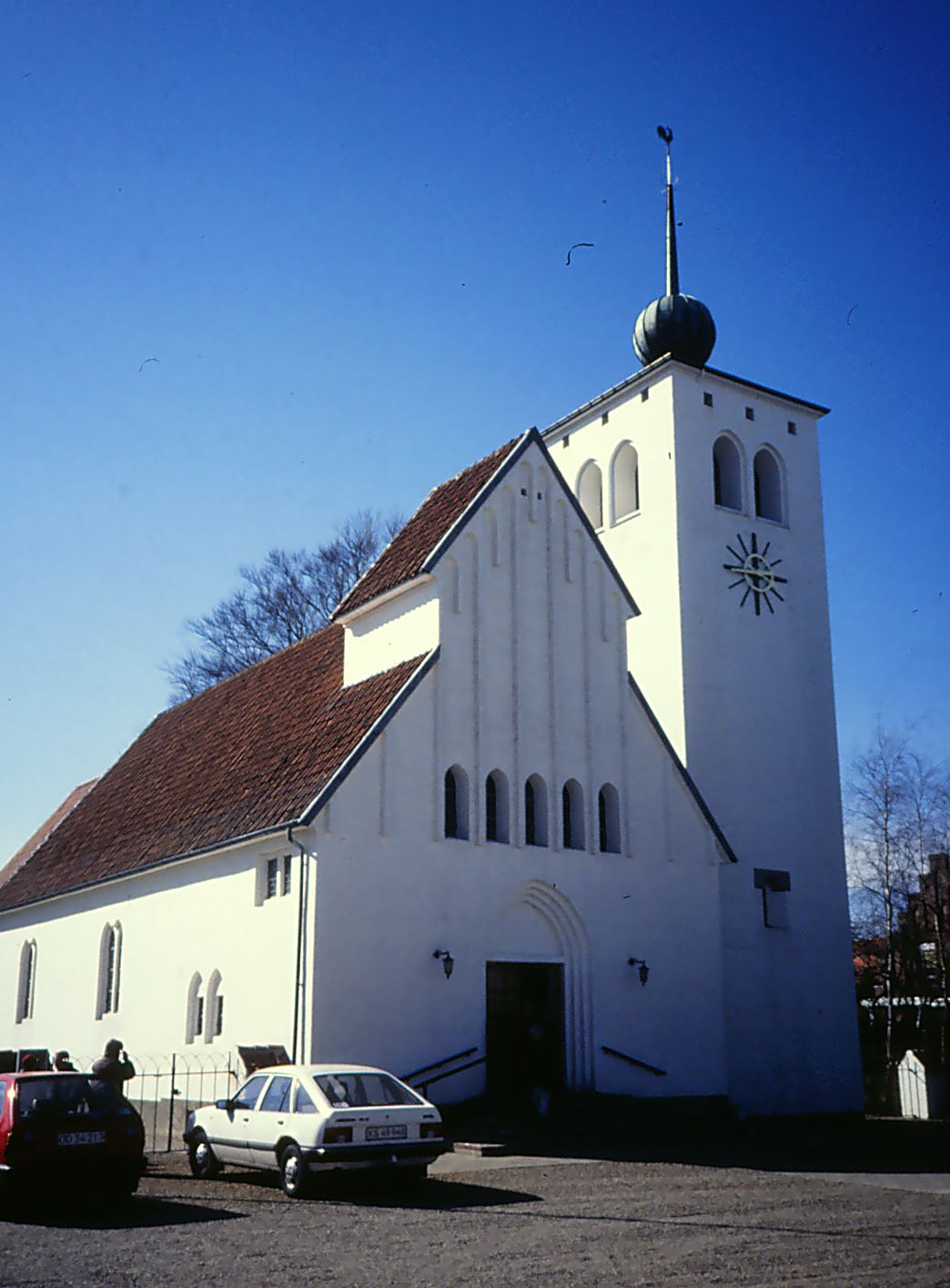
- Ans Church

- Location within Denmark
- Coordinates: 56°18′40″N 9°35′11″E
- Country: Denmark
- Region: Central Denmark (Midtjylland)
- Municipality: Silkeborg

Area
  - Urban: 1.3 km^{2} (0.50 sq mi)

Population (2026)
  - Urban: 1,927
  - Urban density: 1,500/km^{2} (3,800/sq mi)
- Time zone: UTC+1 (Central European Time)
  - Summer (DST): UTC+2 (Central European Summer Time)
- Postal code: DK-8643 Ans By

Ans is a town in Silkeborg Municipality, Central Denmark Region in Denmark. It is situated at the southern shore of Tange Sø (Tange Lake), 8 km southeast of Rødkærsbro, 10 km southwest of Bjerringbro, 17 km north of Silkeborg and 21 km southeast of Viborg.

Ans Church, built in 1935 as a mission house, is located in the town.
