= Søren Pape Poulsen =

Danish politician (1971–2024)

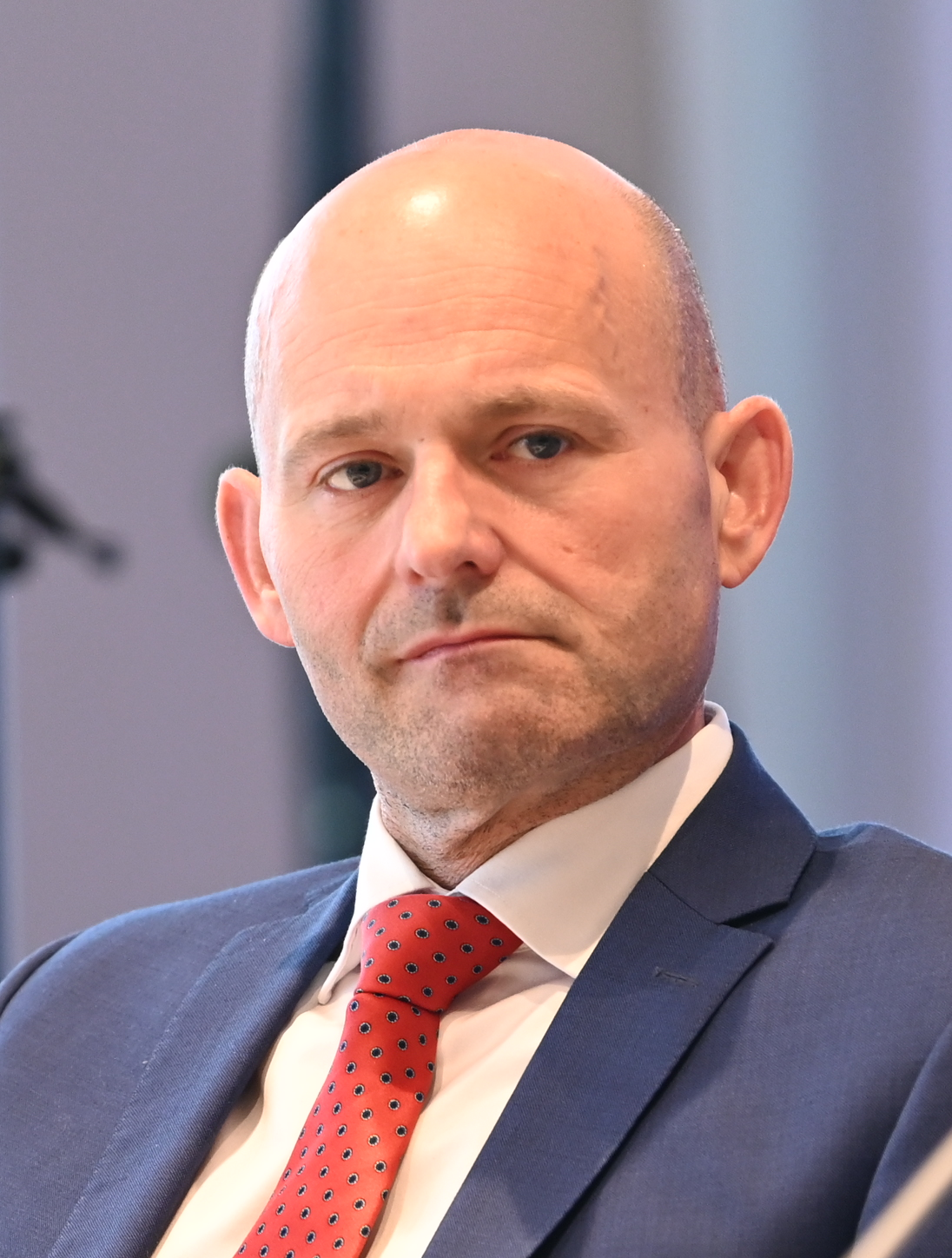
- Pape Poulsen in 2023

Minister of Justice
- In office 28 November 2016 – 27 June 2019
- Prime Minister: Lars Løkke Rasmussen
- Preceded by: Søren Pind
- Succeeded by: Nick Hækkerup

Leader of the Conservative People's Party
- In office 7 August 2014 – 2 March 2024
- Preceded by: Lars Barfoed
- Succeeded by: Mona Juul

Mayor of Viborg Municipality
- In office 1 January 2010 – 3 September 2014
- Preceded by: Johannes Stensgaard
- Succeeded by: Torsten Nielsen

Member of the Folketing
- In office 18 June 2015 – 2 March 2024
- Succeeded by: Dina Raabjerg
- Constituency: West Jutland

Personal details
- Born: 31 December 1971 Copenhagen, Denmark
- Died: 2 March 2024 (aged 52) Odense, Denmark
- Party: Conservative People's Party
- Spouse: Josué Medina Vásquez (m. 2021; div. 2022)

Søren Pape Poulsen (31 December 1971 – 2 March 2024) was a Danish politician who served as a member of the Folketing for the Danish Conservative Party and its leader from 2014 until his death. He was previously Mayor of Viborg Municipality from 2010 to 2014 and Justice Minister of Denmark from 2016 to 2019.

== Political career ==
Pape Poulsen was elected to the municipal council in Bjerringbro Municipality in 2001. Following the Danish Municipal Reform in 2007, Bjerringbro Municipality became part of the new Viborg Municipality and he continued his work in the new municipal council. Following the local elections of 2009, he formed a majority with the Social Democrats, the Socialist People's Party and the Danish People's Party and became mayor in Viborg. At the 2013 election, the Conservatives doubled their representation on the council and Pape Poulsen was reelected as mayor.

On 6 August 2014, Lars Barfoed stepped down as leader of the Conservative People's Party and said that he would like Pape Poulsen to succeed him as leader. The following day, the parliamentary group unanimously elected him as political leader until the party congress on 26 September 2014. He was mayor until Wednesday, 3 September 2014 when Torsten Nielsen from the Conservative People's Party became mayor.

On 18 June 2015, Pape Poulsen became a member of the Folketing for West Jutland.

On 28 November 2016, Pape Poulsen became Minister of Justice in Prime Minister Lars Løkke Rasmussen's third cabinet. He was minister until 25 June 2019.

On 15 August 2022, Pape Poulsen, with the Conservatives at some of their highest polling in years, declared he was going into the 2022 election as a candidate for the prime minister position. Polling two months before the election suggested that Pape Poulsen was the clear favorite between him and fellow right wing candidate Jakob Ellemann-Jensen, but as the election neared Pape Poulsen became increasingly less popular, and ended up losing two seats in the election held on 1 November 2022.

== Personal life ==
Pape Poulsen was educated in shipping at Grundfos.

On 10 August 2014, Pape Poulsen came out as gay, simultaneously announcing his relationship with Josué Medina Vásquez, originally from the Dominican Republic. They were engaged in 2017, later marrying in 2021. On 14 September 2022, he announced that they were divorcing, following suggestions that Medina had given him false information about his background. Following this scandal his party's popularity fell several-fold just before the election, almost totally in favor of the Moderates.

=== Death ===
Pape Poulsen died from a cerebral haemorrhage on 2 March 2024, at the age of 52. He had collapsed the day before during a meeting of the party's executive committee in Vejen, and died after being taken to Odense University Hospital. Conservative People's Party general secretary Søren Vandsø, who has been described as Pape Poulsen's "faithful squire" (Danish: tro væbner), took part in the meeting and later was by Pape Poulsen's side when he died. In a statement on the party's website, announcing the death to the public, Vandsø paid tribute to Pape Poulsen:

He collapsed in the midst of what he dedicated his life to. A political life that sought to make life better for the rest of us. He was orienting us about elderly policy and foreign policy considerations, and the last thing he experienced was a great applause from his party colleagues.

Condolences poured in from across the political spectrum, including Kristian Thulesen Dahl, Pelle Dragsted, Mette Frederiksen, Ulf Kristersson, Roberta Metsola, Troels Lund Poulsen, Anders Fogh Rasmussen, Lars Løkke Rasmussen, Erna Solberg, Helle Thorning-Schmidt and Ulrik Wilbek. Flowers and lights were placed on the stairs in front of Pape Poulsen's home in Viborg. A ceremony officiated by Henrik Stubkjær, the Bishop of Viborg, took place at Viborg Cathedral on 9 March 2024. His ashes were interred at Bjerringbro Church. Question time on 12 March was cancelled at the request of the Conservatives, and replaced with a memorial service in the Folketing.

Michael Ziegler, mayor of Høje-Taastrup Municipality and deputy chairman of the Conservative People's Party, became temporary chairman until a successor can be elected. On 13 March, Mona Juul, MF since the 2019 election, was unanimously elected as political leader (Danish: politisk leder) of the party by the parliamentary group. The party's executive committee also unanimously endorsed Juul for the post of party chairman (Danish: partiformand), subject to a vote of the party membership at an extraordinary party conference later in the year. Pape had held both posts from 2014 until his death.

Political offices
Preceded by Søren Pind	Minister of Justice; 2016–2019	Succeeded by Nick Hækkerup
Party political offices
Preceded by Lars Barfoed	Leader of the Conservative People's Party; 2014–2024	Succeeded by Mona Juul
