= Sparkær =

- Railway town
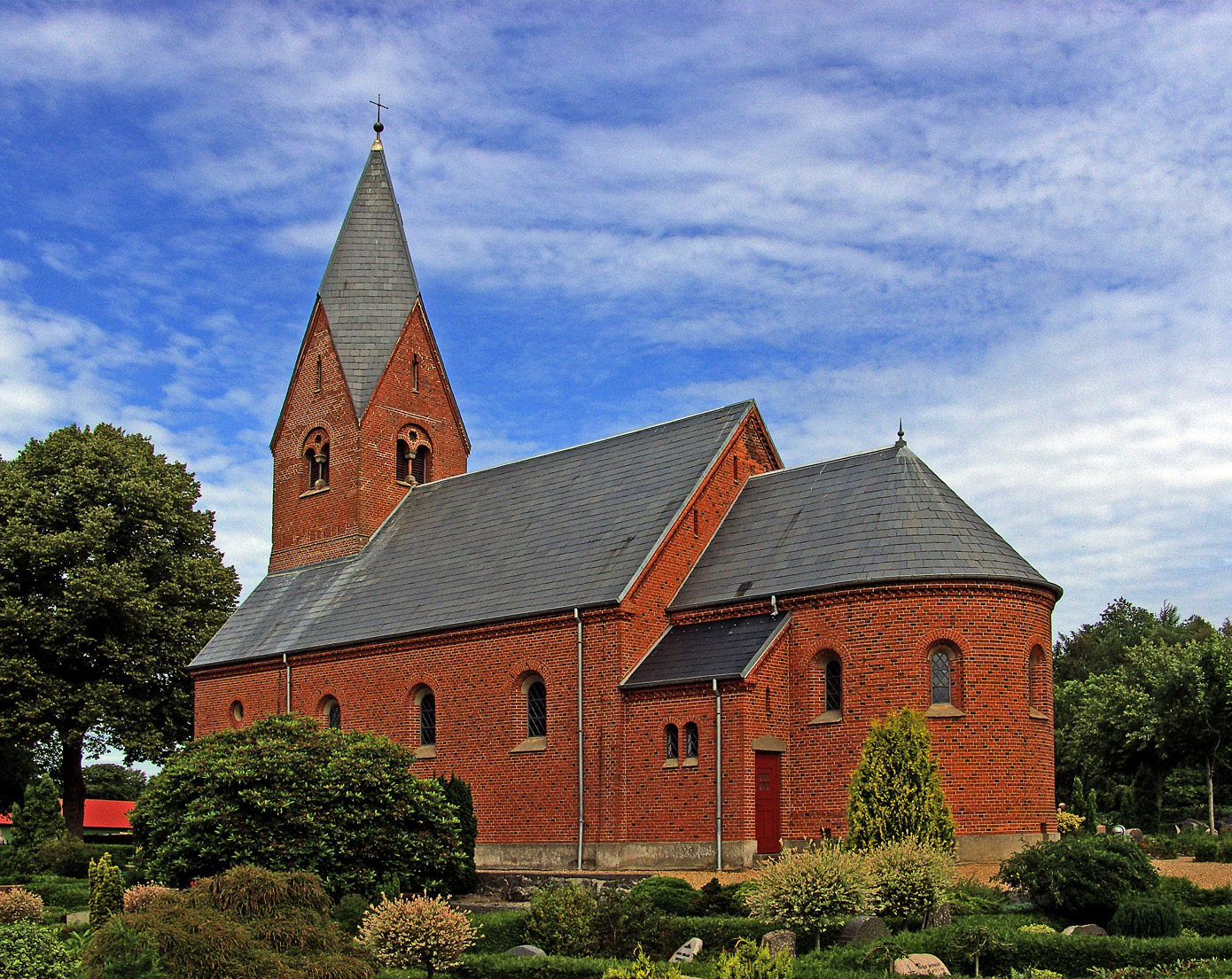
- Sparkær Church

- Location in Central Denmark Region Sparkær (Denmark)
- Coordinates: 56°28′43″N 9°13′45″E
- Country: Denmark
- Region: Central Denmark Region
- Municipality: Viborg Municipality

Population (2026)
  - Total: 624

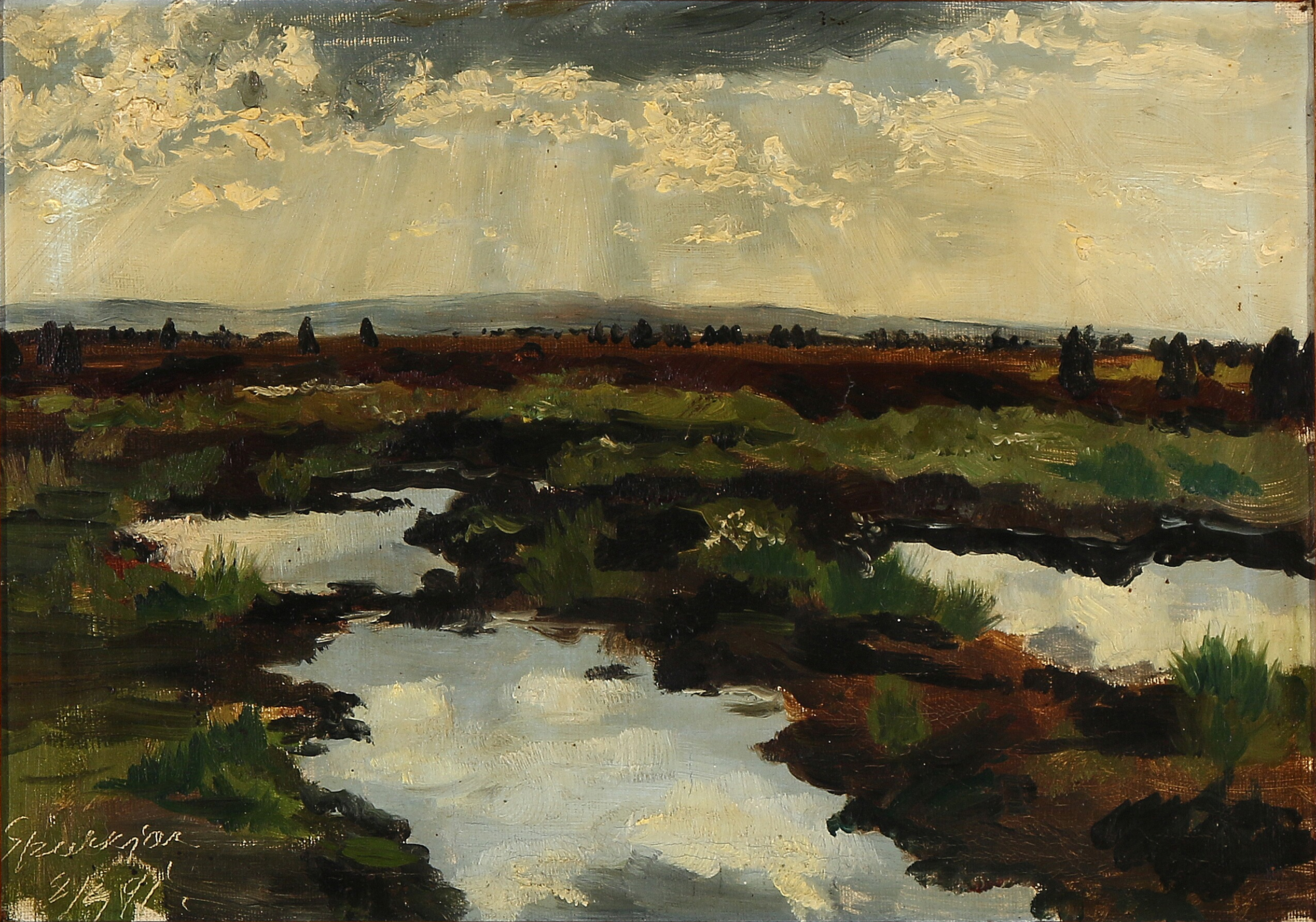
Heath landscape near Sparkær, Jutland. Painting by Gotfred Rode, 1891.

Sparkær is a small railway town in Viborg Municipality in central Jutland, Denmark. It is located 15 kilometres (9.3 mi) west of Viborg. As of 1 January 2026, Sparkær has a population of 624. Sparkær is located at the Langå-Struer railway line and is served by Sparkær railway station.
