= Sparkær railway station =

Railway station in Jutland, Denmark

Sparkær

General information
- Location: Sparkær Mosevej 3 Sparkær, 8800 Viborg; Viborg Municipality; Denmark
- Coordinates: 56°28′31″N 09°13′40″E
- Elevation: 20.3 metres (67 ft)
- Owner: Banedanmark
- Line: Langå–Struer
- Platforms: 1
- Tracks: 1
- Train operators: DSB

History
- Opened: 17 October 1865; 11 December 2022
- Closed: 27 May 1979

Services
Preceding station	DSB Vores Tog	Following station
Viborg towards Århus H	Aarhus–Struer Regional train	Stoholm towards Struer
Location

Sparkær railway station is a railway station serving the small railway town of Sparkær in Jutland, Denmark.

The station is located on the Langå–Struer railway line from Langå to Struer. It opened in 1865, closed in 1979, but reopened in 2022. It offers direct regional train services to Aarhus and Struer. The train services at the station are operated by the national railway company DSB.

== History ==
Sparkær station opened on 17 October 1865 with the opening of the Viborg–Skive section of the Langå–Struer railway line. On 27 May 1979 the station was closed, but the station reopened on 11 December 2022.

== Operations ==
The train services are operated by the national railway company DSB. The station offers direct regional train services to Aarhus and Struer.

== See also ==
- List of railway stations in Denmark
