= Ulstrup railway station =

Railway station in Jutland, Denmark

Ulstrup
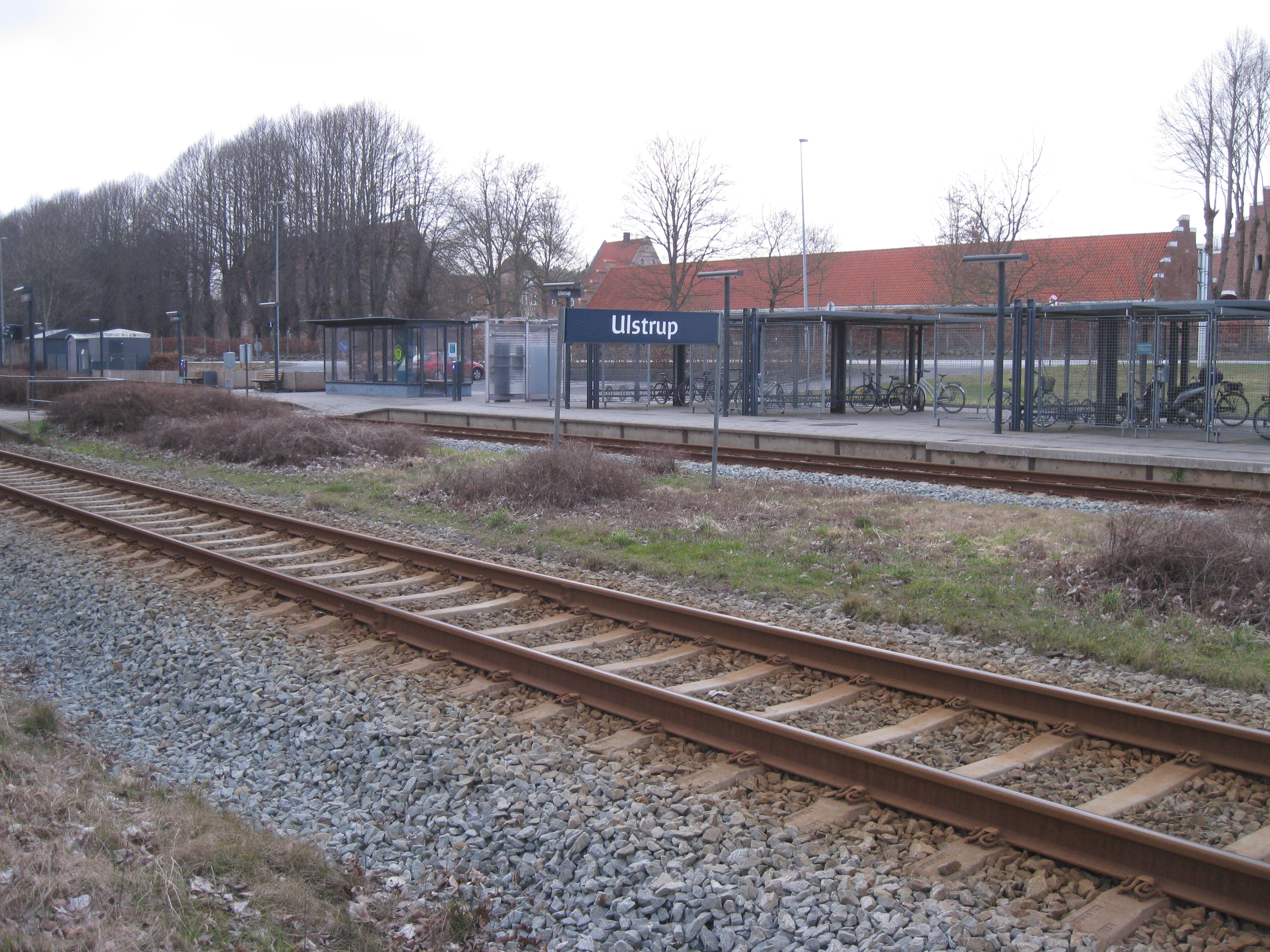
- Ulstrup station in 2015

General information
- Location: Slotsvej 1; 8860 Ulstrup; Favrskov Municipality; Denmark
- Coordinates: 56°23′44″N 9°47′34″E
- Elevation: 6.1 metres (20 ft)
- Owner: Banedanmark
- Line: Langå–Struer
- Platforms: 2
- Tracks: 2
- Train operators: DSB

History
- Opened: 20 July 1863

Services
Preceding station	DSB Vores Tog	Following station
Langå towards Århus H	Aarhus–Struer Regional train	Bjerringbro towards Struer
Location

Ulstrup station is a railway station serving the railway town of Ulstrup in Jutland, Denmark.

Ulstrup station is located on the Langå–Struer railway line from Langå to Struer. The station was opened in 1863 with the opening of the Langå–Viborg section of the Langå–Struer Line. It offers direct regional train services to Aarhus and Struer. The train services at the station are operated by the national train operating company DSB.

== History ==
Ulstrup station opened on 20 July 1863 with the opening of the Langå–Viborg section of the Langå–Struer railway line. In 1864, the railway line was continued from Viborg to Skive and in 1865 to Struer. In 1974 the station was closed but continues as a railway halt. The station building has since been torn down.

== See also ==
- List of railway stations in Denmark
- Rail transport in Denmark
- Transport in Denmark
