= Rødkærsbro railway station =

Railway station in Jutland, Denmark

Rødkærsbro
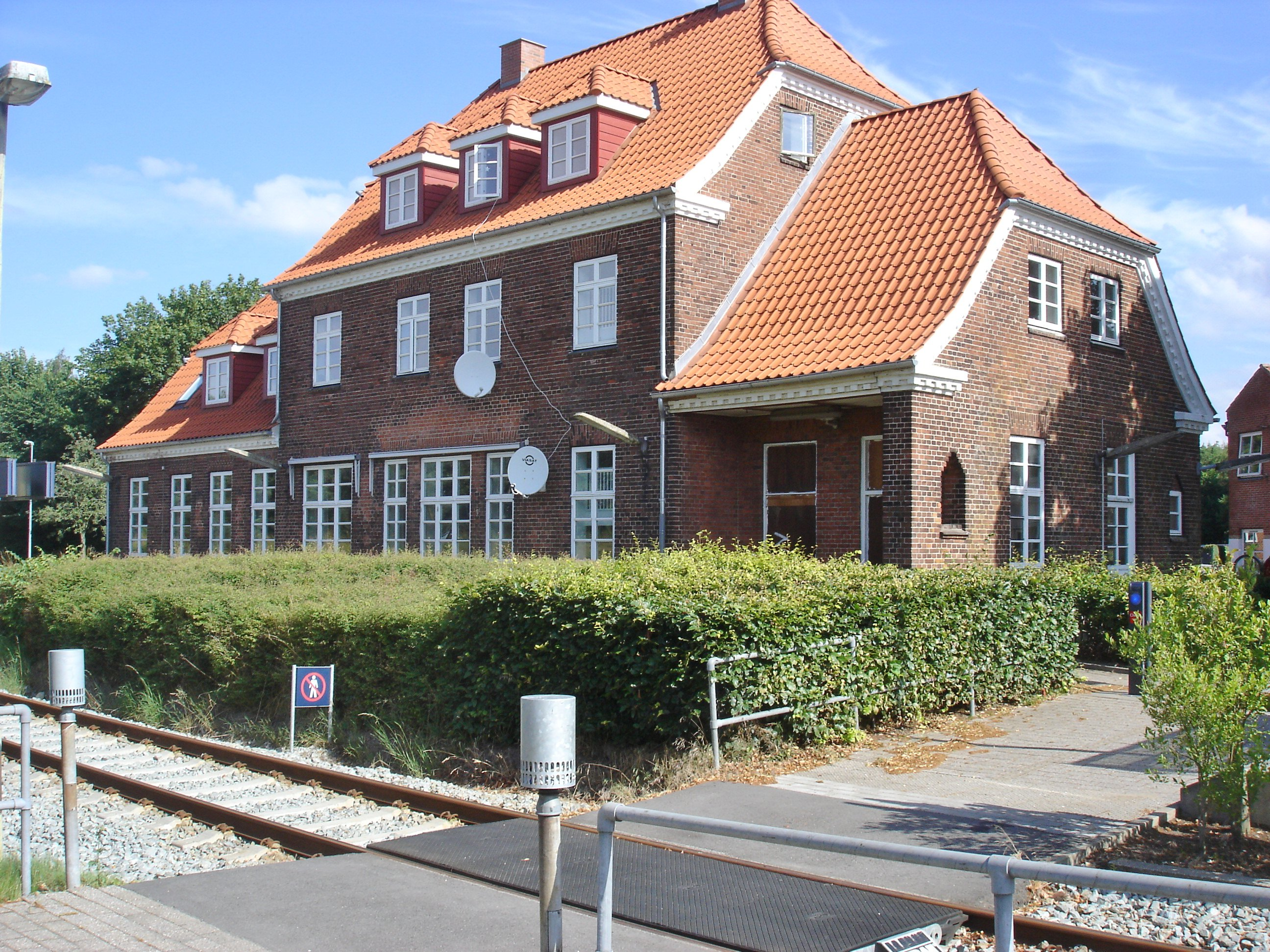
- Rødkærsbro station in 2014

General information
- Location: Jernbanegade 7; 8840 Rødkærsbro; Viborg Municipality; Denmark
- Coordinates: 56°21′12″N 9°29′56″E
- Elevation: 31.3 metres (103 ft)
- System: railway station
- Owner: DSB (station infrastructure); Banedanmark (rail infrastructure)
- Lines: Langå–Struer; Kjellerup Line (closed 1968)
- Platforms: 2
- Tracks: 2
- Train operators: DSB

History
- Opened: 20 July 1863

Services
Preceding station	DSB Vores Tog	Following station
Bjerringbro towards Århus H	Aarhus–Struer Regional train	Viborg towards Struer
Location
- Location within Denmark Location within Central Denmark Region

Rødkærsbro station is a railway station serving the railway town of Rødkærsbro in Jutland, Denmark.

Rødkærsbro station is on the Langå–Struer railway line from Langå to Struer. The station was opened in 1863 with the opening of the Langå–Viborg section of the Langå–Struer line. It offers direct regional train services to Aarhus and Struer. The train services are operated by the national train operating company DSB.

== History ==
Rødkærsbro station opened on 20 July 1863 with the opening of the Langå–Viborg section of the Langå–Struer railway line. In 1864, the railway line was continued from Viborg to Skive and in 1865 to Struer. In 1912, Rødkærsbro station also became the northern terminus of the new Kjellerup railway line from Rødkærsbro to Kjellerup, which was prolonged to Silkeborg in 1924.

The Kjellerup Line was closed in 1968, and in 1974 Rødkærsbro station was closed but continues as a railway halt.

== Architecture ==
The current station building was built in 1911 before the opening of the Kjellerup line in 1912.

== See also ==
- List of railway stations in Denmark
- Rail transport in Denmark
- History of rail transport in Denmark
- Transport in Denmark
