= Bjerringbro railway station =

Railway station in Jutland, Denmark

Bjerringbro
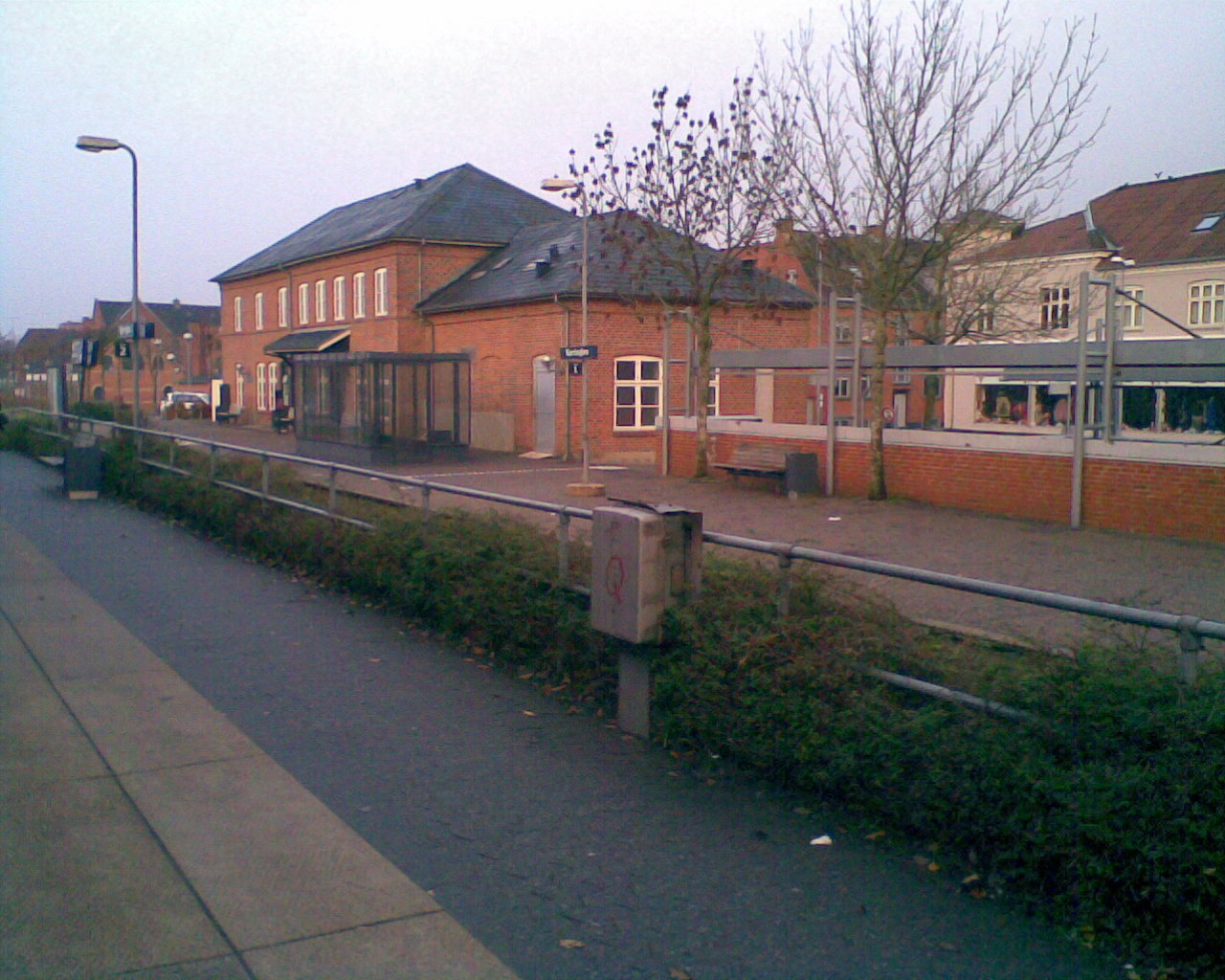
- Bjerringbro station in 2008

General information
- Location: Storegade 4; 8850 Bjerringbro; Viborg Municipality; Denmark
- Coordinates: 56°22′27.41″N 9°39′26.37″E
- Elevation: 7.7 metres (25 ft)
- Owner: DSB (station infrastructure); Banedanmark (rail infrastructure)
- Line: Langå–Struer
- Platforms: 2
- Tracks: 2
- Train operators: DSB

Other information
- Website: Official website

History
- Opened: 20 July 1863

Services
Preceding station	DSB Vores Tog	Following station
Ulstrup towards Århus H	Aarhus–Struer Regional train	Rødkærsbro towards Struer
Location

Bjerringbro station is a railway station serving the railway town of Bjerringbro in Jutland, Denmark.

Bjerringbro station is located on the Langå–Struer railway line between Langå and Struer. The station was opened in 1863 with the opening of the Langå–Viborg section of the Langå–Struer line. It offers direct regional train services to Aarhus and Struer. Since 2026, the train services have been operated by the national train operating company DSB.

== History ==
Bjerringbro station opened on 20 July 1863 with the opening of the Langå–Viborg section of the Langå–Struer railway line. In 1864, the railway line was continued from Viborg to Skive and in 1865 to Struer.

== See also ==
- List of railway stations in Denmark
