= Viborg railway station =

Railway station in Jutland, Denmark

Viborg
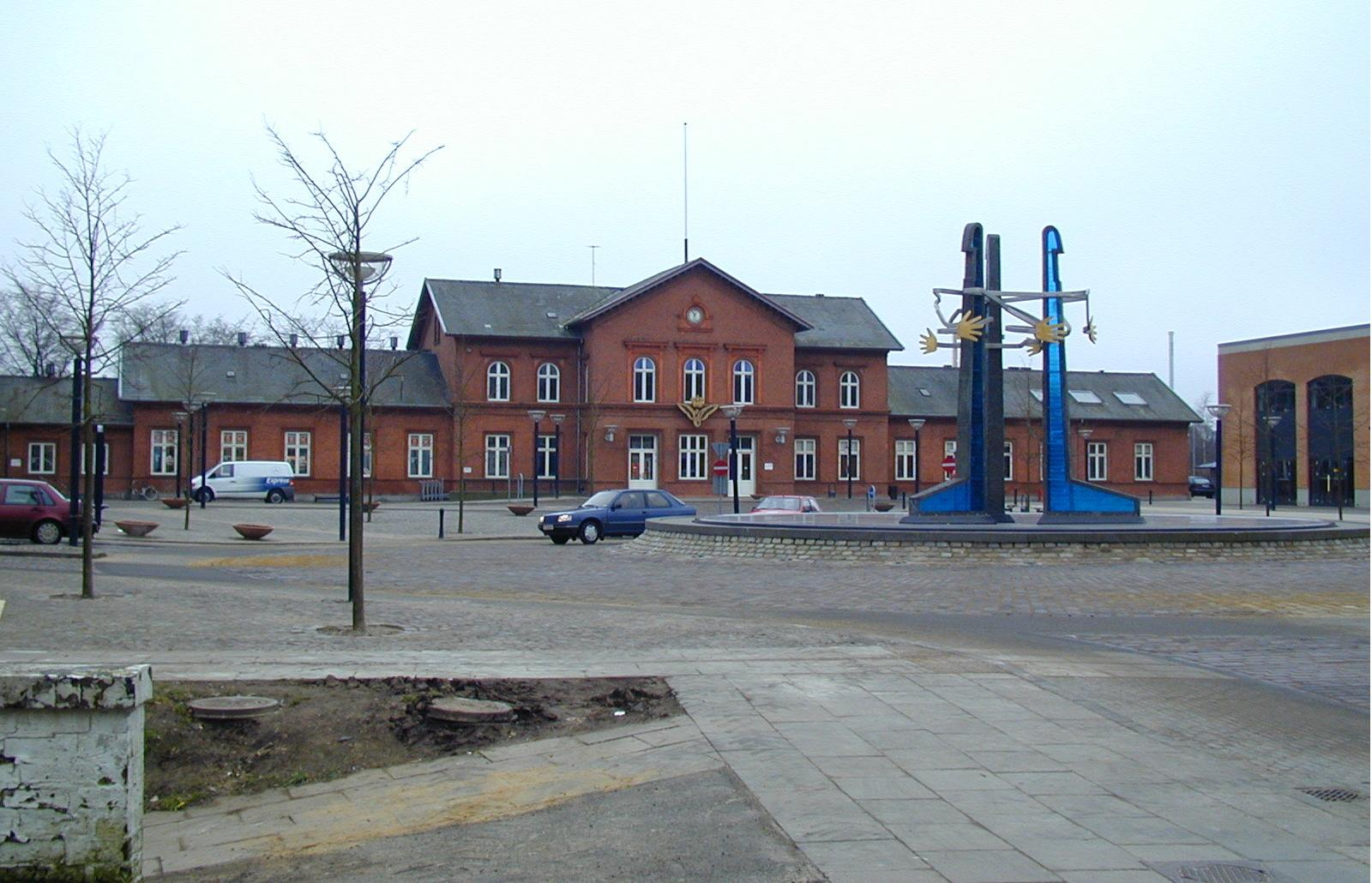
- Viborg station

General information
- Location: Banegårspladsen 2; 8800 Viborg; Viborg Municipality; Denmark
- Coordinates: 56°26′51″N 9°23′55″E
- Elevation: 31.2 metres (102 ft)
- Owner: DSB (station infrastructure); Banedanmark (rail infrastructure)
- Lines: Langå–Struer; Viborg–Aalestrup(–Løgstør) (closed 2006); Viborg–Herning (closed 1972); Viborg–Fårup–Mariager (closed 1966)
- Platforms: 2
- Tracks: 2
- Train operators: DSB

History
- Opened: 20 July 1863
- Rebuilt: 1896

Services
Preceding station	DSB Vores Tog	Following station
Rødkærsbro towards Århus H	Aarhus–Struer Regional train	Sparkær towards Struer
Location

Viborg station (Danish: Viborg Station or Viborg Banegård) is a railway station serving the city of Viborg in Jutland, Denmark.

Viborg station is located on the Langå–Struer railway line from Langå to Struer. The station was opened in 1863 with the opening of the Langå–Viborg section of the Langå–Struer Line. It was moved to its current location in 1896. It offers direct regional train services to Aarhus and Struer. The train services are operated by the national train operating company DSB.

== History ==
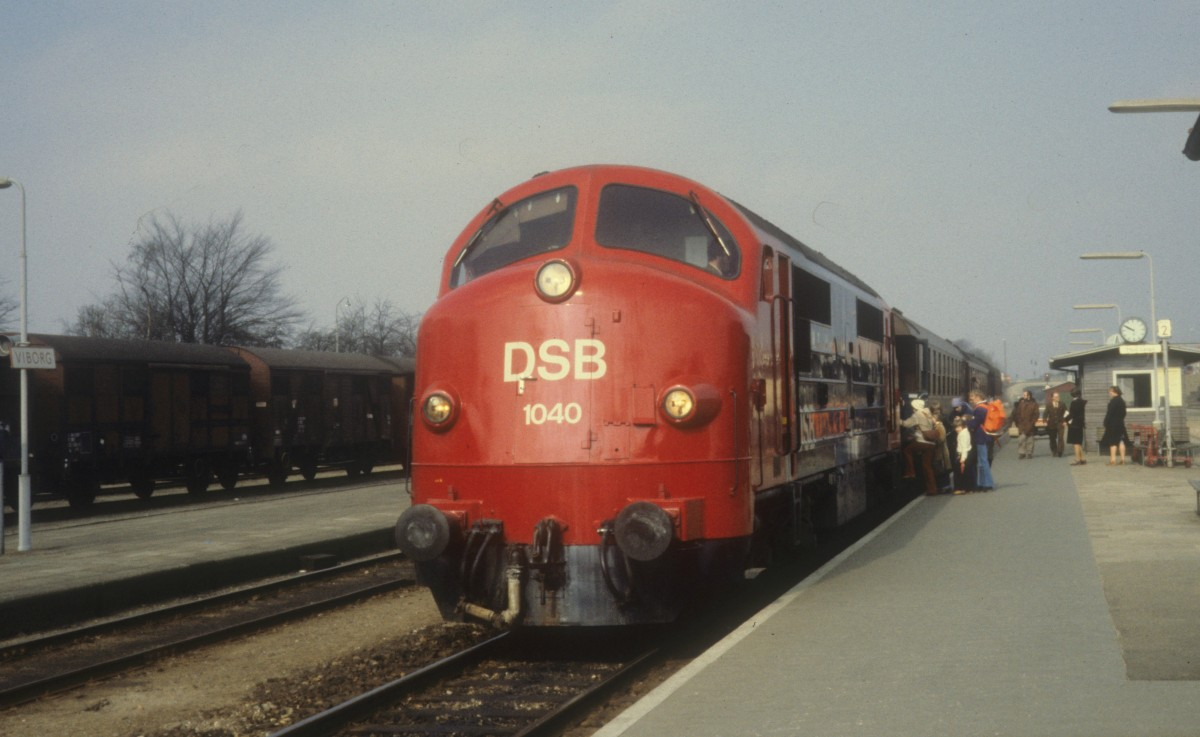
DSB train on the Langå–Struer railway line calling at Viborg in 1979.

The station opened in 1863 to serve as terminus of the new railway line from Langå to Viborg. In 1864, the railway line was continued to Skive and in 1865 to Struer. In 1893, Viborg station also became the southern terminus of the new Viborg–Aalestrup railway line, which connected with the Hobro–Aalestrup–Løgstør Line a month later.

The original Viborg station was a terminal station, and trains arriving there had to end their journeys (terminate) or reverse out of the station. In 1896, however, the station was moved to its present location and the current station building was built.

In 1906, the Herning–Viborg railway line opened, followed by the Viborg–Faarup–Mariager Line in 1927. The Mariager Line was closed in 1965 and the Herning Line in 1971, while passenger traffic on the Viborg–Aalestrup line stopped in 1966, with freight service on the line between Viborg and Løgstør continuing until 1999.

== Operations ==
=== Train services ===
The train services are currently operated by the national train operating company DSB which run frequent regional train services from Viborg station to Struer and Aarhus Central Station.

== See also ==
- List of railway stations in Denmark
- Rail transport in Denmark
