= Torsten Nielsen =

Danish politician

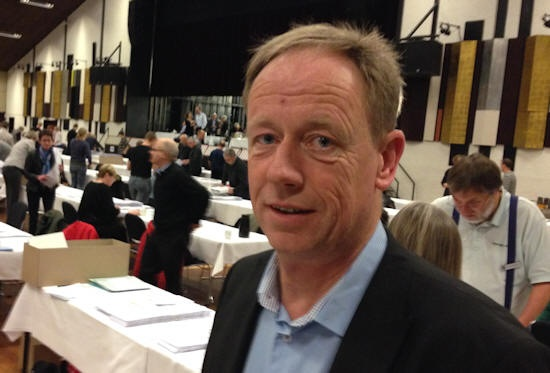
- Nielsen in 2013

Mayor of Viborg Municipality
- In office 3 September 2014 – 31 December 2017
- Preceded by: Søren Pape Poulsen
- Succeeded by: Ulrik Wilbek

Personal details
- Born: 5 March 1967 (age 59) Sparkær, Denmark
- Party: Conservative People's Party

Torsten Nielsen (born 5 March 1967) is a Danish politician and former real estate agent. He was mayor of Viborg Municipality for the Conservative People's Party from 3 September 2014 to 31 December 2017. Nielsen worked as a licensed real estate agent between 1992 and 2021, and he was elected to the Viborg Municipality city council in 2009, where he was re-elected in 2013. Nielsen succeeded the former mayor, Søren Pape Poulsen, when he was appointed as the new leader of the Conservative People's Party in 2017.

== Civil career ==
Nielsen is a licensed real estate agent and started running his own business in 1992, first in his hometown Sparkjær, before moving to Stoholm in 2012. In 2021, he sold his real estate agency to focus full-time on his job in the Viborg city council.

== Political career ==
Nielsen ventured into local politics during discussions surrounding school closures. He was first elected to the Viborg City Council in 2009 and subsequently re-elected in both 2013 and 2017. Following the 2013 election, he assumed the role of chairman of the Municipality's Climate and Environment Committee. On 3 September 2014, he took over as mayor following the departure of Søren Pape Poulsen, who became the new leader of the Conservative People's Party, while Social Democrat Flemming Lund assumed Nielsen's former position as chairman of the Climate and Environment Committee. However, Nielsen faced defeat by fellow Venstre candidate Ulrik Wilbek in the contest for the mayor's position in Viborg during the 2017 Danish local elections.
