= Dina Raabjerg =

Danish politician

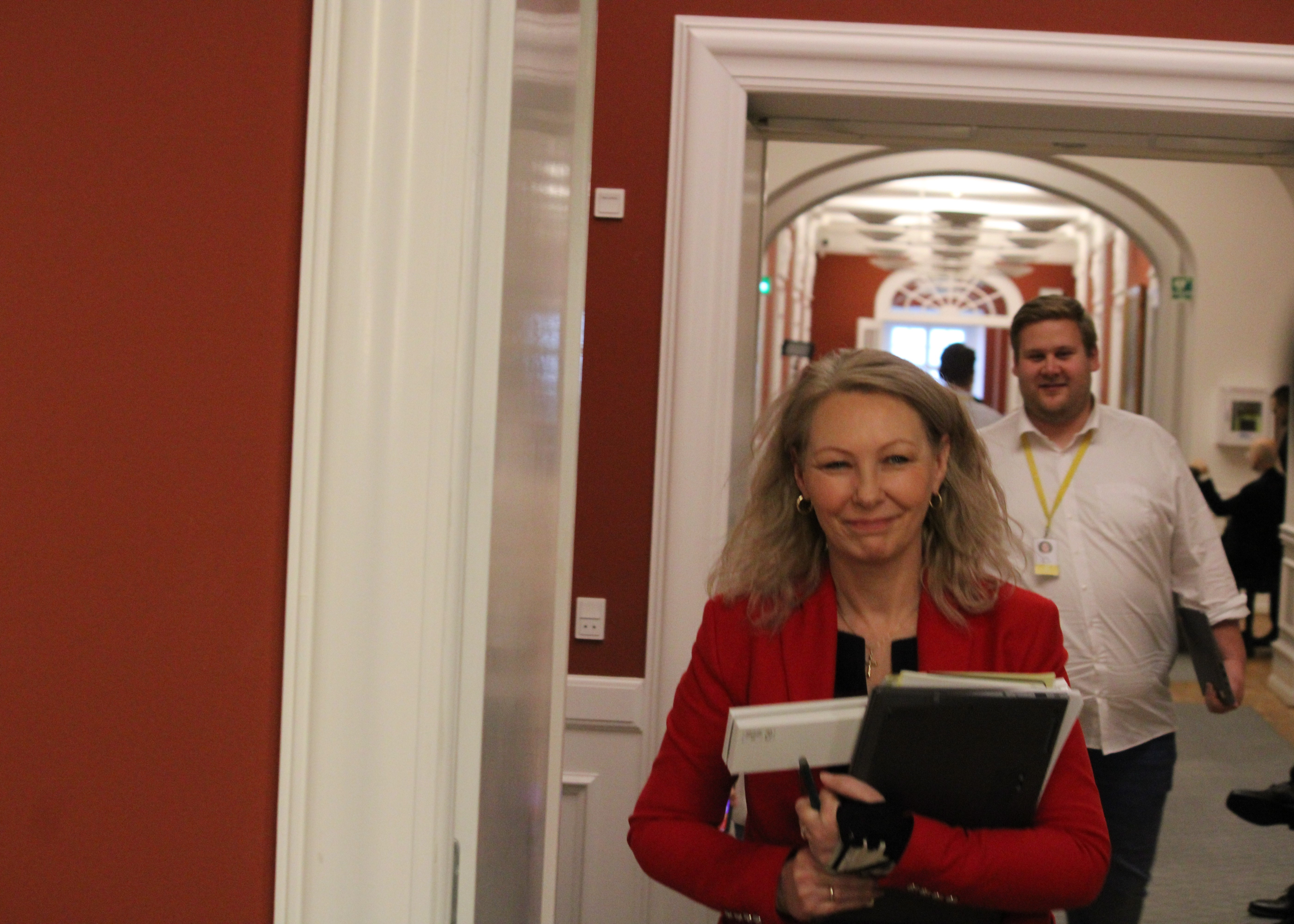
- Raabjerg in 2025

Member of the Folketing
- Incumbent
- Assumed office 3 March 2024
- Preceded by: Søren Pape Poulsen
- Constituency: West Jutland

Personal details
- Born: 6 February 1971 (age 55) Brovst, Denmark
- Party: Conservative People's Party
- Education: VIA University College; Aalborg University

Dina Raabjerg (born 6 February 1971) is a Danish politician. She was Member of the Folketing for the Conservative People's Party from March 2024 until March 2026. She took office due to the death of Søren Pape Poulsen.

Raabjerg took office as Folketing member 12 March 2024 with effect from 3 March as a successor for The Conservative People's Party political leader Søren Pape Poulsen who died of a cerebral hemorrhage. Raabjerg has been a city council member in Ikast-Brande Municipality since 1. January 2022, where she was elected with 313 personal votes. She has also been an EU candidate for the Conservative People's Party at the European Parliament Election 2019, where she with 1,401 personal votes did not achieve election.
