= Mona Juul (Danish politician) =

Danish politician (born 1967)

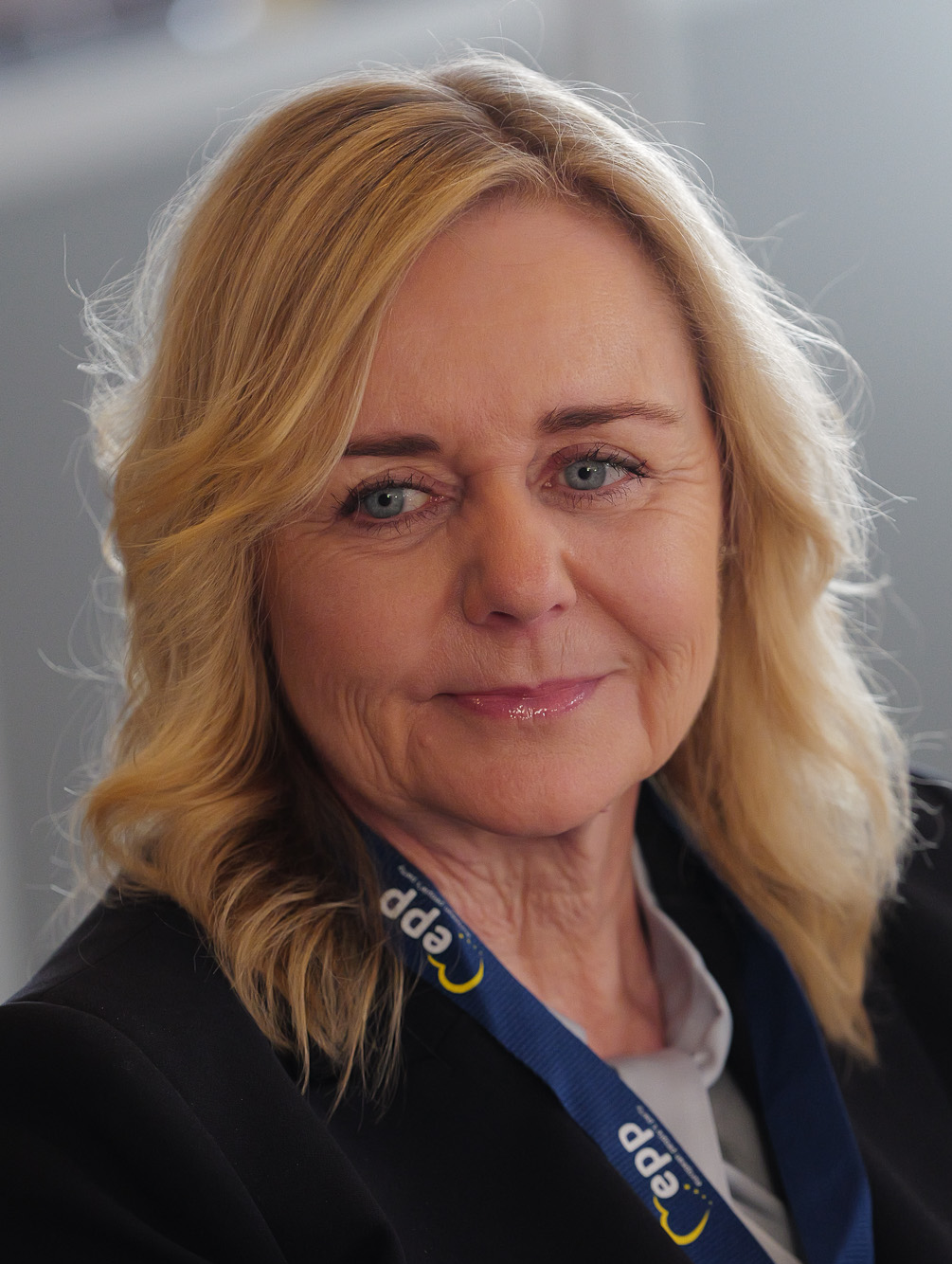
- Juul in 2025

Member of the Folketing
- Incumbent
- Assumed office 5 June 2019
- Constituency: East Jutland

Leader of the Conservative People's Party
- Incumbent
- Assumed office 21 April 2024
- Preceded by: Søren Pape Poulsen

Personal details
- Born: 20 September 1967 (age 58) Aarhus, Denmark
- Party: Conservative People's Party

Mona Juul (born 20 September 1967) is a Danish politician, who is a member of the Folketing for the Conservative People's Party and its leader since 2024. She was first elected to parliament in the 2019 Danish general election.

== Political career ==
=== Member of Parliament ===
Juul was first elected into parliament in the 2019 election from East Jutland, where she received 3,846 votes. She was reelected in 2022 with 3,695 votes. On 9 February 2024, she became parliamentary group leader of the Conservatives, after Mai Mercado stepped down.

=== Leader of the Conservatives ===
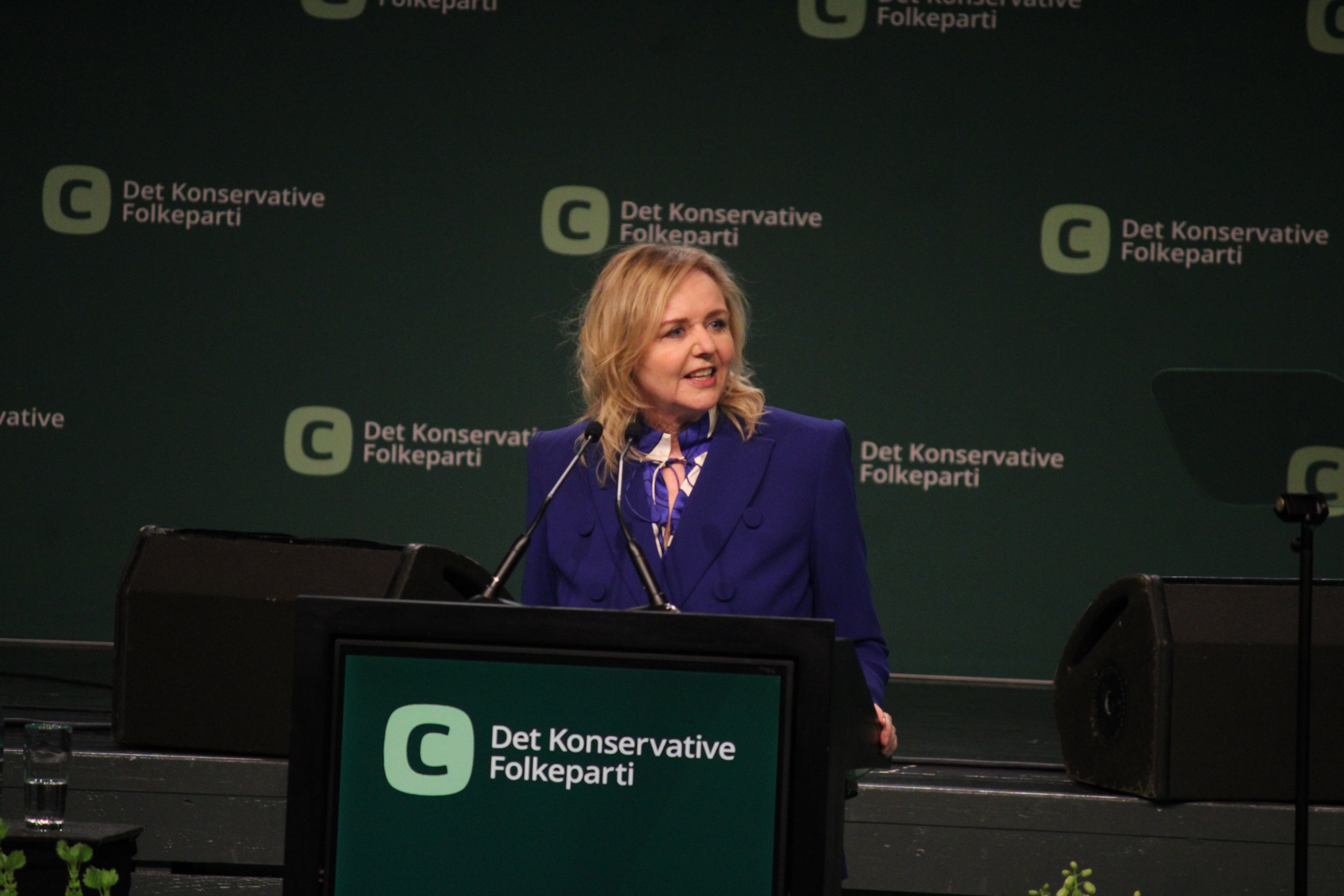
Mona Juul during her first speech as chairman in April 2024

She became leader of the Conservatives on 21 April 2024, after the death of Søren Pape Poulsen.

Following the release of the January 2026 release of the Epstein files, Mona Juul was repeatedly mistaken as the Norwegian politician of the same name by international media.
