= Langå–Struer railway line =

Railway line in Denmark

Langå–Struer Line
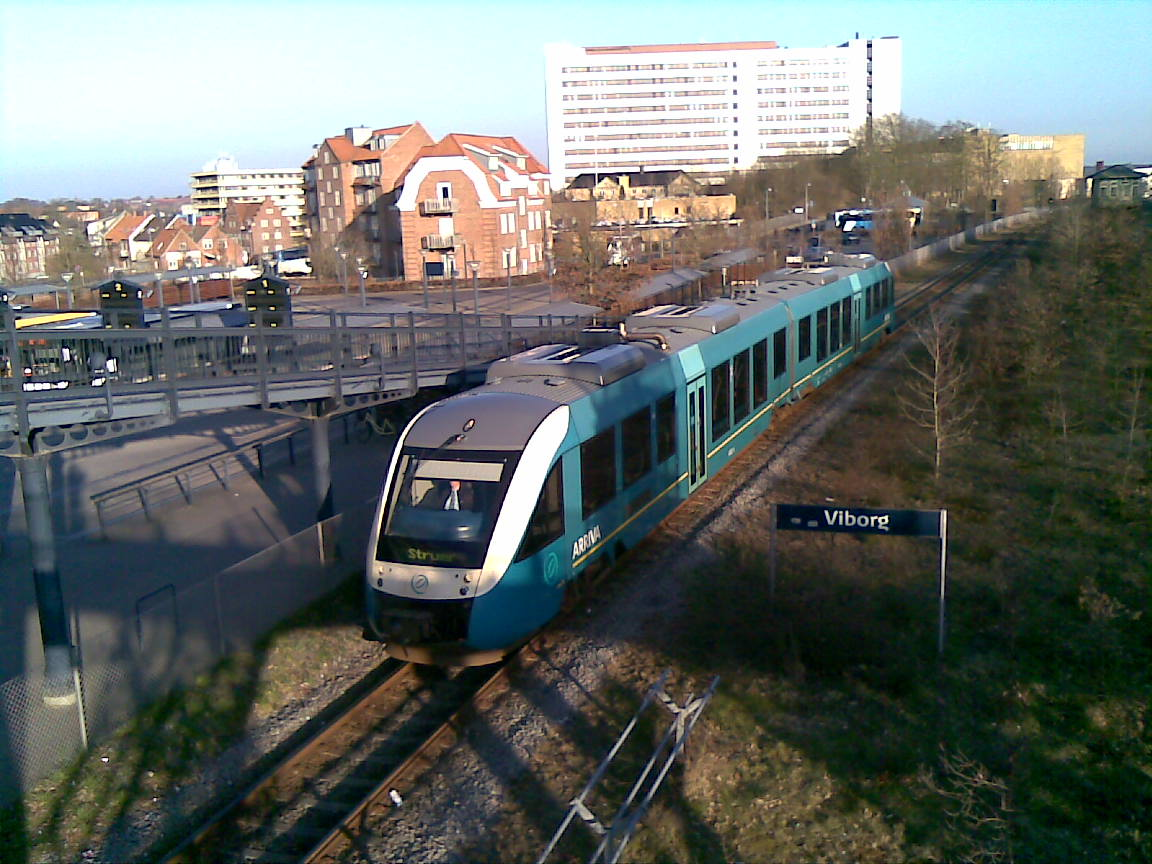
- An Arriva LINT train near Viborg station

Overview
- Native name: Langå-Struer-banen
- Owner: Banedanmark
- Termini: Langå station; Struer station
- Stations: 10

Service
- Type: Railway
- System: Danish railway
- Operator(s): Arriva; DSB

History
- Opened: Langå-Viborg: 21 July 1863; Viborg-Skive: 17 October 1864; Skive-Struer: 17 November 1865

Technical
- Line length: 102.4 kilometres (63.6 mi)
- Number of tracks: Single
- Character: Passenger trains Freight trains
- Track gauge: 1,435 mm (4 ft 8 1/2 in)
- Electrification: None
- Operating speed: 120 km/h
Route map
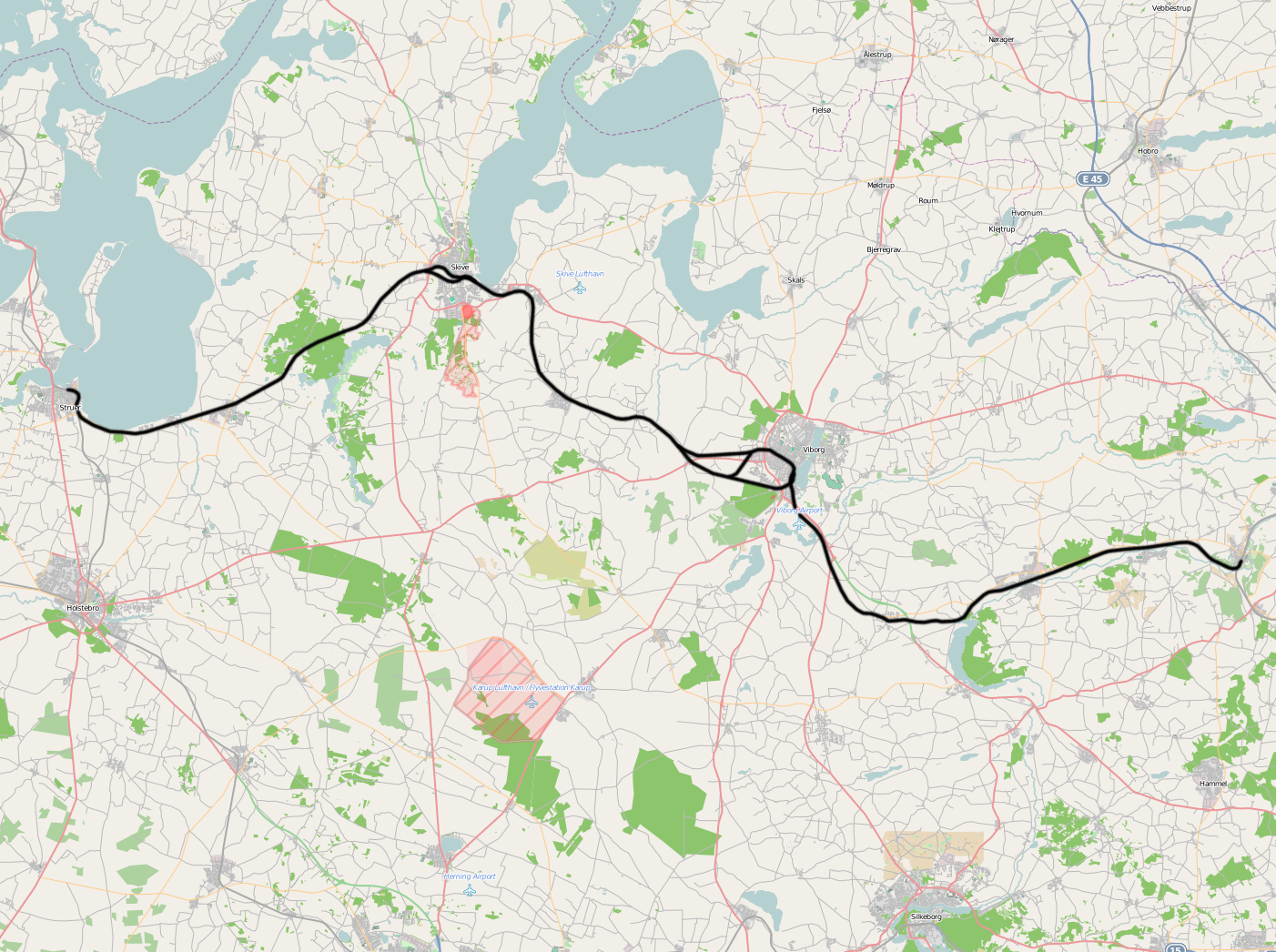

The Langå–Struer railway line (Danish: Langå-Struer banen) is a 102.4 km (63.6 mi) long standard-gauge single-track railway line in Denmark which runs through the central Jutland region between Langå and Struer.

The section from Langå to Viborg opened in 1863, the section from Viborg to Skive in 1864 and the section from Skive to Struer in 1865. The line is owned and maintained by Rail Net Denmark and served with intercity trains by the Danish State Railways (DSB) and regional trains by Arriva.

== History ==
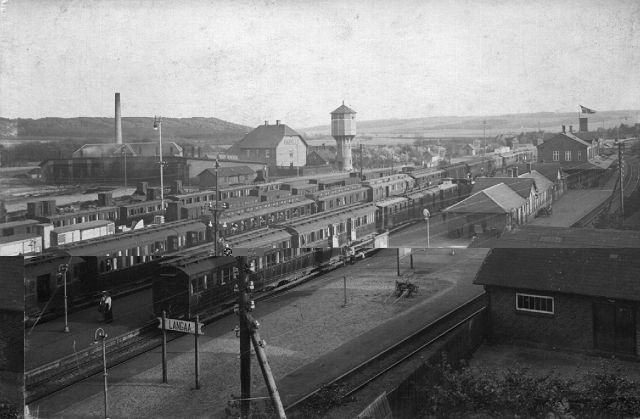
Langå Station in 1912.

The Langå-Struer railway line was the second railway line to open in Northern Jutland after the Aarhus–Randers railway line which opened in 1862.

The line was constructed by the civil engineering partnership Peto, Brassey and Betts for the Danish state. The section from Langå to Viborg opened on 21 July 1863. The section from Viborg to Skive opened on 17 October 1864 and the section from Skive to Struer on 17 November 1865. The construction was influenced by the Second Schleswig War in 1864 which delayed the opening of the sections west of Viborg.

In 2003, operation of the regional rail services on the Langå-Struer railway line were transferred from DSB to the public transport company Arriva.

== Operations ==
=== Regional trains ===
The railway company Arriva runs frequent regional train services from Aarhus Central Station to Struer station.

=== InterCity service ===
The Danish State Railways (DSB) operates two daily InterCity connections between Copenhagen and Struer.

== Stations ==
- Langå (Lg)
- Ulstrup (Up)
- Bjerringbro (Bj)
- Rødkærsbro
- Viborg (Vg)
- Sparkær (Sp)
- Stoholm (Sm)
- Højslev (Hø)
- Skive (Sk)
- Vinderup (Vp)
- Struer (Str)

== See also ==
- List of railway lines in Denmark
