= Søren Vandsø =

Danish politician

Søren Vandsø (born 19 April 1973) is a Danish politician who is the Secretary General of the Conservative People's Party in Denmark. He is the former national chairman of Young Conservatives.

Vandsø is from Them south of Silkeborg, where he still lives with his family.

== Political career ==
Vandsø was elected as national chairman of Young Conservatives at the party's national council in 1996 with just six votes. He was national chairman for two years until he chose to resign at the national council in 1998, after Vandsø had publicly criticised the election of the Conservative People's Party's group chairman Hans Engell.

Vandsø is previously known to have had a sceptical attitude towards the European Union. During his time as national chairman of the Conservative Youth, Vandsø was distinctly Eurosceptic. Several times, Vandsø led campaigns for a 'no' vote in the 1998 Amsterdam Treaty referendum. Shortly after his election as national chairman of Young Conservatives, he stated that both the European Commission and the European Parliament should be abolished and that all decisions should be made in the Council of Ministers.

In 1999, Vandsø had to resign as chairman of the Silkeborg constituency after he had announced that he had voted for Jens Peter Bonde from JuniBevægelsen in the previous European Parliament election.

Vandsø had previously attempted to run in the 2004 EP elections, but shortly before the regional council in 2003, he decided to abandon his plans to run when he experienced strong opposition within the Conservative People's Party.

In 2007, Vandsø left the Conservative People's Party and joined the Liberal Party, citing that there were "higher ceilings". However, he later returned to the Conservatives and became party secretary in 2015.
