= Viborg, Denmark =

Capital city in Mid Jutland, Denmark

Viborg
- City
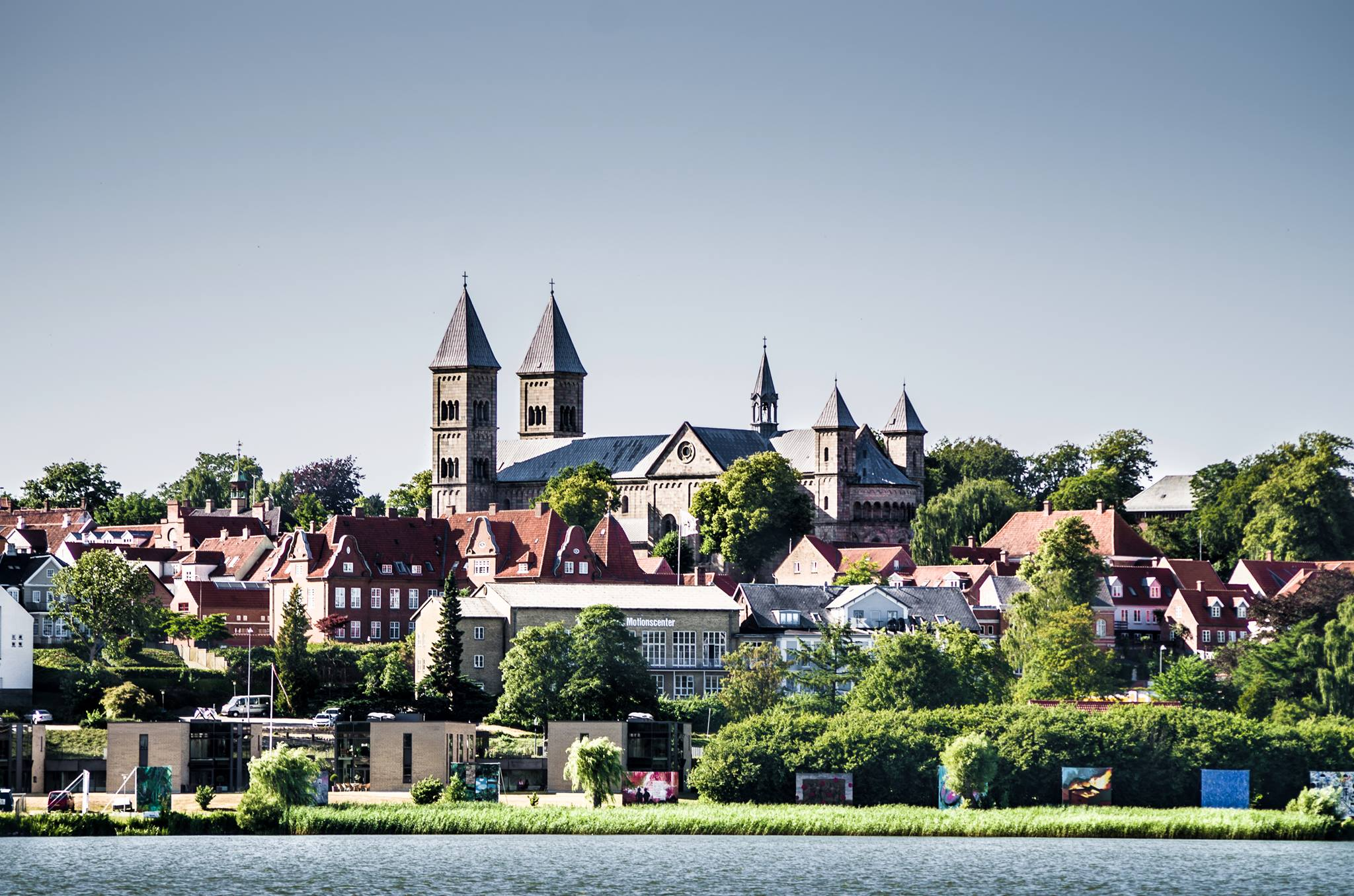
- View of Viborg and its monumental cathedral (Viborg Domkirke), as seen from the Søndersø lake.

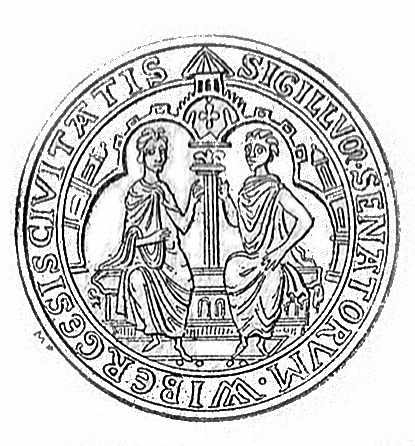
- Seal Coat of arms

- Location within Denmark Location within Central Denmark Region
- Coordinates: 56°27′12″N 09°24′07″E
- Country: Denmark
- Region: Central Denmark Region
- Municipality: Viborg
- Earliest evidence: 8th century

Government
  - Mayor: Katrine Fusager Rohde (Venstre)

Area
  - Urban: 26.9 km^{2} (10.4 sq mi)
- Elevation: 51 m (167 ft)

Population (1 January 2026)
  - Urban: 44,021
  - Urban density: 1,640/km^{2} (4,240/sq mi)
  - Gender: 21,545 males and 22,476 females
  - Municipal: 97,874
- Demonym: Viborgenser
- Time zone: UTC+1 (CET)
  - Summer (DST): UTC+2 (CEST)
- Postal code: 8800
- Area code: (+45) 8
- Website: viborg.dk

Viborg (Danish pronunciation: [ˈviˌpɒˀ]) is a city in central Jutland, Denmark, the capital of both Viborg municipality and Region Midtjylland. Viborg is also the seat of the Western High Court, the High Court for the Jutland peninsula. Viborg Municipality is the second-largest Danish municipality, covering 3.3% of the country's total land area.

== History ==
Viborg is one of the oldest cities in Denmark, with Viking settlements dating back to the late 8th century. Its central location gave the city great strategic importance, in political and religious matters, during the Middle Ages. A motte-and-bailey-type castle was once located in the city. Viborg's name is a combination of two Old Norse words: vé, meaning a holy place, and borg, meaning a fort, but the original name of the town was Vvibiærgh, where -biærgh means hill (modern Danish -bjerg (mountain).

== Economy ==
Viborg municipality is where the Apple Foulum Data Center is located which opened in September 2020.

== Sights ==
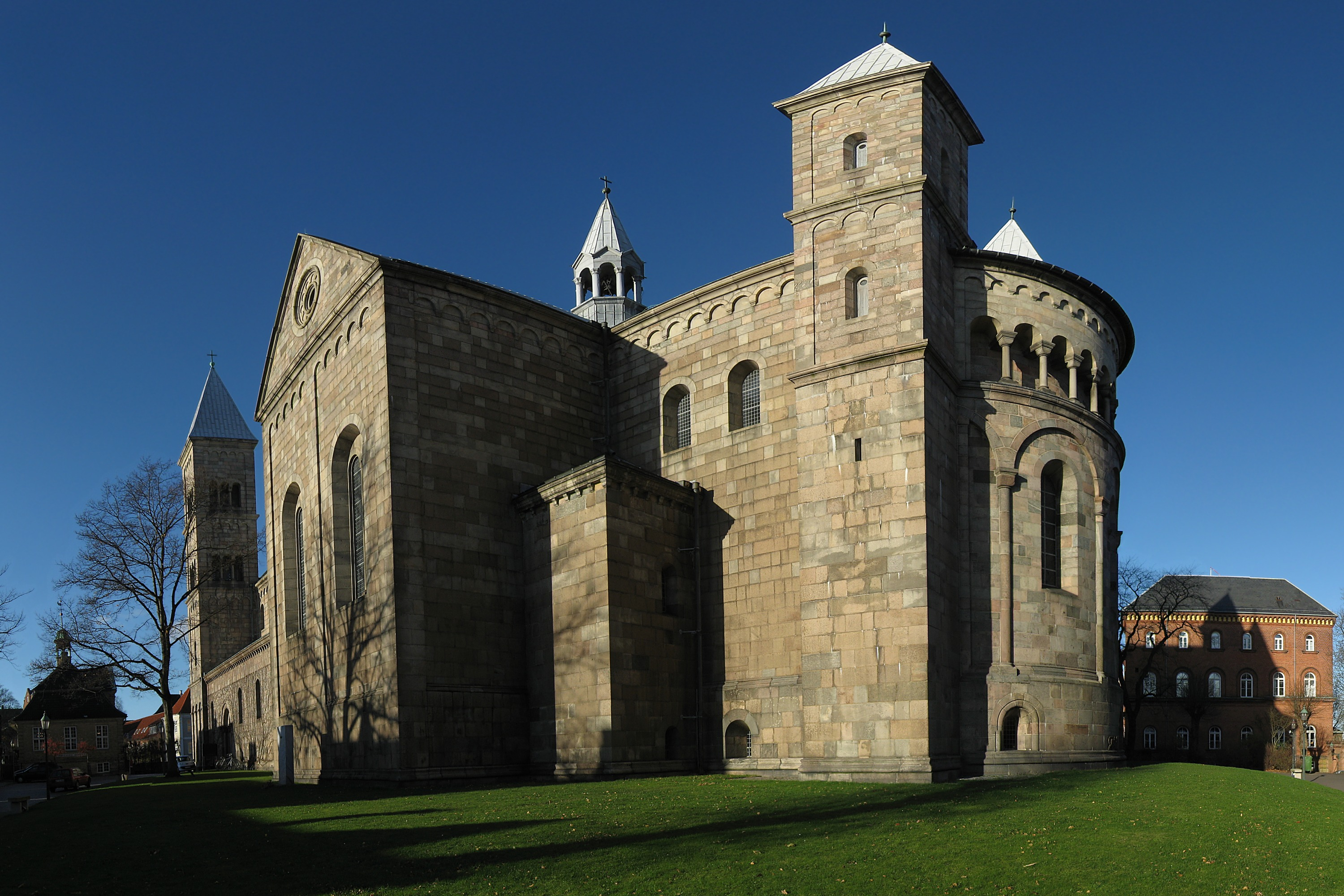
Viborg Cathedral

Viborg is famous for Viborg Cathedral. The construction of the cathedral started in 1130 and took about 50 years. The building has burned to the ground and been re-built several times. Only the crypt of the original cathedral is still preserved. The cathedral was and is the locus of cult of Saint Kjeld of Viborg who was dean of the cathedral chapter there and had a great shrine there in the Middle Ages. The newest parts of the church are from a restoration between 1864 and 1876. The cathedral is famous for its many paintings by Danish painter Joakim Skovgaard, which depict stories from the Bible. Next to the cathedral is the Skovgaard museum, founded in 1937.

Before the Protestant Reformation Viborg was the home of five monasteries, about 12 parish churches, several chapels and of course the cathedral. The Black Friars' church dates from the 13th century. Today only the cathedral and a few remains of the Franciscan and the Dominican monasteries are left.

== Sports ==
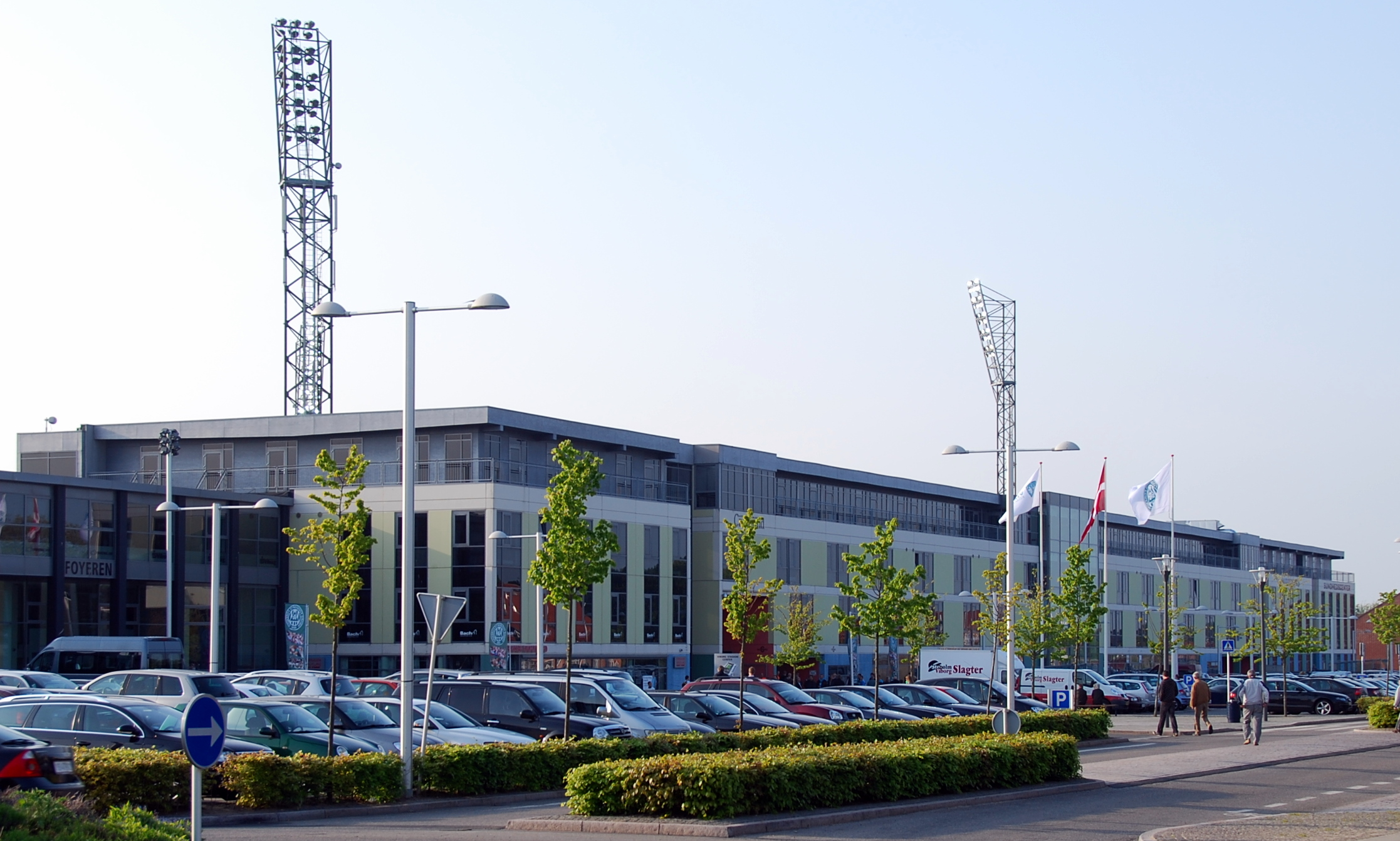
Viborg Stadium

Since the 1990s, Viborg has had a reputation as one of Denmark's leading cities for sports. It started with handball, a popular sport in Denmark, when the women's handball team Viborg HK became one of best five clubs in Europe, and continued when both the men's handball team and the professional football team established themselves in their respective domestic leagues. From 1998 to 2008, Viborg FF was a member of the Danish Superliga, reaching an all-time high by winning the Danish cup in 2000.

Viborg hosts the annual Haervejsmarchen international two-day walking festival, which regularly attracts 8,000 participants, including many from outside Denmark. It includes marked routes of distances of up to 45 kilometres a day. The walk is affiliated to the IML Walking Association.

== Education ==
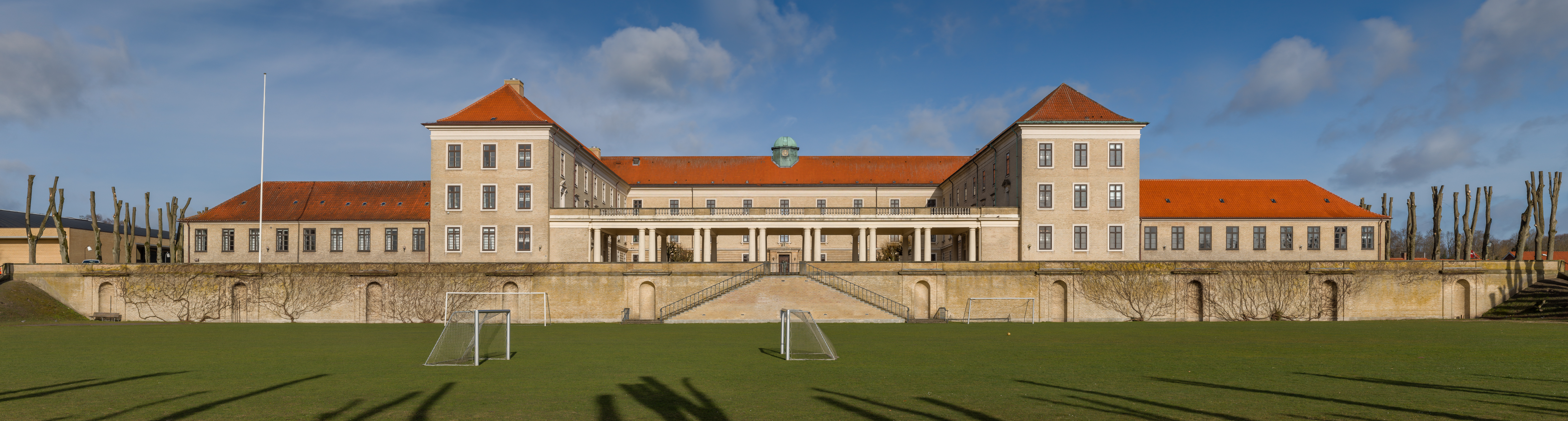
Viborg Katedralskole

Viborg is home to a number of educational institutions, including Viborg Katedralskole (cathedral school). Denmark's oldest educational institution celebrated its 900th birthday in 2000. The school is believed to have been founded about 1060, at the same time as the city became the seat of a bishop. The church needed to educate boys and young men to enter into the church's service, and to that purpose it created a school. Its current monumental home was built in 1926 to accommodate a larger number of students and later the school added a dormitory to house the many students from outer regions or islands not close to a gymnasium. Although this role is now basically obsolete, the dorm continues to be a popular solution for many students wanting to get away from home or for a small number of students from Greenland. Viborg Katedralskole is today one of four gymnasiums in Viborg.

Viborg is also home to The Animation Workshop, an art school based in a former army barracks on the outskirts of town. The school, which achieved official recognition from the Danish government in 2003, offers students a Bachelor of Arts in character animation.

== Transportation ==
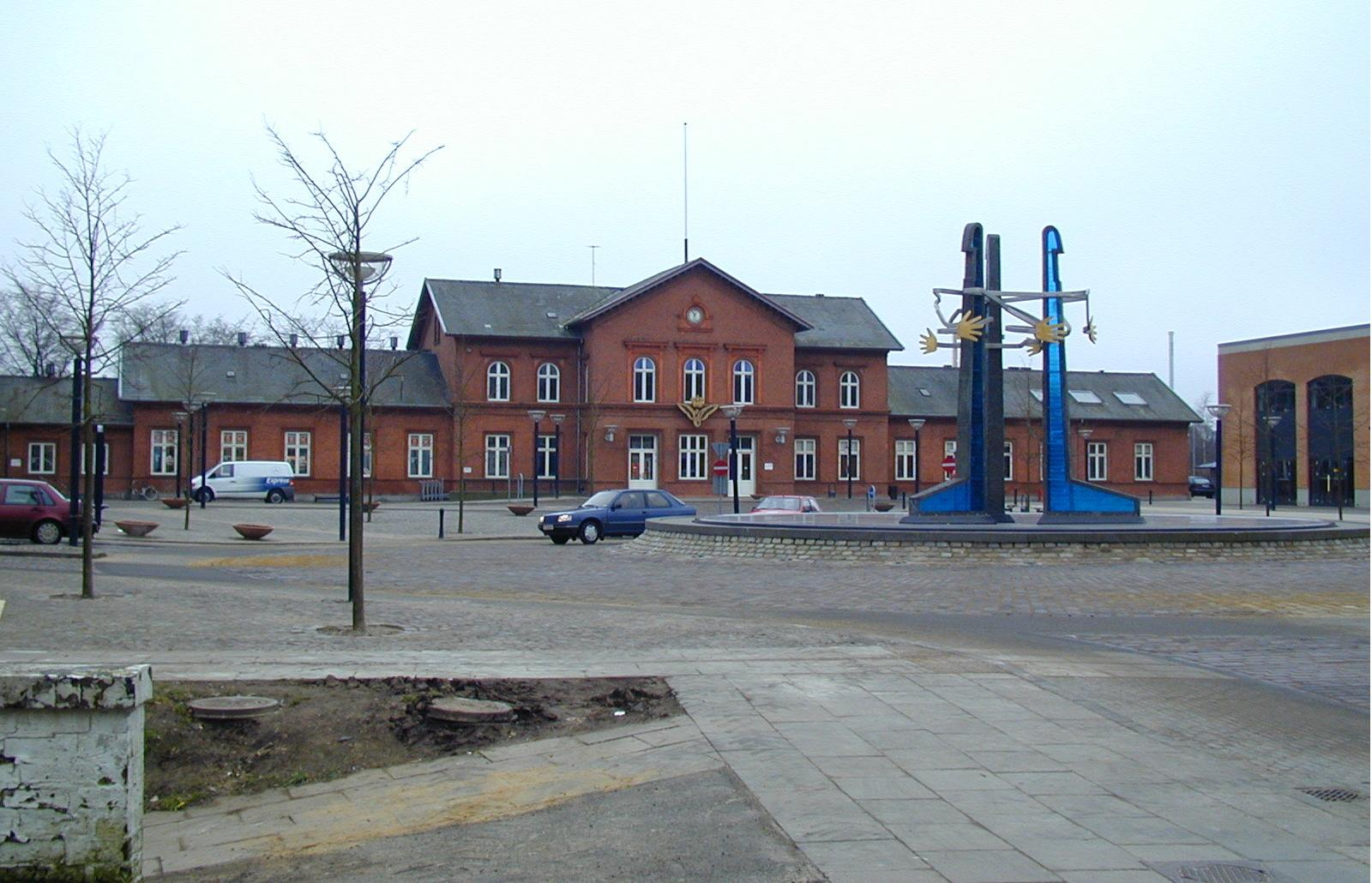
Front façade of Viborg station.

=== Rail ===
Viborg is served by Viborg railway station. It is located on the Langå–Struer railway line and offers direct InterCity services to Copenhagen and Struer and regional train services to Aarhus and Struer.

== Notable people ==
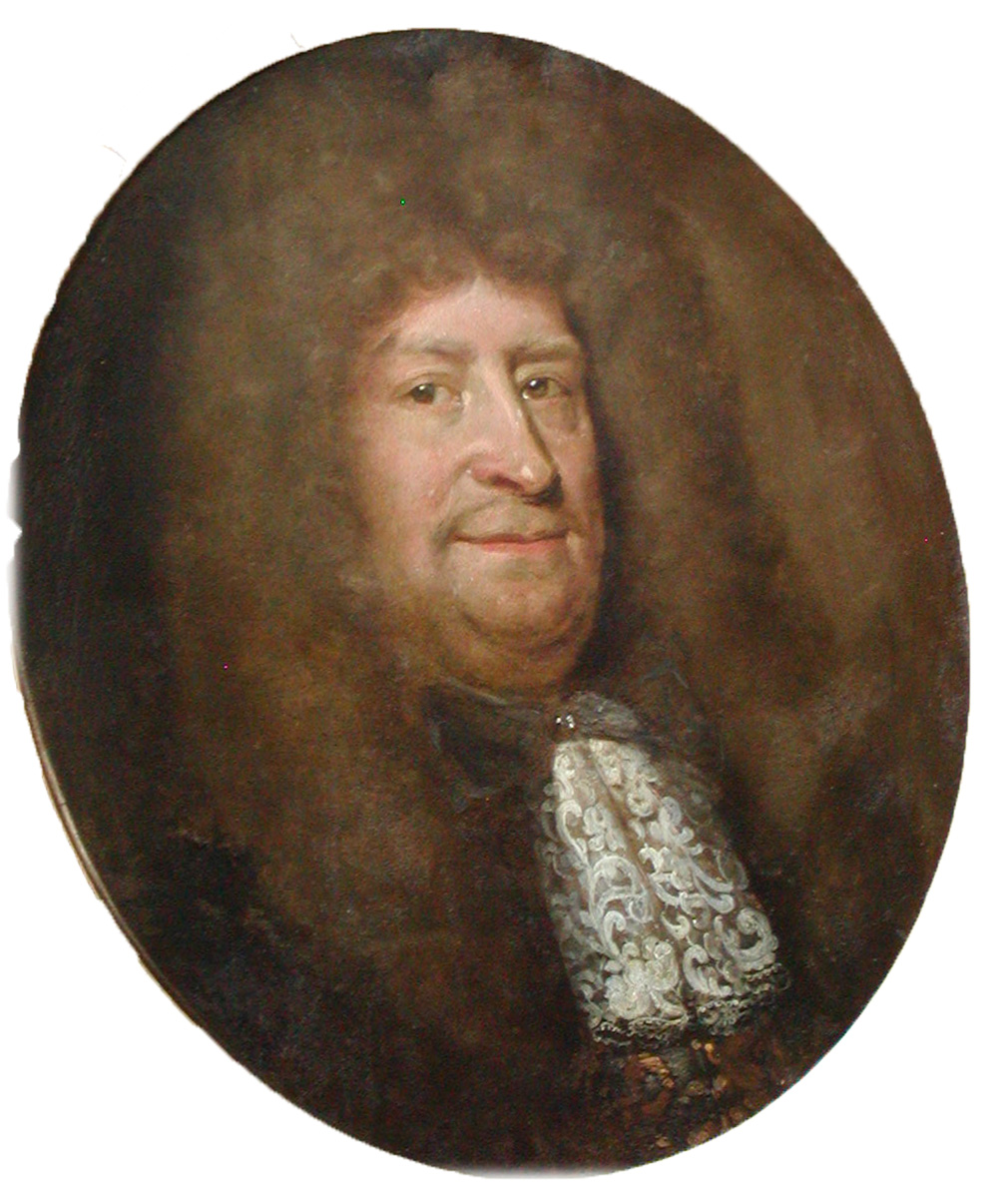
Vitus Bering

=== Public service and thinking ===
- Saint Vibor
- Saint Kjeld (died 1150), Archdeacon, canonized 1188
- Biskop Gunner (da, 1152–1251), Bishop, co-writer of the Law of Jutland
- Knud Mikkelsen (da, 1421-1478/1488), Bishop, contributor to the Law of Jutland
- Niels Kaas (1535 in Stårupgård –1594) politician, Chancellor of Denmark 1573-1594
- Vitus Bering (1617–1675) poet, historian and Supreme Court justice
- Carl Gottlob Rafn (1769–1808) enlightenment scientist and civil servant
- Sophie Zahrtmann (1841 in Vammen – 1925) deaconess and nurse
- Hans Christian Cornelius Mortensen (1856–1921), ornithologist, taught in Viborg
- Bertel Dahlgaard (1887–1972) politician and statistician
- Kåre Pugerup (born 1964) diplomat and Chief of Staff at the UN agency IFAD in Rome
- Torsten Nielsen (born 1967 in Sparkær) politician, Mayor of Viborg Municipality since 2014
- Anders Primdahl Vistisen (born 1987 in Vridsted) DPP politician and MEP

=== Arts ===
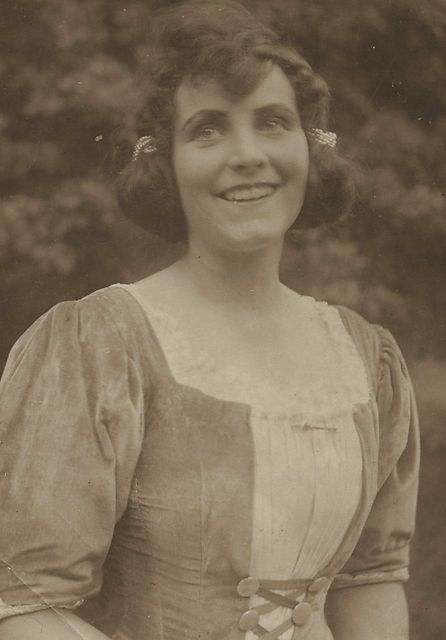
Gudrun Houlberg, 1916

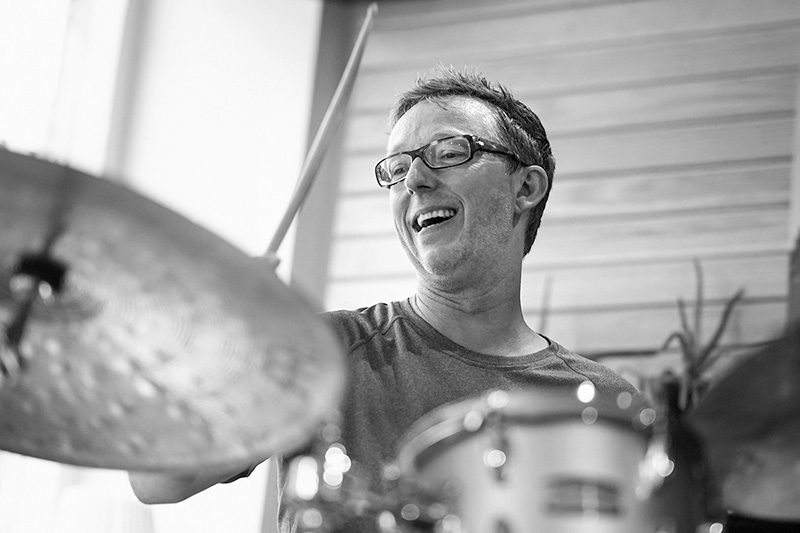
Morten Lund, 2017

- Christen Aagaard (1616—1664) poet, academic and theologian
- Carl Deichman (1705–1780) Norwegian mine operator, book collector and philanthropist
- Mads Alstrup (1808–1876) first Danish portrait photographer with his own studio
- Kristian Mantzius (1819–1879) actor, popular with his audience but not his bosses
- Jeppe Aakjær (1866–1930) poet and novelist, a member of the Jutland Movement
- Anders Randolf (1870–1930) Danish American actor in American films
- Benjamin Christensen (1879–1959), film director, screenwriter and actor
- Tyge Hvass (1885 in Randrup – 1963) a Danish functionalist architect
- A. W. Sandberg (1887–1938) a Danish film director and screenwriter
- Jens Klok (1889–1974) a Danish architect with the Royal Danish Navy
- Gudrun Houlberg (1889–1940) actress
- Olaf Wieghorst (1899–1988), painter of the American West
- Peter Seeberg (1925–1999), writer, worked in Viborg as a museum custodian
- Johann Otto von Spreckelsen (1929–1987), architect
- Peer Hultberg (1935–2007), a Danish author and psychoanalyst, lived in Viborg as a child
- Freddy Milton (born 1948 in Overlund) a Danish comics artist and writer
- Poul Martin Bonde (born 1958) songwriter and spokesperson of Smukfest
- Frank Hvam (born 1970) stand-up-comedian
- Morten Lund (born 1972) jazz drummer
- Lise Rønne (born 1978) a Danish journalist and TV presenter
- Rasmussen (born 1985) stage name of Jonas Flodager Rasmussen, Danish singer and actor

=== Sport ===
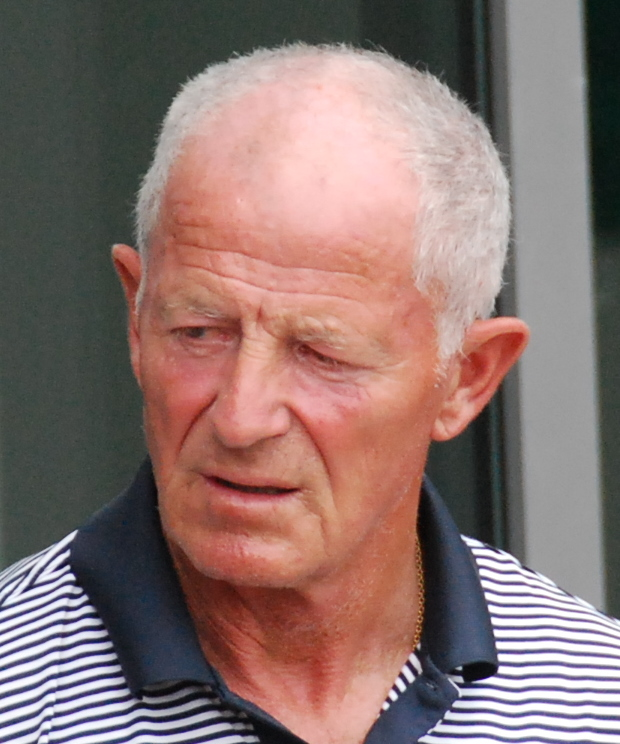
Finn Døssing, 2011

- Charles Buchwald (1880 in Bjerringbro – 1951) amateur footballer, won silver medals at the 1908 and 1912 Summer Olympics
- Finn Døssing Jensen (born 1941) former footballer, 349 appearances for Viborg FF
- Ulrik Wilbek (born 1958) successful handball coach and Mayor of Viborg since 2018
- Nicolai Vollquartz (born 1965) football referee
- Nikolaj Jacobsen (born 1971) a handball coach and former player with 148 caps for Denmark
- Steffen Højer (born 1973) former football player, 380 club caps, many for Viborg FF
- Brian Buur (born 1977) (as Brian Sorensen) a former Danish darts player
- Henrik Dalsgaard (born 1989 in Roum) footballer, over 300 club caps, played for Brentford.

== In popular culture ==
In the science fiction book The Corridors of Time by Poul Anderson, a Danish-American writer who did considerable research on Danish history, a large part of the plot takes place in 16th-century Viborg. The protagonist - an American time traveller from the 20th century - arrives in the city in 1535 and gets involved with the adherents of the overthrown King Christian II and of the peasant rebel leader Skipper Clement, who face savage persecution in the city.

Viborg is also the setting of "Number 13", a ghost story by the English writer M.R. James.

== Twin towns—sister cities ==
Viborg is twinned with:

- Bayeux, France

== Climate ==
Climate data for Viborg (Midtjyllands Airport) (1993–2020 normals, extremes 1971–2000)
Month	Jan	Feb	Mar	Apr	May	Jun	Jul	Aug	Sep	Oct	Nov	Dec	Year
Record high °C (°F)	11.3 (52.3)	12.2 (54.0)	22.2 (72.0)	26.8 (80.2)	28.4 (83.1)	30.1 (86.2)	32.7 (90.9)	34.6 (94.3)	27.8 (82.0)	23.0 (73.4)	16.0 (60.8)	12.3 (54.1)	34.6 (94.3)
Mean daily maximum °C (°F)	3.7 (38.7)	4.0 (39.2)	6.8 (44.2)	12.2 (54.0)	16.2 (61.2)	18.9 (66.0)	21.2 (70.2)	21.2 (70.2)	17.3 (63.1)	12.5 (54.5)	7.7 (45.9)	4.7 (40.5)	12.2 (54.0)
Daily mean °C (°F)	1.3 (34.3)	1.6 (34.9)	3.3 (37.9)	7.8 (46.0)	11.4 (52.5)	14.5 (58.1)	16.7 (62.1)	16.7 (62.1)	13.4 (56.1)	9.2 (48.6)	5.2 (41.4)	2.3 (36.1)	8.6 (47.5)
Mean daily minimum °C (°F)	−1.1 (30.0)	−0.9 (30.4)	−0.1 (31.8)	3.4 (38.1)	6.7 (44.1)	10.2 (50.4)	12.2 (54.0)	12.2 (54.0)	9.5 (49.1)	6.0 (42.8)	2.7 (36.9)	−0.1 (31.8)	5.1 (41.1)
Record low °C (°F)	−28.4 (−19.1)	−21.0 (−5.8)	−16.3 (2.7)	−7.8 (18.0)	−4.0 (24.8)	1.1 (34.0)	3.7 (38.7)	1.0 (33.8)	−2.3 (27.9)	−5.3 (22.5)	−18.0 (−0.4)	−24.0 (−11.2)	−28.4 (−19.1)
Average precipitation mm (inches)	67.7 (2.67)	45.9 (1.81)	55.5 (2.19)	40.8 (1.61)	48.1 (1.89)	63.3 (2.49)	59.3 (2.33)	68.7 (2.70)	84.5 (3.33)	86.7 (3.41)	81.1 (3.19)	77.0 (3.03)	778.5 (30.65)
Average precipitation days (≥ 1.0 mm)	12.6	9.6	11.2	8.2	8.0	9.6	9.4	10.3	12.2	12.8	13.9	13.9	131.6
Average snowy days	7.3	6.3	4.9	1.6	0.1	0	0	0	0	0.2	2.6	5.8	28.8
Average relative humidity (%)	89.7	86.7	82.6	74.5	73.2	74.9	77.3	80.1	84.5	87.3	90.8	97.7	83.3
Source 1: Danish Meteorological Institute (precipitation, sun and snow 1971–2000, humidity 2008–2020)
Source 2: IEM

== See also ==
- St. John's Priory, Viborg
- Chronicle of the Expulsion of the Grayfriars#Chapter 2 Concerning the Friary at Viborg

"Gymnasium" is the Danish equivalent of high school. It is not what English speakers call a gym, or place to work out. It offers a very rigorous education for college-bound students.
