= Langå =

- town
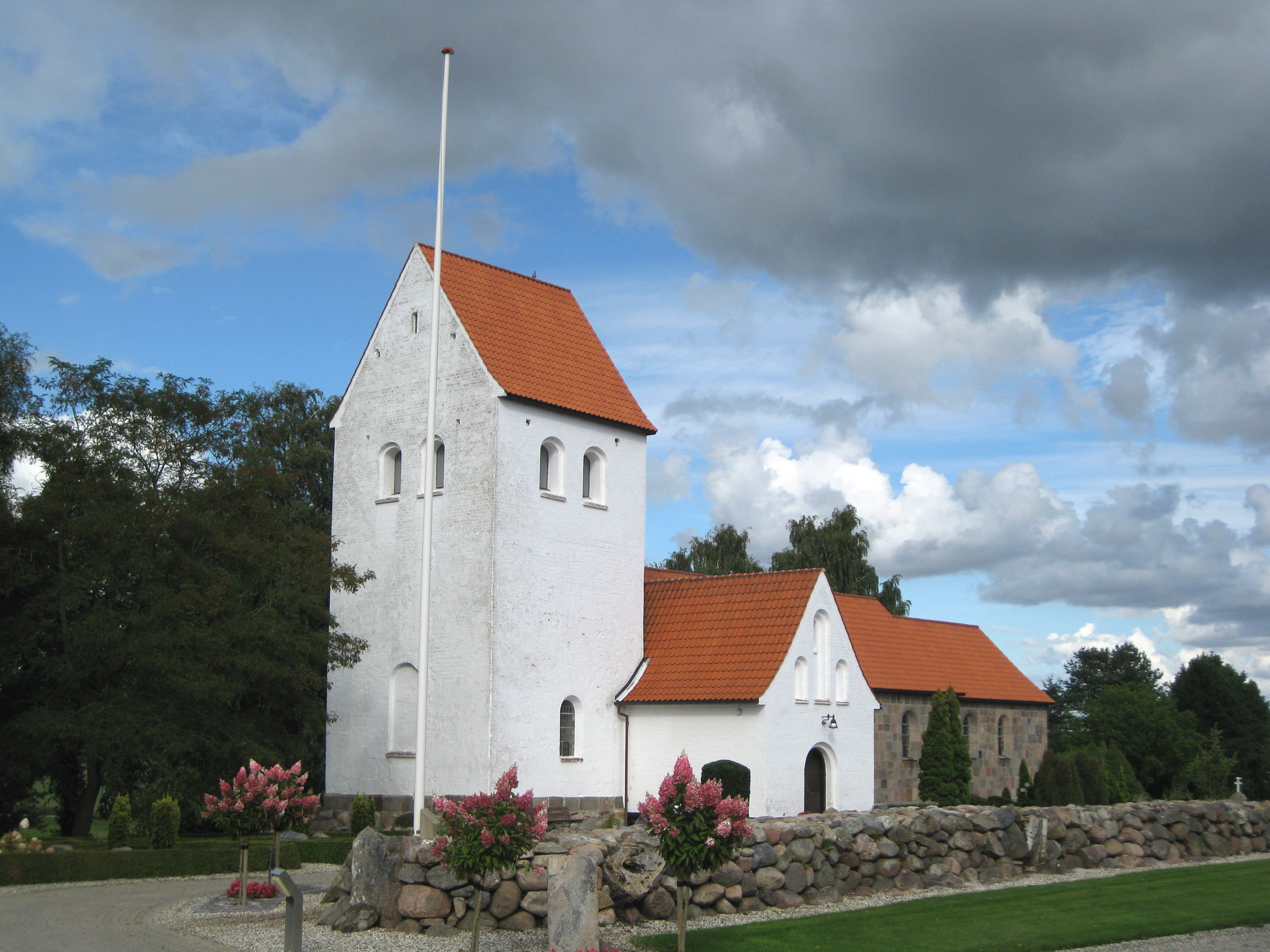
- Langå church

- Location in Denmark Langå (Central Denmark Region)
- Coordinates: 56.393°N 9.894°E
- Country: Denmark
- Region: Central Denmark (Midtjylland)
- Municipality: Randers Municipality

Area
  - Urban: 2.3 km^{2} (0.89 sq mi)

Population (2026)
  - Urban: 2,901
  - Urban density: 1,300/km^{2} (3,300/sq mi)
- Time zone: UTC+1 (CET)
  - Summer (DST): UTC+2 (CEST)
- Postal code: DK-8870 Langå

Langå, is a railway town in central Denmark with a population of 2.901 (2026), located in Randers municipality in Region Midtjylland in Jutland. It was the site of the municipal council of the now former Langå municipality, until 1 January 2007. Langå is located by the railroad stretch between Randers and Århus and is the beginning of the railroad stretch towards Viborg and Struer. The motto of Langå is "Alle spor fører til Langå" (All tracks leads to Langå) for its placement between the two railroad tracks.

== Gallery ==
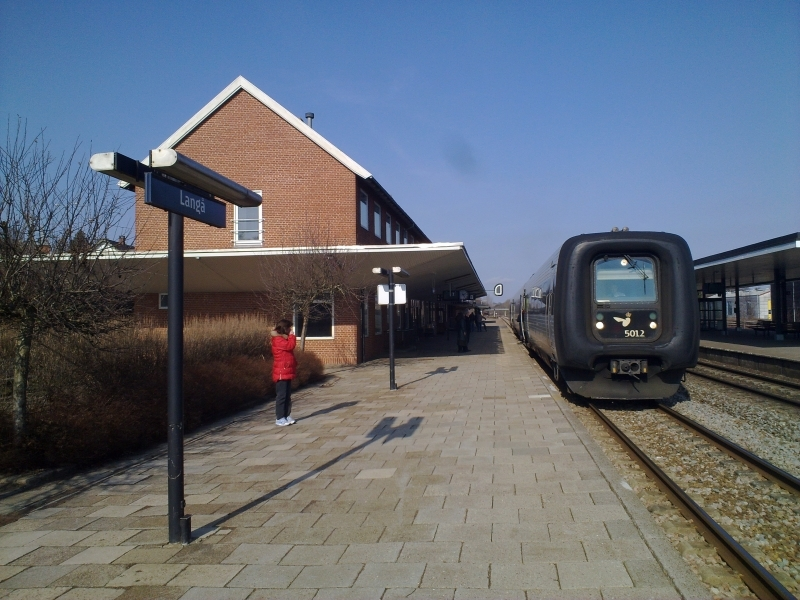
Langå railway station

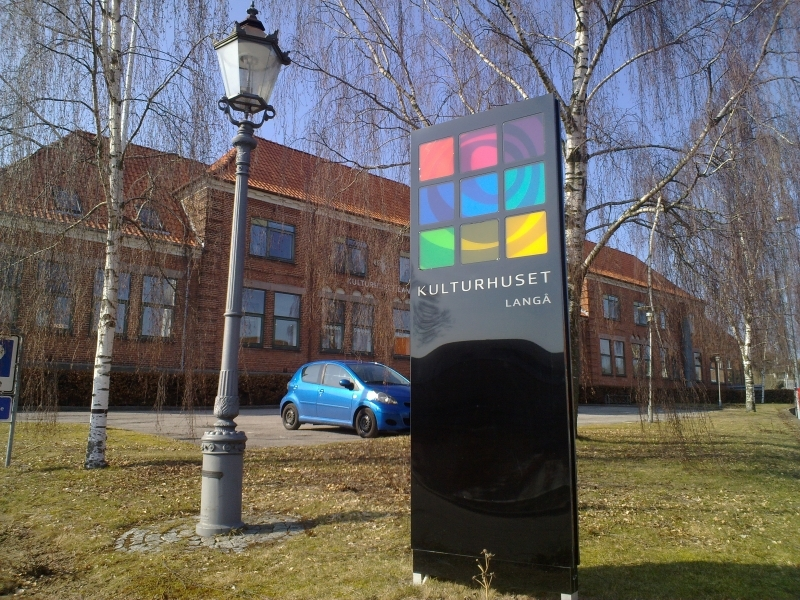
Cultural center with library

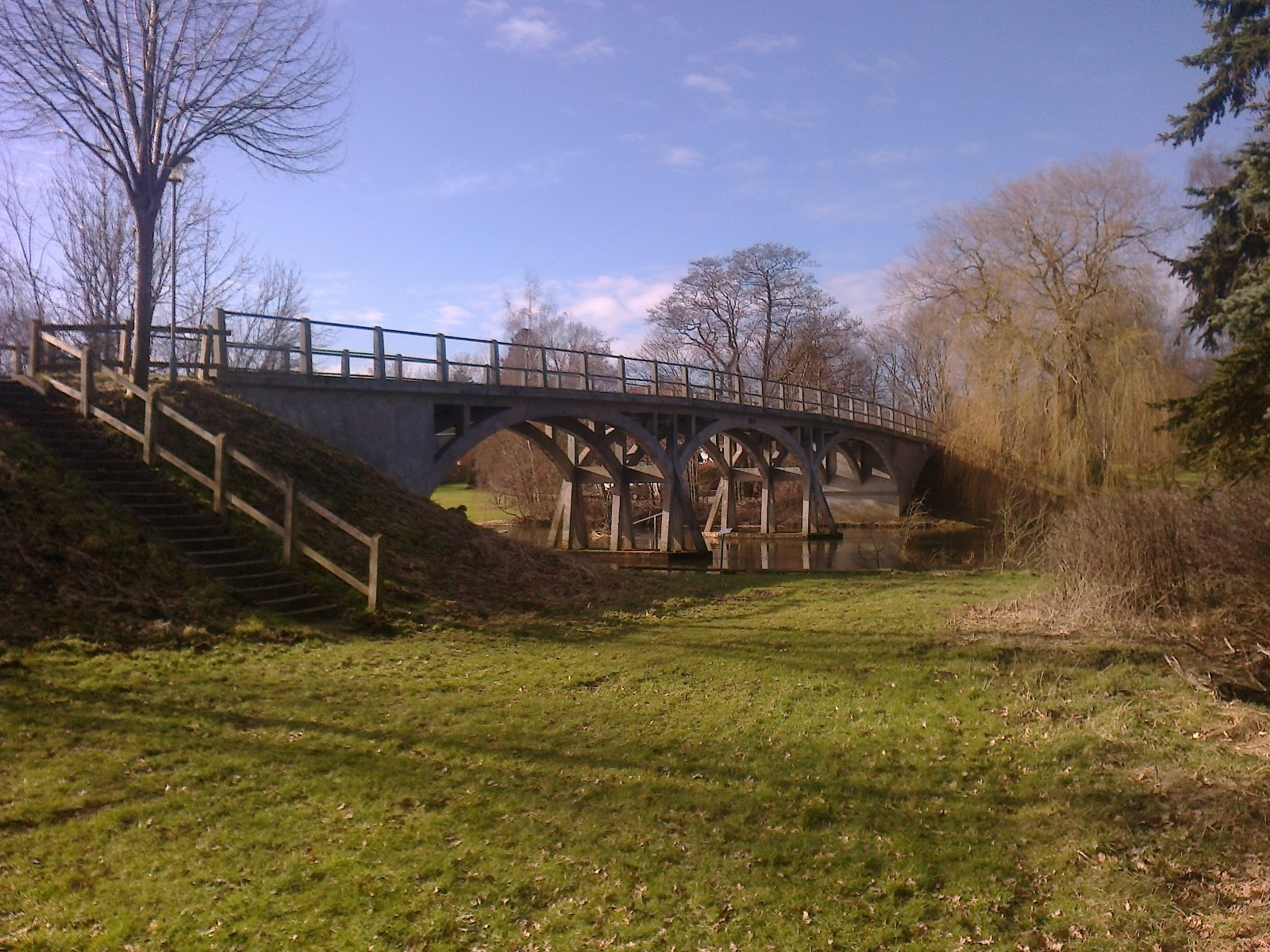
Amtmand Hoppes Bro from 1905 is the oldest road bridge in Denmark made of reinforced concrete.

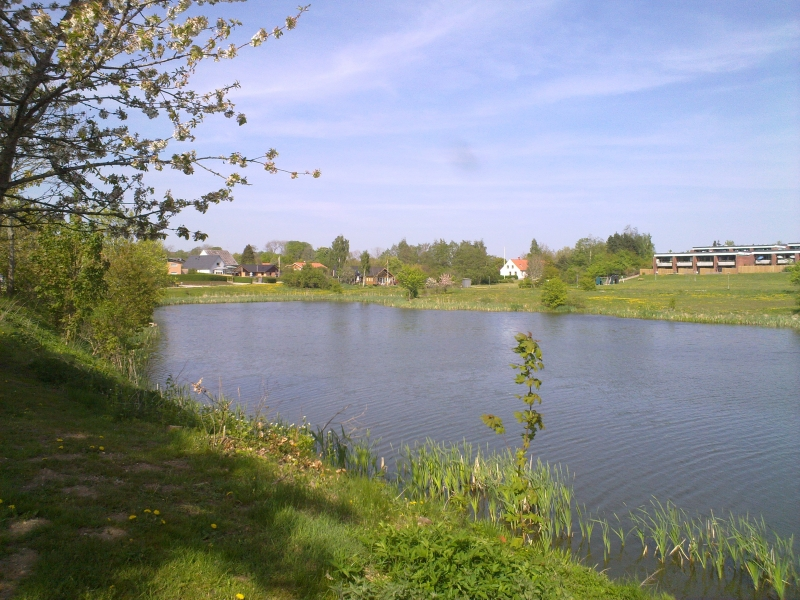
Langå Lake

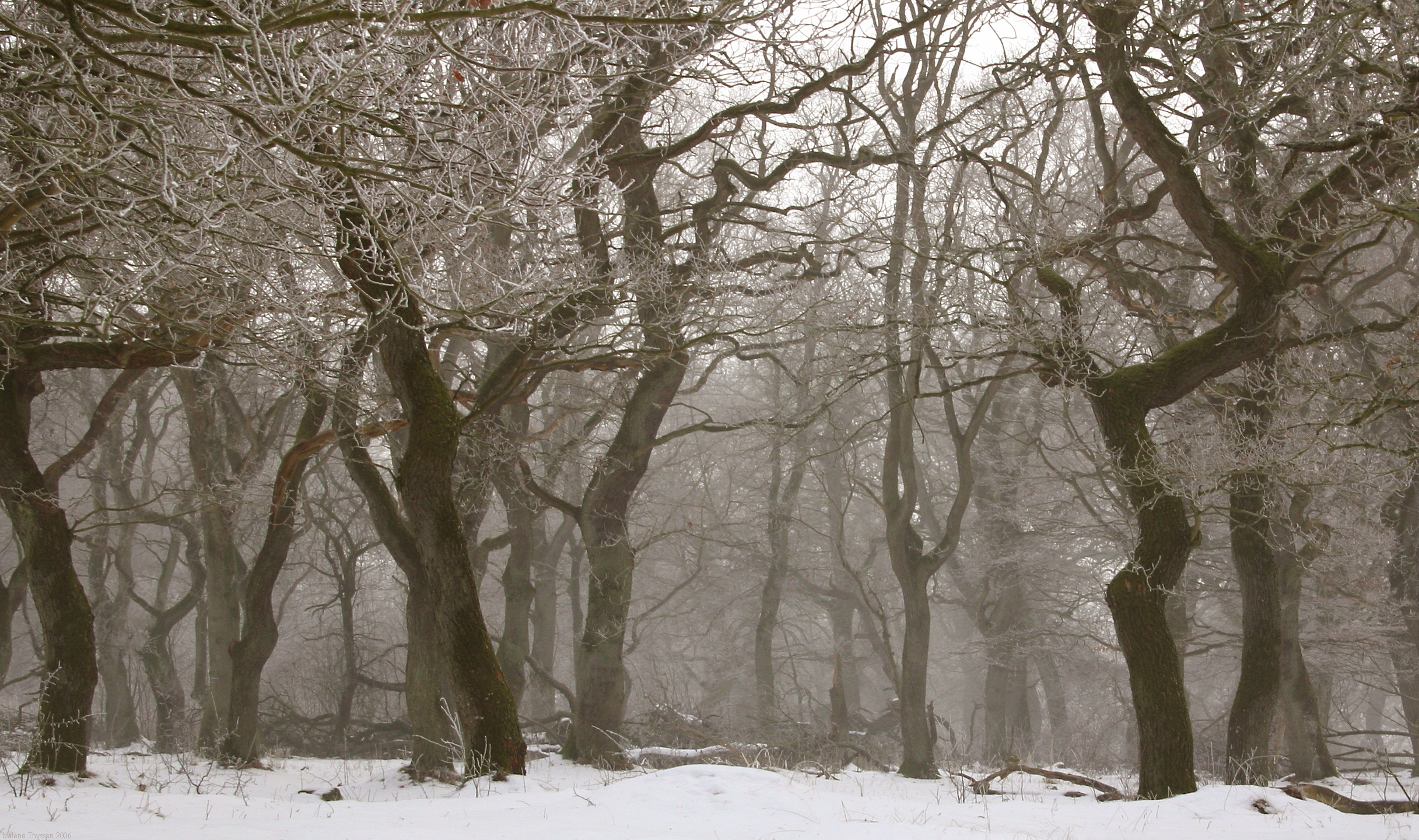
Langå Egeskov, Langå wood pasture

== Notable people ==
- Rasmussen (born 1985) a Danish singer and actor, represented Denmark in the Eurovision Song Contest 2018 singing "Higher Ground". He lives in Langå with his wife and two children.
