= Tourism in Denmark =

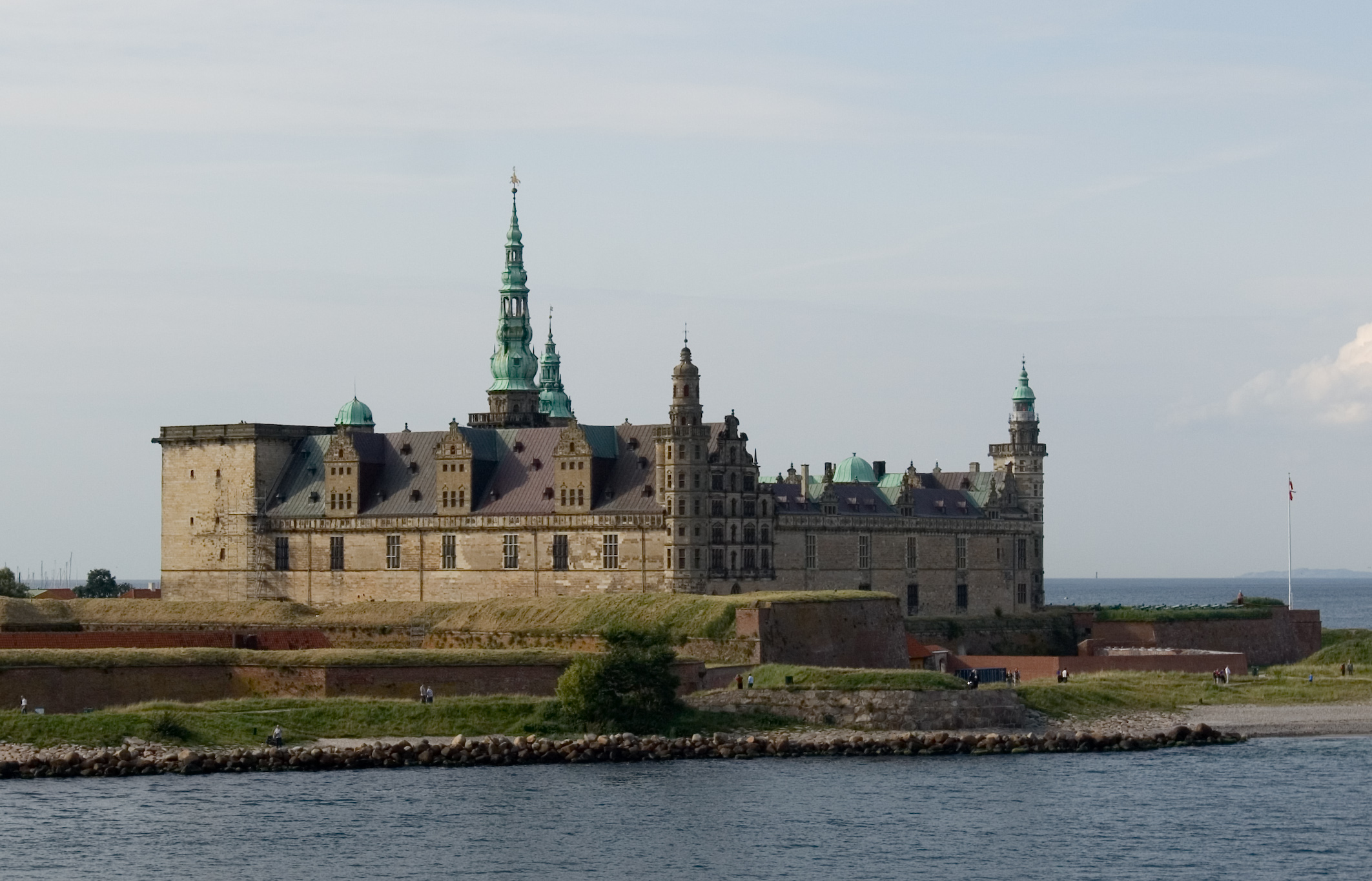
Kronborg Castle, Helsingør

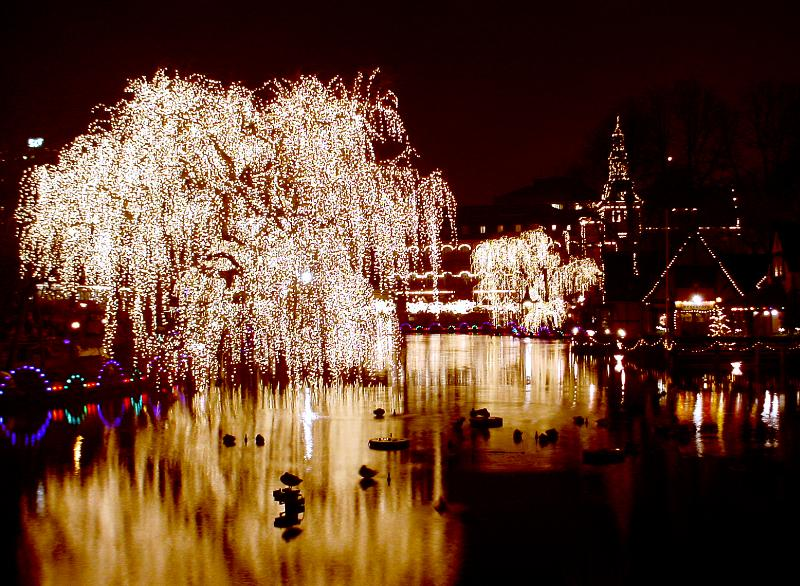
Tivoli, Copenhagen

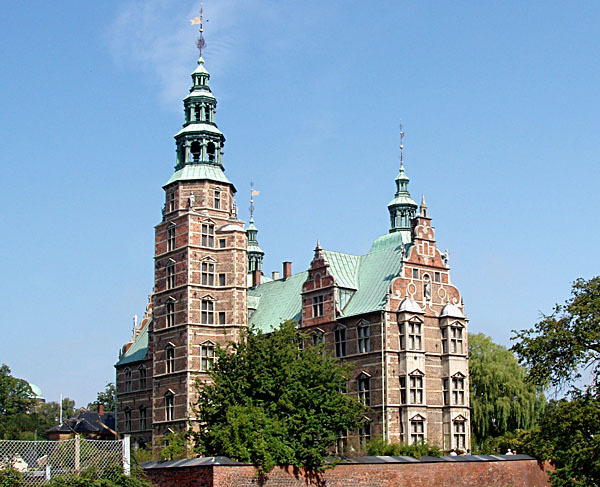
Rosenborg Castle, Copenhagen

Tourism in Denmark is a growing industry and a major economic contributor. Tourists spent a total of DKK 128 billion and the tourism industry employed 161,999 people in full time positions in 2017.

In 2018, tourists from Denmark's neighboring countries, Germany, Norway, and Sweden, comprised the majority of foreign tourists. That year also saw 30 million international arrivals. The number of overnight visitors has been slightly increasing since 2014; in 2018, 16.6 million tourists stayed overnight.

Denmark has long stretches of sandy beaches which attract many tourists in the summer, with Germany accounting for most foreign visitors. Swedish and Norwegian tourists often come to visit the lively city of Copenhagen, while many young Scandinavians come for Denmark's cheap and readily accessible alcohol.

As one of Europe's oldest kingdoms and the home of Hans Christian Andersen, Denmark is often marketed as a "fairytale country". The term is so ingrained, that it is still used in international news reports, especially when the news is of a nature contradicting the image, such as the Copenhagen riots or the Jyllands-Posten Muhammad cartoons controversy.

Denmark has a relatively large outbound tourism, with Spain as primary destination, accounting for 14% of all overnight stays abroad of four days or more in 2013. Turkey ranks as the primary destination outside of Europe at 7%.

Tourist arrivals of 2024 in %

== Copenhagen and Zealand ==
=== The capital ===
In 2004, Copenhagen Region had 136 hotels with a total of 4.9 million nights spent.

In 2018, Copenhagen recorded 9 million overnight stays. In 2019, Copenhagen Port had 348 cruise calls and 940,000 cruise guests.

Among the major tourist attractions are Tivoli Gardens, the Freetown Christiania and The Little Mermaid statue, all located in Copenhagen. A survey conducted by the newspaper Berlingske Tidende in July 2008 listed The Little Mermaid as the most popular tourist attraction in Copenhagen.

=== Surrounding area ===
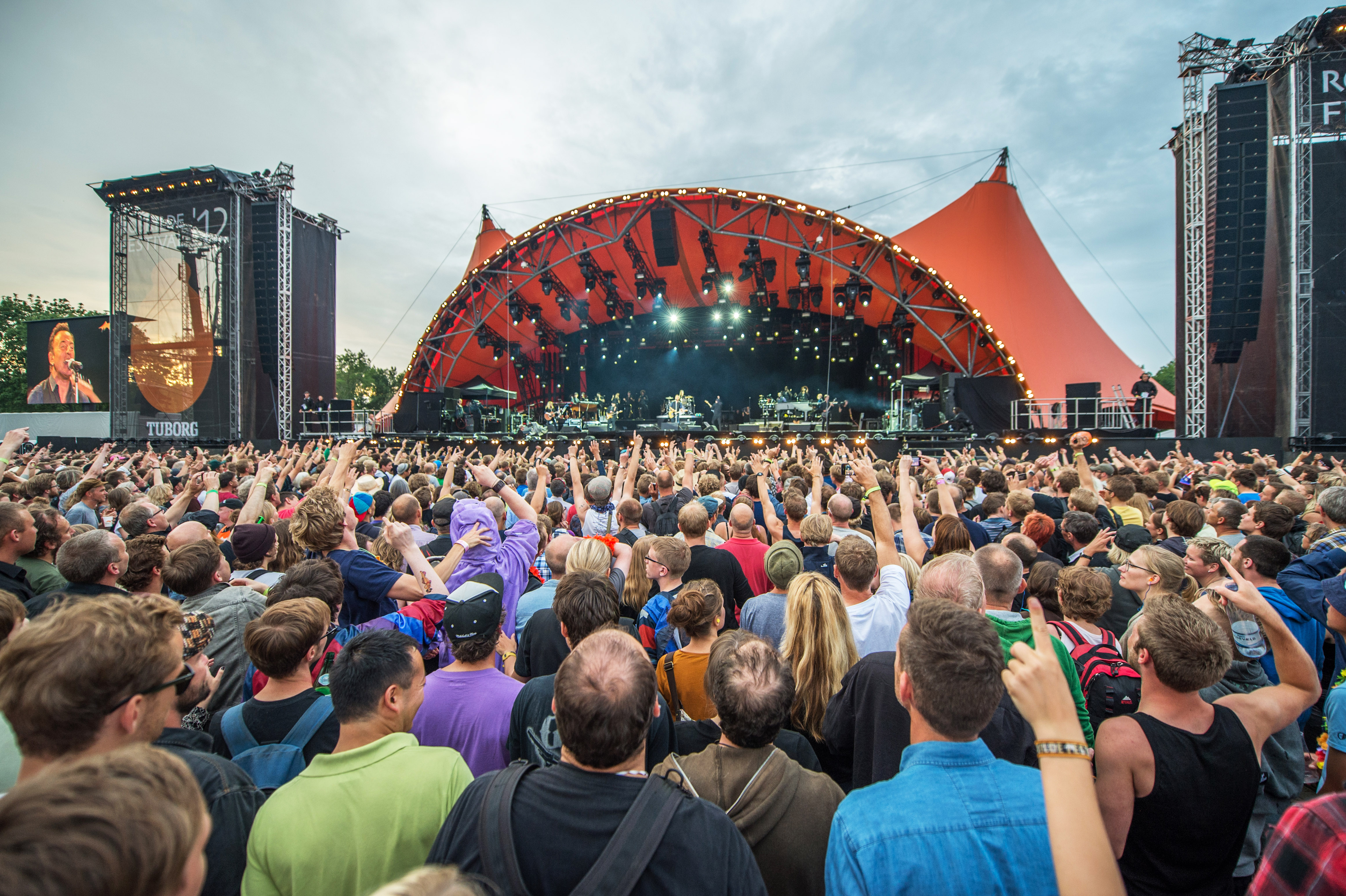
Roskilde Festival

Kronborg Castle in Helsingør is famous for its associations with Shakespeare's Hamlet. The Louisiana Museum of Modern Art, 30 km north of Copenhagen, is the most visited museum in Denmark and Roskilde Festival near Roskilde, 30 km west of Copenhagen, attracts over 100,000 guests every year.

=== Southern Zealand, Lolland, Falster and Møn ===
In view of its proximity to Germany, one of the most popular areas of Denmark for visitors is the South of Zealand and the neighbouring islands. Møn, with its magnificent chalk cliffs, Liselund Park and its sandy beaches is one of the main destinations. Falster has a number of sandy beaches including those at Marielyst. The area also has several tourist attractions including Knuthenborg Safari Park and Middelaldercentret both on Lolland, BonBon-Land near Næstved and the GeoCenter at Møns Klint.

== Bornholm ==
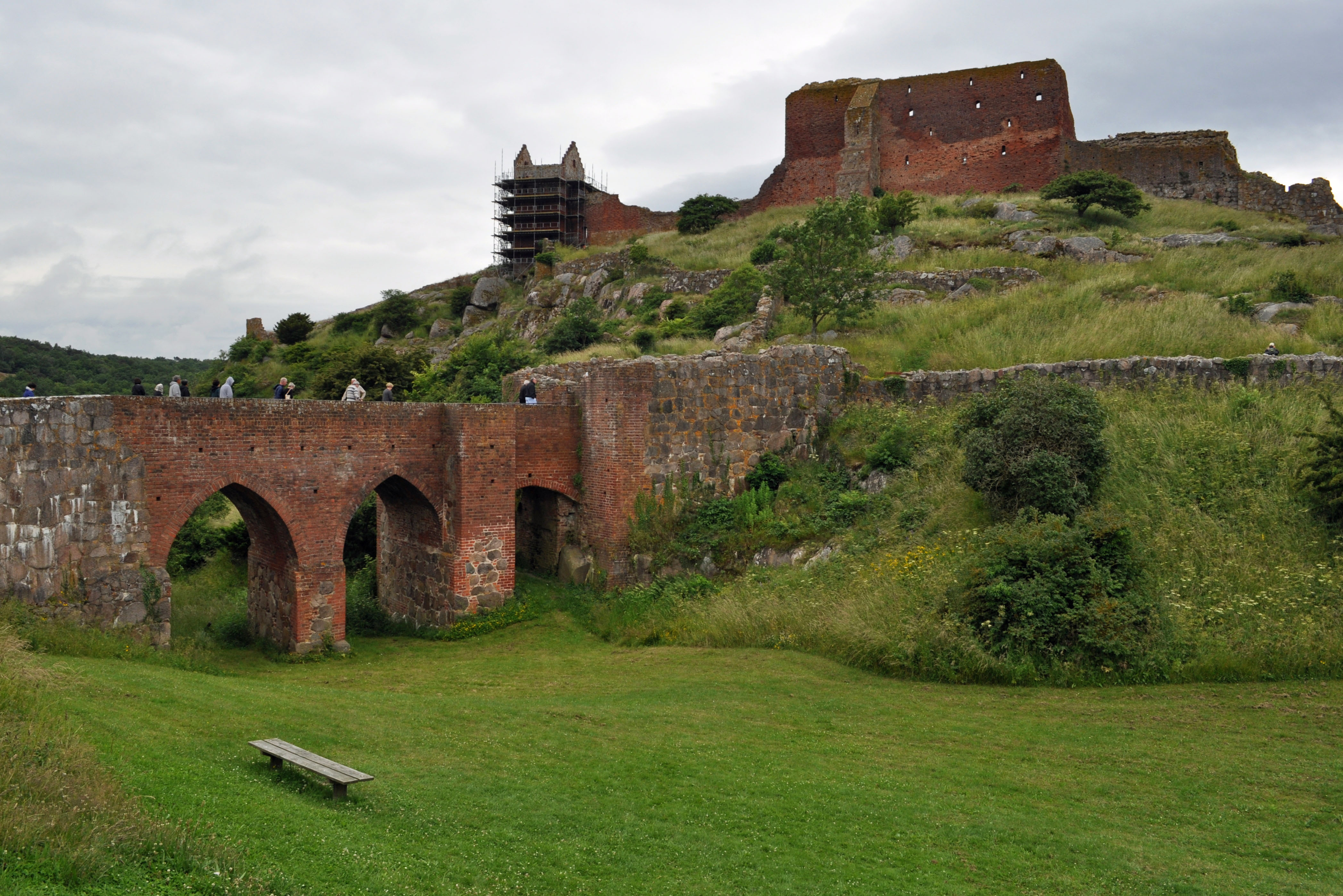
Hammershus.

The island of Bornholm in the Baltic Sea to the south of Sweden has a number of tourist attractions, including rocky seascapes, sandy beaches and fishing villages. Among these towns are Gudhjem, Sandvig, Svaneke and Rønne. The ruin of Europe's largest castle, Hammershus, is the island's most famous monument. There are ferry services to Bornholm from Køge near Copenhagen, from Ystad in the south of Sweden, from Rügen in the north east of Germany and from Kołobrzeg and Świnoujście in the north west of Poland. There is also an airport at Rønne.

== Funen ==
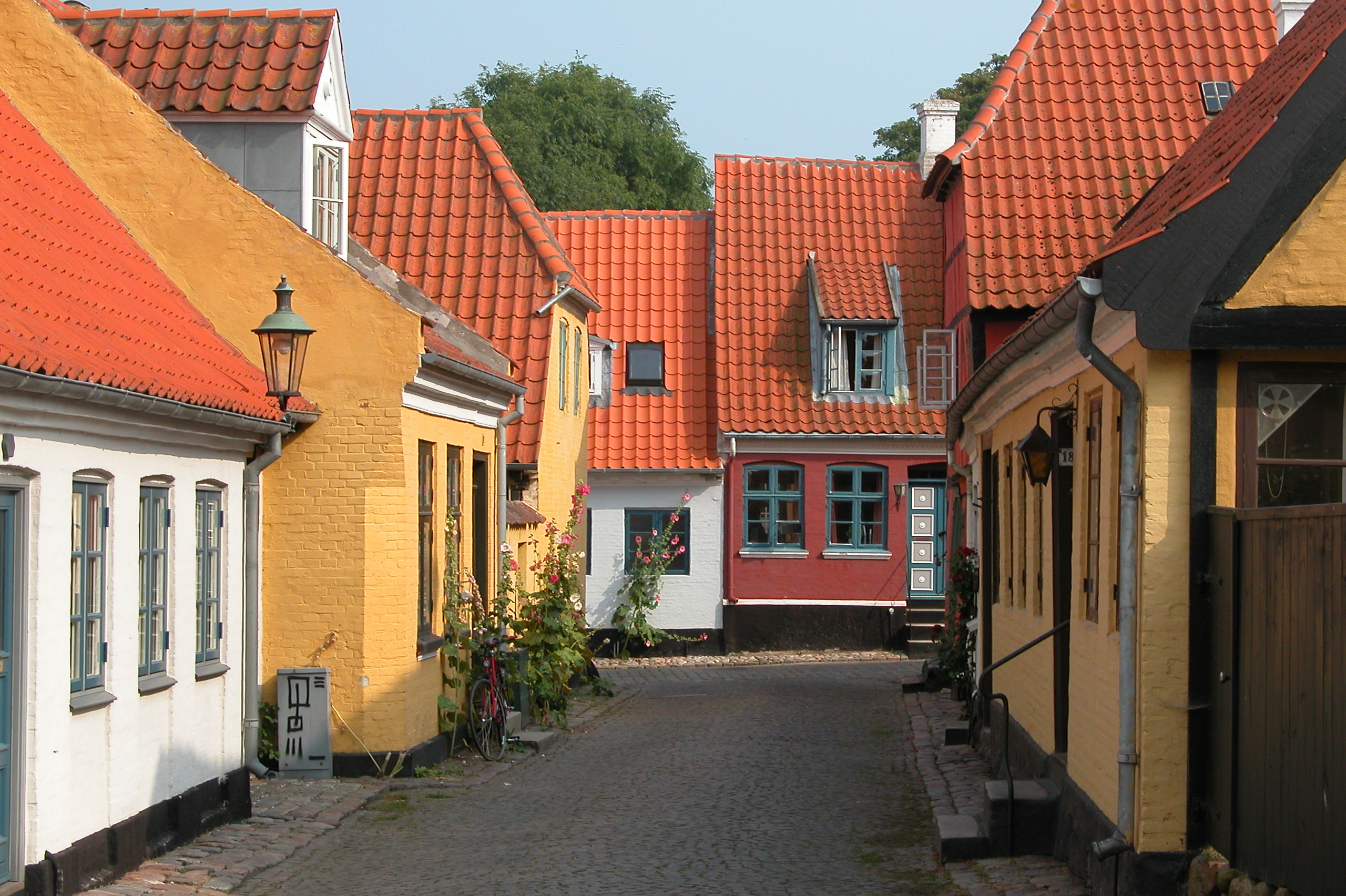
Ærøskøbing on the island of Ærø

Funen, linked to Zealand by the Great Belt Bridge, has strong associations with Hans Christian Andersen who was born in Odense. The small coastal towns of Fåborg and Svendborg are popular among the tourists, both as attractions in their own right and as centres for visiting the surroundings, particularly the castles of Egeskov and Hvedholm and the unspoiled islands of Thurø, Tåsinge and Ærø with their narrow streets and thatched cottages.

== Jutland ==
=== Major cities ===
The cities of Aalborg, in the north, and Aarhus, in the east, attract a considerable number of visitors, whether for business or pleasure.

Aalborg's 14th century Budolfi Church, 17th century Aalborghus Castle and the Jomfru Ane Gade (a lively old street close to the city centre) are major attractions.

Aarhus is amongst the top 100 conference cities of the World and has seen a large expansion in the hotel business, throughout the last couple of decades. The city is home to several of Denmark's top tourist attractions, including the museum village of Den Gamle By (the Old Town), ARoS Art Museum, Moesgård Museum and Tivoli Friheden, accounting for more than 1.4 million visitors annually. Other important tourist attractions are music festivals and shopping facilities. With one of the largest ports in Northern Europe, more than a dozen international cruise ships docks in Aarhus each year.

=== Regional attractions ===
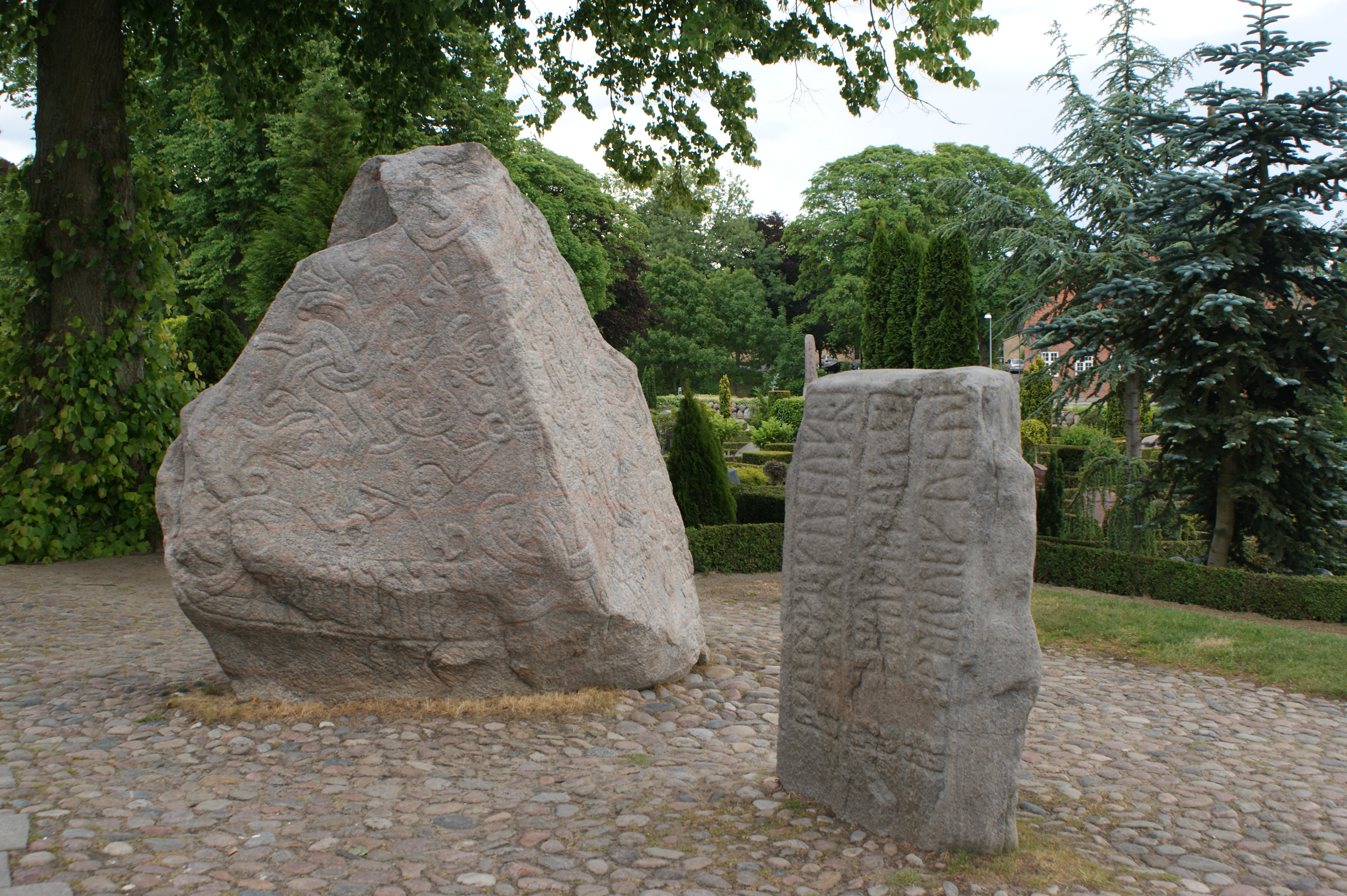
Jelling's runic stones

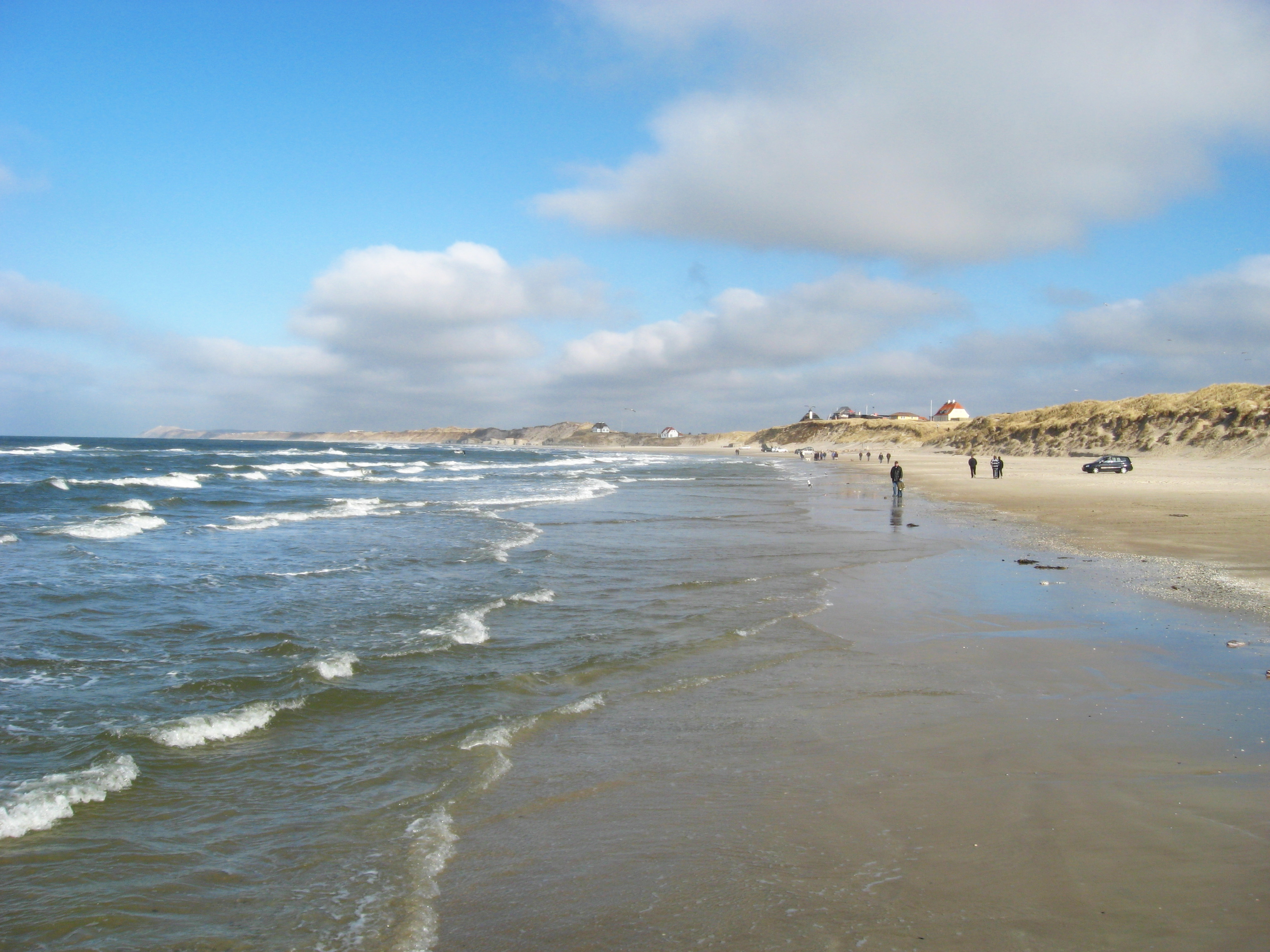
The beach at Løkken

Among Jutland's regional attractions are Legoland close to Billund Airport, the easterly village of Ebeltoft with its cobbled streets and half-timbered houses, Skagen in the far north known for its seascapes and artist community and the north-west beach resorts of Løkken and Lønstrup. The island of Mors, also known for its natural environment, attracts tourists to its Jesperhus Flower Park and to the cliff at Hanklit which overlooks the sea.

Jelling, near Vejle in the south-eastern part of Jutland, is a World Heritage Site, famous for its two great tumulus mounds erected in the late 10th century and its runic stones erected by King Harold.

Near Esbjerg on the west coast stands Svend Wiig Hansen's enormous sculpture of four chalky white figures gazing out at the sea. Known as Mennesket ved havet or Men at the Sea and standing 9 m high, it can be seen at several kilometers distance.

== Cuisine ==
The new Danish cuisine – part of the New Nordic Cuisine movement – has gathered international attention since 2004 with the publication of the New Nordic Cuisine manifesto. Notable restaurants serving the new Danish cuisine are primarily located in the Copenhagen area, including establishments such as Noma, Geranium, Restaurant AOC, and Den Røde Cottage. Outside of the capitol region, examples include Ti Trin Ned in Fredericia and Ruths Gourmet in Skagen.

Apart from the new Danish cuisine, Denmark has an increasing number of restaurants serving an international cuisine that has also attracted international attention. Many restaurants in the Copenhagen area have been awarded Michelin stars and in 2015, restaurants in Aarhus were the first provincial spots to receive this highly acclaimed rating. Many other restaurants throughout the country figure in other important food guides, including the Nordic White Guide.

The usual everyday fare of traditional Danish food for the citizens, comprises a lunch of smørrebrød on thinly sliced rye bread. On occasion, the sandwiches are richly garnished with onion rings, radish slices, cucumbers, tomato slices, parsley, remoulade or mayonnaise among others. For elaborate lunch meals, it is custom that the meal starts with seafood, usually fish such as marinated herring, smoked mackerel or eel, shrimp, or breaded plaice filets with remoulade, after which is served meat such as slices of roast pork or beef, frikadeller (meat balls), hams and liver pâté. The meal is often accompanied by beer and on occasions, shots of ice-cold snaps or akvavit are also served. In the evening, hot meals are usually served which include traditional dishes such as battered and fried fish, roast pork with red cabbage, pot-roast chicken, and pork chops. Game is sometimes served in the autumn. Steaks are increasingly popular.

== Transport ==
=== Air ===
Copenhagen Airport is the largest airport in Scandinavia. It is located at Kastrup, 8 km from central Copenhagen. It is connected by train to Copenhagen Central Station and beyond as well as to Malmö and other towns in Sweden.

For the west of the country, the major airport is Billund although Aarhus, Aalborg, and Karup also have smaller airports with regular connections to Copenhagen.

Motorways in Denmark

=== Rail ===
Denmark has a good national railway network. There are also frequent train services to Malmö and other parts of Sweden. Germany is connected both by rail services using the ferries from Puttgarden to Rødby and by services across the Flensburg-Padborg land border in the south of Jutland.

=== Road ===
Motorways are well developed across the country, the only tolls being on the major bridges (over the Great Belt and to Malmö).

=== Bicycles ===
Outside of the towns and cities there are often bicycle tracks parallel to, but separated from, the roads between towns. During the summer months, there are free "city bikes" stationed at various spots in the downtown area of Copenhagen and Aarhus. The idea is that anyone can take a bike from one of the spots, ride it to another spot and leave it there for the next person.

There are numerous national and regional bicycle routes throughout Denmark. They are all marked and include rest areas with benches and other necessities.

=== Sea ===
International overnight ferry services connect Oslo, Norway, to Copenhagen every day. Harwich, south-east England, used to be connected to Esbjerg, west Jutland three times a week. The Esbjerg–Harwich connection was closed in 2014, after nearly 140 years of operation.

There are also a number of ferry services connecting the Danish islands.

== See also ==
- List of museums in Denmark
- List of tourist attractions in Denmark
- Culture of Denmark
- Architecture of Denmark
- Art of Denmark
- VisitDenmark, the official tourism organisation
- Tourism in Finland
- Tourism in Norway
- Tourism in Sweden
