= List of tourist attractions in Denmark =

This list of tourist attractions in Denmark presents the 50 most visited tourist attractions in Denmark according to the annual survey published by VisitDenmark, the Danish national tourist organisation. Visitor numbers are from 2022.

== Scope ==
Not every attraction qualify for the survey and there are strict guidelines. Only commercial attractions aimed primarily at tourists and with a somewhat restricted access will be considered. Attractions not covered are for instance:

- Concert halls such as Copenhagen Concert Hall and Copenhagen Opera House
- Theatres such as the Royal Danish Theatre and the Royal Danish Playhouse
- Exhibition centres such as Bella Centre
- Natural sites. This includes places like Møns Klint, Grenen at Skagen Odde, Jægersborg Dyrehave and the four national parks.
- Freely accessible attractions such as Freetown Christiania and The Little Mermaid, both in Copenhagen.

== Top 50 most visited attractions in Denmark ==
| No. | Attraction | Type | Location | Visitor number |
|---|---|---|---|---|
| 1 | Tivoli Gardens | Amusement park | Copenhagen | 3,854,000 |
| 2 | Dyrehavsbakken | Amusement park | Copenhagen | 1,805,929 |
| 3 | Legoland | Amusement park | Billund, South Jutland | 1,700,000 |
| 4 | Copenhagen Zoo | Zoo | Copenhagen | 1,332,440 |
| 5 | Djurs Sommerland | Amusement park | East Jutland | 878,154 |
| 6 | Fårup Sommerland | Amusement park | North Jutland | 768,683 |
| 7 | Lalandia Billund | Aquadome | Billund, South Jutland | 750,000 |
| 8 | Copenhagen Botanical Garden | Green houses | Copenhagen | 685,626 |
| 9 | Louisiana Museum of Modern Art | Art museum | North Zealand | 612,992 |
| 10 | Rundetårn | Historic building | Copenhagen | 607,827 |
| 11 | Experimentarium | Science museum | Copenhagen | 545,873 |
| 12 | Lalandia Rødby | Aquadome | Lolland-Falster | 530,000 |
| 13 | Tivoli Friheden | Amusement park | Aarhus | 514,541 |
| 14 | ARoS Aarhus Kunstmuseum | Art museum | Aarhus | 514,332 |
| 15 | Royal Christiansborg | Historical building and museum | Copenhagen | 507,682 |
| 16 | National Gallery of Denmark | Art museum | Copenhagen | 498,505 |
| 17 | Odense Zoo | Zoo | Funen | 484,262 |
| 18 | Den Gamle By | Open air museum | Aarhus | 479,807 |
| 19 | Blue Planet Aquarium | Aquarium/Zoo | Copenhagen | 478,000 |
| 20 | Aalborg Zoo | Zoo | Aalborg | 473,769 |
| 21 | Givskud Zoo | Zoo | South Jutland | 453,604 |
| 22 | Ny Carlsberg Glyptotek | Art museum | Copenhagen | 449,147 |
| 23 | BonBon-Land | Amusement park | Zealand | 428,631 |
| 24 | Mosgaard Museum | History museum | Aarhus | 393,639 |
| 25 | Rosenborg Castle | Historical building and museum | Copenhagen | 325,609 |
| 26 | National Museum | Museum | Copenhagen | 304,985 |
| 27 | National Library: The Black Diamond | Museum | Copenhagen | 303,933 |
| 28 | Randers Tropical Zoo | Zoo | East Jutland | 303,291 |
| 29 | Lego House | Amusement park | Billund, South Jutland | 288,929 |
| 30 | Knuthenborg Safari Park | Zoo | Lolland-Falster | 282,000 |
| 31 | Egeskov Castle | Historical building and museum | Funen | 282,000 |
| 32 | Geocenter Møns Klint | Zoo | Møn | 260,870 |
| 33 | Jesperhus | Resort and flower park | North Jutland | 259,353 |
| 34 | Kronborg Castle | Historic building | Copenhagen Area | 253,416 |
| 35 | Fængslet | Historic building | East Jutland | 250,802 |
| 36 | Aquadome - Lalandia Søndervig | Aqyadome | South Jutland | 250,000 |
| 37 | Museum Østjylland, Ebeltoft | Historic building | East Jutland | 249,091 |
| 38 | Sommerland Sjælland | Amusement park | North Zealand | 246,000 |
| 39 | Aarhus Botanical Gardens | Greenhouses | Aarhus | 233,617 |
| 40 | Danish Architecture Centre | Museum | Copenhagen | 226,159 |
| 41 | Amalienborg Palace | Museum | Copenhagen | 216,260 |
| 42 | Cap Adventure | Watchtower and climbing park | Zealand | 211,322 |
| 43 | Nordsøen Oceanarium | Aquarium | North Jutland | 193,120 |
| 44 | Jingernes Jelling | Historic site | South Jutland | 187,979 |
| 45 | Frederiksborg Palace | Historical building and museum | North Zealand | 184,919 |
| 46 | Hans Christian Andersen House | Historical building and museum | North Zealand | 183,355 |
| 47 | Ree Park – Ebeltoft Safari | Zoo | East Jutland | 175,614 |
| 48 | Kattegatcentret | Aquarium | East Jutland | 171,694 |
| 49 | Skagebs Museum | Aquarium | North Jutland | 166,661 |
| 50 | Frilandsmuseet | Open air museum | Copenhagen | 163,015 |
| 51 | Viking Ship Museum | Museum | Roskilde | 159,761 |

== See also ==
- Tourism in Denmark
- List of museums in Denmark
