= Kersey =

Kersey may refer to:

- Kersey (cloth), a coarse cloth

== Places ==
Canada

- Kersey, Alberta

United Kingdom

- Kersey, Suffolk, a village in England

United States

- Kersey, Colorado
- Kersey, Indiana
- Kersey, Pennsylvania

== People ==
- Kersey (surname)
- Kersey Coates (1823–1887), American businessman, developed Kansas City, Missouri
- Kersey Graves (1813–1883), American skeptic, atheist and spiritualist

== Characters ==
- Kersey, a hare in the novel Rakkety Tam by Brian Jaques
