= Karai =

Karai may refer to:

== Toponym ==
- Karai, Iran
- Karai, Perak, Malaysia
- Karai, Sultanpur, a village in Uttar Pradesh, India

== Demonym ==
- Qarai Turks (Karāʾi, Qarāʾi) or "Black Tatars"
- Karai, caste subdivision among Mallar (caste), Urali Gounder caste, in India
- Karai, landlord class among the Guaraní people
- Karai, extinct Turkic language written in Hebrew script of Crimean Karaites

== Surname ==
- József Karai, Hungarian composer
- Karai Senryū (ja:柄井川柳; 1718–1790), Japanese poet, originator of Senryū form

== Cuisine ==
- Karai, also spelled Karahi, Indian cooking pot
- Karai, braised in Indian cuisine
- Karai, spicy in Japanese cuisine

== Fictional characters ==
- Karai, a major supporting character in the Teenage Mutant Ninja Turtles franchise
- Karai, name of Count Nikolai Rostov's dog in some translations of Tolstoy's War and Peace

== See also ==
- Karay (disambiguation)
- Karli (name)
- Karri (disambiguation)
- Qarai (disambiguation)
