= Karly =

Karly is an English feminine given name that is a feminine form of Carl and an alternate form of Carla. Notable people referred to by this name include the following:

== Given name ==
- Karly Gaitán Morales (born 1980), Nicaraguan writer, journalist, and film historian
- Karly Robertson (born 1989), Scottish figure skater
- Karly Roestbakken (born 2001), Australian football player
- Karly Rothenberg, American actress
- Karly Shorr (born 1994), American snowboarder

== Fictional characters ==
- Karly, a doll in the Groovy Girls line, by Manhattan Toy
- Karly, a character from the horror comic series Witch Creek Road

== See also ==
- Carly
- Kaly (disambiguation)
- Karby (disambiguation)
- Karsy (disambiguation)
- Karay (surname)
- Karl (given name)
- Karla (name)
- Karle (name)
- Karley
- Karli (name)
- Karlo (name)
- Kary (name)
- Karly, Gafuriysky District, Republic of Bashkortostan, Russian village
