= Carsey =

- Language: English

Origin
- Derivation: Habitational
- Region of origin: Kersey, Suffolk, United Kingdom

Other names
- Variant forms: Kersey, Kearsey, Keresey, Kiersey

Carsey is a surname. It originated as an American variant spelling of the English surname Kersey, a habitational surname from Kersey, Suffolk. The 2010 United States census found 692 people with the surname Carsey, making it the 33,087th-most-common name in the country. This represented a decrease from 723 (30,483rd-most-common) in the 2000 census. In both censuses, roughly 95% of the bearers of the surname Carsey identified as non-Hispanic white.

People with the surname include:

- Kid Carsey (1870–1960), American baseball player
- Jay Carsey (1935–2000), American professor
- Marcy Carsey (born 1944), American television producer
- Thomas M. Carsey (1966–2018), American political scientist

== See also ==
- Carsey-Werner Productions, a television production company co-founded by Marcy Carsey
- Carsey School of Public Policy at the University of New Hampshire, a school endowed by Marcy Carsey
- Karsy (disambiguation)
