= Svenningsen =

Svenningsen is a surname. Notable people with the surname include:

- Jeppe Svenningsen (born 1994), Danish footballer;
- Jesper Svenningsen (born 1997), Danish League of Legends player;
- Sigrun Svenningsen (1902–1971), Norwegian actress.
