= Karby =

Karby may refer to:

- Karby, Denmark, a village near Rakkeby on the island of Mors
- Karby, Schleswig-Holstein, Germany
- Karby, Sweden

== See also ==
- Carby (disambiguation)
- Rolf Kaarby (1909–1976), Norwegian skier
- Karey (disambiguation)
- Karly
