= Højriis Castle =

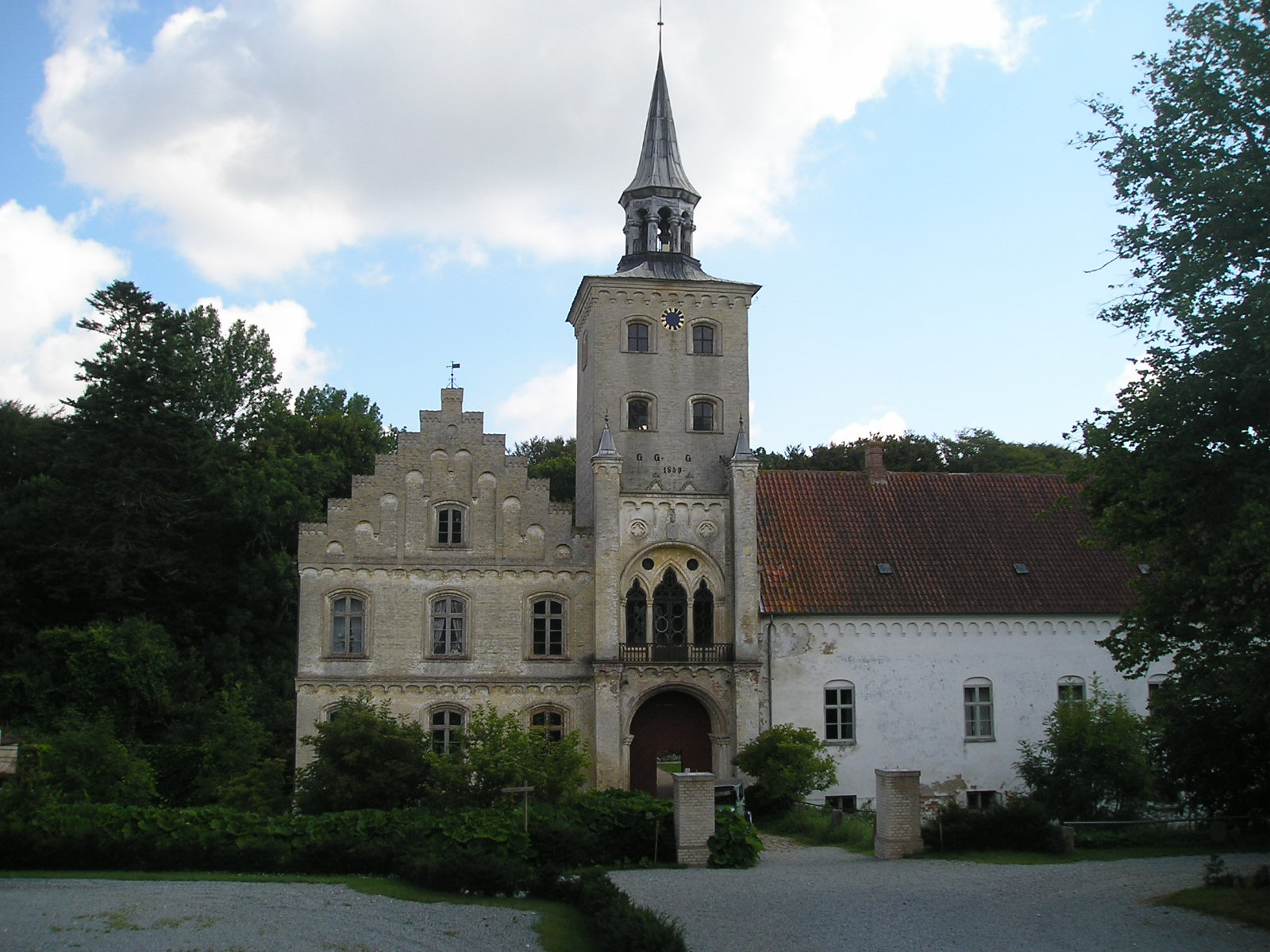
- Højriis' tower from 1859
- Interactive map of the Højriis Castle area

General information
- Architectural style: Historicism
- Location: Morsø Municipality, Denmark
- Coordinates: 56.7387°N 8.8055°E
- Construction started: 1859
- Completed: 1876

Design and construction
- Architects: Hans J. Holm, August Klein

Højriis Castle is a manor house located at Sallingsund, 7 km south of Nykøbing, on the island of Mors in the north-west of Denmark.

== History ==
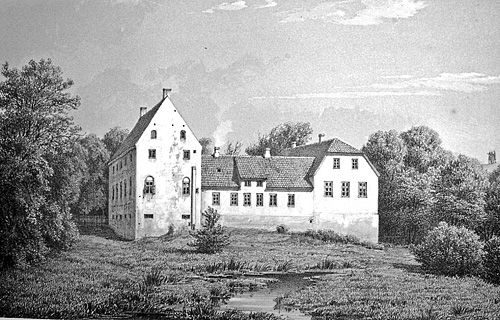
Højris in the middle of the 19th century, prior to the extensive alterations

Højriis traces its history back to the beginning of the 15th century. The first known owner is Johan Skarpenberg, a knight in the service of Queen Margrethe I, who owned several other estates in the area, including Spøttrup Castle in Salling on the other side of the water. He is buried at Viborg Cathedral.

The current castle dates from the second half of the 19th century.

In the 20th century Højriis was hit hard by the adverse times for Danish manors. The building fell into a state of despair and was left uninhabited from 1865. This situation lasted until 1994 when the property was acquired by the current private owners.

== Architecture ==
The castle is a three-winged complex built in the Historicist style which dominated Danish architecture at the time of its construction. The north-west wing and the tower were designed by Hans Jørgen Holm and built in 1859. The north-east and south-west wings were designed by August Klein and built in 1876. The complex is surrounded by moats.

== Højriis Castle today ==
Højriis is still under restoration. The estate comprises 434 ha of land.

== Owners ==
- (1397–1413) Johan Skarpenberg
- (1413–1434) Børglum Kloster
- (1434–1436) Thomas Pedersen
- (1436–1440) Kjeld Pedersen
- (1440–1465) Børglum Kloster
- (1465–1490) Anders Nielsen Banner
- (1490–1510) Erik Andersen Banner
- (1510–1535) Erik Eriksen Banner
- (1535–1555) Jens Thomsen Sehested
- (1555–1579) Anne Maltesdatter Juel gift Sehested
- (1579–1592) Malte Jensen Sehested
- (1592–1612) Claus Maltesen Sehested
- (1612–1636) Anne Nielsdatter Lykke gift Sehested
- (1636–1657) Erik Juel
- (1657–1664) Niels Benzon
- (1664–1670) Mogens Iversen Kaas
- (1670–1690) Poul von Klingenberg
- (1690–1723) Poul von Klingenberg
- (1723–1755) Ulrikka Augusta von Speckhan gift von Klingenberg
- (1755) Poul von Klingenberg
- (1755–1769) Frederik Hauch
- (1769–1776) Albert Winding
- (1776–1778) Frederik Hauch
- (1778–1799) Didrik Galtrup
- (1799–1812) Maren Nielsdatter Kortbech gift Galtrup
- (1812–1836) Anders Gjedde
- (1836–1863) Didrik Galtrup Gjedde
- (1863–1865) Gertrud Kristine Nyborg gift Gjedde
- (1865–1918) Carl Louis August Steensen-Leth
- (1918–1922) C.M. Bay
- (1922) Jysk Landhypotekforening
- (1922) J.C. Breum
- (1922–1924) Carl Jensen
- (1924–1946) Alfred Jensen
- (1946–1950) Enke Fru Grethe Jensen
- (1950–1951) Marie Luise Clason gift von Schwerin
- (1951–1990) Marie Luise Clason / Woldemar von Schwerin
- (1990–1995) Vibeke von Schwerin / Iris von Schwerin
- (1995-) Vibeke von Schwerin / Ib Smith
