= Qarai =

Qarai (Persian: قرآيي) may refer to:

- Qarai, Tehran
- Qarai, Zanjan
- Tatar, Qubadli, a village in the Qubadli Rayon of Azerbaijan
- Qarai Turks

== See also ==
- Karai (disambiguation)
- Karay (disambiguation)
