= John Degnbol-Martinussen =

John Degnbol-Martinussen (Nykobing Mors, 22 June 1947 – Frederiksberg, 23 September 2002) was Professor of international development at Roskilde University, Denmark, and an authority on international development policy.

== Background ==
Degnbol-Martinussen was educated in political science in his native Denmark, completing a PhD at the University of Aarhus and became Lecturer in Political Science at the same university in 1971. He stayed teaching at Aarhus a further ten years. Then in 1981, at only 34, he was appointed to a Chair in Development Economics and Political Science at Roskilde University, a new university where his organizational and research management skills helped create a strong undergraduate and later a postgraduate programme in International Development Studies. At the time of his death from a heart attack in 2002, he served as the Director of the Graduate Research School in the same institution.

== Aiding Denmark's development assistance ==
John Degnbol-Martinussen helped to shape Denmark’s progressive development policy, and its commitment to overseas development assistance, for more than two decades. Until 1991, he was President of a large NGO that placed thousands of volunteers in developing countries (MS - Mellemfolkeligt Samvirke, the Danish Association for International Co-operation). Active himself in politics as a member of the left-centre Social Democrats, his government positions included the chairmanship of the Danish Council for Development Cooperation, and he served three years as chair of the Danish Social Science Research Council.

Although Danish development research became threatened by the rightward turn in Danish politics in 2001, in 2002 he chaired the newly formed Danish Institute for International Studies (DIIS) which unified several government-funded research institutes in the sector. Until 1999 he was also a member of the Executive Council of the European Science Foundation, and advised UN organizations on many occasions, particularly UNDP and UNIDO.

== Scholarship ==
The author of over 130 publications, including five major self-authored books in English and eight in Danish. A talent for rigorous political analysis was evident in his path breaking work on the nature of the peripheral state in India and Pakistan, undertaken as doctoral research at the University of Aarhus, where he studied from the late 1960s.

While his approach was rooted in political economy, he incorporated neo-classical theories of trade and investment, and the ‘new institutionalism’ of incentives and transaction costs. An early interest in transnational corporations in India led to the publication of his Transnational Corporations in a Developing Country (1988). This was followed by Democracy, Competition and Choice (1995) which was a critical examination of local government in Nepal, while his Society, State and Market: a guide to competing theories of development (1997) received widespread acclaim as an accessible roadmap for students and practitioners – it has been published in at least six countries. Policies, Institutions and Industrial Development (2001) summarizes two decades of research into India’s industrial development experience. Aid: Understanding International Development Cooperation (coauthored with Poul Engberg-Pedersen, Zed, 2003) was published at a time when international development spending was being challenged.

From 1999 until his death, Martinussen headed a Roskilde research programme, GlobAsia, investigated the impact of globalization and regionalization on Asian countries – his own interest was again with India - a country that resisted external pressure to liberalize imports and capital flows for four decades - and the political fallout created by the increasing presence of transnational and foreign firms.

Poverty alleviation was always central to his projects; he believed, and fought for, continuing Danish assistance the regions and countries he worked in.
