= Kaly =

Kaly may refer to:

- Kaly (Brno-Country District), a municipality and village in the Czech Republic
- Kały-Towarzystwo, a village in central Poland
- Kały, Opole Voivodeship, a village in south-western Poland
- Kaly (film), a 2018 Indian film
- "Kaly", an unreleased song from the Red Hot Chili Peppers' 2016 album The Getaway
- Kaly (footballer) (born 2003), Domingos José Gabriel Bandeira, Angolan footballer

KALY may refer to:

- KALY-LP, a low-power radio station (101.7 FM) licensed to serve Minneapolis, Minnesota, United States
- KDSK (AM), a radio station (1240 AM) licensed to serve Los Ranchos de Albuquerque, New Mexico, United States, which held the call sign KALY from 1988 to 2013

== See also ==
- Kali (disambiguation)
- Karly
