= Carby =

Carby may be:

- Australian slang for carburetor
- Car-Mouth Kirby, often called Carby by fans, a transformation the titular protagonist uses in Kirby and the Forgotten Land

People and fictional characters with the surname Carby include:

- Hazel Carby, professor of African American Studies at Yale University
- Carn Carby, character in Ender's Game

== See also ==
- Karby (disambiguation)
