= Mors (island) =

Island in North Jutland, Denmark

Native name: Mors (or Morsø)
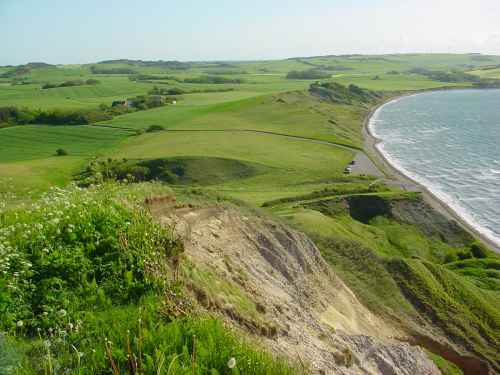
- Hanklit cliffs, Mors

Geography
- Location: Limfjord
- Coordinates: 56°47′N 8°43′E
- Area: 368 km^{2} (142 sq mi)

Administration
- Denmark
- Region: North Denmark Region
- Municipality: Morsø Municipality
- Largest settlement: Nykøbing Mors (pop. 9,198)

Demographics
- Population: 19,486 (2025)
- Pop. density: 55.5/km^{2} (143.7/sq mi)

Mors or Morsø (the latter more formal) is an island in the shallow sound called Limfjorden between Denmark's Jutland peninsula and the North Jutlandic Island. It has an area of 367.3 km^{2} and as of 1 January 2025, it had a population of 19,486. The main town on the island is called Nykøbing Mors. Geologically Mors is unique. Like the neighbouring island of Fur, it is known for its deposits of diatomite, locally known as 'moler' (mo-clay).

== Sights ==
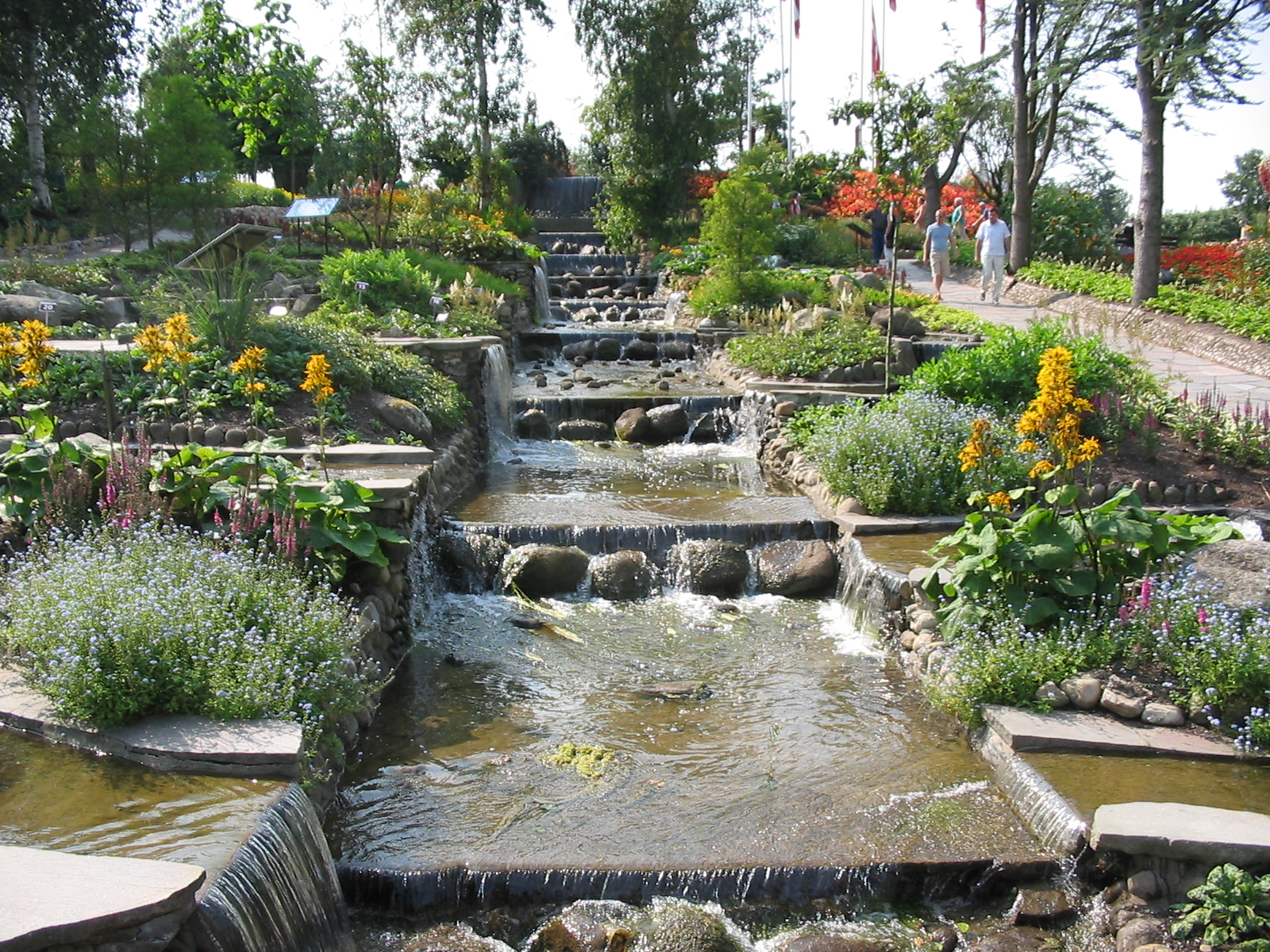
Jesperhus park

=== Jesperhus Flower Park ===
The largest flower park in the Nordic countries, Jesperhus, is situated in Legind Bjerge to the south west of Nykøbing. The park contains wide range of plants, including cacti, palms, a variety of roses and a lot of other colourful flowers. The park also has a butterfly reserve, aquarium, aviary, terrarium and hatching center.

=== Fossil and Mo-clay Museum ===
The Fossil and Mo-clay Museum (Danish: Fossil- og Molermuseet), located in northern Mors, boasts the largest collection of moler (diatomite) fossils in Denmark and tells the story of moler geology, the natural history of the island, and the relationship between the Danish people and moler including its manufacturing properties. The fossils include imprints of birds, fish, turtles, plants and insects found in the Fur Formation on Mors.

=== Hanklit ===
Hanklit is situated on the northern coast of the island and is a beautiful cliff face and tourist attraction. The cliff is c. 60 metres high and has several moler deposits. Several people search the cliff face for plant and animal fossils and there are also paragliders who use the nearby hills of Salgerhøj for takeoff.

=== Shellfish ===
Mors is known for its shellfish industries; specifically mussel and oyster fisheries and aquaculture. The Danish Shellfish Center (Dansk Skaldyrcenter), part of the Technical University of Denmark, is a research and dissemination center for marine science and aquaculture. The Danish Shellfish Festival takes place in Nykøbing Mors every year in June, celebrating the shellfish industries and Limfjorden traditions.

== Transportation ==
There is a bridge link to the island from Salling via the Sallingsund Bridge on the southeastern side of Mors, and another from Thy via the Vilsund Bridge on the northwestern side of the island. In addition to these two bridges, there are also ferry links to Thy from southwest Mors and from the north of the island. There is also a small airfield called "Morsø" with ICAO EKNM.

== History ==
Historical population
Year	Pop.	±%
1980	24,647	—
1990	23,814	−3.4%
2000	22,989	−3.5%
2010	21,800	−5.2%
2012	21,474	−1.5%

During the Jutland Peasant rebellion of 1441, Christopher of Bavaria, King of Denmark, approached the rebel camp at Husby Hole near St Jørgen's Hill in northern Jutland and sent word that anyone who left the camp and went home would not be punished for rebellion. The men from the island of Mors as well as those from Thisted left, for which they were afterwards called cowards and traitors.

== Sports ==
Mors-Thy Håndbold is the only professional sports team on Mors.

== Notable people ==
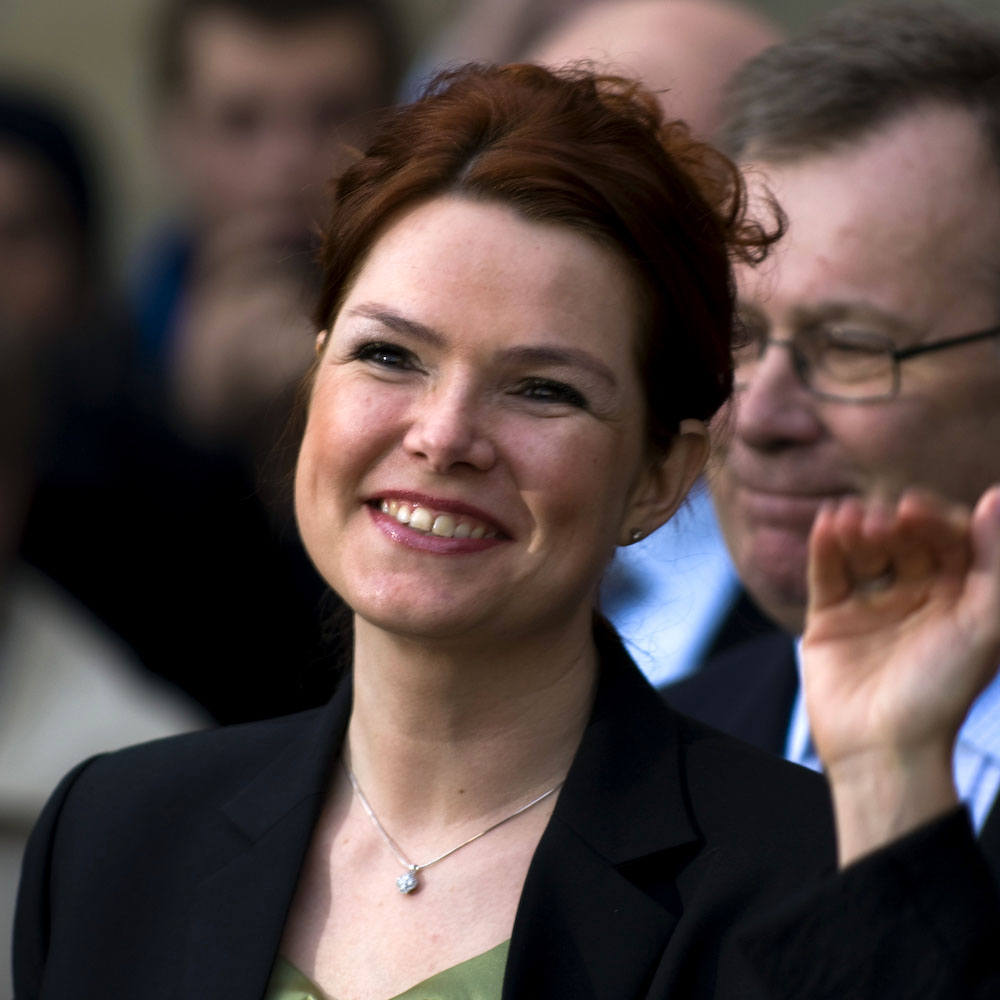
Inger Støjberg, 2009

- Peter Rochegune Munch (born 1870 in Redsted – 1948) was a leading historian and politician
- Aksel Sandemose (born 1899 in Nykøbing Mors) was a writer and journalist, famous for popularizing the Law of Jante
- Frode Jakobsen (born 1906 in Øster Jølby – 1997) a Danish author and politician
- Knud Sørensen (born 1928) a writer, poet and novelist; settled on Mors a surveyor in 1958
- Arne Rolighed (born 1947 in Flade) a politician, who served as minister of health 2000–2001.
- Asbjørn Riis (born 1957 in V. Hvidbjerg) a professional wrestler, actor and TV personality.
- Inger Støjberg (born 1973 in Hjerk, Salling) politician, former Danish Minister for Immigration, Integration and Housing, since 2022 leader of the political party Danmarksdemokraterne (Denmark Democrats).

== Attractions ==
- Dueholm Monastery
- Højriis Castle
- Jesperhus Resort
- Moler Museum
- Danish Støberimuseum
- Danish Shellfish Center

== See also ==
- List of Danish islands
- Morsø municipality
- Traditional districts of Denmark
- Asbjørn Riis
- Rakkeby
