= Karay =

Karay may refer to

- Karay (surname)
- Karay-a people of the Philippines
- Karay-a language, spoken by the Karay-a people
- Karay, a common dog name in Russia
  - Count Nikolai Rostov's dog in some translations of Tolstoy's War and Peace
  - The dog which played the role of Sharik in Heart of a Dog (1988 film)

== See also ==
- Karai (disambiguation)
- Qarai (disambiguation)
