= Karay (surname) =

Karay is a Turkish surname. Notable people with the surname include:

- Hacı Karay (1950–1994), Turkish drug trafficker
- Refik Halit Karay (1888–1965), Turkish educator, writer, and journalist

== See also ==
- Karay (disambiguation)
- Karey (disambiguation)
- Karly
