= Mogens Dahl Nielsen =

Danish cricketer (born 1972)

Personal information
- Full name: Mogens Dahl Nielsen
- Born: 12 May 1972 (age 54); Nykøbing Mors, Viborg County, Denmark
- Batting: Right-handed
- Bowling: Leg break

International information
- National side: Denmark

Domestic team information
- Years: Team
- 1999-2000: Denmark

Career statistics
Competition	List A
Matches	5
Runs scored	58
Batting average	19.33
100s/50s	–/–
Top score	49*
Balls bowled	84
Wickets	2
Bowling average	42.00
5 wickets in innings	–
10 wickets in match	–
Best bowling	1/16
Catches/stumpings	1/–
- Source: Cricinfo, 14 January 2011

Mogens Dahl Nielsen (born 12 May 1972) is a Danish former cricketer. Nielsen was a right-handed batsman who bowled leg break. He was born at Nykøbing Mors, Viborg County.

Nielsen made his List A debut for Denmark in the 1999 NatWest Trophy against the Kent Cricket Board. His international cricket debut for Denmark came in the 2000 ICC Emerging Nations Tournament against Zimbabwe A. During the tournament, he played two further List A matches against the Netherlands and Scotland. Nielsen's final List A match for Denmark came in the 2000 NatWest Trophy against the Durham Cricket Board. In his 5 List A matches for Denmark, he scored 58 runs at a batting average of 19.33, with a high score of 49*. With the ball, he took 2 wickets at a bowling average of 42.00, with best figures of 1/16.
