= Kersey (surname) =

Kersey is an English surname. It originated as a habitational surname from Kersey, Suffolk. Other spellings of the surname include Kearsey, Keresey, and Kiersey. The variant spelling Carsey may also be found in the United States. The 2011 United Kingdom census found 911 people with this surname. Notable people with the surname include:

- Clyde Kersey (born 1937), American politician
- Eda Kersey (1904–1944), British violinist
- Graham Kersey (1971–1997), English cricketer
- Hannah Kersey (born 1983), British woman with two wombs, gave birth to triplets in 2006
- Jess Kersey (1941–2017), American basketball referee
- Jerome Kersey (1962–2015), American basketball player
- John Kersey the elder (1616–1690?), English author
- John Kersey the younger (fl. 1720), English philologist and lexicographer
- Ken Kersey (1916–1983), Canadian jazz pianist
- Mark Kersey (born c. 1976), American politician
- Paul Kersey (disambiguation)
- Ron Kersey (1949–2005), American disco keyboardist and music producer
- Thomas Kersey (1847–1888), United States Navy sailor
- Alex Kersey-Brown (1942–2015), Welsh rugby player
