= Tyge Ahrengot Christensen =

Danish botanist and phycologist

Tyge Ahrengot Christensen (31 March 1918 in Nykøbing Mors – 17 January 1996) was a Danish botanist and phycologist.
