= Karsy =

Karsy may refer to the following places:

- Karsy, Lesser Poland Voivodeship (south Poland)
- Karsy, Łódź Voivodeship (central Poland)
- Karsy, Jędrzejów County in Świętokrzyskie Voivodeship (south-central Poland)
- Karsy, Opatów County in Świętokrzyskie Voivodeship (south-central Poland)
- Karsy, Masovian Voivodeship (east-central Poland)
- Karsy, Konin County in Greater Poland Voivodeship (west-central Poland)
- Karsy, Pleszew County in Greater Poland Voivodeship (west-central Poland)

== See also ==
- Karey (disambiguation)
- Karly
