= Karly, Gafuriysky District, Republic of Bashkortostan =

Karly Карлы
- Village
- Location within Bashkortostan Location within Russia
- Coordinates: 53°48′N 56°11′E
- Country: Russia
- Region: Bashkortostan
- District: Gafuriysky District
- Time zone: UTC+5:00

Karly (Russian: Карлы; Bashkir: Ҡарлы, Qarlı) is a rural locality (a village) in Mrakovsky Selsoviet, Gafuriysky District, Bashkortostan, Russia. The population was 78 as of 2010. There are 2 streets.

== Geography ==
Karly is located 36 km southwest of Krasnousolsky (the district's administrative centre) by road. Mrakovo is the nearest rural locality.
