= Jeppe Svenningsen =

Danish footballer (born 1994)

Personal information
- Full name: Jeppe Schøler Svenningsen
- Date of birth: 14 October 1994 (age 32)
- Place of birth: Nykøbing Mors, Denmark
- Height: 1.84 m (6 ft 0 in)
- Position: Right-back

Youth career
- FC Mors
- Horsens

Senior career*
Years	Team	Apps	(Gls)
2012–2014	Horsens	2	(0)
2014–2018	Thisted	58	(1)
2018–2021	Vendsyssel	49	(2)
2021–2024	Thisted	62	(2)
- * Club domestic league appearances and goals as of 23 April 2024

Jeppe Schøler Svenningsen (born 14 October 1994) is a Danish retired professional footballer who played as a right-back.

On May 17, 2024, 29-year-old Svenningsen confirmed that his body had given up and that he had decided to end his career.
