= Paul Kersey =

Paul Kersey is the name of:

- Paul Kersey (character), the main character in the Death Wish film series
- Paul Kersey (drummer), Canadian drummer in the rock bands Max Webster and The Hunt
- Paul Kersey (actor) (born 1970), American actor in the film Hulk
