= Rakkeby =

Coordinates: 56.7656°N 8.6217°E

Rakkeby is a small village on the island of Mors, northern Jutland, Denmark with 228 inhabitants (2011). Rakkeby is in the western part of the island, about 5 km east-northeast of Karby.
