= Nykøbing Mors =

- Town
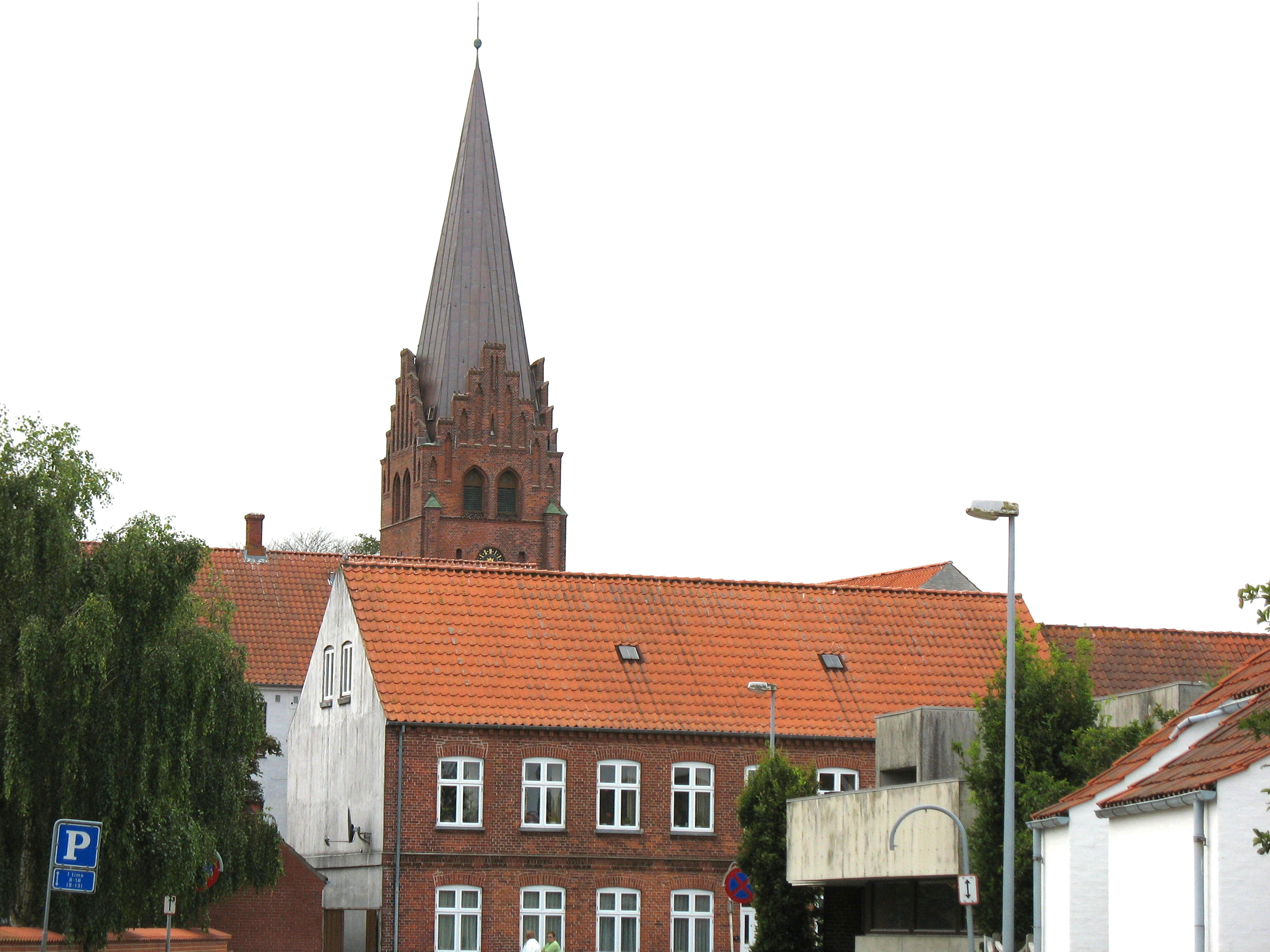

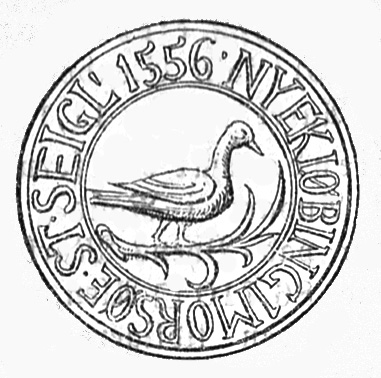
- Seal

- Location in Denmark Nykøbing Mors (North Jutland Region)
- Coordinates: 56°47′43″N 8°51′33″E
- Country: Denmark
- Region: Region Nordjylland
- Municipality: Morsø Municipality

Area
  - Urban: 6.4 km^{2} (2.5 sq mi)

Population (2026)
  - Urban: 8,866
  - Urban density: 1,400/km^{2} (3,600/sq mi)
  - Gender: 4,282 males and 4,584 females
- Time zone: UTC+1 (CET)
  - Summer (DST): UTC+2 (CEST)
- Postal code: 7900 Nykøbing Mors

Nykøbing Mors is the largest town on the island of Mors in the Limfjord in Denmark. The town received its charter in 1299 and has a population of 8,866, as of 1 January 2026. It is located in Morsø Municipality and belongs to Region Nordjylland.

== History ==
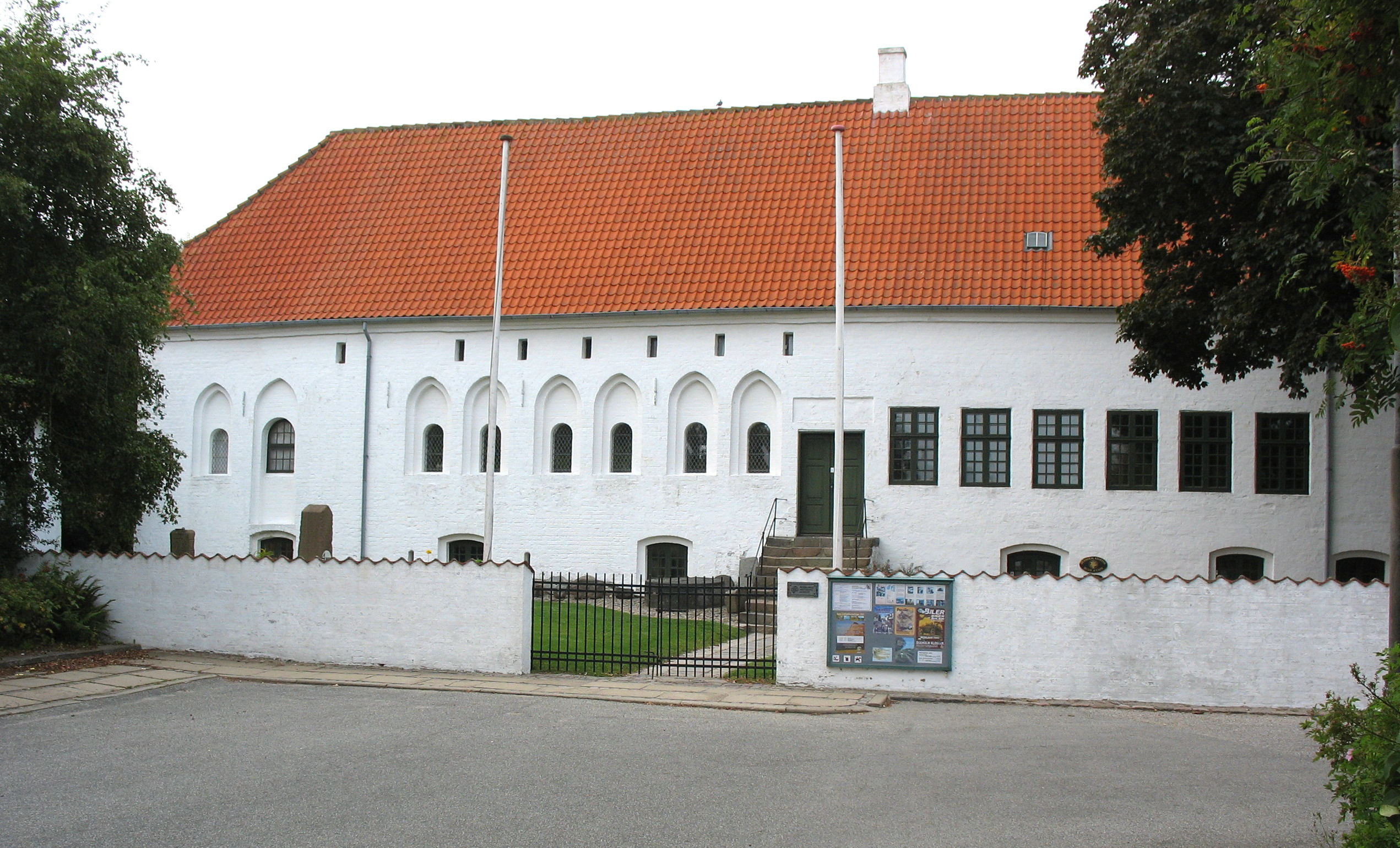
The former Dueholm monastery

The town received its charter in 1299. Nykøbing was the seat of the former Dueholm monastery, now part of the Morsland Historical Museum.

Nykøbing was the place of birth of Danish-Norwegian author Aksel Sandemose and the reputed inspiration for the fictional town of Jante, associated with the Jante Law, in Sandemose's novel A Fugitive Crosses His Tracks.

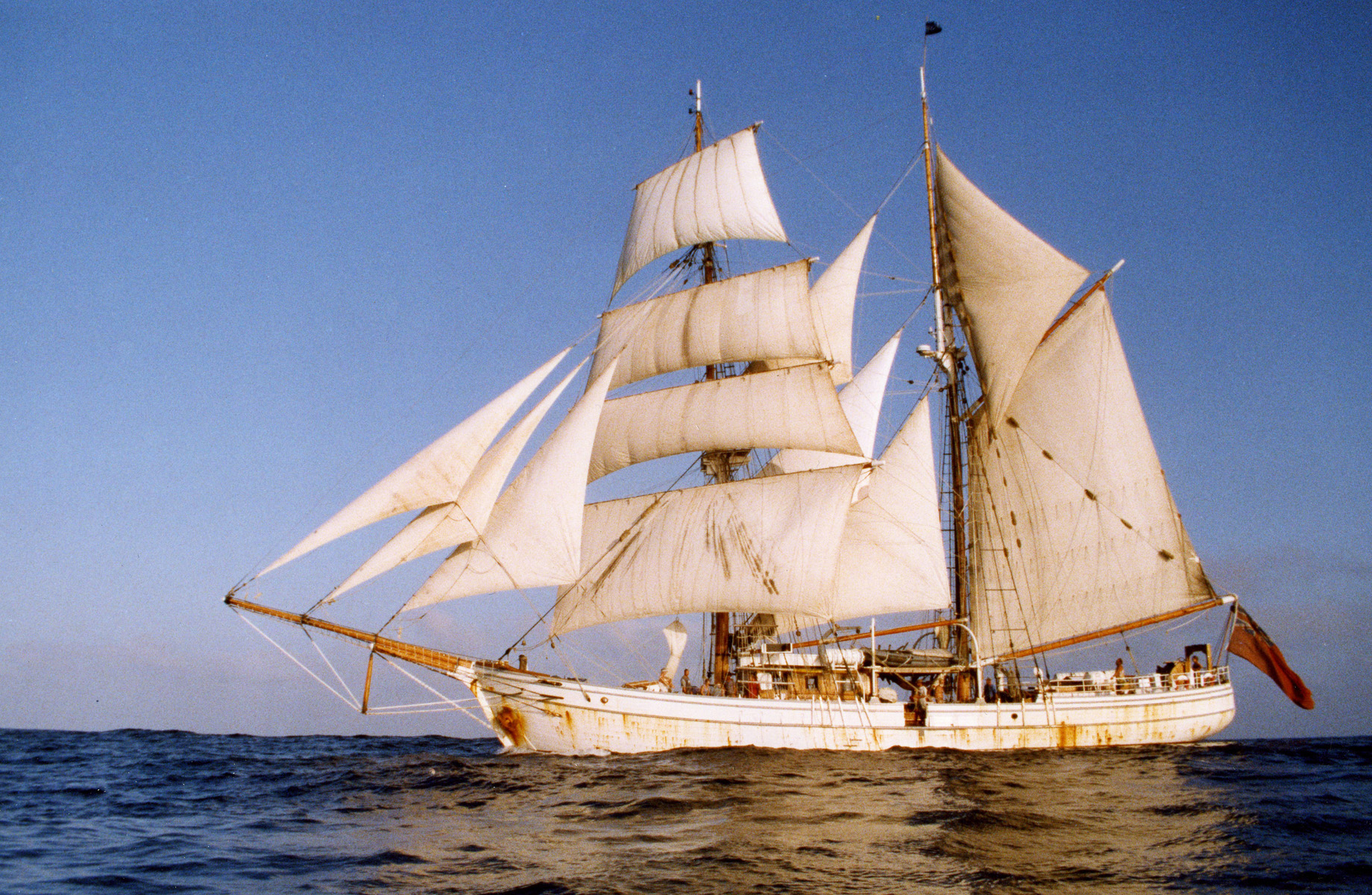
Søren Larsen, 2007

Søren Larsen and Sons owned a shipyard in Nykøbing Mors. There, the tall ship Søren Larsen was built in 1949. It is a brigantine. She is docked in Sydney, Australia.

== Geography ==
Nykøbing is located on the east coast of the island of Mors by the Sallingsund, a sound that separates Mors from the Salling peninsula on the mainland Jutland peninsula in Denmark. It is the largest town on Mors and the island's cultural center. Approximately half of the island's residents live in the area around Nykøbing. The town is located 6 kilometres (3.7 mi) north of the Sallingsund Bridge, which connects Mors with Salling across the Sallingsund. Nykøbing Mors is located 31 kilometres (19 mi) north of the town Skive in Salling and 30 kilometres (19 mi) southeast of the town Thisted in Thy.

== Sport ==
Located just outside the town on a spit is Nykøbing Mors Cricket Club Ground. The ground has in the past held Women's One Day International matches, including matches for the home national team.

== Notable people ==
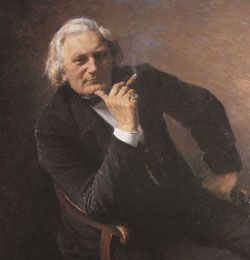
Mads Christian Holm, 1891

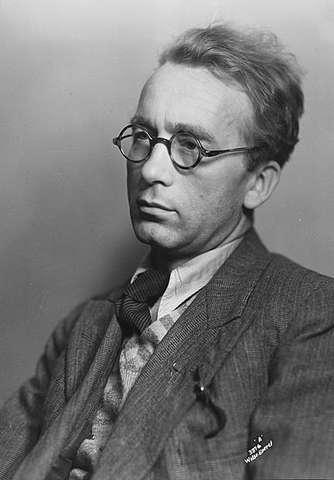
Aksel Sandemose, 1934

- Mads Christian Holm (1827 in Nykøbing Mors - 1892) a Danish shipbuilder and ship-owner who founded the shipping company D/S Norden
- Jens Lind (1874 in Nykøbing Mors – 1939) a Danish apothecary, botanist and mycologist
- Kirstine Smith (1878 in Nykøbing Mors – 1939) statistician and creator of optimal design of experiments
- Aksel Sandemose (1899 in Nykøbing Mors – 1965) a Danish-Norwegian writer
- Tyge Ahrengot Christensen (1918 in Nykøbing Mors – 1996) a Danish botanist and phycologist
- John Degnbol-Martinussen (1947 in Nykobing Mors – 2002) Professor of international development at Roskilde University, and an authority on international development policy
- Karsten Hønge (born 1958 in Nykøbing Mors) a Danish politician
- Mogens Jensen (born 1963 in Nykøbing Mors) a Danish politician and current Minister for Food, Fisheries and Gender Equality and Nordic Cooperation
- Mayianne Dinesen (born 1966 in Nykøbing Mors) a Danish radio personality

=== Sport ===
- Aksel Madsen (1899 in Nykøbing Mors – 1988) a long-distance runner, competed in the marathon at the 1928 Summer Olympics
- Tommy Troelsen (born 1940 in Nykøbing Mors - 2021) a former footballer, manager and TV presenter, 191 caps for Vejle Boldklub
- Morten Hedegaard (born 1972 in Nykøbing Mors) a former Danish cricketer
- Mogens Dahl Nielsen (born 1972 in Nykøbing Mors) a former Danish cricketer
- Thomas Dalgaard (born 1984 in Nykøbing Mors) a Danish footballer with over 320 club caps
- Jeppe Svenningsen (born 1994 in Nykøbing Mors), Danish professional footballer who plays as a right-back for Thisted FC
- Mads Svane, (born 2002) Danish handball player and European Champion
- Mads Kjeldgaard Andersen, (born 1996), Danish handball player
