= VisitDenmark =

Official tourism organization in Denmark

VisitDenmark is the official tourism organisation of Denmark.

The organisation is marketing Denmark as a tourist destination abroad, with a view to attracting more holiday visitors and conference delegates, who can generate increased revenue for the tourism industry. The marketing activities are carried out in close cooperation with the tourism industry and other integral players, for example through partnerships.

VisitDenmark is headed by a board, appointed by the Danish Minister of Business and Growth. The budget is 113 mio. kr. (€15 million.) 50/50 co-finansing from partners.

VisitDenmark's headquarters is in Copenhagen. Market offices in Norway, Sweden, Germany, United Kingdom, the Netherlands, Italy, the United States and China.

== Marketing ==
Marketing is targeted to four target groups—because their destination preferences match Denmark's strong destination selling points and because of their large growth potential.

1. Fun, Play and Learning: Families with young children who travel to child-friendly environments for family time close to nature and attractions.
2. The Good Life: Adults who prefer the quiet life with relaxation, nature, good food, walking, culture and events.
3. City breaks: People who like the metropolis atmosphere and being close to culture, sights, restaurants and shopping areas.
4. Business tourism: International meeting organisers who arrange large meetings, congresses and conferences.

== Facts about Danish tourism ==
- Total bednights: 45 m.
- Domestic bednights: 23 m.
- Foreign bednights: 22 m.
- Out of the total bednights is 15.7 m. cottage bednights (12 m. foreign bednights)
- Turnover: 82 bn. kr (€11 bn)
- Export revenue: 35 bn. kr. (approx. €5 bn) (4% of the total)
- Jobs: 119.000
- Tax income generated: 28,1 bn. kr. (approx. €5 bn.)
