= Jesperhus =

Family-owned resort

Coordinates: 56°45′47.23″N 8°49′7.22″E

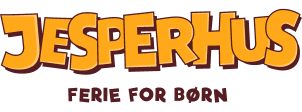
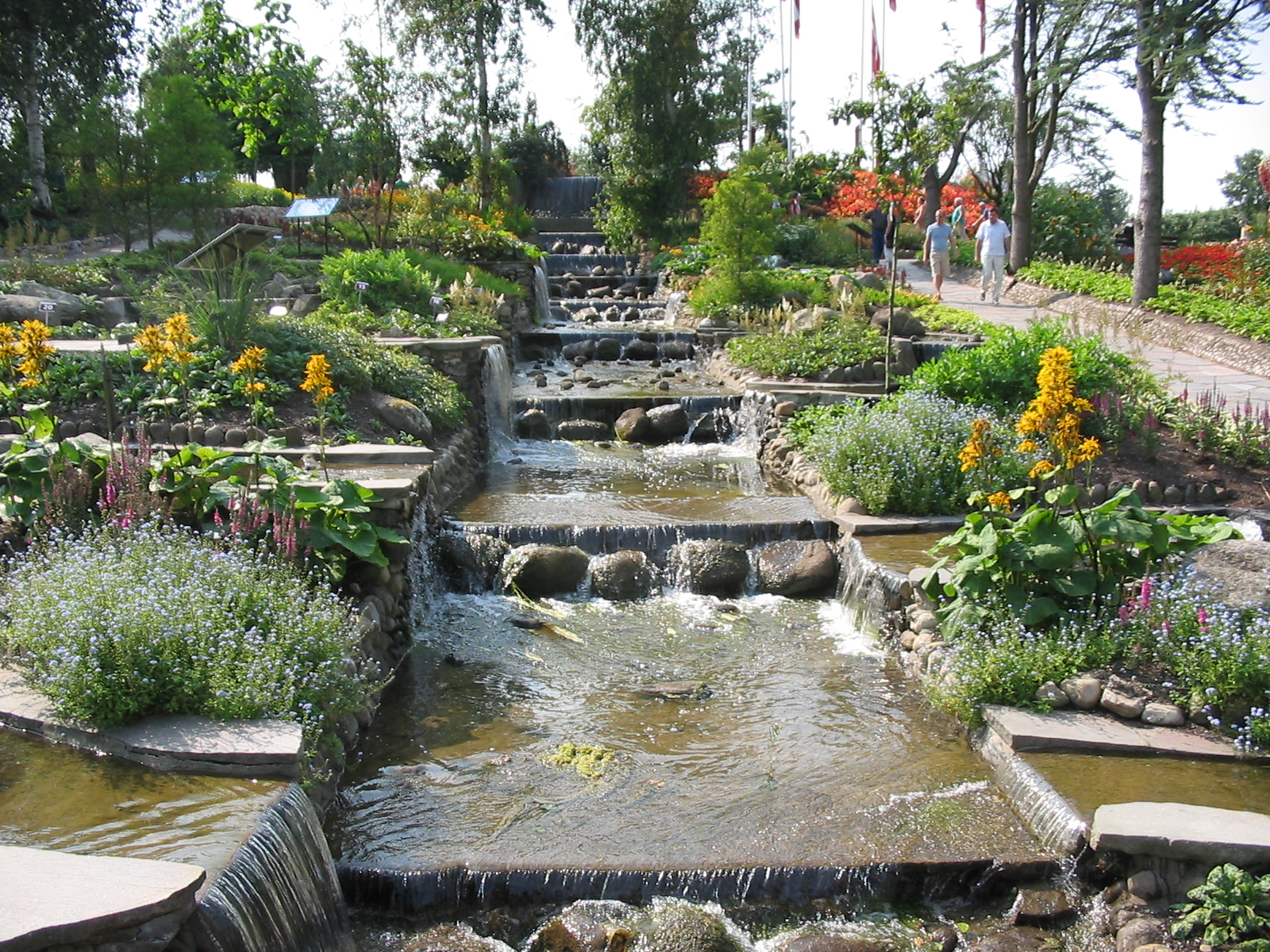
- The park in Jesperhus.
- Interactive map of Jesperhus
- Location: Nykøbing Mors, Denmark
- Created: 1960

Jesperhus is a 8-hectare (20-acre) family-owned resort around Legind Bjerge, south of Nykøbing Mors, Denmark. It includes a resort, a flower park, and an indoor zoo.

== Facilities ==
The resort has RV and tent camping, cabins, and holiday homes. Additional facilities include indoor and outdoor water parks and beach volleyball, as well as bowling and miniature golf.

The Flower Park is the largest such park in Northern Europe. It contains about 2 million flowers and plants, including herbs, cactuses, palms, a variety of roses, and many colorful flowers. The H.C. Andersen Fairytale Garden is based on 6 of the writer's fairytales. The characters displayed in the garden are made from flowers, houseleeks, and fiberglass. Walkways are lined with more than 100 perennial herbs. The Oriental Garden is designed with an Asian theme, and features palms and thousands of succulents. The Inspiration Garden is planted next to the longest waterfall in Denmark, and is intended to give people ideas that they might use in their own gardens.

JungleZoo includes about 3,000 square metres (32,000 sq ft) of indoor and 2,000 square metres (22,000 sq ft) of outdoor exhibits. It is home to some 450 animals representing about 125 species, most of which are allowed to range free within the large exhibit areas. It is divided into six areas by subject (a butterfly garden, terrarium, and outdoor facilities) and geography (Asia, South America, and The cave/Australia).

Jesperhus has its own pet and mascot, Jungledyret Hugo, which lives and works in the flower park.
