= Karai, Sultanpur =

Karai Karāi
- Village
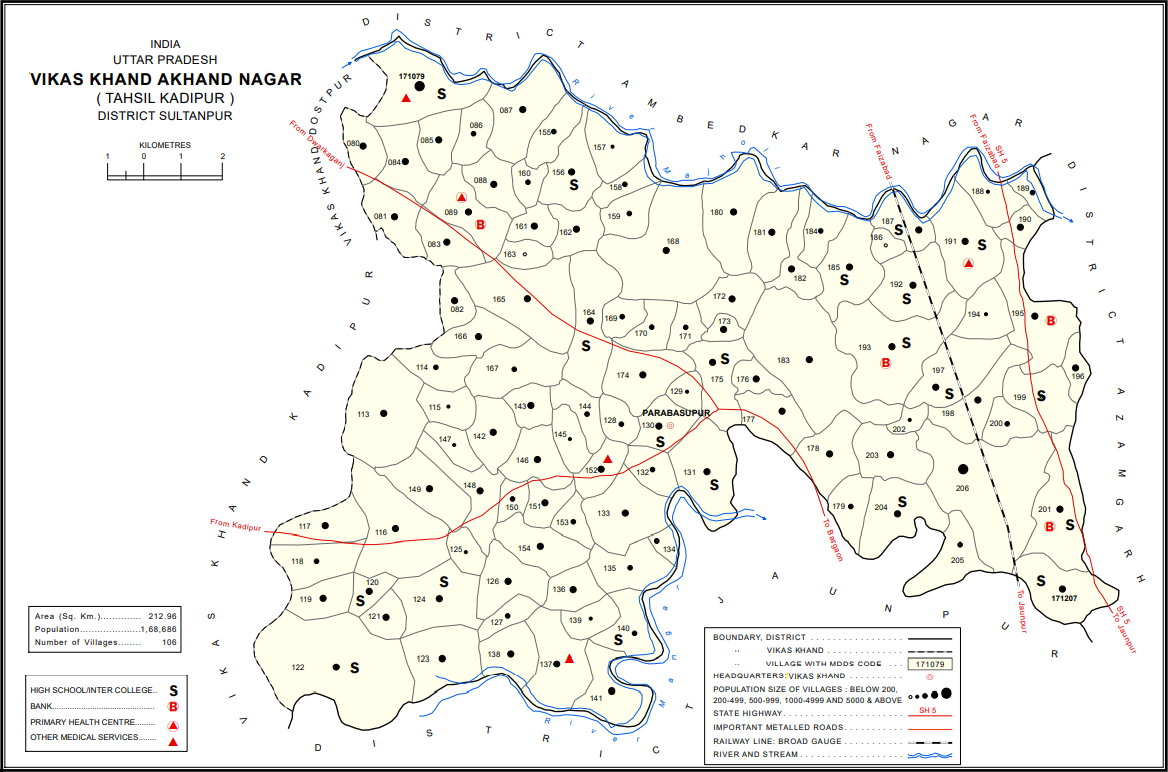
- Map showing Karai (#187) in Akhand Nagar CD block

- Location in Uttar Pradesh, India
- Coordinates: 26.246541°N 82.637718°E
- Country: India
- State: Uttar Pradesh
- Division: Faizabad division
- District: Sultanpur

Area
  - Total: 1.368 km^{2} (0.528 sq mi)

Population (2011)
  - Total: 1,399
  - Density: 1,023/km^{2} (2,649/sq mi)

Languages
  - Official: Hindi, Urdu
- Time zone: UTC+5:30 (IST)

Karai is a village in Akhand Nagar block of Kadipur tehsil in Sultanpur district, Uttar Pradesh, India. As of 2011, it has a population of 1,399 people, in 196 households. It has one primary school and no healthcare facilities and it does not host a regular market or a weekly haat. It belongs to the nyaya panchayat of Sajampur.

The 1951 census recorded Karai as comprising 1 hamlet, with a total population of 426 people (217 male and 209 female), in 71 households and 71 physical houses. The area of the village was given as 364 acres. 6 residents were literate, all male. The village was listed as belonging to the pargana of Aldemau and the thana of Dostpur.

The 1961 census recorded Karai as comprising 2 hamlets, with a total population of 451 people (218 male and 243 female), in 79 households and 75 physical houses. The area of the village was given as 364 acres.

The 1981 census recorded Karai as having a population of 766 people, in 110 households, and having an area of 147.31 hectares. The main staple foods were listed as wheat and rice.

The 1991 census recorded Karai as having a total population of 953 people (479 male and 474 female), in 127 households and 110 physical houses. The area of the village was listed as 143.11 hectares. Members of the 0-6 age group numbered 217, or 23% of the total; this group was 55% male (120) and 45% female (97). Members of scheduled castes numbered 301, or 31.5% of the village's total population, while no members of scheduled tribes were recorded. The literacy rate of the village was 34% (193 men and 57 women, counting only people age 7 and up). 200 people were classified as main workers (199 men and 1 woman), while 0 people were classified as marginal workers; the remaining 753 residents were non-workers. The breakdown of main workers by employment category was as follows: 161 cultivators (i.e. people who owned or leased their own land); 20 agricultural labourers (i.e. people who worked someone else's land in return for payment); 0 workers in livestock, forestry, fishing, hunting, plantations, orchards, etc.; 0 in mining and quarrying; 0 household industry workers; 0 workers employed in other manufacturing, processing, service, and repair roles; 0 construction workers; 1 employed in trade and commerce; 17 employed in transport, storage, and communications; and 1 in other services.
