= Raipur, Akhand Nagar =

Raipur Rāipur
- Village
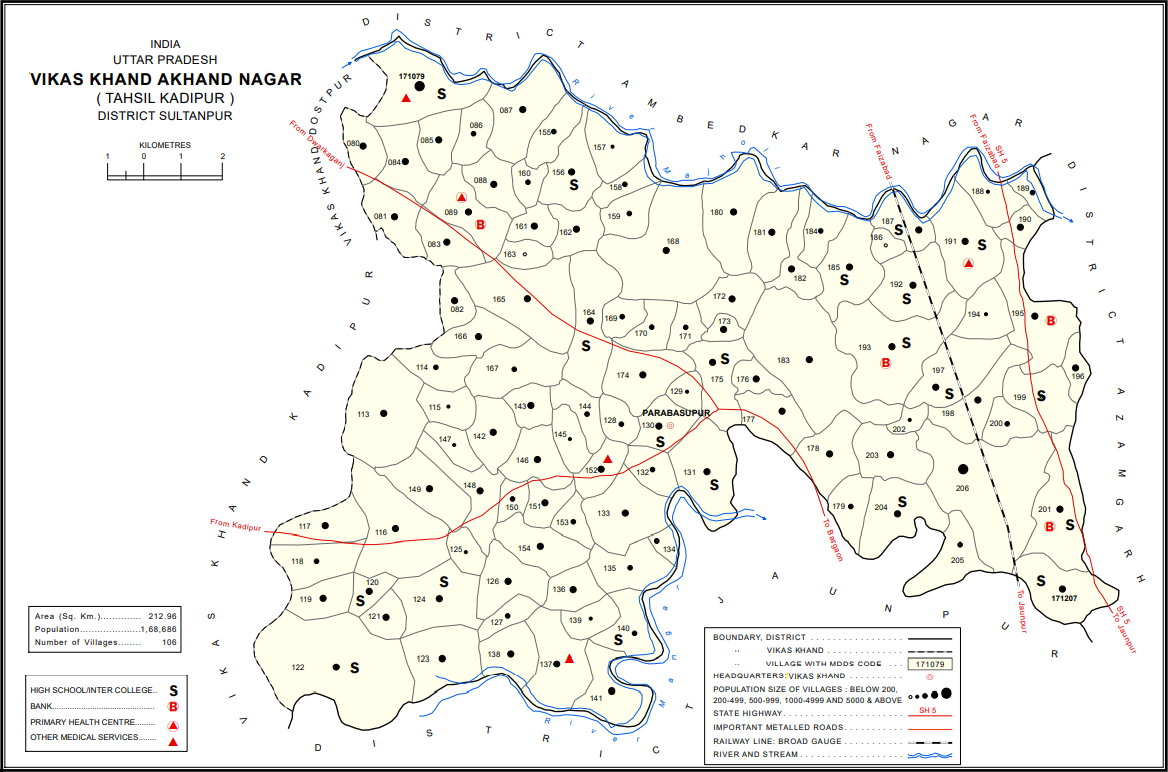
- Map showing Raipur (#185) in Akhand Nagar CD block

- Location in Uttar Pradesh, India
- Coordinates: 26.242576°N 82.626571°E
- Country: India
- State: Uttar Pradesh
- Division: Faizabad division
- District: Sultanpur

Area
  - Total: 2.702 km^{2} (1.043 sq mi)

Population (2011)
  - Total: 1,738
  - Density: 643.2/km^{2} (1,666/sq mi)

Languages
  - Official: Hindi, Urdu
- Time zone: UTC+5:30 (IST)

Raipur is a village in Akhand Nagar block of Kadipur tehsil in Sultanpur district, Uttar Pradesh, India. As of 2011, it has a population of 1,738 people, in 307 households. It has one primary school and no healthcare facilities and it does not host a regular market or a weekly haat. It belongs to the nyaya panchayat of Sajampur.

The 1951 census recorded Raipur as comprising 1 hamlet, with a total population of 690 people (365 male and 325 female), in 132 households and 122 physical houses. The area of the village was given as 673 acres. 46 residents were literate, 44 male and 2 female. The village was listed as belonging to the pargana of Aldemau and the thana of Dostpur.

The 1961 census recorded Raipur as comprising 3 hamlets, with a total population of 768 people (371 male and 397 female), in 142 households and 133 physical houses. The area of the village was given as 673 acres.

The 1981 census recorded Raipur as having a population of 1,111 people, in 186 households, and having an area of 272.77 hectares. The main staple foods were listed as wheat and rice.

The 1991 census recorded Raipur (as "Raypur") as having a total population of 1,399 people (710 male and 689 female), in 320 households and 286 physical houses. The area of the village was listed as 270.01 hectares. Members of the 0-6 age group numbered 294, or 21% of the total; this group was 49% male (144) and 51% female (150). Members of scheduled castes numbered 676, or 48% of the village's total population, while no members of scheduled tribes were recorded. The literacy rate of the village was 32% (247 men and 107 women, counting only people age 7 and up). 494 people were classified as main workers (332 men and 162 women), while 32 people were classified as marginal workers (all women); the remaining 873 residents were non-workers. The breakdown of main workers by employment category was as follows: 299 cultivators (i.e. people who owned or leased their own land); 187 agricultural labourers (i.e. people who worked someone else's land in return for payment); 0 workers in livestock, forestry, fishing, hunting, plantations, orchards, etc.; 0 in mining and quarrying; 0 household industry workers; 0 workers employed in other manufacturing, processing, service, and repair roles; 0 construction workers; 1 employed in trade and commerce; 0 employed in transport, storage, and communications; and 7 in other services.
