= Baramadpur =

Baramadpur Barāmadpur
- Village
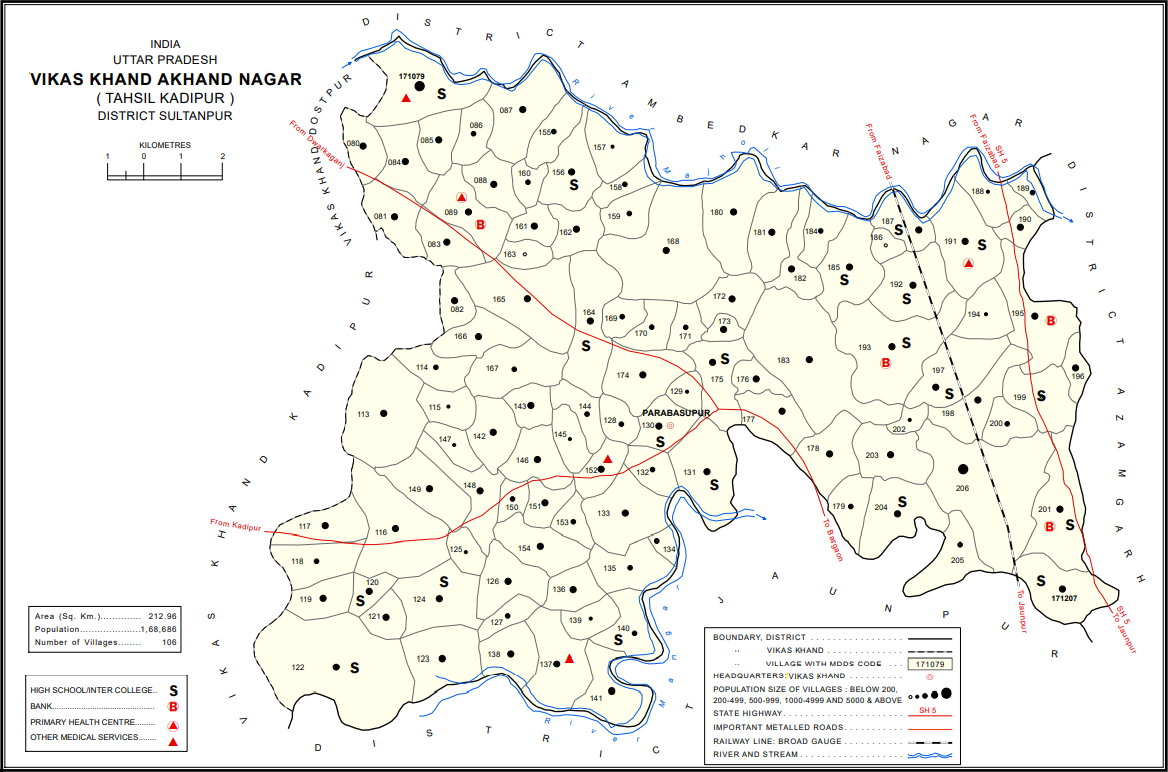
- Map showing Baramadpur (#191) in Akhand Nagar CD block

- Location in Uttar Pradesh, India
- Coordinates: 26.240391°N 82.658968°E
- Country: India
- State: Uttar Pradesh
- Division: Faizabad division
- District: Sultanpur

Area
  - Total: 3.506 km^{2} (1.354 sq mi)

Population (2011)
  - Total: 3,251
  - Density: 927.3/km^{2} (2,402/sq mi)

Languages
  - Official: Hindi, Urdu
- Time zone: UTC+5:30 (IST)

Baramadpur is a village in Akhand Nagar block of Kadipur tehsil in Sultanpur district of Uttar Pradesh, India. As of 2011, it has a population of 3,251 people, in 442 households. It has one primary school and one primary health centre and it hosts both a regular market and a weekly haat. It is part of the nyaya panchayat of Sajampur.

Located 58 km from Sultanpur, the district headquarters, Baramadpur is surrounded by the Majhui River to the north, Nawab Yusuf Road to the east, the Faizabad-Shahganj-Jaunpur Railway line to the west, and Kalwaribandh village to the south. Baramadpur is 20 km from Shahganj and 27 km from Akbarpur on Nawab Yusuf Road. Although the village is part of Sultanpur district, its post office is linked to Ambedkar Nagar district.

Shri Kashi Ram Rashtriya Inter College is a government aided school in Baramadpur which is affiliated to UP Board is the main center of education in Baramadpur.

New upcoming Purvanchal Expressway is going to provide Baramadpur a faster connectivity to Lucknow, Azamgarh and Gorakhpur (via Gorakhpur Link Expressway). In Baramadpur Purvanchal Expressway is intersecting with NH 135A which connects Baramadpur to Ayodhya and Varanasi. Also Purvanchal Expressway is crossing Shahganj-Ayodhya railway line in Kalwari Bandh (near Tulsi Nagar railway station) and Rail over bridge is under construction. Uttar Pradesh Chief Minister Yogi Adityanath visited Kalwari Bandh on Feb 8th 2020 to inspect Purvanchal Expressway construction status.

== Demographic history ==
The 1951 census recorded Baramadpur as comprising 2 hamlets, with a total population of 996 people (491 male and 505 female), in 158 households and 148 physical houses. The area of the village was given as 892 acres. 58 residents were literate, 52 male and 6 female. The village was listed as belonging to the pargana of Aldemau and the thana of Dostpur. It had a district-board run primary school with 63 students in attendance as of 1 January 1951.

The 1961 census recorded Baramadpur as comprising 4 hamlets, with a total population of 1,144 people (577 male and 567 female), in 186 households and 174 physical houses. The area of the village was given as 892 acres.

The 1981 census recorded Baramadpur as having a population of 1,733 people, in 252 households, and having an area of 361.40 hectares. The main staple foods were listed as wheat and rice.

The 1991 census recorded Baramadpur as having a total population of 2,141 people (1,049 male and 1,092 female), in 285 households and 271 physical houses. The area of the village was listed as 346.12 hectares. Members of the 0-6 age group numbered 437, or 20% of the total; this group was 50% male (218) and 50% female (219). Members of scheduled castes numbered 636, or 30% of the village's total population, while no members of scheduled tribes were recorded. The literacy rate of the village was 53% (606 men and 302 women, counting only people age 7 and up). 470 people were classified as main workers (463 men and 7 women), while 28 people were classified as marginal workers (all women); the remaining 1,643 residents were non-workers. The breakdown of main workers by employment category was as follows: 402 cultivators (i.e. people who owned or leased their own land); 27 agricultural labourers (i.e. people who worked someone else's land in return for payment); 0 workers in livestock, forestry, fishing, hunting, plantations, orchards, etc.; 0 in mining and quarrying; 4 household industry workers; 1 worker employed in other manufacturing, processing, service, and repair roles; 4 construction workers; 3 employed in trade and commerce; 5 employed in transport, storage, and communications; and 24 in other services.
