= Ramnagar, Akhand Nagar =

Ramnagar Rāmnagar
- Village
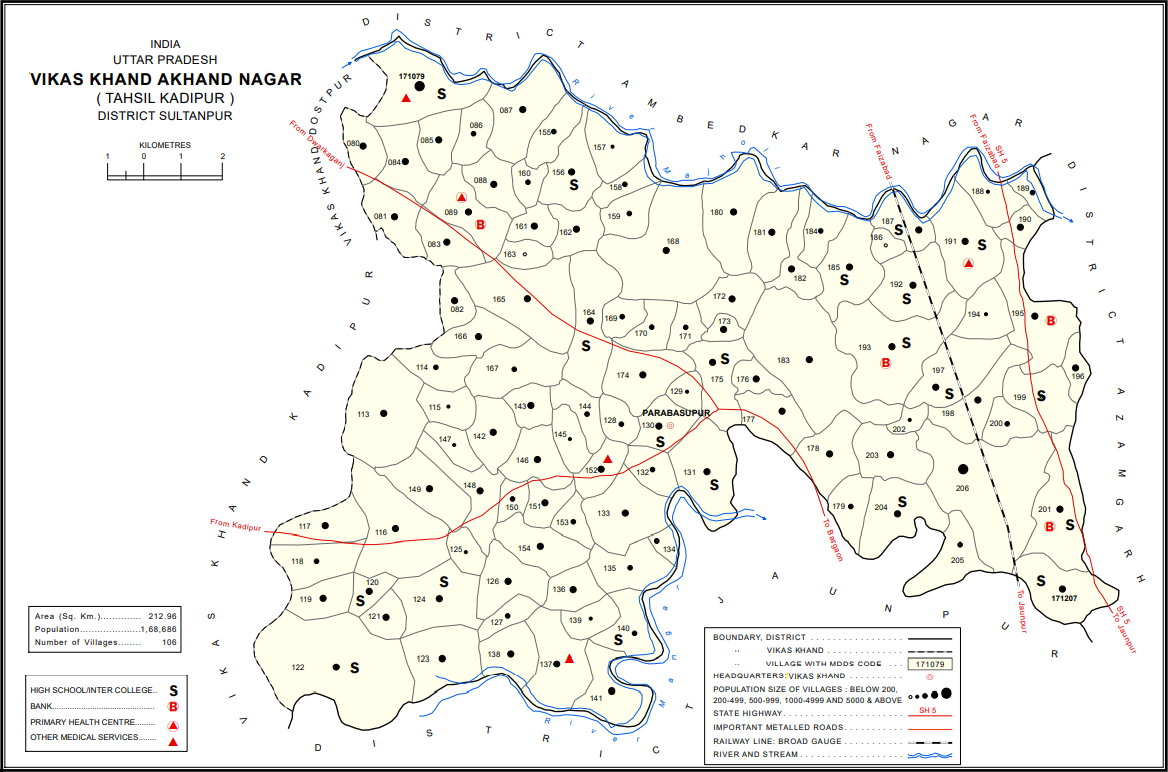
- Map showing Ramnagar (#184) in Akhand Nagar CD block

- Location in Uttar Pradesh, India
- Coordinates: 26.247119°N 82.622252°E
- Country: India
- State: Uttar Pradesh
- Division: Faizabad division
- District: Sultanpur

Area
  - Total: 1.148 km^{2} (0.443 sq mi)

Population (2011)
  - Total: 983
  - Density: 856/km^{2} (2,220/sq mi)

Languages
  - Official: Hindi, Urdu
- Time zone: UTC+5:30 (IST)

Ramnagar is a village in Akhand Nagar block of Kadipur tehsil in Sultanpur district, Uttar Pradesh, India. As of 2011, it has a population of 983 people, in 144 households. It has no healthcare facilities and it does not host a regular market or a weekly haat. It belongs to the nyaya panchayat of Sajampur.

The 1951 census recorded Ramnagar as comprising 1 hamlet, with a total population of 340 people (162 male and 178 female), in 64 households and 55 physical houses. The area of the village was given as 316 acres. 25 residents were literate, 22 male and 3 female. The village was listed as belonging to the pargana of Aldemau and the thana of Dostpur.

The 1961 census recorded Ramnagar as comprising 1 hamlet, with a total population of 370 people (185 male and 185 female), in 67 households and 61 physical houses. The area of the village was given as 316 acres.

The 1981 census recorded Ramnagar as having a population of 523 people, in 86 households, and having an area of 127.89 hectares. The main staple foods were listed as wheat and rice.

The 1991 census recorded Ramnagar as having a total population of 661 people (342 male and 319 female), in 97 households and 95 physical houses. The area of the village was listed as 115.43 hectares. Members of the 0-6 age group numbered 131, or 20% of the total; this group was 53% male (70) and 47% female (61). Members of scheduled castes numbered 285, or 43% of the village's total population, while no members of scheduled tribes were recorded. The literacy rate of the village was 39% (144 men and 62 women, counting only people age 7 and up). 231 people were classified as main workers (167 men and 64 women), while 33 people were classified as marginal workers (all women); the remaining 397 residents were non-workers. The breakdown of main workers by employment category was as follows: 122 cultivators (i.e. people who owned or leased their own land); 93 agricultural labourers (i.e. people who worked someone else's land in return for payment); 0 workers in livestock, forestry, fishing, hunting, plantations, orchards, etc.; 0 in mining and quarrying; 0 household industry workers; 4 workers employed in other manufacturing, processing, service, and repair roles; 1 construction worker; 2 employed in trade and commerce; 0 employed in transport, storage, and communications; and 9 in other services.
