= Muradabad, Sultanpur =

Muradabad Murādābād
- Village
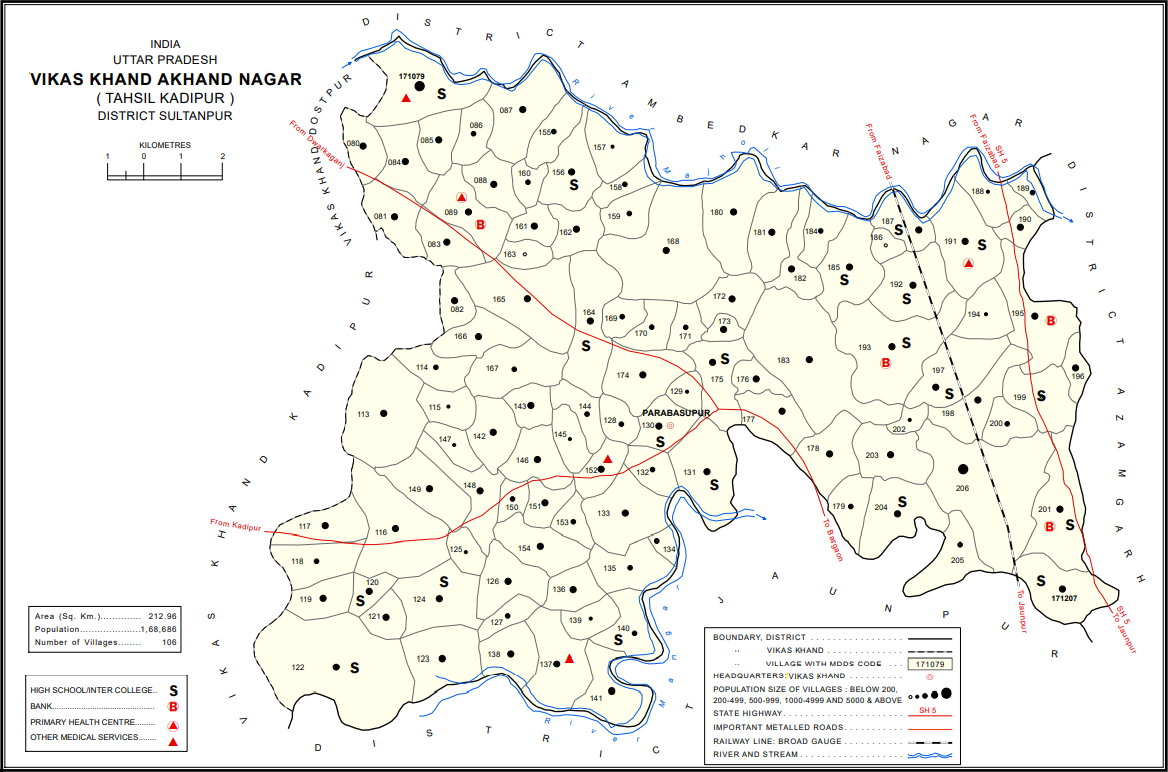
- Map showing Muradabad (#190) in Akhand Nagar CD block

- Location in Uttar Pradesh, India
- Coordinates: 26.23979°N 82.67192°E
- Country: India
- State: Uttar Pradesh
- Division: Faizabad division
- District: Sultanpur

Area
  - Total: 1.613 km^{2} (0.623 sq mi)

Population (2011)
  - Total: 1,543
  - Density: 956.6/km^{2} (2,478/sq mi)

Languages
  - Official: Hindi, Urdu
- Time zone: UTC+5:30 (IST)

Muradabad is a village in Akhand Nagar block of Kadipur tehsil in Sultanpur district, Uttar Pradesh, India. As of 2011, it has a population of 1,543 people, in 238 households. It has one primary school and no healthcare facilities and it hosts both a regular market and a weekly haat. It belongs to the nyaya panchayat of Sajampur.

The 1951 census recorded Muradabad (as "Moradabad") as comprising 2 hamlets, with a total population of 484 people (254 male and 230 female), in 83 households and 81 physical houses. The area of the village was given as 435 acres. 55 residents were literate, all male. The village was listed as belonging to the pargana of Aldemau and the thana of Dostpur.

The 1961 census recorded Muradabad (as "Moradabad") as comprising 2 hamlets, with a total population of 555 people (254 male and 301 female), in 93 households and 87 physical houses. The area of the village was given as 435 acres.

The 1981 census recorded Muradabad as having a population of 870 people, in 133 households, and having an area of 172.00 hectares. The main staple foods were listed as wheat and rice.

The 1991 census recorded Muradabad as having a total population of 1,117 people (583 male and 534 female), in 143 households and 136 physical houses. The area of the village was listed as 161.10 hectares. Members of the 0-6 age group numbered 274, or 24.5% of the total; this group was 48% male (131) and 52% female (143). Members of scheduled castes numbered 99, or 8% of the village's total population, while no members of scheduled tribes were recorded. The literacy rate of the village was 55% (336 men and 130 women, counting only people age 7 and up). 297 people were classified as main workers (264 men and 33 women), while 0 people were classified as marginal workers; the remaining 820 residents were non-workers. The breakdown of main workers by employment category was as follows: 165 cultivators (i.e. people who owned or leased their own land); 70 agricultural labourers (i.e. people who worked someone else's land in return for payment); 0 workers in livestock, forestry, fishing, hunting, plantations, orchards, etc.; 0 in mining and quarrying; 1 household industry worker; 1 worker employed in other manufacturing, processing, service, and repair roles; 2 construction workers; 5 employed in trade and commerce; 3 employed in transport, storage, and communications; and 50 in other services.
