= Akhand Nagar =

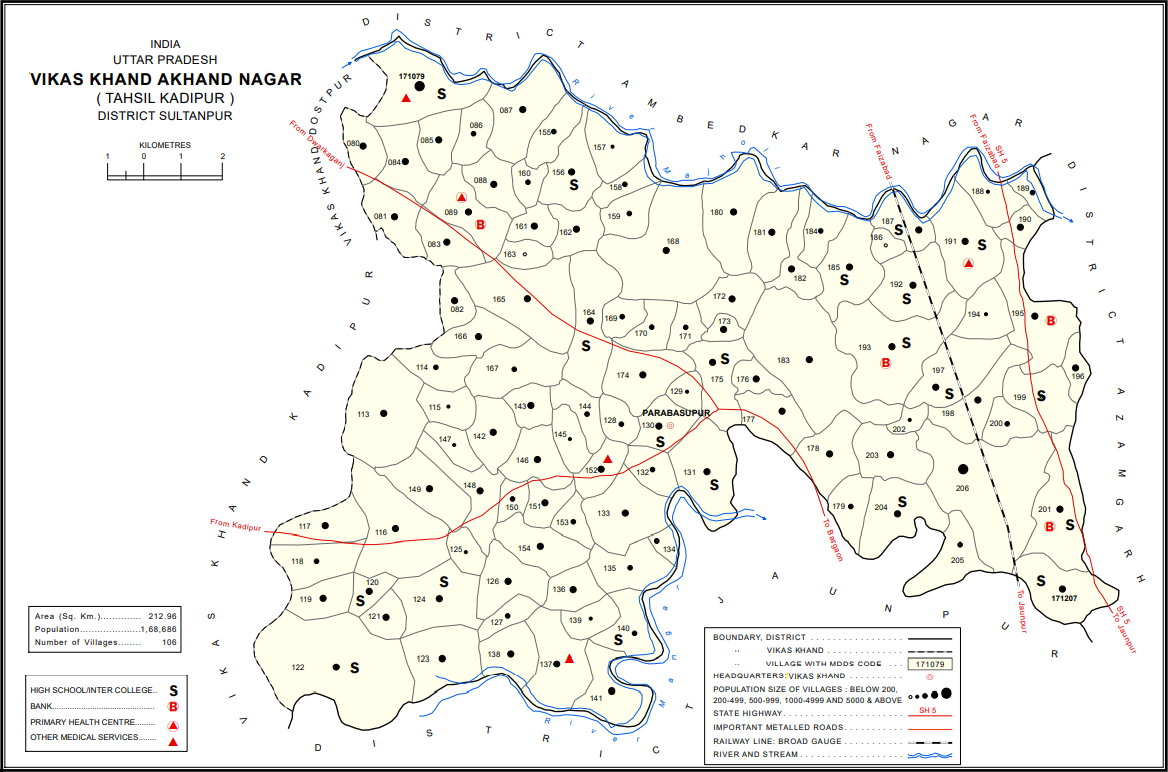
Map of Akhand Nagar CD block

Akhand Nagar is a community development block in Kadipur tehsil of Sultanpur district, Uttar Pradesh, India. It consists of 106 inhabited villages with a total population of 168,686 people in 25,112 households.

Akhand Nagar situated in 22 km east of Kadipur and is connected with Kadipur, Dostpur, Bilwai, Mohadi Sarai and Baramadpur. It has a police station on Kadipur Road and a petrol pump at Bilwai Road. The block office and electric power house are situated at Kadipur Road. There are two government banks – Bank of Baroda and State bank of India. One primary school for the primary education and a junior school up to 8th class.

== Demographics ==
As of 2011, Akhand Nagar CD block has a population of 168,686 people, in 25,112 households. This population includes 84,863 males and 83,823 females. The corresponding sex ratio of 988 females to every 1000 males is slightly higher than the district rural average of 987. Members of the 0-6 age group numbered 24,441 as of 2011, or about 14.5% of the total. The sex ratio of this group is 909, which is somewhat lower than the district rural average of 923. Members of Scheduled Castes numbered 47,572, or 28.20% of the total population (one of the highest proportions in the district); while members of Scheduled Tribes numbered 36, or 0.02% of the total. The literacy rate of Akhand Nagar block as of 2011 is 70.1% (counting only people age 7 and up); literacy is higher among men and boys (80.78%) than among women and girls (59.44%). The Scheduled Castes literacy rate as of the same year is 63.77% (74.96% among men and boys and 52.46% among women and girls).

In terms of employment, 20.30% of Akhand Nagar block residents were classified as main workers (i.e. people employed for at least 6 months per year) in 2011. Marginal workers (i.e. people employed for less than 6 months per year) made up 11.51%, and the remaining 68.19% were non-workers. Employment status varied significantly according to gender, with 44.57% of men being either main or marginal workers, compared to only 18.88% of women.

Agriculture is the predominant source of employment in Akhand Nagar block: 40.34% of the block's workers were cultivators who owned or leased their own land as of 2011, and a further 37.92% were agricultural labourers who worked someone else's land for wages. Another 3.01% were counted as household industry workers, and the remaining 18.73% were other workers. The block had the highest proportion of cultivators and lowest proportion of household industry workers in the district.

According to the 2001 census, the population of Akhand Nagar is 199,489 and the literacy rate is 55.64%.

== Villages ==
Akhand Nagar CD block has the following 106 villages:

| Village name | Total land area (hectares) | Population (in 2011) |
|---|---|---|
| Paharpur Bastipur | 404.3 | 5,703 |
| Sansarpur | 146.6 | 1,472 |
| Jaalalpur | 185.8 | 1,593 |
| Jaunara | 84.9 | 1,309 |
| Golhanpara | 154.5 | 1,008 |
| Sahigia | 189.4 | 1,348 |
| Pasiyapara | 153.5 | 1,793 |
| Bhagati | 125.5 | 637 |
| Naranpur Kalan | 341.1 | 1,727 |
| Masuran | 121.6 | 1,851 |
| Lokhathpur | 198 | 2,672 |
| Domapur | 500.2 | 2,218 |
| Kamiya Bahauddinpur | 120.9 | 757 |
| Rampur Jariya | 89.7 | 458 |
| Paudhanpur | 378.2 | 2,941 |
| Udari | 285.1 | 1,951 |
| Paharpur Sarpur | 38.3 | 506 |
| Hasanpur Taini | 173.8 | 1,665 |
| Baluaa | 84.3 | 1,162 |
| Misirpur Jamalpur | 137.9 | 1,789 |
| Hajipur Biri | 801.7 | 3,902 |
| Maruikishun Daspur | 323.8 | 2,208 |
| Umari | 260.9 | 2,189 |
| Dahula Khor | 58.9 | 232 |
| Ahirifiroj Pur | 254.7 | 1,809 |
| Ramnagar Sothiya | 75.1 | 528 |
| Bara Gaon | 156.7 | 591 |
| Jarauddinpur | 67.7 | 408 |
| Parabasoopur | 138.3 | 1,068 |
| Baraura Khwajapur | 353.8 | 2,398 |
| Pasna | 121.3 | 844 |
| Pajjoonpaharpur | 323.4 | 2,606 |
| Sekhauli | 82.2 | 553 |
| Jagudishpur | 194.6 | 948 |
| Brahimpur | 303.4 | 2,171 |
| Undorkha | 326.1 | 2,172 |
| Pattipipari | 167.8 | 1,516 |
| Khakhra | 27 | 276 |
| Jamalpur | 105.2 | 899 |
| Mahmoodpur | 244.9 | 1,755 |
| Misirpur Dhekaha | 165.7 | 1,278 |
| Saraiyamubarakpur | 125 | 1,188 |
| Alimuddinpur | 90.1 | 870 |
| Hajipur | 94.5 | 471 |
| Gidhauna | 177.4 | 1,401 |
| Losdha | 87.8 | 449 |
| Allipurkanpa | 229.5 | 2,145 |
| Aniudhapur | 206.5 | 1,112 |
| Bahauddipur | 61.9 | 888 |
| Tikari | 81.7 | 1,047 |
| Narwari | 139 | 1,812 |
| Bhairopur | 70 | 555 |
| Saranwa | 200.2 | 1,721 |
| Dadoopur | 120.9 | 652 |
| Kundabharopur | 194.9 | 2,289 |
| Chandipur | 179.4 | 481 |
| Baksara | 96.7 | 966 |
| Kalyanpur | 99.9 | 879 |
| Mahroopur | 80.4 | 770 |
| Salhoopara | 93.9 | 1,179 |
| Ratanpur | 145.3 | 1,029 |
| Saidpur | 55.7 | 28 |
| Barisahija | 210.2 | 1,493 |
| Tazddinpur | 478.3 | 3,841 |
| Harthuaa Babhanpur | 196.7 | 2,008 |
| Mauna | 213.4 | 604 |
| Faridpur | 559.4 | 3,857 |
| Jafarpur | 98.9 | 744 |
| Baharmapur | 119.2 | 765 |
| Gopalpur | 76.4 | 717 |
| Dasaoopur | 69.9 | 2,796 |
| Lorpur | 126.1 | 1,618 |
| Prannathpur Bachhariya | 313.1 | 2,941 |
| Bahrabhari | 297.9 | 2,845 |
| Jagdishpur | 129.9 | 1,193 |
| Alaauddinpur | 132.3 | 1,344 |
| Sahatpur | 223.4 | 1,051 |
| Khushamadpur | 108.1 | 861 |
| Nagari | 399.8 | 2,672 |
| Hakimpur | 166.4 | 1,214 |
| Kanakpur | 137 | 1,122 |
| Banganwadih | 552.1 | 4,167 |
| Ramnagar | 114.8 | 983 |
| Raypur | 270.2 | 1,738 |
| Ghurahoopur | 26.2 | 10 |
| Karai | 136.8 | 1,399 |
| Kotiya | 69 | 400 |
| Chamaroopur | 70.1 | 552 |
| Muradabad | 161.3 | 1,543 |
| Baramadpur | 350.6 | 3,251 |
| Sajampur | 275.8 | 1,749 |
| Banbahasirkhinpur | 526.9 | 3,157 |
| Kalwari Bagh | 183.3 | 336 |
| Bhelara | 385.8 | 3,656 |
| Bhiura | 122.2 | 1,045 |
| Harpur | 316.1 | 3,656 |
| Patarkhas | 235.8 | 2,321 |
| Khwajarawpur | 71.6 | 96 |
| Ghatampur | 115.5 | 956 |
| Belwaiamadhaupur | 191.4 | 1,896 |
| Khanpur Kalan | 64.3 | 413 |
| Rupaipur | 242.5 | 2,219 |
| Khanpur Pilai | 256.1 | 1,664 |
| Fajullapur | 98.5 | 752 |
| Mirpur | 1,025.2 | 7,077 |
| Kalan | 280.4 | 3,082 |
