= Daulatpur, Kadipur =

Daulatpur
- Village
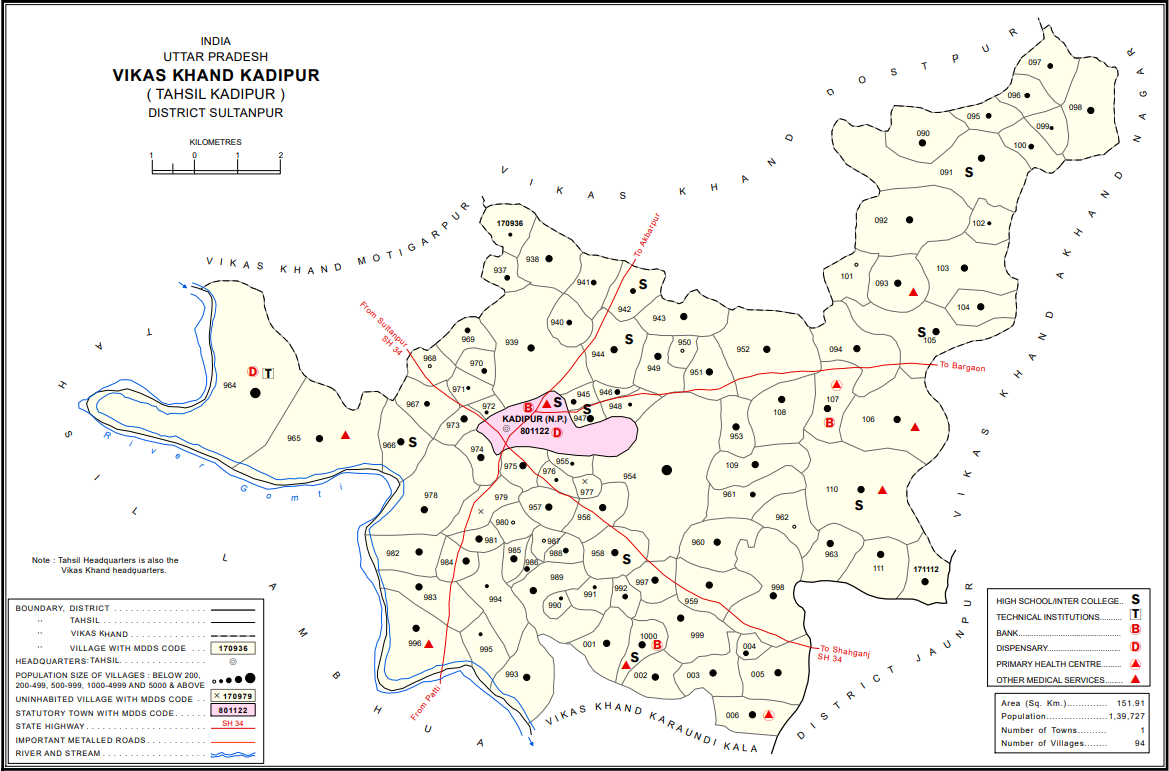
- Map showing Daulatpur (#957) in Kadipur CD block

- Location in Uttar Pradesh, India
- Coordinates: 26.153554°N 82.385622°E
- Country: India
- State: Uttar Pradesh
- Division: Faizabad division
- District: Sultanpur

Area
  - Total: 1.116 km^{2} (0.431 sq mi)

Population (2011)
  - Total: 1,261
  - Density: 1,130/km^{2} (2,927/sq mi)

Languages
  - Official: Hindi, Urdu
- Time zone: UTC+5:30 (IST)

Daulatpur is a village in Kadipur block of Kadipur tehsil in Sultanpur district, Uttar Pradesh, India. As of 2011, it has a population of 1,261 people, in 172 households. It has one primary school and no healthcare facilities and it does not host a regular market or a weekly haat. It belongs to the nyaya panchayat of Kalikapur Kalan.

Sharda Canal is the nearest canal and Gomti River is the closest river to the village. The distance of Daulatpur from state capital Lucknow is about 194 km and from the district headquarter Sultanpur is about 43 km in the east. This Place lies at the border of the Sultanpur District and Jaunpur District. There is no railway station in the range of 10 km and to reach by bus, the option can be via Sultanpur-Kadipur Road or by National Highway (NH330) and then to Sultanpur - Jaisinghpur Road.

== Demographics ==
As per 2011 India census, the total population of the Daulatpur village was 1,261 and the total number of the household was 172. Males constitute 49.7% (627) of the population and females 50.3% (634). The total literacy rate stood at 61.5% which was 70.3% for male and 52.7% for female. In Daulatpur, 14.35% of the population was under 6 years of age. Working population was 26% of the total population.

The 1951 census recorded Daulatpur as comprising 7 hamlets, with a total population of 330 people (172 male and 158 female), in 67 households and 55 physical houses. The area of the village was given as 268 acres. 17 residents were literate, all male. The village was listed as belonging to the pargana of Aldemau and the thana of Kadipur.

The 1961 census recorded Daulatpur as comprising 5 hamlets, with a total population of 421 people (206 male and 215 female), in 76 households and 76 physical houses. The area of the village was given as 268 acres.

The 1981 census recorded Daulatpur as having a population of 633 people, in 109 households, and having an area of 108.46 hectares. The main staple foods were listed as wheat and rice.

The 1991 census recorded Daulatpur as having a total population of 796 people (392 male and 404 female), in 133 households and 131 physical houses. The area of the village was listed as 171.56 hectares. Members of the 0-6 age group numbered 174, or 22% of the total; this group was 55% male (96) and 45% female (78). Members of scheduled castes numbered 221, or 28% of the village's total population, while no members of scheduled tribes were recorded. The literacy rate of the village was 34% (152 men and 62 women, counting only people age 7 and up). 195 people were classified as main workers (192 men and 3 women), while 0 people were classified as marginal workers; the remaining 601 residents were non-workers. The breakdown of main workers by employment category was as follows: 118 cultivators (i.e. people who owned or leased their own land); 29 agricultural labourers (i.e. people who worked someone else's land in return for payment); 0 workers in livestock, forestry, fishing, hunting, plantations, orchards, etc.; 0 in mining and quarrying; 0 household industry workers; 9 workers employed in other manufacturing, processing, service, and repair roles; 2 construction workers; 3 employed in trade and commerce; 10 employed in transport, storage, and communications; and 24 in other services.
