= National Highway 135A (India) =

National Highway in India

National Highway 135A

Route information
- Auxiliary route of NH 35
- Length: 256 km (159 mi)

Major junctions
- South end: Mirzapur
- North end: Ayodhya

Location
- Country: India
- States: Uttar Pradesh

Highway system
- Roads in India; Expressways; National; State; Asian
← NH 35	→ NH 27

National Highway 135A, commonly referred to as NH 135A is a national highway in India. It is a secondary route of National Highway 35. NH-135A runs in the state of Uttar Pradesh in India. बमयय

== Route ==
NH135A connects Mirzapur-Aura, Bhadohi- Jaunpur-Sindhora-Kerakat-Jaunpur-Shahganj-Akbarpur -Ayodhya in the state of Uttar Pradesh.

This is a section of Lumbini-Dudhi Road also known as Nawab Yusuf road.

NH 135A intersectsPurvanchal Expressway in Baramadpur village situated in border of Sultanpur and Azamgarh district.

== Junctions ==
NH 35 Terminal near Mirzapur.
NH 19 near Aurai
NH 731B near Bhadohi
NH 31 near Jaunpur
NH 128 near Akbarpur
NH 27 Terminal near Ayodhya.

== See also ==
- List of national highways in India
- List of national highways in India by state
