= Malipur =

Town in Uttar Pradesh, India

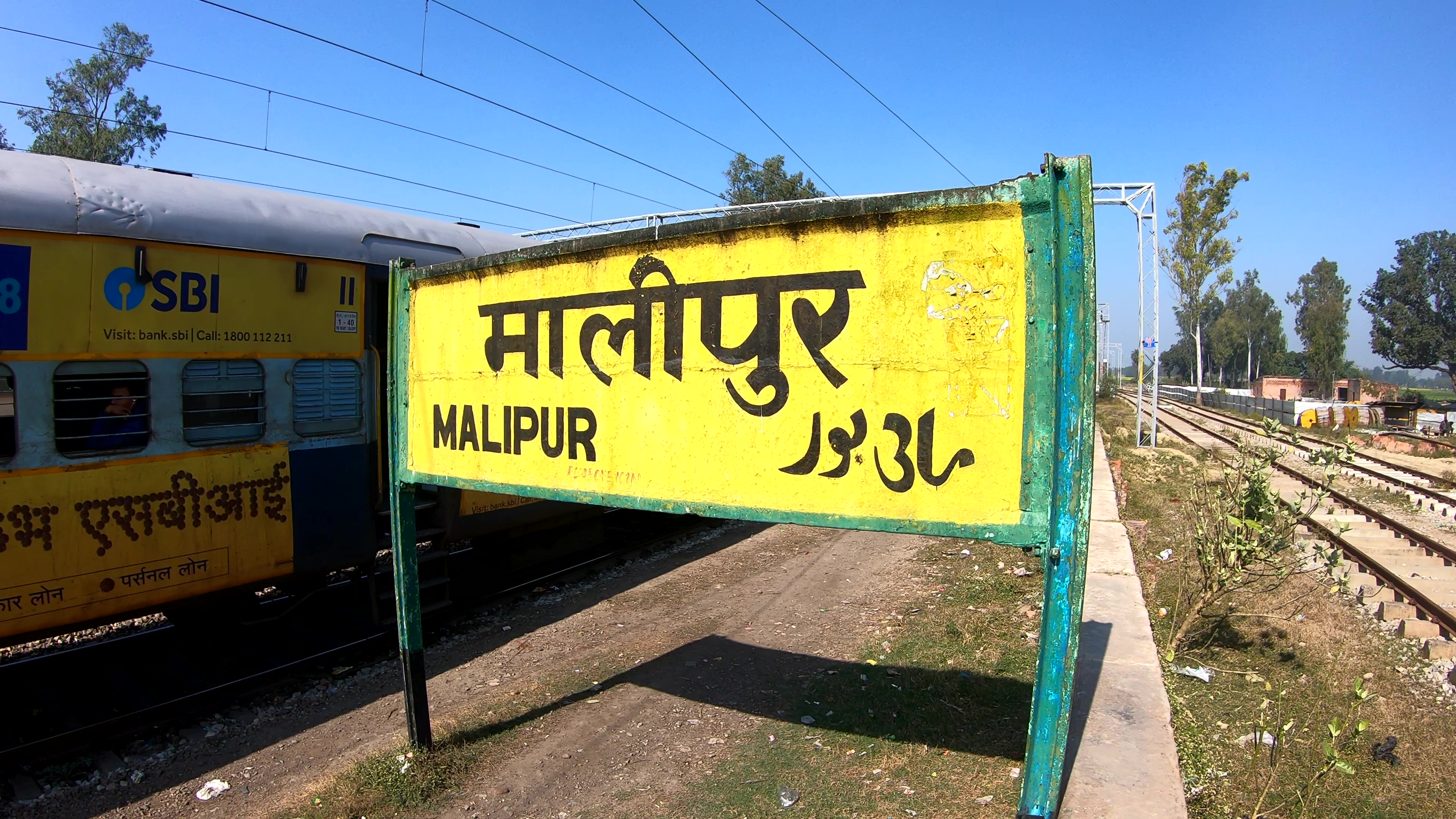
Malipur Railway Station

Malipur is a town in Ambedkar Nagar district. It is situated on National Highway 135A between Akbarpur (20 km) and Shahganj (27 km). Another Major District road : MDR82E passes through Malipur connecting Nempur to Ramgarh via Jalalpur. Malipur comes under Jalalpur tehsil and is connected to Jalalpur (12 km) by road. Malipur is also connected to all major cities of Uttar Pradesh via nearby passing Purvanchal Expressway, and the Gorakhpur Link Expressway. Malipur is best known for its namesake Railway station in Malipur which caters to local population . It is a NSG-5 category station which has halts of 8 daily trains. The Railway Station catered to around 160k travellers in 2024 . Major destinations include Delhi, Akbarpur, Shahganj, Ayodhya, Lucknow, & Varanasi.

Malipur comes under Jalalpur Assembly Constituency of Uttar Pradesh Vidhansabha, and Ambedkar Nagar Constituency of Loksabha.
