= Nawab Yusuf Road =

Road in Uttar Pradesh, India

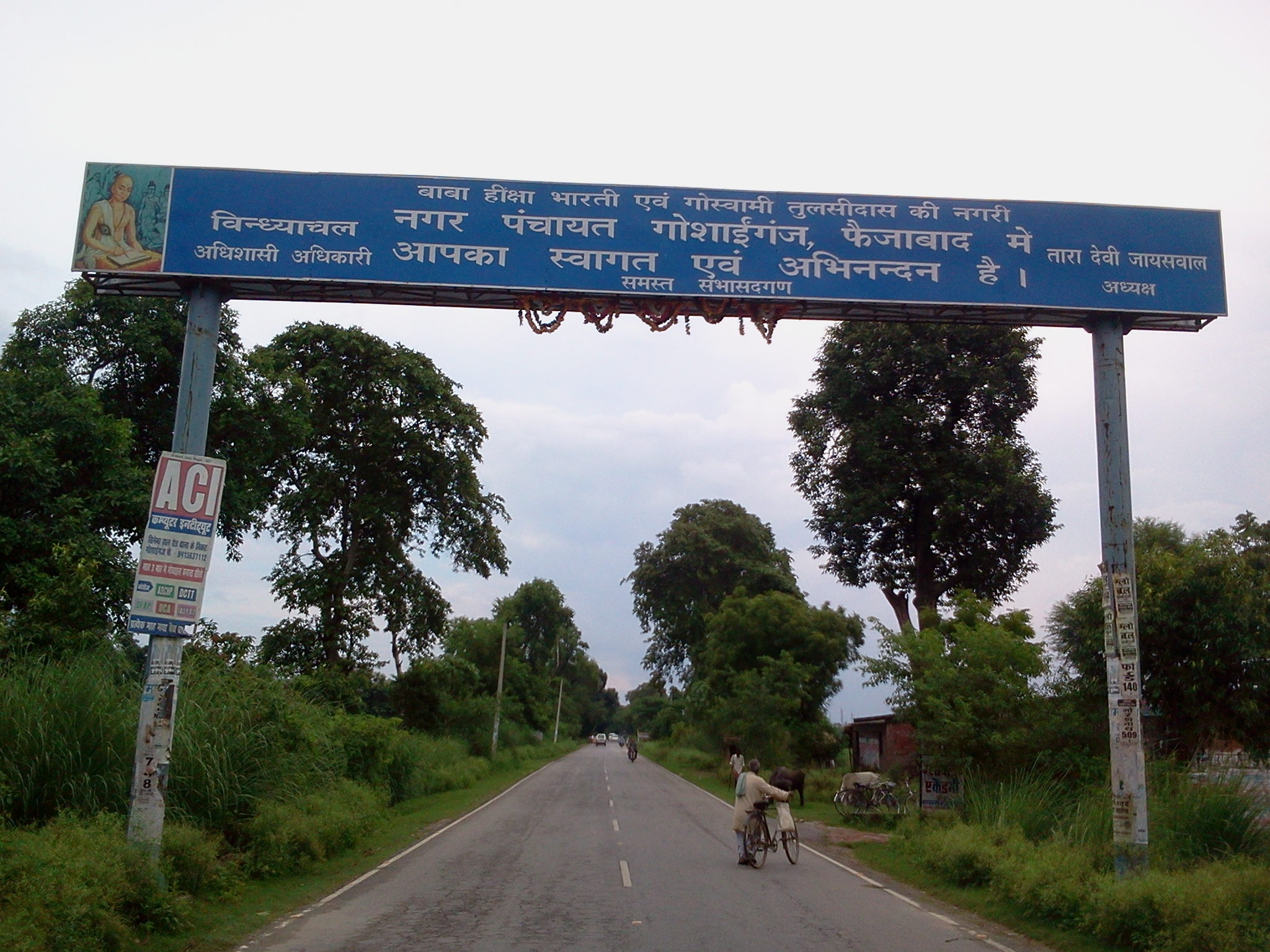
Nawab Yusuf Road

Route information
- Maintained by UPPWD
- Length: 135 km (84 mi)

Major junctions
- North end: Ayodhya
- Ayodhya, Akbarpur, Shahganj, Jaunpur
- South end: Jaunpur

Location
- Country: India
- State: Uttar Pradesh
- Primary destinations: Maya Bazar, Goshainganj, Akbarpur, Malipur, Shahganj, Jaunpur

Highway system
- Roads in India; Expressways; National; State; Asian; State Highways in Uttar Pradesh

Nawab Yusuf Road is situated in the Indian state of Uttar Pradesh, it connects Jaunpur to Ayodhya via Shahganj and Akbarpur.

Previously this road was known as Lumbini - Dudhi Marg.

A section of Nawab Yusuf Road (from Ayodhya to Mirzapur) is now declared National Highway. It's now National Highway 135A.

NH 135A will provide faster connectivity between two very important Holy cities - Ayodhya and Varanasi. NH 135A intersects Purvanchal Expressway in Bhelara village situated in border of Sultanpur and Azamgarh district. NH 135A will go through Ayodhya, Akbarpur - Ambedkar Nagar, Khajuri, Malipur, Shahganj, Jaunpur, Bhadohi, Aura - Mirzapur.

== Namesake ==
Barrister Nawab Sir Muhammad Yusuf, minister in the government of the United Provinces from 1926 to 1937. Nawab Sir Muhammad Yusuf was a descendant of the wazir of Shah Ibrahim, Sharqi sultan of Jaunpur in the 15th century.
