= Sajampur =

- Village
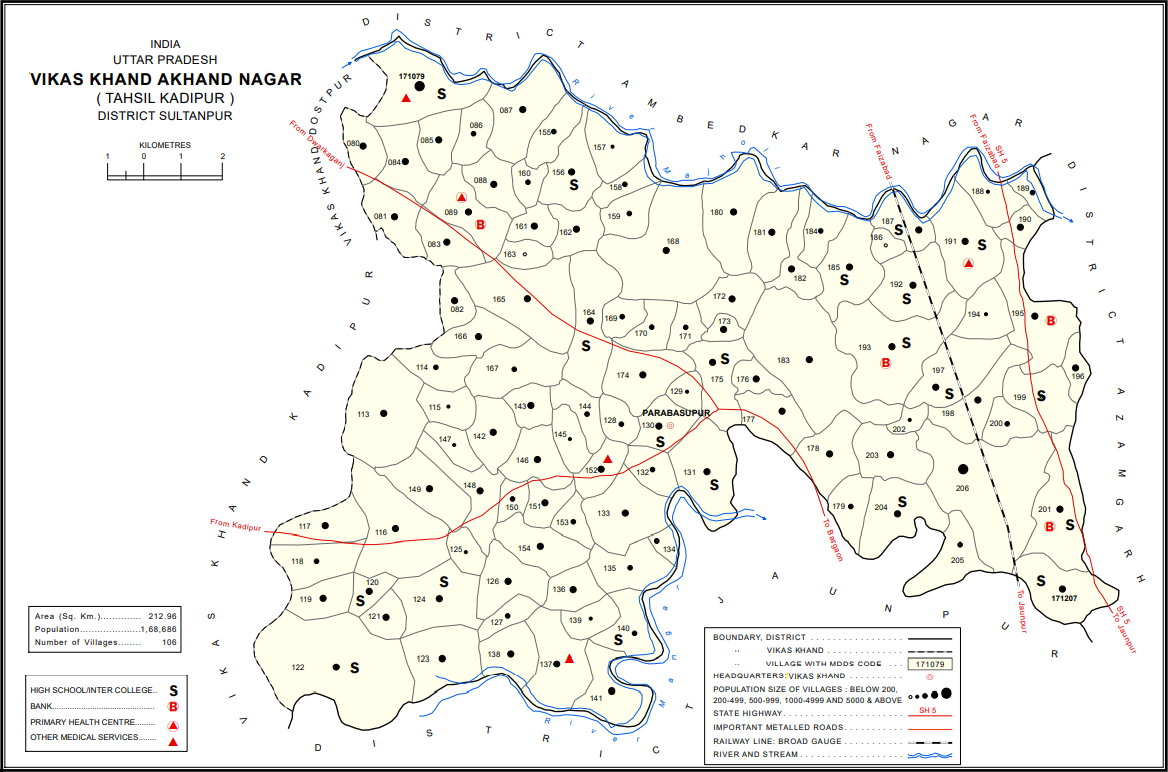
- Map showing Sajampur (#192) in Akhand Nagar CD block

- Location in Uttar Pradesh, India
- Coordinates: 26.229484°N 82.642347°E
- Country: India
- State: Uttar Pradesh
- Division: Faizabad division
- District: Sultanpur

Area
  - Total: 2.758 km^{2} (1.065 sq mi)

Population (2011)
  - Total: 1,749
  - Density: 634.2/km^{2} (1,642/sq mi)

Languages
  - Official: Hindi, Urdu
- Time zone: UTC+5:30 (IST)

Sajampur is a village in Akhand Nagar block of Kadipur tehsil in Sultanpur district of Uttar Pradesh, India. As of 2011, it has a population of 1,749 people, in 246 households. It has one primary school and no healthcare facilities and it does not host a regular market or a weekly haat. It serves as the seat of a nyaya panchayat which also includes 13 other villages.

The 1951 census recorded Sajampur as comprising 1 hamlet, with a total population of 582 people (289 male and 293 female), in 80 households and 72 physical houses. The area of the village was given as 734 acres. 25 residents were literate, all male. The village was listed as belonging to the pargana of Aldemau and the thana of Dostpur.

The 1961 census recorded Sajampur as comprising 1 hamlet, with a total population of 602 people (294 male and 308 female), in 101 households and 95 physical houses. The area of the village was given as 734 acres.

The 1981 census recorded Sajampur as having a population of 871 people, in 141 households, and having an area of 297.05 hectares. The main staple foods were listed as wheat and rice.

The 1991 census recorded Sajampur as having a total population of 1,192 people (611 male and 581 female), in 162 households and 135 physical houses. The area of the village was listed as 278.00 hectares. Members of the 0-6 age group numbered 316, or 26.5% of the total; this group was 59% male (188) and 41% female (128). No members of scheduled castes or scheduled tribes were recorded. The literacy rate of the village was 41% (280 men and 76 women, counting only people age 7 and up). 431 people were classified as main workers (283 men and 148 women), while 0 people were classified as marginal workers; the remaining 761 residents were non-workers. The breakdown of main workers by employment category was as follows: 201 cultivators (i.e. people who owned or leased their own land); 163 agricultural labourers (i.e. people who worked someone else's land in return for payment); 0 workers in livestock, forestry, fishing, hunting, plantations, orchards, etc.; 0 in mining and quarrying; 9 household industry workers; 4 workers employed in other manufacturing, processing, service, and repair roles; 2 construction workers; 21 employed in trade and commerce; 3 employed in transport, storage, and communications; and 28 in other services.
