= Kadipur =

Kadipur Kādīpur
- Town
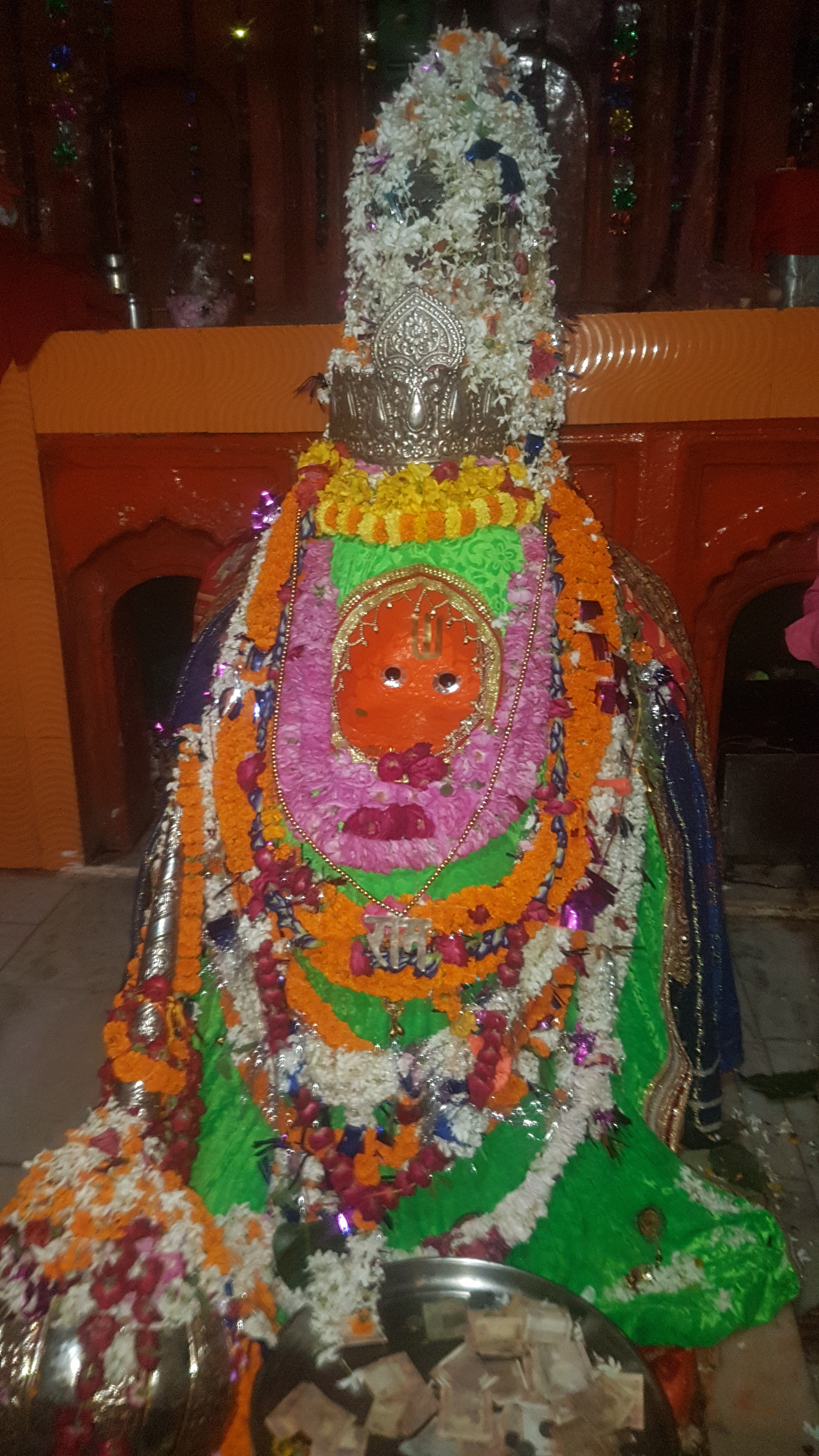
- Lord Hanumana rested at this place

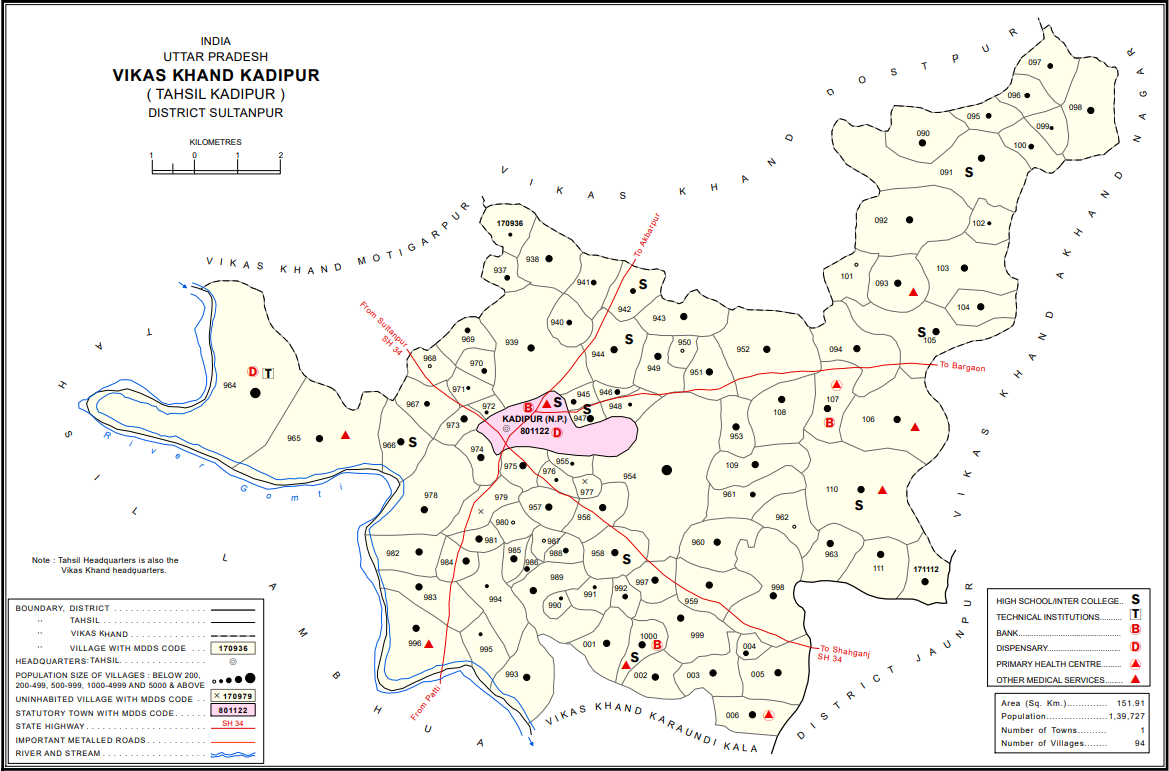
- Map showing Kadipur CD block

- Location in Uttar Pradesh, India Kadipur (India)
- Coordinates: 26.17°N 82.38°E
- Country: India
- State: Uttar Pradesh
- District: Sultanpur

Area
  - Total: 4 km^{2} (1.5 sq mi)
- Elevation: 90 m (300 ft)

Population (2011)
  - Total: 8,010
  - Density: 2,000/km^{2} (5,200/sq mi)

Language
  - Official: Hindi
  - Additional official: Urdu
  - Regional: Awadhi
- Time zone: UTC+5:30 (IST)
- PIN: 228145
- Vehicle registration: UP-44
- Blocks: Dostpur, Akhand Nagar, Kadipur, Karaundi Kala

Kadipur is a town, tehsil and a nagar panchayat in Sultanpur district in the Indian state of Uttar Pradesh. It is located a short distance from the bank of the Gomti River, at a crossroads between two roads heading from Sultanpur to Surapur and from Pratapgarh to Dostpur and then on to Akbarpur. On the north side of town is a stream with a steep ravine that drains the surrounding area. The road to Sultanpur crosses over this stream on a bridge. The lands surrounding Kadipur are average quality for agricultural purposes. As of 2011, Kadipur has a population of 8,010 people, in 1,216 households.

Kadipur tehsil has 4 blocks: Akhand Nagar, Dostpur, Kadipur and Karaundi Kala. The Chairman of Kadipur is Vijay Bhan Singh.

== Geography ==
Kadipur is located at 26.17°N 82.38°E. It has an average elevation of 90 metres (295 feet).

It is situated on the bank of Gomti River.

== History ==
Kadipur was historically a relatively minor village without any particular importance until it was made the headquarters of a tehsil. It was chosen mainly because it was centrally located within the tehsil. At the turn of the 20th century, Kadipur had the tehsil offices, a thana, a pound, and a thriving upper primary school. It also had a bazar, which was described as "a very small one for a tahsili town". A village bank had also been established. As of 1901, its population was 793, with the majority of the population being Brahmins. Kadipur was then held by some minor Rajkumar zamindars, with some of the Brahmins holding under-proprietary rights.

== Demographics ==
Historical population
Year	Pop.	±%
1991	5,235	—
2001	6,794	+29.8%
2011	8,010	+17.9%
Source: 2011 Census of India

As of 2011 Indian Census, Kadipur had a total population of 8,010, of which 4,114 were males and 3,896 were females. Population within the age group of 0 to 6 years was 1,083. The total number of literates in Kadipur was 5,571, which constituted 69.6% of the population with male literacy of 75.6% and female literacy of 63.1%. The effective literacy rate of 7+ population of Kadipur was 80.4%, of which male literacy rate was 87.2% and female literacy rate was 73.2%. The Scheduled Castes population was 1,304. Kadipur had 1216 households in 2011.

According to the 2001 census, Kadipur had a population of 6795. Males constitute 53% of the population and females 47%. Kadipur has an average literacy rate of 62%, higher than the national average of 59.5%: male literacy is 69%, and female literacy is 55%. In Kadipur, 16% of the population is under 6 years of age.

== Amenities ==
As of 2011, Kadipur has 2 hospitals with a total of 34 beds. It has 17 primary schools. There is no public library.A fire station is under construction on Chanda Road almost one kilometre from the Patel Chowk; . Wastewater and sewage are disposed of using an open drainage system. Water supply comes from both tube well and hand pump sources.

== Villages ==
Kadipur CD block has the following 94 villages:

Village name	Total land area (hectares)	Population (in 2011)
Taukalpur	94.3	417
Dhanepur	65	557
Banauta	115.1	1,027
Andaraypur	298	2,692
Kotiya	97.2	592
Salahpur	113.3	707
Budhana	96.2	823
Madanpur Kalan	230.6	1,084
Laxmanpur	161.2	2,332
Arjanipur	38.4	534
Higungapur	76.1	897
Malapur Jagdishpur	296.3	3,579
Chandnaia	65.8	457
Lauhara	88.3	1,020
Bhuwapur Sazaia	51.6	194
Kakana	144.7	2,026
Amrathuo Dadiya	483	3,079
Hamjapur Pathan	185.3	2,601
Bankegan	733.6	7,223
Chatur Khijrabad	62.3	473
Pandela	126.5	1,360
Daulatpur	111.6	1,261
Gaura Bibipur	193.9	1,759
Mangrawa	175	1,871
Kalikapur	174.4	1,255
Katghara Khurd	88.2	721
Kaymaspur	92.3	149
Kamrawan	163.5	1,526
Raibigo	909.6	5,933
Karsari	549.1	4,963
Baruaaripur	208	4,214
Katghar Mutarwahi	116.6	545
Ganapur	37.9	2
Saidpur Kalan	80.1	637
Bachhapara	59.4	634
Khijarabad	56.2	203
Bhimalpur	43.8	306
Narayanapara	59.4	1,008
Gopalpur Newajpur	246.2	2,293
Ranipur Kaysth	246.2	2,293
Bhaluaahi	31.2	473
Mustfabad	32.1	0
Aldamaoo Noorpur	165.1	1,293
Makhdoompur	38.6	0
Bhikhpur Aqbalpur	53.8	115
Khatiwpur	63.3	1,158
Saraykalyan	86.6	1,563
Jalalpur	209.6	2,474
Mohammdabad	66.8	1,469
Mithanepur	19.9	816
Bakshoopur	26.2	106
Nasirpur Saidan	64.1	638
Paharpur Shrirampur	182.1	2,308
Bhadaiya	30.3	396
Aasaipur	18.8	350
Prannathpur	67.7	503
Sarayani	305.2	2,890
Prannathpur Khurd	53.3	211
Sangapur	56.2	262
Kadipurkhurd	387.7	3,491
Saraya Kamaura	113.6	1,057
Taukalpur Nagara	87.6	3,461
Khandaura	147.5	1,474
Tailokpur Newada	410.8	1,426
Jafapur	107.9	1,394
Narottam	99.8	1,067
Pokhadaha	129.8	1,586
Laghaura	68.6	897
Bhawanipur	66.1	1,337
Bijethuaa Rajapur	285.6	3,307
Jalalpur Bakhra	148.1	1,743
Kumhi	525.6	4,367
Palidawapur	256.9	2,576
Hamidpur	127.2	1,422
Khalispur Mubarakpur	254.1	2,394
Katghara	70.4	939
Rohiyawa	82.2	761
Bahorapur	139.1	735
Biraiepur Bhatpura	294.5	2,821
Gangapur	52.5	359
Jalapur Rohiyawan	115.8	652
Sukhaoopur	103.1	3
Rampur Ukhtanda	75.2	205
Paharpur Basya	298.1	1,154
Sizilpur	192.9	1,505
Bari	244.8	1,638
Malipurnunra	434.4	3,658
Mudaladin	183.5	1,425
Rampur Khurd	151.1	1,349
Karopi	126.7	1,053
Majhgawan	474	3,257
Kumaihamjapur	139	1,218
Bhiti Paharpur	125	1,318
