= Dostpur =

Nagar panchayat in Uttar Pradesh, India

- Town
- Location in Uttar Pradesh, India
- Coordinates: 26.28°N 82.47°E
- Country: India
- State: Uttar Pradesh
- Division: Faizabad division
- District: Sultanpur
- Elevation: 81 m (266 ft)

Population (2011)
  - Total: 14,011

Language
  - Official: Hindi
  - Additional official: Urdu
- Time zone: UTC+5:30 (IST)
- Postal code: 228131

Dostpur is a town and a nagar panchayat in Sultanpur district in the state of Uttar Pradesh, India. The town borders Sultanpur and Ambedkarnagar. Purvanchal Expressway passes near the town.

== Geography ==
Dostpur is located at 26.28°N 82.47°E. It has an average elevation of 81 metres (265 feet).

== Demographics ==
As of 2011 Indian Census, Dostpur had a total population of 14,011, of which 7,217 were males and 6,794 were females. Population within the age group of 0 to 6 years was 2,232. The total number of literates in Bahraich was 9,155, which constituted 65.3% of the population with male literacy of 70.4% and female literacy of 60.0%. The effective literacy rate of 7+ population of Dostpur was 77.7%, of which male literacy rate was 84.1% and female literacy rate was 71.0%. The Scheduled Castes population was 3,149. Dostpur had 1984 households in 2011.

As of 2001 India census, Dostpur had a population of 11,877. Males constitute 53% of the population and females 47%. Dostpur has an average literacy rate of 57%, lower than the national average of 59.5%: male literacy is 63% and, female literacy is 51%. In Dostpur, 18% of the population in the age range of 0-6 years.

Dostpur is situated at the border of Sultanpur district. The river named "Majhui" separates Sultanpur district from Ambedkar Nagar.
