= Stutthof trials =

Series of war crime tribunals

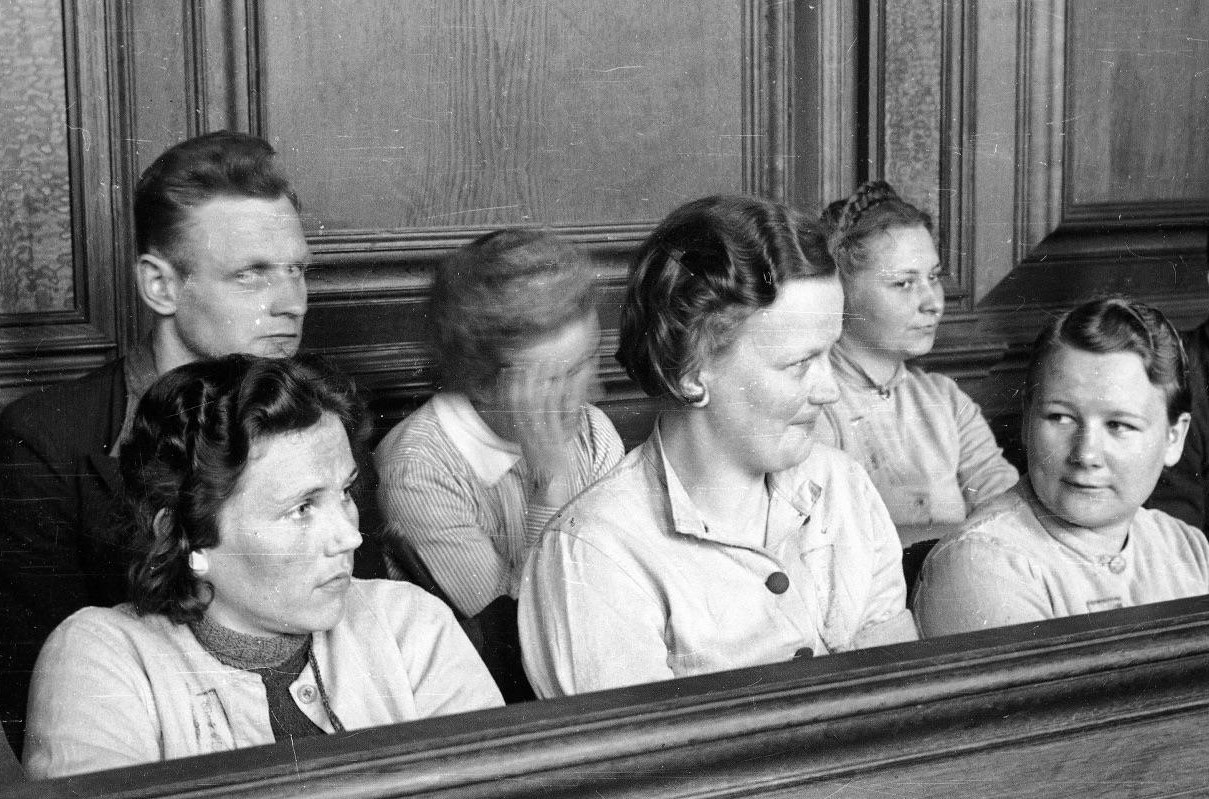
Female guards of the Stutthof concentration camp at a trial in Gdańsk between 25 April and 31 May 1946, along with their commandant. First row (from left): Elisabeth Becker, Gerda Steinhoff, Wanda Klaff. Second row: Johann Pauls, Erna Beilhardt, Jenny-Wanda Barkmann

The Stutthof trials were a series of war crime tribunals held in postwar Poland for the prosecution of Stutthof concentration camp staff and officials, responsible for the murder of up to 85,000 prisoners during the occupation of Poland by Nazi Germany in World War II. None of the Stutthof commandants were ever tried in Poland. SS-Sturmbannführer Max Pauly was put on trial by a British military court in Germany but not for the crimes committed at Stutthof; only as the commandant of the Neuengamme concentration camp in Hamburg. He was executed in 1946.

The first Polish war crimes tribunal was convened at Gdańsk, Poland, from 25 April to 31 May 1946. The next three trials took place at the same court in 8–31 October, 5–10 November, and 19–29 November 1947. The fifth trial was held before the court in Toruń in 1949. The sixth and the last Stutthof trial in Poland took place in 1953, also in Gdańsk. In total, of the approximately 2,000 SS men and women who ran the entire camp complex, 72 SS officers and six female overseers were punished.

== First Stutthof trial ==
During the first trial held at Gdańsk from 25 April to 31 May 1946, the joint Soviet/Polish Special Criminal Court tried and convicted of crimes against humanity a group of thirteen ex-officials and overseers of the Stutthof concentration camp in Sztutowo and its Bromberg-Ost subcamp for women located in the city of Bydgoszcz. The accused were arraigned before the court and all found guilty. Twelve were sentenced to death, including the commander of the guards Johann Pauls, while the remainder were sentenced to various terms of imprisonment. The death sentences were carried out on 4 July 1946 at the Biskupia Górka in Gdańsk by short-drop hanging, in the presence of a large crowd.

The commandant of the Stutthof and Neuengamme concentration camps SS-Sturmbannführer Max Pauly was sentenced to death in Germany at about the same time. Pauly was tried by the British for war crimes with thirteen others in the Curio Haus in Hamburg which was located in the British occupied sector of Germany. The trial lasted from 18 March to 13 May 1946. He was found guilty and sentenced to death with 11 other defendants. He was executed by long-drop hanging by Albert Pierrepoint in Hamelin Prison on 8 October 1946. The second commandant SS-Sturmbannführer Paul-Werner Hoppe (August 1942 – January 1945) was apprehended in 1953 in West Germany and later sentenced to nine years imprisonment.

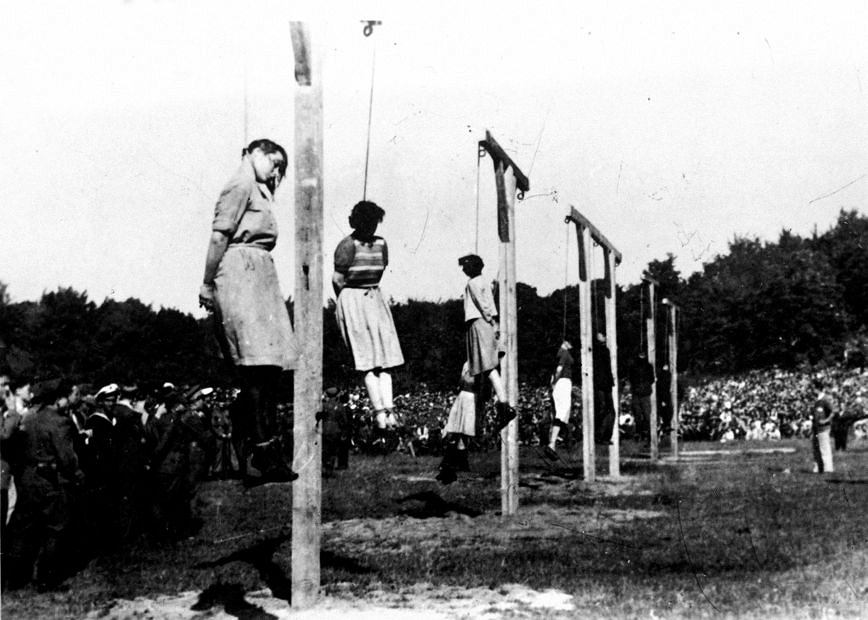
The execution of guards of the Stutthof concentration camp on Biskupia Górka Hill near Gdańsk on 4 July 1946. In the foreground were the female guards sentenced to hang: Barkmann, Paradies, Becker, Klaff, Steinhoff (left to right)

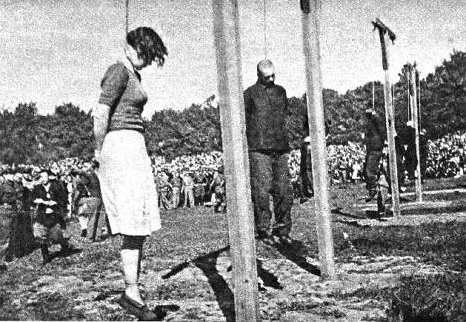
The execution of Steinhoff, Pauls and three kapos 4 July 1946

=== Verdicts in the first Stutthof trial ===
1. Johann Pauls, SS Oberscharführer: Death, executed 4 July 1946
2. Jenny-Wanda Barkmann, SS Aufseherin: Death, executed 4 July 1946
3. Elisabeth Becker, SS Aufseherin: Death, executed 4 July 1946
4. Wanda Klaff, SS Aufseherin: Death, executed 4 July 1946
5. Ewa Paradies, SS Aufseherin Death, executed 4 July 1946
6. Gerda Steinhoff, SS Blockleiterin: Death, executed 4 July 1946
7. Erna Beilhardt, SS Aufseherin: 5 years imprisonment
8. Tadeusz Kopczyński, (Kapo): Death, executed 4 July 1946
9. Wacław Kozłowski, Kapo: Death, executed 4 July 1946
10. Józef Reiter, Kapo: Death, executed 4 July 1946
11. Fanciszek Szopiński, Kapo: Death, executed 4 July 1946
12. Kazimierz Kowalski, Kapo: 3 years imprisonment
13. Jan Brajt, Kapo: Death, executed 4 July 1946
14. Aleksy Duzdal, Kapo: Not guilty
15. Jan Preiss, Kapo: Not guilty
16. Marian Zielkowski, Kapo: Died of a heart attack in prison 25 August 1945

== Second Stutthof trial ==
The second trial was held from 8 October to 31 October 1947, before a Polish Special Criminal Court. Arraigned 24 ex-officials and guards of the Stutthof concentration camp were judged and found guilty. Ten were sentenced to death.

=== Verdicts in the second trial ===
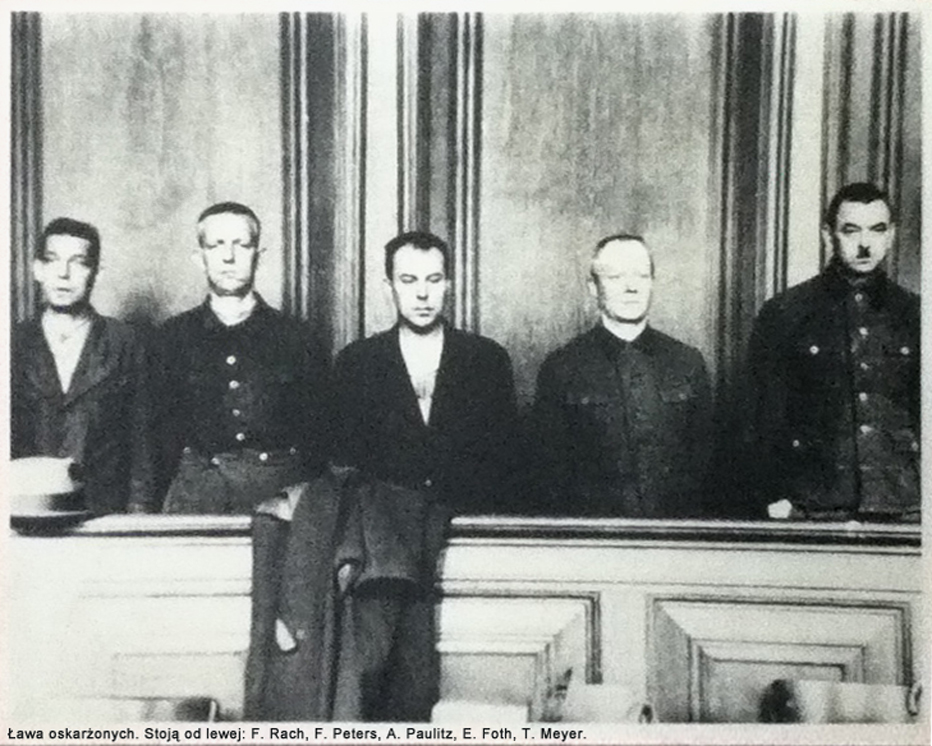
At trial, 1947, Gdańsk. Left to right: Hans Rach, Fritz Peters, Albert Paulitz, Ewald Foth, and Theodor Traugott Meyer

Nine SS men and the Kapo Nikolaysen were executed on 28 October 1948:

1. Kurt Dietrich, SS Unterscharführer: Death, executed 28 October 1948
2. Karl Eggert, SS Rottenführer: Death, executed 28 October 1948
3. Theodor Meyer, SS Hauptsturmführer: Death, executed 28 October 1948
4. Ewald Foth, SS Oberscharführer: Death, executed 28 October 1948
5. Albert Paulitz, SS Oberscharführer: Death, executed 28 October 1948
6. Fritz Peters, SS Unterscharführer: Death, executed 28 October 1948
7. Hans Rach, SS Oberscharführer: Death, executed 28 October 1948
8. Paul Wellnitz, SS Rottenführer: Death, executed 28 October 1948
9. Karl Zurell, SS Rottenführer: Death, executed 28 October 1948
10. Erich Thun, SS Unterscharführer: Life imprisonment
11. Wilhelm Vogler, SS Hauptsturmführer: 15 years imprisonment
12. Eduard Zerlin, SS Unterscharführer: 12 years imprisonment
13. Oskar Gottchau, SS Unterscharführer: 10 years imprisonment
14. Adolf Grams, SS Rottenführer: 10 years imprisonment
15. Emil Wenzel, SS Unterscharführer: 10 years imprisonment
16. Werner Wöllnitz, SS Rottenführer: 10 years imprisonment
17. Johannes Görtz, SS Unterscharführer: 8 years imprisonment
18. Karl Reger, SS Scharführer: 8 years imprisonment
19. Martin Stage, SS Scharführer: 8 years imprisonment
20. Adalbert Wolter, SS Unterscharführer: 8 years imprisonment
21. Josef Wennhardt, SS Scharführer: 8 years imprisonment
22. Hugo Ziehm, SS Scharführer: 3 years imprisonment
23. Walter Englert, SS Scharführer: 3 years imprisonment
24. Alfred Nikolaysen, Kapo: Death, executed 28 October 1948

== Third Stutthof trial ==
The third trial was held from 5 November to 10 November 1947 before a Polish Special Criminal Court. Arraigned 20 ex-officials and guards were judged; nineteen were found guilty, and one was acquitted.

=== Verdicts in the third trial ===
1. Karl Meinck, SS Obersturmführer: 12 years imprisonment
2. Gustav Eberle, SS Hauptscharführer: 10 years imprisonment
3. Erich Jassen, SS Hauptscharführer: 10 years imprisonment
4. Adolf Klaffke, SS Oberscharführer: 10 years imprisonment
5. Otto Schneider, SS Unterscharführer: 10 years imprisonment
6. Otto Welke, SS Sturmscharführer: 10 years imprisonment
7. Willy Witt, SS Unterscharführer: 10 years imprisonment
8. Alfred Tissler, SS Rottenführer: 5 years imprisonment
9. Johann Lichtner, SS Hauptscharführer: 5 years imprisonment
10. Ernst Thulke, SS Rottenführer: 5 years imprisonment
11. Heinz Löwen, SS Scharführer: 5 years imprisonment
12. Erich Stampniok, SS Unterscharführer: 5 years imprisonment
13. Hans Möhrke, SS Sturmscharführer: 4 years imprisonment
14. Harry Müller, SS Unterscharführer: 4 years imprisonment
15. Richard Timm, SS Hauptscharführer: 4 years imprisonment
16. Nikolaus Dirnberger, SS Scharführer: 4 years imprisonment
17. Friedrich Tessmer, SS Scharführer: 4 years imprisonment
18. Johann Sporer, SS Unterscharführer: 4 years imprisonment
19. Nikolai Klawan, SS Scharführer: 3 years imprisonment
20. Hans Tolksdorf, SS Oberscharführer: Not guilty

== Fourth Stutthof trial ==
The fourth trial was also held before a Polish Special Criminal Court, from 19 November to 29 November 1947. Arraigned 27 ex-officials and guards were judged; 26 were found guilty, and one was acquitted.

=== Verdicts in the fourth trial ===
1. Willi Buth, SS Hauptscharführer: Death, executed 10 January 1949
2. Albert Weckmüller, SS Hauptsturmführer: 15 years imprisonment
3. Rudolf Berg, SS Scharführer: 10 years imprisonment
4. Fritz Glawe, SS Unterscharführer: 10 years imprisonment
5. Horst Köpke, SS Unterscharführer: 10 years imprisonment
6. Emil Lascheit, SS Sturmscharführer: 10 years imprisonment
7. Kurt Reduhn, SS Unterscharführer: 10 years imprisonment
8. Josef Stahl, SS Unterscharführer: 10 years imprisonment
9. Waldemar Henke, SS Obersturmführer: 5 years imprisonment
10. Gustav Kautz, SS Unterscharführer: 5 years imprisonment
11. Hermann Link, SS Scharführer: 5 years imprisonment
12. Erich Mertens, SS Oberscharführer: 5 years imprisonment
13. Martin Pentz, SS Scharführer: 5 years imprisonment
14. Johann Pfister, SS Rottenführer: 5 years imprisonment
15. Johannes Wall, SS Sturmscharführer: 5 years imprisonment
16. Richard Akolt, SS Rottenführer: 3 years imprisonment
17. Anton Kniffke, SS Scharführer: 3 years imprisonment
18. Christof Schwarz, SS Hauptsturmführer: 3 years imprisonment
19. Gustav Brodowski, SS Rottenführer: 7 months' imprisonment
20. Walter Ringewald, SS Oberscharfuhrer: 7 months' imprisonment
21. Richard Wohlfeil, SS Hauptscharführer: 7 months' imprisonment
22. Johann Wrobel, SS Oberscharführer: 7 months' imprisonment
23. Ernst Knappert, SS Rottenführer: 7 months' imprisonment
24. Bernard Eckermann, SS Oberscharführer: 7 months' imprisonment
25. Leopold Baumgartner, SS Oberscharführer: 7 months' imprisonment
26. Emil Paul, SS Unterscharführer: 7 months' imprisonment
27. Franz Spillmann, Kapo: Not guilty

== Fifth and sixth trials ==
The last two trials in Poland concerning two Stutthof concentration camp officials took place four years apart. In 1949, SS-Hauptsturmführer Hans Jacobi, the commandant of Stutthof subcamps forming Baukommando Weichsel or OT Thorn (Organisation Todt Thorn) for women digging anti-tank ditches, was tried before the criminal court in Toruń and sentenced to three years in prison.

In 1953 the court in Gdańsk tried SS-man Bielawa (SS Rottenführer Paul Bielawa, a prisoner guard from the 3rd company in Stutthof between 1941–45) and sentenced him to twelve years. SS-Rottenführer Emil Strehlau was sentenced by the court in Toruń (Włocławek) on 23 April 1948 to death for war crimes. He was executed 8 November in Włocławek.

== Later trials ==
In the mid-1950s, a number of Nazi concentration camp commandants were sentenced to jail for supervising the murder of Jewish prisoners in gas chambers between 1942–1944, including Otto Knott, Otto Haupt and Bernard Lüdtke.

In 2017, the prosecution of two former Stutthof camp guards from Borken and Wuppertal commenced. The Wuppertal accused denied the allegations and declared that he was not present during the killings, and did not notice anything about it.

In November 2018, Johann Rehbogen from Borken was tried in court for serving at Stutthof camp from June 1942 to September 1944. In December 2018, the trial was suspended, since the convict had to be hospitalized for serious heart and kidney problems. On 25 February 2019, it was announced that the trial is unlikely to be restarted due to the poor health conditions of the defendant.

In October 2019, Bruno Dey from Hamburg was accused of contributing to the killings of 5,230 prisoners at Stutthof camp between 1944 and 1945. However, he was tried in a juvenile court due to being about 17 at that time. In July 2020, he was convicted of 5,232 counts of accessory to murder by the Hamburg state court, and was also convicted of one count of accessory to attempted murder.

In 2021, Irmgard Furchner, a German former concentration camp secretary and stenographer at Stutthof who worked for camp commandant Paul-Werner Hoppe, was charged with 11,412 counts of accessory to murder and 18 additional counts of accessory to attempted murder, On 20 December 2022, she was found guilty and sentenced to a suspended jail term of two years. On 20 August 2024, the German Federal Court of Justice would reject Furchner's appeal and uphold her conviction.

== See also ==
- Nuremberg trials of the 23 most important leaders of the Third Reich, 1945–1946
- Dachau trials held within the walls of the former Dachau concentration camp, 1945–1948
- Sobibór trial held in Hagen, Germany in 1965, concerning the Sobibór extermination camp
- Belzec trial before the 1st Munich District Court in the mid-1960s, eight SS-men of the Bełżec extermination camp
- Majdanek trials, the longest Nazi war crimes trial in history, spanning over 30 years
- Chełmno trials of the Chełmno extermination camp personnel, held in Poland and in Germany. The cases were decided almost twenty years apart
