= Ewa Paradies =

Nazi concentration camp official (1920–1946)

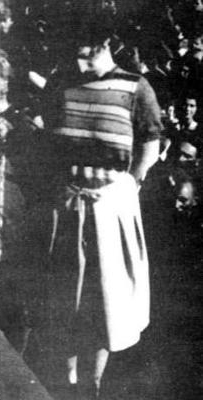
- Ewa Paradies after her execution
- Born: 17 December 1920; Lębork, Free City of Danzig
- Died: 4 July 1946 (aged 25); Biskupia Górka, Gdańsk, Republic of Poland
- Cause of death: Execution by hanging
- Occupation: Guards of the Stutthof concentration camp
- Political party: Nazi Party
- Motive: Nazism
- Conviction: Crimes against humanity
- Trial: Stutthof trials
- Penalty: Death

Ewa Paradies (17 December 1920 – 4 July 1946) was a Nazi concentration camp overseer.

In August 1944, Paradies arrived at the Stutthof SK-III camp for training as an Aufseherin, or overseer. She soon finished training and became a wardress. In October 1944, she was reassigned to Stutthof's Bromberg-Ost subcamp; and in January 1945, she was moved back to the main Stutthof camp. In April 1945, Paradies accompanied one of the last transports of women prisoners to the Lauenburg subcamp and fled. After she was captured, she was a defendant in the Stutthof trial. One witness testified: "She ordered a group of female prisoners to undress in the freezing cold of winter, and then doused them with ice cold water. When the women moved, Paradies beat them."

== Execution ==
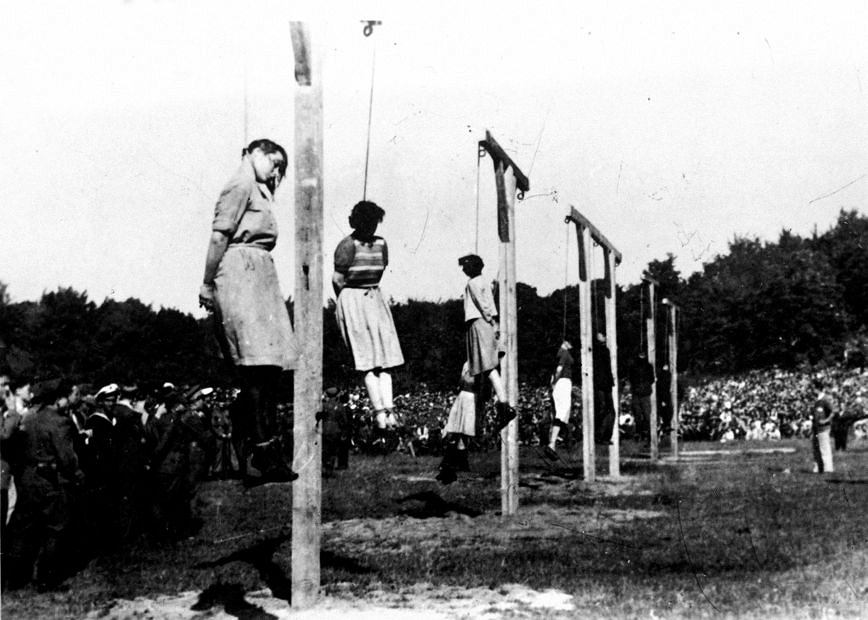
Public execution of Stutthof concentration camp personnel on 4 July 1946 by short-drop hanging. In the foreground, from left to right, are female camp overseers Jenny-Wanda Barkmann, Ewa Paradies, Elisabeth Becker, Wanda Klaff, and Gerda Steinhoff.

As punishment for her brutalities, including causing the deaths of some prisoners, Paradies was sentenced to death. She was publicly executed by short-drop hanging on Biskupia Górka Hill near Gdańsk on 4 July 1946 with ten other Stutthof guards and kapos (five women and six men in all); Paradies was the last woman to hang.

== See also ==
- Female guards in Nazi concentration camps

== Sources ==
- Daniel Patrick Brown. The Female Auxiliaries Who Assisted the SS in Running the Nazi Concentration Camp System. Atglen, Pennsylvania: Schiffer Publishing, Ltd., 2002. p. 288; ISBN 0-7643-1444-0
- Jack G. Morrison: Ravensbrück: Everyday Life in a Women's Concentration Camp 1939–45. Markus Wiener Publishers, 2000. p. 380; ISBN 1-55876-218-3
- Rochelle G. Saidel: The Jewish Women of Ravensbrück Concentration Camp. University of Wisconsin Press, 2004. p. 336; ISBN 0-299-19860-X
