= Johann Pauls =

Nazi concentration camp personnel (1908–1946)

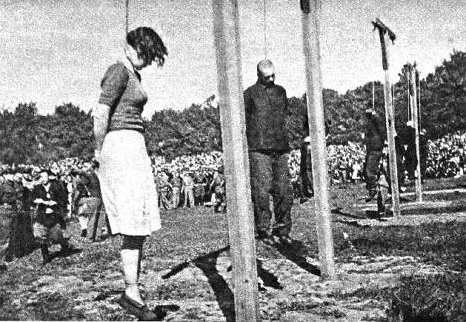
- Gerda Steinhoff (left) and Johann Pauls after their executions on 4 July 1946
- Born: 9 February 1908; Danzig, German Empire
- Died: 4 July 1946 (aged 38); Biskupia Górka, Gdańsk, Republic of Poland
- Cause of death: Execution by hanging
- Occupation: Oberscharführer in Stutthof concentration camp
- Political party: Nazi Party
- Conviction: Crime against humanity
- Trial: Stutthof trials
- Penalty: Death

Johann Pauls (9 February 1908 – 4 July 1946) was a German SS-Oberscharführer in Stutthof concentration camp. He was executed for war crimes.

== Career ==
Pauls was born in Danzig (Gdańsk), the third child of Johann August Pauls and Minna Steingräber. He joined the NSDAP, along with the SS, in the Free City of Danzig on 1 April 1931. From 21 July 1939 to 31 October 1941, he served in the reserve police force. From 1 November 1941 to 11 March 1943, he served in the Waffen-SS infantry and SS-Schütze reserve.

Pauls was transferred to SS-Totenkopfsturmbann of Sachsenhausen concentration camp in April 1943. Thereafter, as an SS-Oberscharführer, he was commandant of the guards in Stutthof concentration camp until the end of the war in 1945.

== After the war ==
=== Trial ===
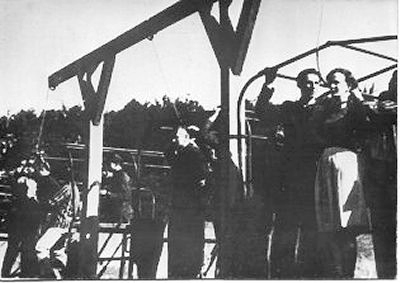
Execution of Pauls and others

He was tried in the first Stutthof trial by the Soviet/Polish Special Criminal Court, which was held in Gdańsk (Danzig) from 25 April 1946 to 31 May 1946. In the company of 12 other guards and kapos, he was convicted of war crimes, along with 10 other accused, and sentenced to death.

=== Execution ===
After he was sentenced to death, Pauls tried to commit suicide in the prison, but he was saved. Pauls was executed by short-drop hanging on 4 July 1946 at Polish: Wysoka Górka (German: Stolzenberg). He was brought to the place of execution along with 10 other prisoners, five men and five women. The convicts were on the backs of 11 trucks, bound hand and foot. Pauls was collared with a noose at the centre of the gallows and pushed out of the truck. On one side of him was Gerda Steinhoff; on his other side, an unknown kapo.
