= Jenny-Wanda Barkmann =

Nazi concentration camp guard (1922–1946)

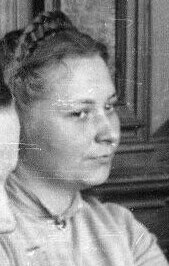
- Barkmann at the Stutthof trials in 1946
- Born: 30 May 1922; Hamburg, Weimar Republic
- Died: 4 July 1946 (aged 24); Biskupia Górka, Gdańsk, Republic of Poland
- Cause of death: Execution by hanging
- Other name: "Beautiful Spectre"
- Occupation: Guard of the Stutthof concentration camp
- Political party: Nazi Party
- Conviction: Crime against humanity
- Trial: Stutthof trials
- Penalty: Death

Jenny-Wanda Barkmann (30 May 1922 – 4 July 1946) was a war criminal and German overseer in Nazi concentration camps during World War II. After the war, she was tried and executed for crimes against humanity.

== Biography ==
Barkmann was born in 1922 and is believed to have spent her childhood in Hamburg.

In 1944, Barkmann volunteered with the Schutzstaffel as an Aufseherin, a concentration camp overseer, in the Stutthof SK-III women's subcamp in Poland, where she brutalized prisoners, sometimes to death. She also selected women and children for the gas chambers. Women prisoners nicknamed her the Beautiful Spectre.

Barkmann fled Stutthof and hid in Gdańsk, where she was arrested at a train station in May 1945 for her criminal wartime acts. In 1946, she became a defendant in the first Stutthof trial, where she and other defendants were convicted for their crimes at the camp. After she was found guilty she declared, "Life is indeed a pleasure, and pleasures are usually short."

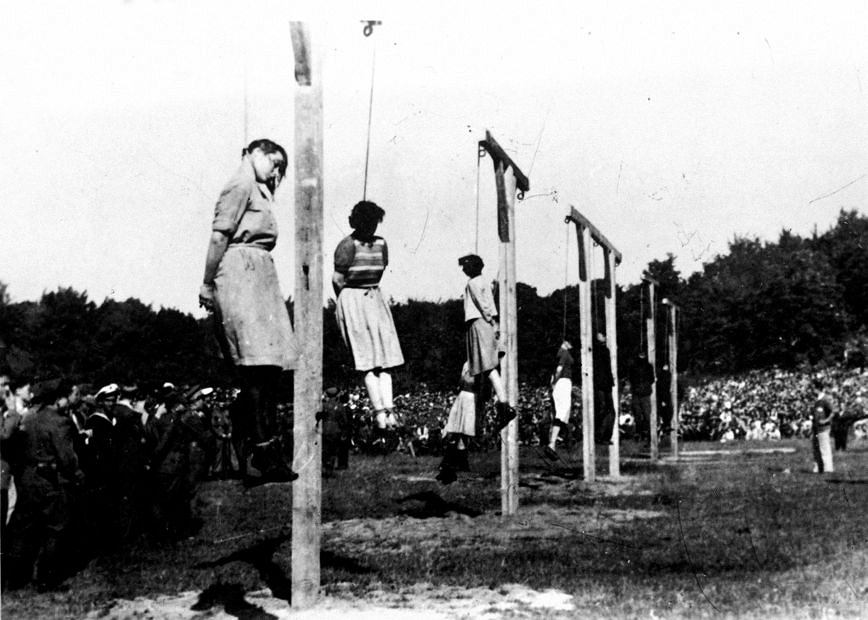
Public execution of Stutthof concentration camp personnel on 4 July 1946 by short-drop hanging. In the foreground, from left to right, are female camp overseers Barkmann, Ewa Paradies, Elisabeth Becker, Wanda Klaff, and Gerda Steinhoff.

Barkmann was publicly executed by short-drop hanging along with ten other defendants from the trial on Biskupia Górka Hill near Gdańsk on 4 July 1946. Former Stutthof prisoners volunteered to conduct the executions. She was 24 years old at the time of her death.

== See also ==
- Female guards in Nazi concentration camps
