= Wanda Klaff =

Nazi concentration camp guard (1922–1946)

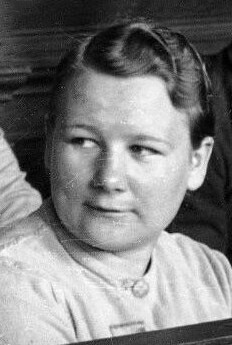
- Klaff at the Stutthof trial in 1946
- Born: Wanda Kalacinski; 6 March 1922; Danzig, Free City of Danzig
- Died: 4 July 1946 (aged 24); Biskupia Górka, Gdańsk, Republic of Poland
- Cause of death: Execution by hanging
- Occupation: Guard of the Stutthof concentration camp
- Conviction: Crimes against humanity
- Trial: Stutthof trials
- Penalty: Death

Wanda Klaff (6 March 1922 – 4 July 1946) was a Nazi concentration camp overseer. Klaff was born in Danzig to German parents as Wanda Kalacinski. After the war, she was executed for crimes against humanity.

== Early life ==
Wanda Kalacinski was the daughter of railway worker Ludwig Kalacinski. The family name was changed to Kalden in 1941. She finished school in 1938 and worked in a jam factory until 1942. That year, she married Willy Klaff, then a streetcar operator, and became a housewife.

== SS career, arrest, trial and execution ==
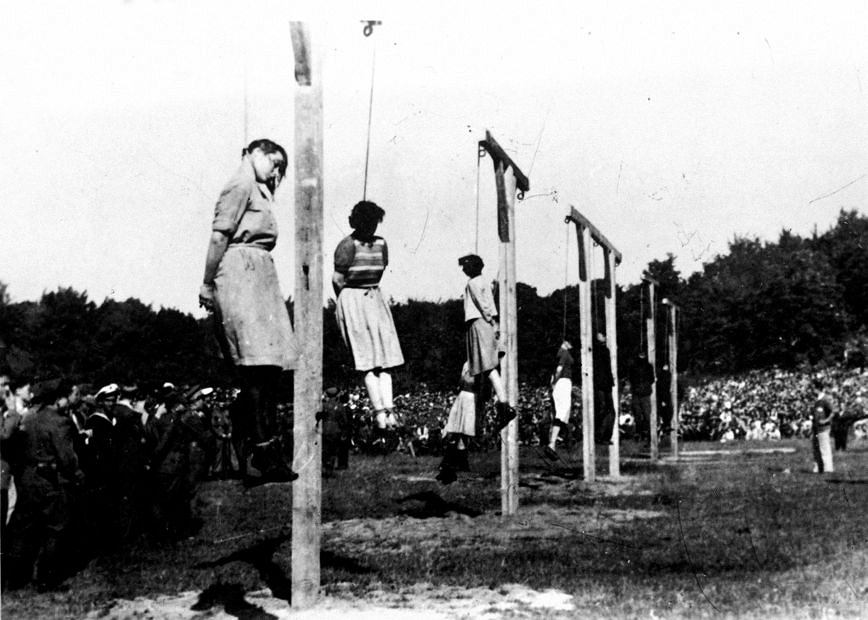
Public execution of Stutthof concentration camp personnel on 4 July 1946 by short-drop hanging. In the foreground, from left to right, are female camp overseers Jenny-Wanda Barkmann, Ewa Paradies, Elisabeth Becker, Wanda Klaff, and Gerda Steinhoff.

In 1944, Klaff joined the Stutthof concentration camp staff at Stutthof's Praust subcamp in present-day Pruszcz, where she abused many of the prisoners. On 5 October 1944, she arrived at Stutthof's Russoschin subcamp, in present-day northern Poland.

Klaff fled the camp in early 1945 but on 11 June 1945 was arrested by Polish officials; soon after, she fell ill from typhoid fever in prison. She stood trial at the first Stutthof trial with other former female supervisors and male personnel. She stated at the trial, "I am very intelligent and very devoted to my work in the camps. I struck at least two prisoners every day."

Klaff was convicted and received the death sentence. She was publicly hanged by short-drop method on 4 July 1946 on Biskupia Górka Hill near Gdańsk, aged 24.

== Sources ==
- Benjamin B. Ferencz, Less Than Slaves: Jewish Forced Labor and the Quest for Compensation, books.google.com; accessed 13 November 2014.
