= Klaff =

Klaff is a surname. Notable people with the surname include:

- Jack Klaff (born 1951), South African actor, writer, and academic
- Wanda Klaff (1922–1946), Nazi concentration camp overseer executed for war crimes
