= Bromberg-Ost =

Nazi concentration camp in modern Bydgoszcz, Poland

Coordinates: 53°7′N 18°00′E

Bromberg-Ost concentration camp
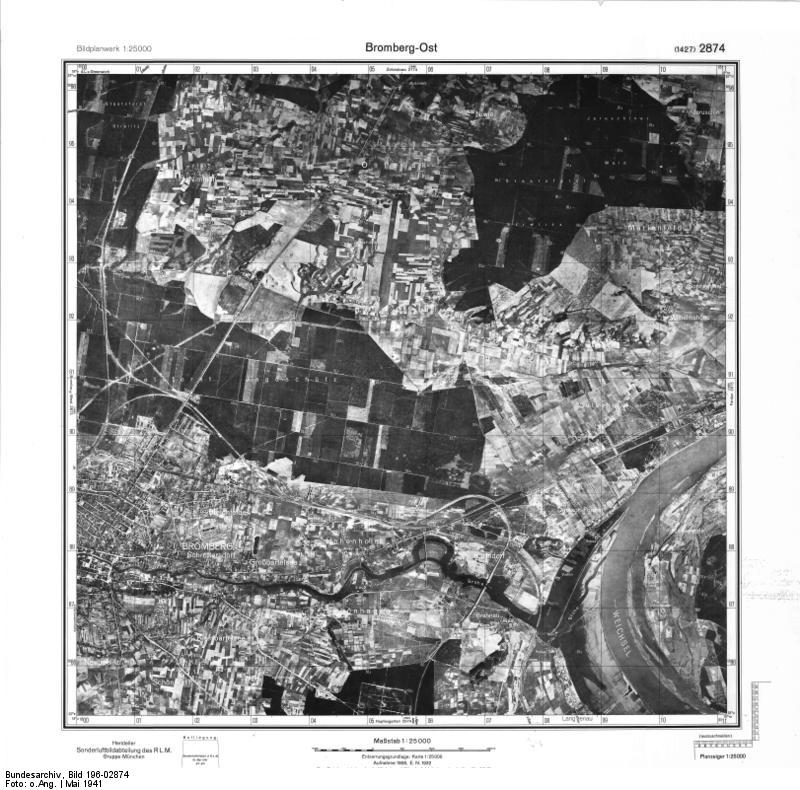
1	German aerial photograph of Bromberg-Ost with concentration camp location marked in red

Operation
- Period: 12 September 1944 – 20 January 1945
- Prisoners: Averaging 300 female prisoners

Bromberg-Ost (German: Konzentrationslager Bromberg-Ost) was the female subcamp of the German Nazi concentration camp KL Stutthof between 1944 and 1945, set up in the city of Bydgoszcz during the later stages of World War II. The mostly Jewish women prisoners dispatched from the main camp in Sztutowo worked as slave-labourers for the German railways – loading cargo, clearing and repairing tracks, and digging ditches. The commandant of the camp was SS-Scharführer Anton Kniffke.

== History ==
The direct order to set up the Bromberg-Ost subcamp was issued on 12 September 1944, by the superintendent of Stutthof concentration camp, Paul Werner Hoppe. The camp was situated between Kamienna and Fabryczna Streets. The following day the first 300 women prisoners were sent there under the control of seven female overseers belonging to Schutzstaffel (SS). No warm clothing was provided before mid-December. Women who managed to survive were taken on a death march to Sachsenhausen-Oranienburg. From June 1944 until March 1945 the position of Oberaufseherin in Bromberg-Ost was held by Johanna Wisotzki, while among guards reassigned to Bromberg-Ost from Stutthof were the notoriously cruel Aufseherinnen (female overseers) Herta Bothe (died March 2000), Ewa Paradies (hanged 1946) and Gerda Steinhoff (hanged 1946), who took part in selections of prisoners to be sent to the gas chambers. A group of thirteen ex-officials and overseers of the Bromberg-Ost and Stutthof concentration camps were tried and convicted of crimes against humanity at the Stutthof trials, the war crime tribunals held at Gdańsk, Poland, from April 25, 1946, to May 31, 1946. Eleven convicts were sentenced to death, while the remainder were sentenced to various terms of imprisonment.
