= Henryk Moruś =

Polish serial killer

- Born: 25 March 1943; Sulejów, Poland
- Died: 18 August 2013 (aged 70); Czarne, Poland
- Conviction: Murder (7 counts)
- Penalty: Death; commuted to life imprisonment

Details
- Victims: 7
- Span of crimes: 1986–1992
- Country: Poland
- State: Piotrków Voivodeship

Henryk Moruś (25 March 1943 – 18 August 2013) was a Polish serial killer who was convicted in 1993 for committing seven murders in the territory of Piotrków Voivodeship. He was the last prisoner to be sentenced to death in Poland in accordance with the European Convention of Human Rights.

== Investigation ==
Henryk Moruś was arrested in 1992. Initially, he confessed to all seven murders that were attributed to him, citing that material problems with his family were his motive. However, he declared he was innocent at the pre-trial investigation.

The prosecution accused him of shooting seven people in a robbery with his carbine. The first murder was carried out in 1986, and the rest in the first half of 1992.

During the long-lasting court proceedings, the accused did not speak, did not show remorse, and made offensive gestures, which suggested a lack of senses. Expert psychiatrists recognized him as sane and completely accountable for his actions — they did not see him as having the capacity for higher feelings though. According to his family, he was a good husband and a caring father of three children. In 1993, the Provincial Court of Piotrków Trybunalski sentenced Moruś for four murders to the death penalty with indefinite deprivation of public rights, and for three other murders and three offences (theft, illegal alcohol and illegal possession of a firearm without a permit) to 25 years imprisonment.

== Victims ==
No.	Victim	Age	Date of murder	Place of murder
1.	Teresa Grabowska	60	22 March 1986	Włodzimierzów
2.	Danuta Krawczyk	60	14 January 1992	Piotrków Trybunalski
3.	Andrzej Kłosiński	60	16 January 1992	Koluszki
4.	Mieczysław Beśko	35	11 June 1992	Sulejów
5.	Zdzisława Beśko	29	11 June 1992	Sulejów
6.	Józef Jęcek	60	23 June 1992	Ciechomin
7.	Jarosław Kszczot	20	26 June 1992	Adamów

== Appeals ==
On 3 December 1993, in the proceedings before the second instance at the Łódź Court of Appeal, the sentence was lifted, returning the case for re-examination, stating that the ruling of the Piotrków court was affected by significant deficiencies. The court came to the decision that only Andrzej Kłosiński's murder could be proven at first, which was helped by the admission of Moruś, who initially denied any involvement before the court. It had also not been determined whether one or more people participated in the murder, as three witnesses gave different stories. The court re-imposed the same penalty in 1995.

Two separate appeals lodged by the Moruś' defenders accused the court of many contradictions contained in the court's assessment and questioned the death penalty in the current moratorium on executions. The court of appeal, which considered defence applications, supplemented (as a rarity) evidence of new expert opinions. Ultimately, however, the lower sentence was upheld. The accused's last words were that he had not killed anyone and that the sentence was given coldly.

In the justification, the court stressed the causal relationship between the evidence and the assessment of the first sentence. The court also issued a verdict that the death penalty does not contradict Art. 2 of the European Convention on Human Rights, because (according to the law), it allows for it under Polish law, and the moratorium only concerns the periodic execution of the death penalty. Defending attorney Wiktor Celler announced that he would appeal for cassation. Finally, after the abolition of the death penalty in Poland with the enforcement of the Penal Code in 1998, it was turned into a life sentence for Moruś.

== Punishment and application for pardon ==
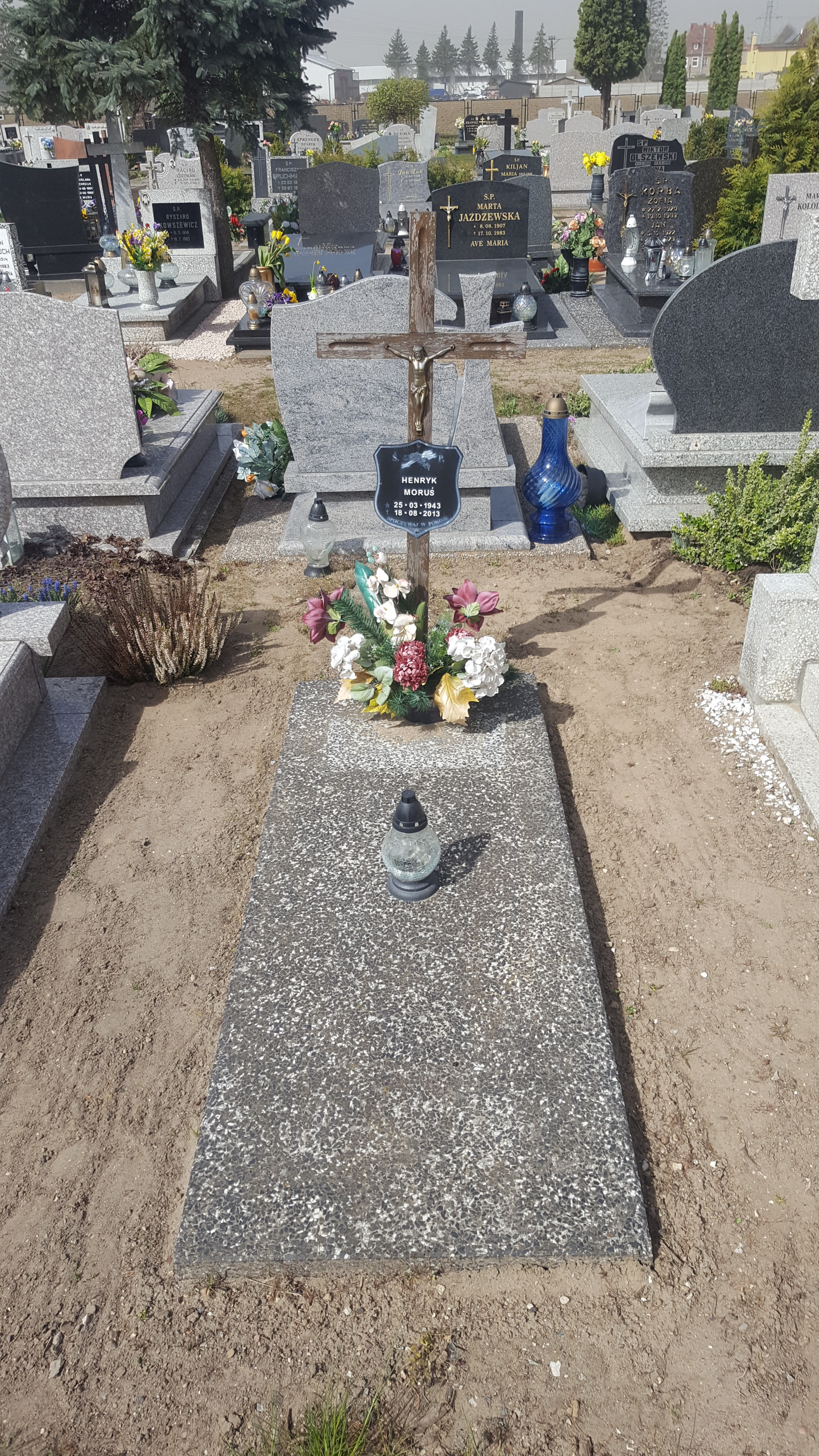
Moruś's grave

Moruś was detained in a prison for recidivists in a seven-person cell in the Wołów Prison. His behaviour in penitentiary services was so good that he used the right to work, sewing leather balls in the sewing room. In 2008, he applied for a pardon to president Lech Kaczyński. He emphasized that the punishment changed his life a lot, he regrets what he did, he became a Jehovah's witness in prison and would like to spend the rest of his life there. The Łódź Court of Appeal issued a negative opinion on the pardon application, just like the District Court in Piotrków - it was decided to leave the request without further progress. In November 2009, Moruś was moved due to health complications from Wołów to Wrocław.

== Death ==
Henryk Moruś died on 18 August 2013, in the prison hospital of Czarne. He was 70 years old. The most probable cause of death was atherosclerosis, ischemic cardiomyopathy or heart failure. The family did not pick up his corpse, so his burial was organised by the prison. Moruś was buried in the municipal cemetery at Sienkiewicz Street in Człuchów.

== See also ==
- List of serial killers by country
- Capital punishment in Poland
