= Elisabeth Becker =

German concentration camp guard (1923–1946)

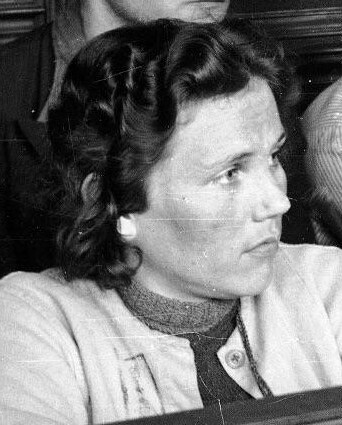
- Becker at the Stutthof trials in 1946
- Born: 20 July 1923; Neuteich, Free City of Danzig
- Died: 4 July 1946 (aged 22); Biskupia Górka, Gdańsk, Republic of Poland
- Cause of death: Execution by hanging
- Occupation: Guard of the Stutthof concentration camp
- Organization: SS-Gefolge (Women's SS Division)
- Political party: Nazi Party
- Motive: Nazism
- Conviction: Crimes against humanity
- Trial: Stutthof trials
- Penalty: Death

Details
- Victims: 30+
- Span of crimes: 5 September 1944 – 15 January 1945
- Country: Poland
- Location: Stutthof concentration camp

Elisabeth Becker (20 July 1923 – 4 July 1946) was a Nazi concentration camp overseer in World War II. She was convicted at the Stutthof trials of crimes against humanity and executed.

== Life ==
Becker was born in Neuteich, Danzig (today Nowy Staw, Poland), to a German family. In 1936, aged 13, she joined the League of German Girls. In 1938, she became a tramway conductor in Danzig. In 1940, she began working for the Dokendorf firm in Neuteich, where she was employed until 1941, when she became an agriculture assistant in Danzig.

== Camps ==
In 1944, the SS needed more guards at the nearby Stutthof concentration camp, and Becker was called up for service. She arrived at Stutthof on 5 September 1944 to begin training as an SS-Aufseherin, or overseer. She later worked in the Stutthof SK-III women's camp.

== Post-war ==
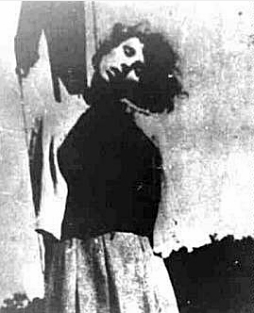
Elisabeth Becker was publicly executed 4 July 1946 at Biskupia Gorka.

After working in the camp for four months, Becker fled on 15 January 1945 and returned home to Neuteich. Three months later, on 13 April, Polish police arrested her and placed her in prison to await trial.

The first Stutthof trial began in Danzig on 31 May 1946, with five former SS women and several kapos as defendants. Becker, along with ten other defendants, was found guilty and sentenced to death. She had confessed to selecting at least 30 female prisoners to be gassed, but later retracted her confession, claiming she had not selected women to be gassed and instead only that they were not fit to work.

Becker sent several letters to Polish president Bolesław Bierut requesting that her sentence be commuted. The court had recommended that Becker's sentence be commuted to 15 years on the grounds that her actions had not been as severe as those of co-defendants Gerda Steinhoff or Jenny-Wanda Barkmann. Becker had been at the camp for the shortest amount of time. No pardon was issued, and she was publicly hanged on 4 July 1946 at Biskupia Górka along with the ten other condemned SS supervisors and kapos.

== In popular culture ==
- In the play Maidens, written and directed by Kenley Smith, Becker is portrayed by Megan Dianne DeWald.

== See also ==
- Female guards in Nazi concentration camps
