= Kolkau =

Kolkau was a subcamp of the German concentration camp Stutthof near Danzig during the Third Reich.
