= Julia Rodzińska =

Polish Roman Catholic nun and martyr

Maria Julia Rodzińska, OP (born Stanisława Maria Józefa Rodzińska; 16 March 1899 – 20 February 1945) was a Polish Dominican Sister and is venerated as a Blessed in the Roman Catholic Church.

== Life ==
Julia Rodzińska was born on 16 March 1899 in Nawojowa. She was one of five children of the organist Michał and Marianna née Sekuła. Rodzińska orphaned at the age of ten and became a ward of the Dominican Sisters convent in Nawojowa. There she finished school and then started her studies in the teachers' seminar in Nowy Sącz but didn't complete them because she began her religious formation in Wielowieś. At the age of 17, she entered the Congregation of the Sisters of St. Dominika in Tarnobrzeg-Wielowieś and there (5 August 1924) made her religious vows and completed her interrupted education.

As a qualified teacher, she carried out her ministry in Mielżyn, Rawa Ruska and Vilnius (from 13 December 1922, for 22 years). From 1934, she was the head of a house in Vilnius and ran an orphanage. After the outbreak of World War II, she secretly taught Polish language, history and religion, and conducted humanitarian activities. On 12 July 1943, Rodzińska was jailed by the Gestapo in Łukiszki prison in Vilnius. In a year, Rodzińska was sent to German concentration camp Stutthof, registered as number 40992. There she was subjected to torture, isolation and humiliation.

== Death and beatification ==
Rodzińska died of exhaustion and disease on 20 February 1945 in Stutthof, two months before the concentration camp was liberated by the Red Army. Her beatification process began on 26 January 1992. In 1999, she was proclaimed blessed by Pope John Paul II in a group of 108 blessed martyrs.

== Honors ==
Rodzińska is the patron of the primary school Blessed Julia Rodzińska in Nawojowa and kindergarten of Blessed Julia Rodzińska in Poznań. In 2019, on the occasion of 120th anniversary of Rodzińska's birthday her family home in Nawojowa was open for visitors.
