= Max Pauly =

SS officer (1907–1946)

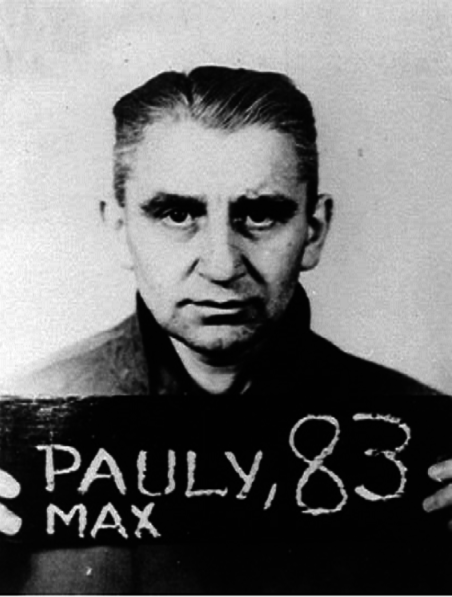
- Born: 1 June 1907; Wesselburen, German Empire
- Died: 8 October 1946 (aged 39); Hamelin Prison, Allied-occupied Germany
- Status: Executed by hanging
- Conviction: War crimes
- Penalty: Death
- Military career
- Allegiance: Nazi Germany
- Branch: Schutzstaffel; SS-Totenkopfverbände
- Rank: SS-Standartenführer

Max Pauly (1 June 1907 – 8 October 1946) was an SS-Standartenführer who was the commandant of Stutthof concentration camp from September 1939 to August 1942 and commandant of Neuengamme concentration camp and the associated subcamps from September 1942 until liberation in May 1945. He lived on site with his family. Prior to his assignment at the camps, Pauly had presided over the executions of Polish POWs captured after the Defence of the Polish Post Office in Danzig.

Pauly was tried by the British for war crimes with 13 others in the Curio Haus in Hamburg which was located in the British occupied sector of Germany. The trial lasted from 18 March to 13 May 1946. He was found guilty and sentenced to death with 11 other defendants. He was never tried for the crimes committed at Stutthof.

== Execution ==
Pauly was executed by hanging by Albert Pierrepoint in Hamelin Prison on 8 October 1946.

== Legacy ==
Pauly is mentioned under the name of "Hans" in Simon Wiesenthal's 1967 book, The Murderers Among Us (ch. 22, "The Other Side of the Moon").

== See also ==
- Sachsenhausen concentration camp
- SS Cap Arcona (1927) ocean liner
- Defense of the Polish Post Office in Danzig

== Notes and references ==
Military offices
Preceded by None	Commandant of Stutthof concentration camp September 1939 – August 1942	Succeeded by SS-Sturmbannführer Paul-Werner Hoppe
Preceded by SS-Hauptsturmführer Martin Gottfried Weiss	Commandant of Neuengamme concentration camp September 1942 – 4 May 1945	Succeeded by Camp liberated
