= Biskupia Górka =

- Neighbourhood of Gdańsk
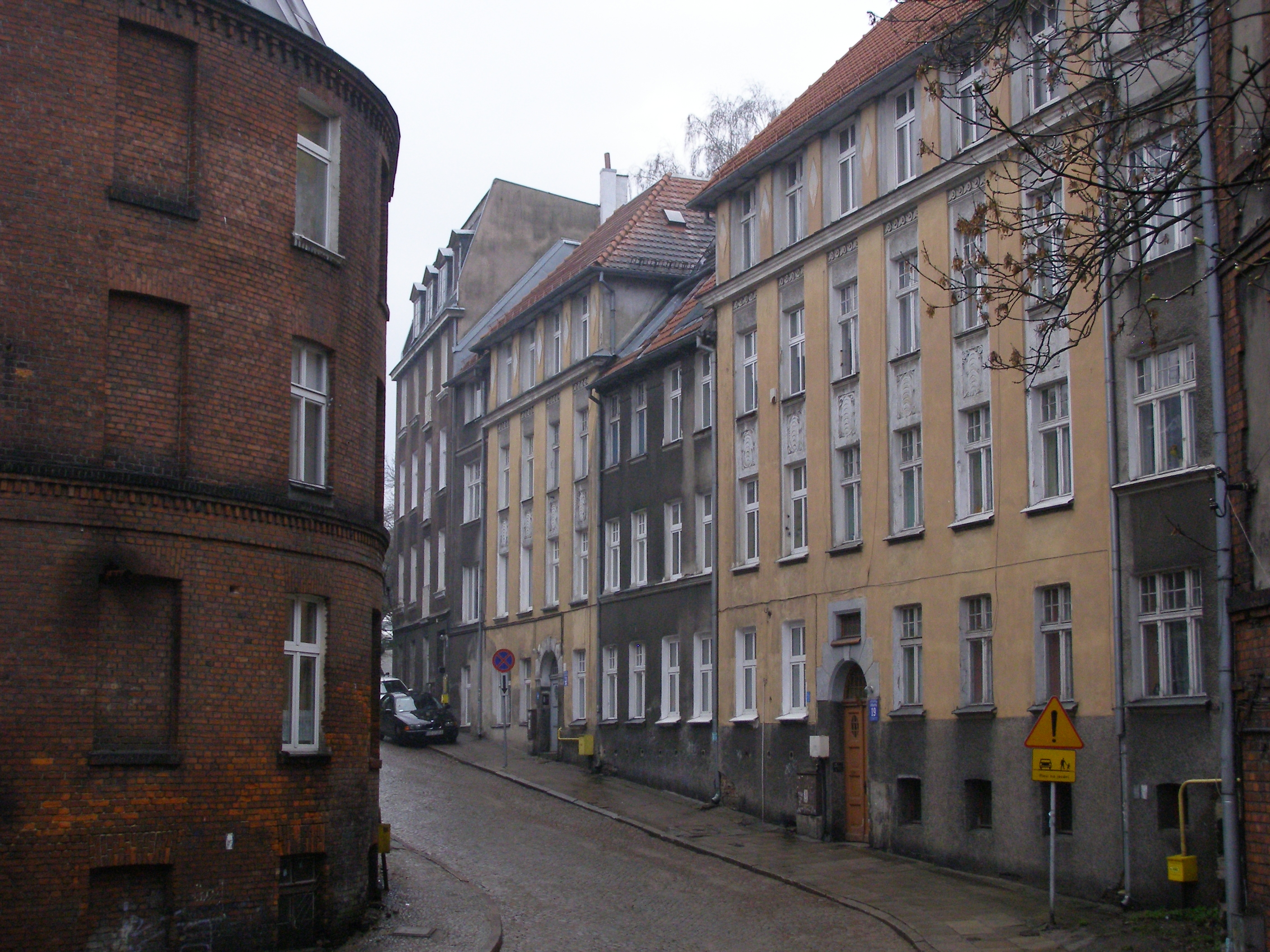
- Biskupia Street in Biskupia Górka

- Location of Biskupia Górka within Śródmieście, Gdańsk
- Coordinates: 54°20′37″N 18°38′18″E
- Country: Poland
- Voivodeship: Pomeranian
- County/City: Gdańsk
- District: Śródmieście
- Time zone: UTC+1 (CET)
  - Summer (DST): UTC+2 (CEST)
- Vehicle registration: GD

Historic Monument of Poland
- Designated: 1994-09-08
- Part of: Gdańsk – city within the 17th-century fortifications
- Reference no.: M.P. 1994 nr 50 poz. 415

Biskupia Górka (German: Bischofsberg, sometimes Bischofshügel) is a neighbourhood and hill in Gdańsk, Poland, located in the Śródmieście district. Historically, Biskupia Górka had important strategic meaning, since it is a hill close to the main city.

== History ==
As part of the Kingdom of Poland it was a possession of the Roman Catholic Diocese of Włocławek, administratively located in the Gdańsk County in the Pomeranian Voivodeship. Fortifications were built on the hill in the 17th century. After the Partitions of Poland, Polish insurgents of the November Uprising were imprisoned by the Prussians in the fortifications.

Following the German invasion of Poland, which started World War II in 1939, the Germans established a subcamp of the Stalag XX-A prisoner-of-war camp, in which Polish POWs were held. It was later converted into a subcamp of the Stalag XX-B camp, and its prisoners were mostly the French. Some 1,200 POWs were held there as of December 31, 1940.

On July 4, 1946, eleven guards and kapos of the Stutthof concentration camp were publicly hanged for what was described as "sadistic abuse of prisoners." Among those hanged were five women: Gerda Steinhoff, Wanda Klaff, Jenny-Wanda Barkmann, Ewa Paradies and Elisabeth Becker, all of whom had been convicted during the first Stutthof trial, at Gdańsk between April 25 and May 31, 1946.

The former Mennonite church is located in Biskupia Górka.

== See also ==
- Gdańsk Biskupia Górka (train station)
