= Malken Mierzynek =

Concentration camp in Poland

Malken Mierzynek was a subcamp of the Stutthof concentration camp (Sztutowo) near Danzig (Gdańsk) during the Third Reich.
