= Erna Beilhardt =

Nazi concentration camp guard

- Beilhardt arriving at her trial (1946)
- Born: 7 February 1907; Neuteich, German Empire
- Died: 1999 (aged 91–92); Wetter, Germany
- Occupations: Nurse, SS-Aufseherin
- Organization(s): German Red Cross; National Socialist People's Welfare
- Political party: Nazi Party
- Conviction: Membership in a criminal organization
- Trial: Stutthof trials
- Penalty: 5 years imprisonment
- SS career
- Allegiance: Nazi Germany
- Branch: Schutzstaffel (resigned)
- Service years: 11 October 1944 – 20 January 1945
- Unit: SS-Aufseherin

Erna Beilhardt (7 February 1907 – 1999) was a German female guard at Stutthof concentration camp during the Holocaust. A member of the SS-Aufseherin, or overseer, Beilhardt was also a nurse affiliated with the German Red Cross during the last year of World War II. According to Polish journalist Tomasz Chudzyński, Beilhardt is the only SS guard at Stutthof known to have voluntarily resigned from their position after receiving training.

Beilhardt still expressed some support for the Nazi ideology at her trial, albeit she stopped short of being willing to abuse or kill prisoners personally. She eventually resigned after growing increasingly disturbed by the cruelty of her fellow guards.

== Early life ==
Beilhardt was born in Neuteich (now Nowy Staw), near Danzig, on 7 February 1907. Her father died when she was seven years old. Beilhardt's mother, who came from a well-known family of Swiss dairy and cheesemakers who settled in the town, took care of the family by herself.

Due to her family's difficult financial situation, especially at the end of World War I, Beilhardt, who had just graduated from elementary school, went to East Prussia, where she found a job in agriculture. In 1927, Beilhardt moved to Danzig, where she lived with her sister and mother. Her mother opened a dairy warehouse in the town.

After moving to Danzig, Beilhardt completed her education at a two-year vocational school and worked as a housekeeper in an apartment with the factory director, Willi Lippert. Between 1930 and 1938, she stayed at home and helped her family run stores. During this time, Beilhardt became involved with the German Red Cross. In 1933, she joined the Nazi Party, seeing it as a way to advance her career.

During the war, Beilhardt underwent additional medical training and joined the NSV, the Nazi Party's welfare program. During her interrogation by Polish officials, Beilhardt said she liked her job since she got to help German orphans. She was eventually referred to the Stutthof concentration camp by an official of either the Nazi Party or the NSV in the regime's labour office.

== Stutthof career ==
Beilhardt arrived at Stutthof in August 1944 and was trained as an auxiliary guard (Hilfsaufseherin). She remained at the central Stutthof camp from 18 September 1944 until 11 October 1944, when she attended an overseer program for six weeks and was then moved to the Stutthof Heiligenbeil subcamp.

Beilhardt's time as a supervisor was highly unusual compared with other supervisors. Although she fulfilled the regular roles expected as a supervisor, she was not known to have personally beaten or killed any prisoners. Beilhardt became increasingly disturbed by watching her fellow overseers torture and kill prisoners. After six weeks, she decided to resign. On 20 January 1945, Beilhardt accompanied the evacuation of prisoners to Königsberg, where she performed nursing duties for wounded German soldiers under the German Red Cross.

On 14 July 1945, Beilhardt was working in Swinemünde when she was arrested by Soviet troops. She was accused during the first Stutthof trials (25 April – 31 May 1946) of the maltreatment of concentration camp prisoners. During her trial, Beilhardt spoke of her support for Nazism. "I liked the idea of our leader that the whole world would apply to us, that we stand victorious over all countries [...] I have been in the NSDAP since 1933." At the same time, however, Beilhardt said: "I did not like this work very much, because they tormented people too much, which I couldn't look at."

Due to her voluntary resignation and lack of direct involvement in the abuse or murder of any prisoners, Beilhardt was not sentenced for crimes against humanity. Instead, she received a five-year prison sentence for her membership in the Nazi Party and the SS, making her the only SS-Aufseherin from Stutthof to be convicted by a Polish court and avoid execution. Although Beilhardt completed her sentence in May 1951, she remained in prison for several more months. Beilhardt was released on 21 December 1951. She died in 1999.
