= Gdańsk Biskupia Górka railway station =

Railway station in Gdańsk, Poland

Coordinates: 54.3422°N 18.6436°E

Gdańsk Biskupia Górka
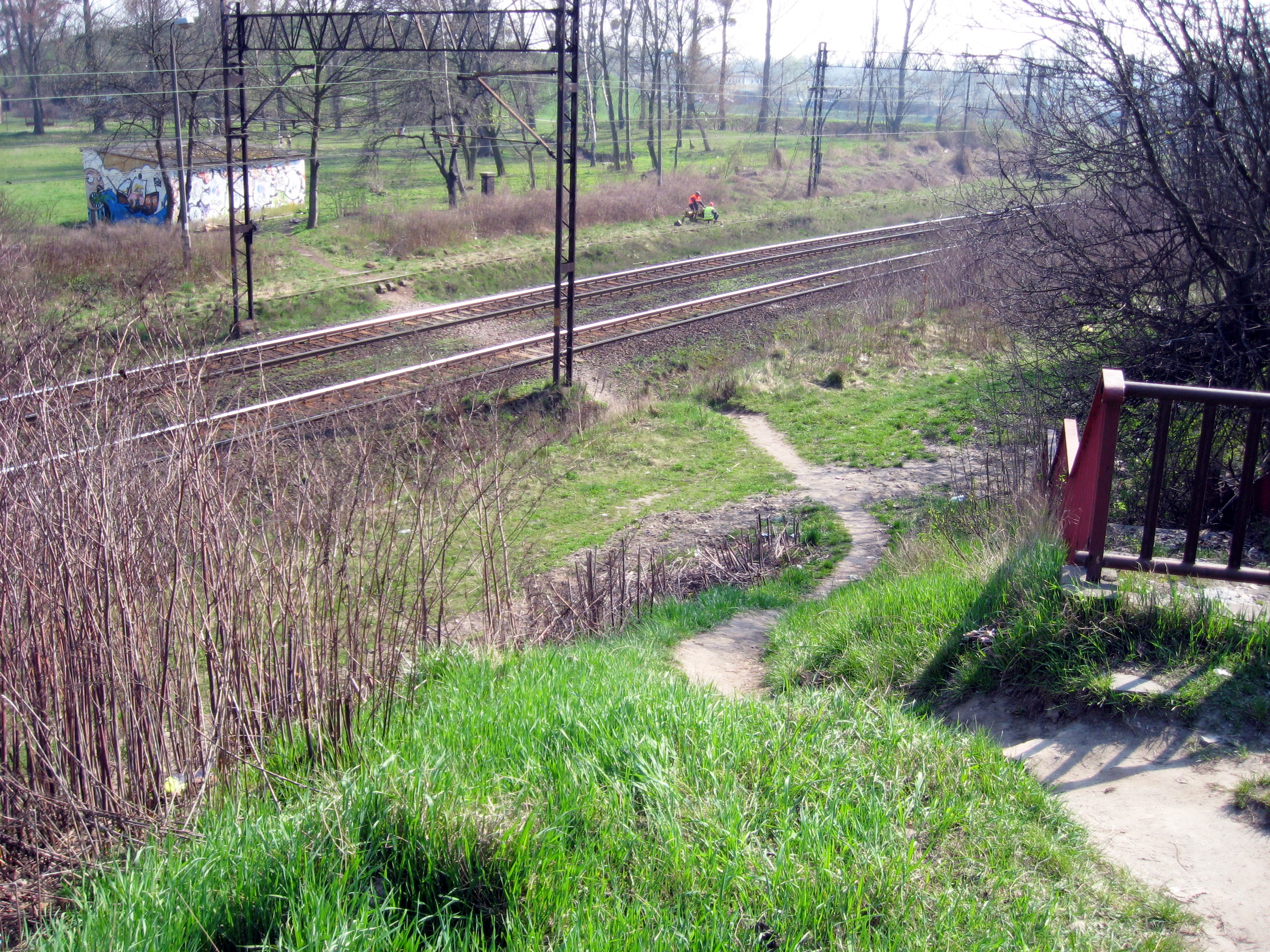

General information
- Location: None, Biskupia Górka, Gdańsk; Poland
- Owner: Polskie Koleje Państwowe S.A.
- Platforms: None

Construction
- Structure type: Building: Never existed Depot: Never existed Water tower: Never existed

History
- Opened: 1908
- Closed: 1965
- Former names: Gdańsk Piotrówko; Danzig Petershagen
Location

Gdańsk Biskupia Górka is a former railway station in Gdańsk, Poland, which existed between 1908 and 1965.

== Lines crossing the station ==
Start station	End station	Line type
Warszawa Wschodnia	Gdańsk Główny	Passenger/Freight
