= Life imprisonment in Poland =

Life imprisonment in Poland (Polish: Kara dożywotniego pozbawienia wolności) has an indeterminate length. It can be imposed for treason, the assassination of the Polish president, war of aggression, genocide, crimes against humanity, unlawful use of a weapon of mass destruction, war crimes, murder, homicide and serious bodily harm resulting in death.

Under the current Criminal Code, a person sentenced to life imprisonment may generally be conditionally released after serving 30 years, although the sentencing court may impose stricter limits or, in specified cases, prohibit conditional release. Since the reintroduction of life imprisonment in 1995, the highest minimum term is 50 years. By comparison, life sentences in Canada, with the 25-year minimum non-parole period, are mandatory for high treason and, in some cases, murder, while the highest minimum term is 75 years (a sentence a judge can hand down to some murderers convicted of multiple counts of murder). While the law does not explicitly provide for life without parole, life sentences in Poland with extensively long non-parole periods (such as 50 years, the maximum allowed) typically last beyond a normal life span, and this makes it almost certain that the convicted person will never be released from prison alive.

As of March 2007, 71 prisoners are serving a longer minimum term than 25 years: 39 convicts can apply for parole after 30 years, 24 after 35 years, 4 after 40 years and 2 after 50 years.

The President of Poland has the power to end the prisoner's life sentence by granting clemency at any time; however, this has never happened.

As of 2009, there are more than 200 people serving life sentences in Polish prisons. All were convicted of murder. If no changes in law are made, prisoners serving life imprisonment will first become eligible for parole in 2020.

For a person who was under the age of 18 at the time of any offense where the maximum penalty is life imprisonment, the maximum penalty is a term of 25 years' imprisonment, with eligibility for parole after a term of 15 years has been served. While life imprisonment exists in the country as the most severe punishment, its use as a punishment is never mandatory and is only handed down at the discretion of the court.
