= Stutthof concentration camp =

Nazi concentration camp in Poland (1939–1945)

Stutthof
- Nazi concentration camp
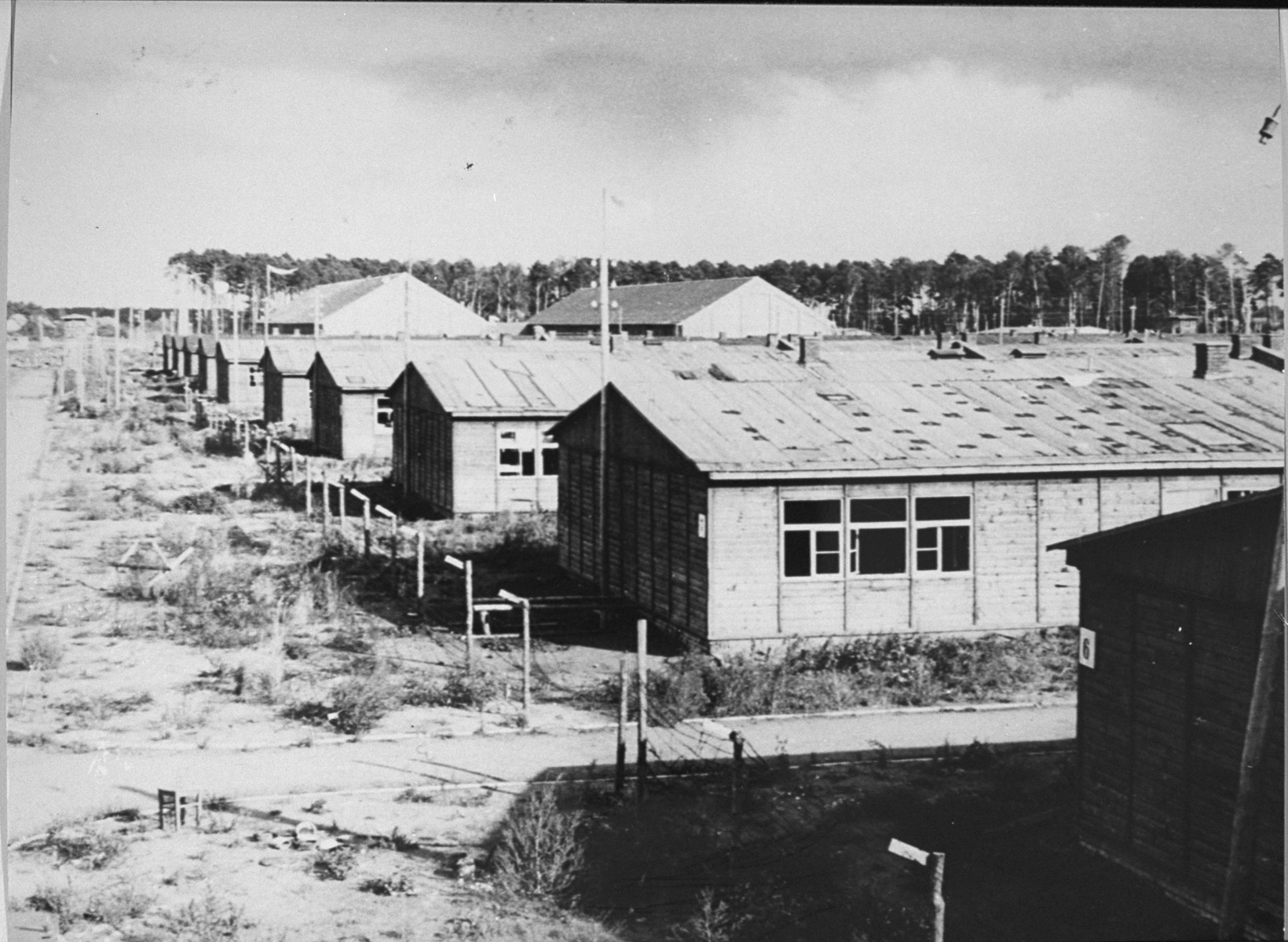
- Prisoner barracks after liberation

- Location of the former Stutthof concentration camp in Nazi Germany annexed Free City of Danzig
- Coordinates: 54°19′44″N 19°09′14″E
- Location: Stutthof, German-annexed Free City of Danzig (now Sztutowo, Nowy Dwór County, Pomeranian Voivodeship of northern Poland)
- Operated by: Nazi Germany
- Commandant: Max Pauly, September 1939 – August 1942; Paul-Werner Hoppe, August 1942 – January 1945
- Operational: 2 September 1939 – 9 May 1945
- Inmates: Poles, Jews, and political prisoners of various nationalities
- Number of inmates: 110,000
- Killed: 63,000 - 65,000 (including 28,000 Jews)
- Liberated by: Red Army

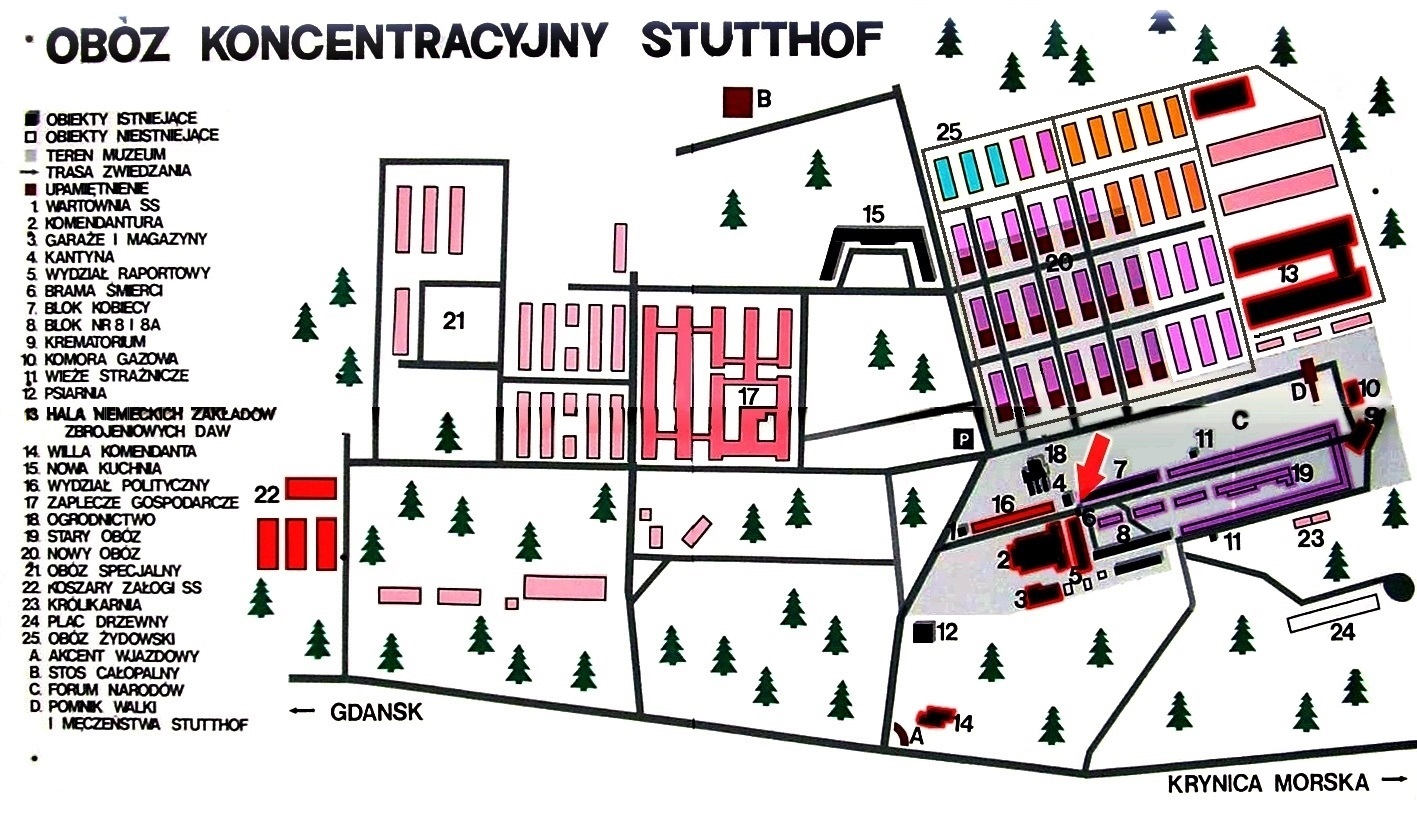
Map of the main camp after expansion. The German armaments factory DAW to the right (black, outlined in red) by the prisoner barracks. Death gate marked with an arrow, next to the red-brick SS administration building.

Stutthof was a Nazi concentration camp established by Nazi Germany in a secluded, marshy, and wooded area near the village of Stutthof (now Sztutowo, Pomeranian Voivodeship of northern Poland) 34 km (21 mi) east of the city of Danzig (Gdańsk) in the territory of the German-annexed Free City of Danzig. The camp was set up around existing structures after the invasion of Poland in World War II and initially used for the imprisonment of Polish leaders and intelligentsia. The actual barracks were built the following year by prisoners. Most of the infrastructure of the concentration camp was either destroyed or dismantled shortly after the war. In 1962, the former concentration camp with its remaining structures was turned into a memorial museum.

Stutthof was the first German concentration camp set up outside German borders in World War II, in operation from 2 September 1939. It was also the last camp liberated by the Allies, on 9 May 1945. It is estimated that between 63,000 and 65,000 prisoners of Stutthof concentration camp and its subcamps died as a result of murder, starvation, epidemics, extreme labour conditions, brutal and forced evacuations, and a lack of medical attention. Some 28,000 of those who died were Jews. In total, as many as 110,000 people were deported to the camp in the course of its existence. About 24,600 were transferred from Stutthof to other locations.

== Camp ==
The camp was established in connection with the ethnic cleansing project that included the liquidation of Polish elites (members of the intelligentsia, religious and political leaders) in the Danzig area and Western Prussia.

Even before the war began, the German Selbstschutz in Pomerania created lists of people to be arrested, and the Nazi authorities were secretly reviewing suitable places to set up concentration camps in their area.

Originally, Stutthof was a civilian internment camp under the Danzig police chief, before its subsequent massive expansion. In November 1941, it became a "labor education" camp (like Dachau), administered by the German Security Police. Finally, in January 1942, Stutthof became a regular concentration camp.

The original camp (known as the old camp) was surrounded by the barbed-wire fence. It comprised eight barracks for the inmates and a "Kommandantur" for the SS guards, totaling 120,000 square metres (1,300,000 sq ft). In 1943, the camp was enlarged and a new camp was constructed alongside the earlier one. It was also surrounded by electrified barbed-wire fence and contained thirty new barracks, raising the total area to 1.2 square kilometres (0.46 sq mi). A crematorium and gas chamber were added in 1943, just in time to start mass executions when Stutthof was included in the "Final Solution" in June 1944. Mobile gas wagons were also used to complement the maximum capacity of the gas chamber (150 people per execution) when needed.

=== Staff ===
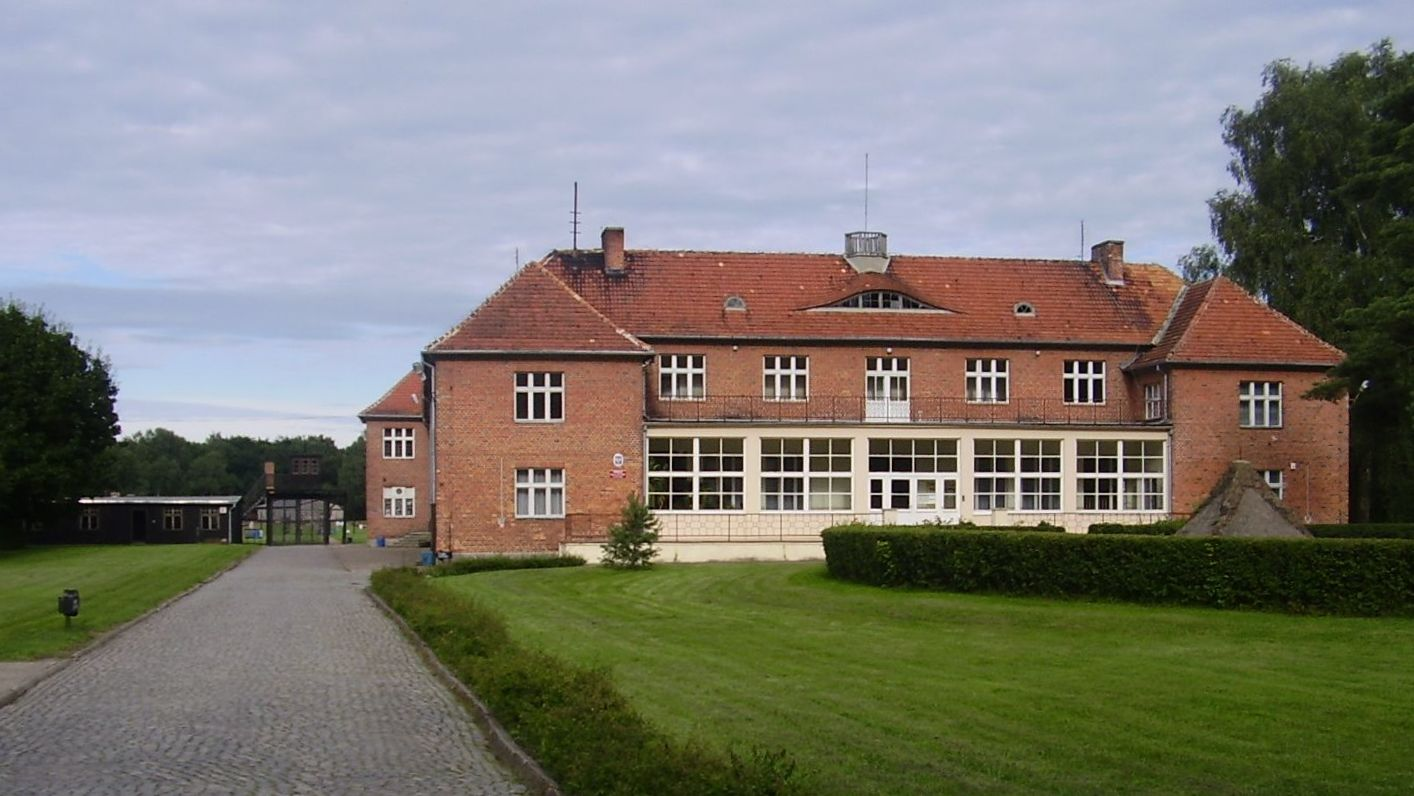
Stutthof concentration camp administration

The camp staff consisted of German SS guards and, after 1943, the Ukrainian auxiliaries brought in by SS-Gruppenführer Fritz Katzmann, the Higher SS and Police Leader of the area.

In 1942, the first German female SS Aufseherinnen guards arrived at Stutthof along with female prisoners. A total of 295 women guards worked as staff in the Stutthof complex of camps.

Among the notable female guard personnel were: Elisabeth Becker, Erna Beilhardt, Ella Bergmann, Ella Blank, Gerda Bork, Herta Bothe, Erna Boettcher, Hermine Boettcher-Brueckner, Steffi Brillowski, Charlotte Graf, Charlotte Gregor, Charlotte Klein, Gerda Steinhoff, Ewa Paradies, and Jenny-Wanda Barkmann. Thirty-four female guards including Becker, Bothe, Steinhoff, Paradies, and Barkmann were identified later as having committed crimes against humanity. The SS in Stutthof began conscripting women from Danzig and the surrounding cities in June 1944, to train as camp guards because of their severe shortage after the women's subcamp of Stutthof called Bromberg-Ost (Konzentrationslager Bromberg-Ost) was set up in the city of Bydgoszcz.

Several Norwegian Waffen SS volunteers worked as guards or as instructors for prisoners from Nordic countries, according to senior researcher at the Norwegian Center for Studies of Holocaust and Religious Minorities, Terje Emberland.

=== Prisoners ===
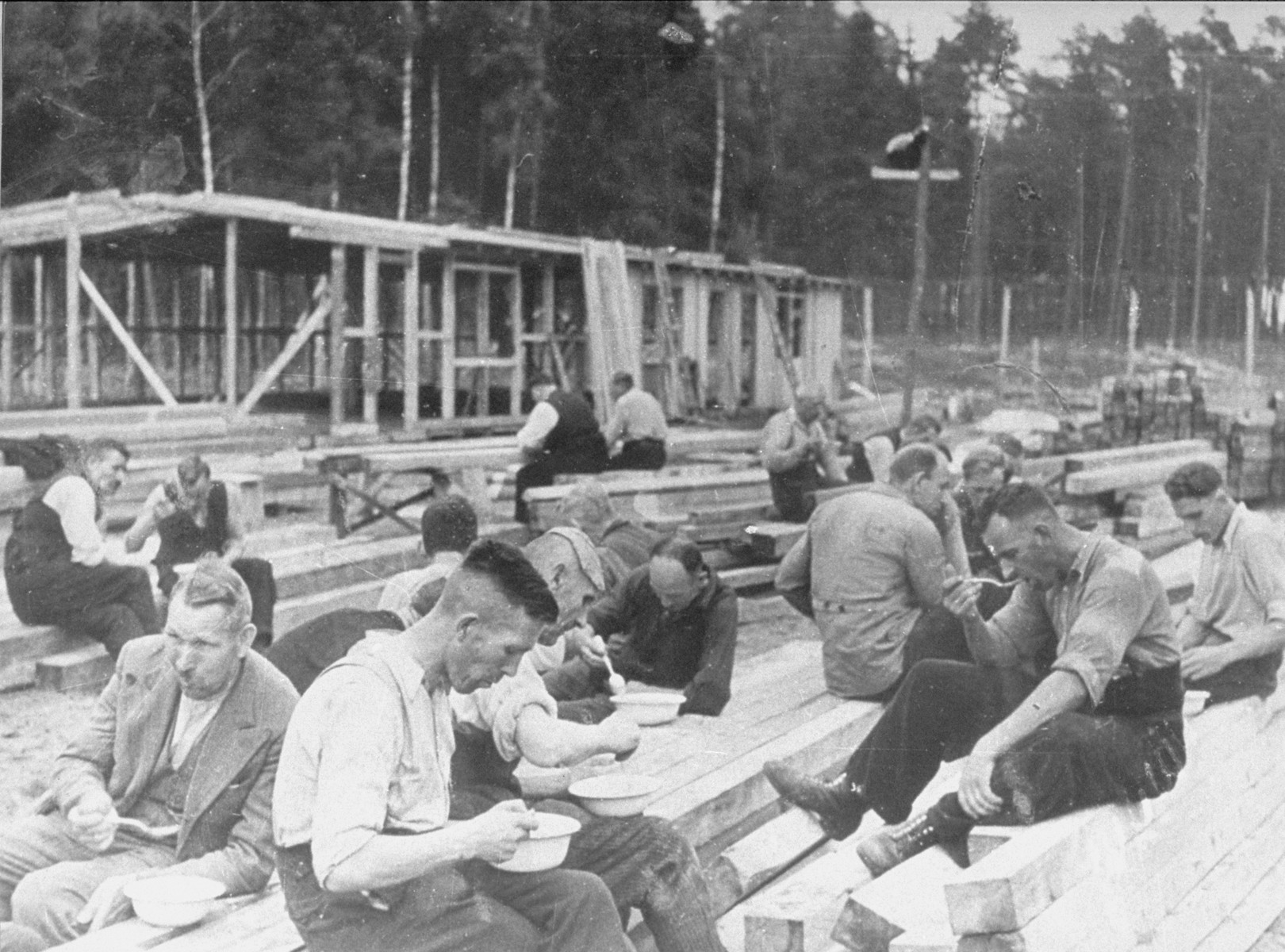
Stutthof prisoners eat during a break in the construction of the camp, October 1939.

The first 150 inmates, imprisoned on 2 September 1939, were selected among Poles and Jews arrested in Danzig immediately after the outbreak of war. The inmate population rose to 6,000 in the following two weeks, on 15 September 1939. Until 1942, nearly all of the prisoners were Polish. The number of inmates increased considerably in 1944, with Jews forming a significant proportion of the newcomers. The first contingent of 2,500 Jewish prisoners arrived from Auschwitz in July 1944. In total, 23,566 Jews (including 21,817 women) were transferred to Stutthof from Auschwitz, and 25,053 (including 16,123 women) from camps in the Baltic states. When the Soviet army began its advance through German-occupied Estonia in July and August 1944, the camp staff of Klooga concentration camp evacuated the majority of the inmates by sea and sent them to Stutthof. Other sources say that the camp staff shot most remaining inmates in a mass murder.

Stutthof's registered inmates included citizens of 28 countries, and besides Jews and Poles – Germans, Czechs, Dutch, Belgians, French, Norwegians, Finns, Danes, Lithuanians, Latvians, Belarusians, Russians, and others. There were also those classed and condemned as "vagrants who travel around after the manner of the gypsies", a category that included Romani, Sinti and Yenish people.

Among 110,000 prisoners were Jews from all over Europe, members of the Polish underground, Polish civilians deported from Warsaw during the Warsaw Uprising, Lithuanian and Latvian intelligentsia, Latvian resistance fighters, psychiatric patients, Soviet prisoners of war, and Communists (as an example of Communist deportations to Stutthof, see the Danish Horserød camp). One prominent inmate and survivor of the Stutthof concentration camp was a member of parliament for the Communist Party of Denmark Martin Nielsen, who detailed his deportation to, experience in and ensuing death march from the camp in his book Rapport fra Stutthof ('Report from Stutthof'). Another prominent inmate was Lithuanian professor and writer Balys Sruoga who also survived since 1943 and detailed his time in camp including death march (ca 60 km 2-day trip during 1945 winter in the snow to Żukowo and then 50 km to Lębork) writing a book in 1945 Forest of the Gods. It is believed that inmates sent for immediate execution were not registered.

=== Conditions ===
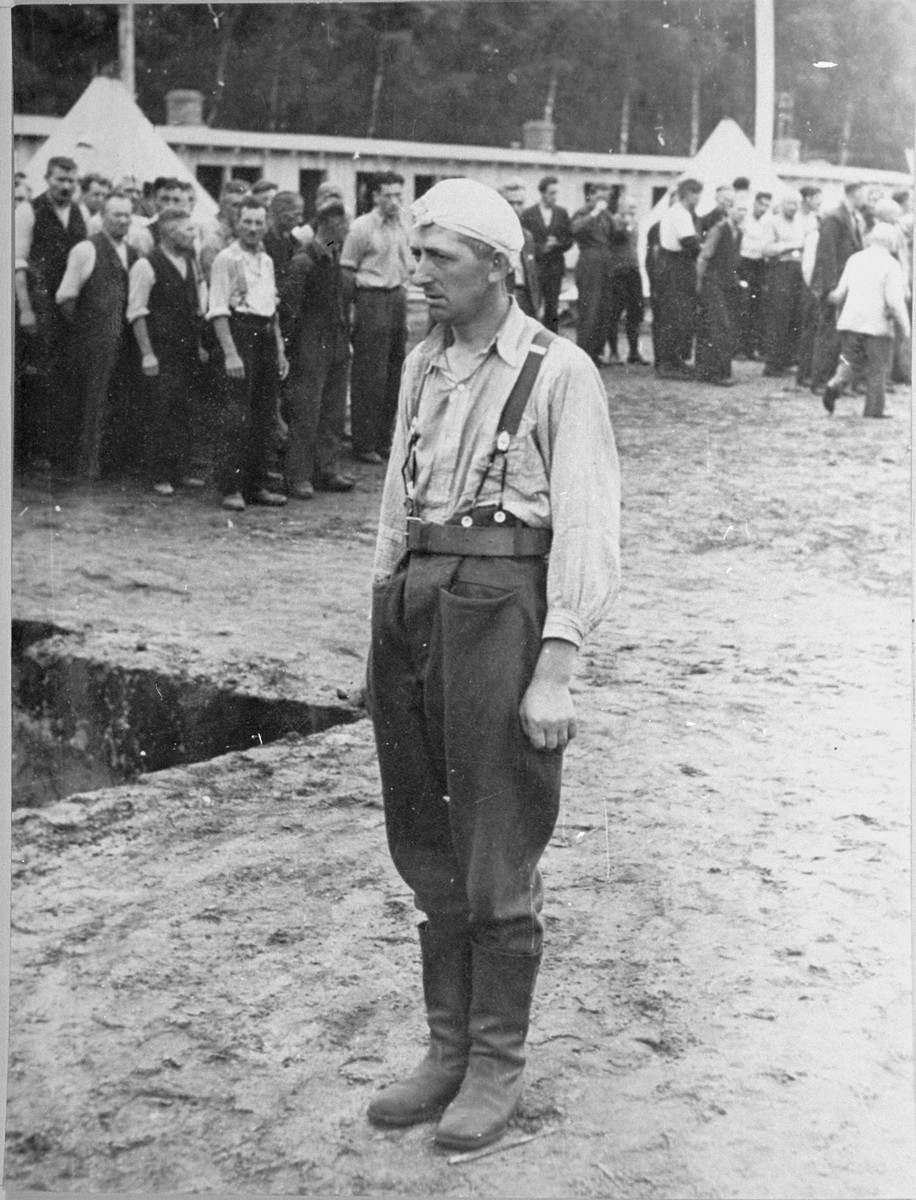
A Polish POW stands at attention in the Appellplatz at Stutthof, October 1939.

Conditions in the camp were extremely harsh; tens of thousands of prisoners succumbed to starvation and disease. Many died in typhus epidemics that swept the camp in the winter of 1942 and again in 1944; those whom the SS guards judged too weak or sick to work were gassed in the camp's small gas chamber. The first executions were carried out on 11 January and 22 March 1940 – 89 Polish activists and government officials were shot. Gassing with Zyklon B began in June 1944. 4,000 prisoners, including Jewish women and children, were killed in a gas chamber before the evacuation of the camp. Another method of execution practiced in Stutthof was lethal injection of phenol. Prisoners were also drowned in mud or clubbed to death. A Yenish survivor recalls that his mother, having given birth in the KZ, was made to witness her newborn being cast into the incinerator. Between 63,000 and 65,000 people died in the camp.

A range of German organisations and individuals used Stutthof prisoners as forced laborers. Many prisoners worked in SS-owned businesses such as DAW (Deutsche Ausrüstungswerke, literally the 'German Equipment Works'), the heavily guarded armaments factory located inside the camp next to prisoner barracks. Other inmates labored in local brickyards, in private industrial enterprises, in agriculture, or in the camp's own workshops. In 1944, as forced labor by concentration camp prisoners became increasingly important in armaments production, a Focke-Wulf aircraft factory was constructed at Stutthof. Eventually, the Stutthof camp system became a network of forced-labor camps. The Holocaust Encyclopedia estimates that (less officially) some 105 Stutthof subcamps were established throughout northern and central Poland. The major subcamps were in Toruń (Thorn) and in Elbląg (Elbing).

=== Solidarity and religious observance: memoirs of Helen Lewis ===
In the recollection of Helena Katz (Helen Lewis), who in August 1944 had arrived with a group of three hundred women from the family camp at Auschwitz-Birkenau, there was a sharp division among Jewish women in her Kochstädt sub camp outside Praust. Her group, whose ordeal had begun in the Theresienstadt Ghetto, were from German-speaking, broadly assimilationist, backgrounds in the Reich and occupied Czechoslovakia (Katz was a professional dancer from Prague). The group of five hundred women who had preceded them from Poland, the Baltic states, Hungary and Romania, spoke Yiddish, and "bitterly resented" both the newcomers' "lack of religious ardour" and the privilege they had enjoyed in retaining their unshaven hair.

In a devotional act that may have taken different forms elsewhere in the Stutthof camp system, the gulf between the two groups was bridged when together they committed to fast in honour of Yom Kippur (26 September 1944). Notwithstanding the administration's retaliatory threat of no food or drink for 36 hours, the women did not break ranks: food was refused. It was a victory in a "battle of wills" that, perversely, was rewarded by their SS commandant (Oberaufseherin) (a woman who had made known her personal involvement in the extermination of children from the Riga Ghetto) with a post-fast meal complete with sweet pudding.

Unexpected rations were again available, two months later, when the Oberaufseherin encouraged Katz and her fellow inmates to stage Christmas and New Year reviews featuring dramatic sketches, music, singing, and (with Katz performing) dancing. The "quirky" indulgences came to an end on 27 January 1945 when, in advance of approaching Soviet forces, all those in a condition to walk out were marched out of the camp. Those left behind in Kochstädt, the sick and the dying, where cared for by a new SS commandant, a former teacher who, from his arrival in camp, had been secretly feeding and protecting prisoners. Once the camp was liberated, his former charges saved him from Soviet retribution.

== Death march ==
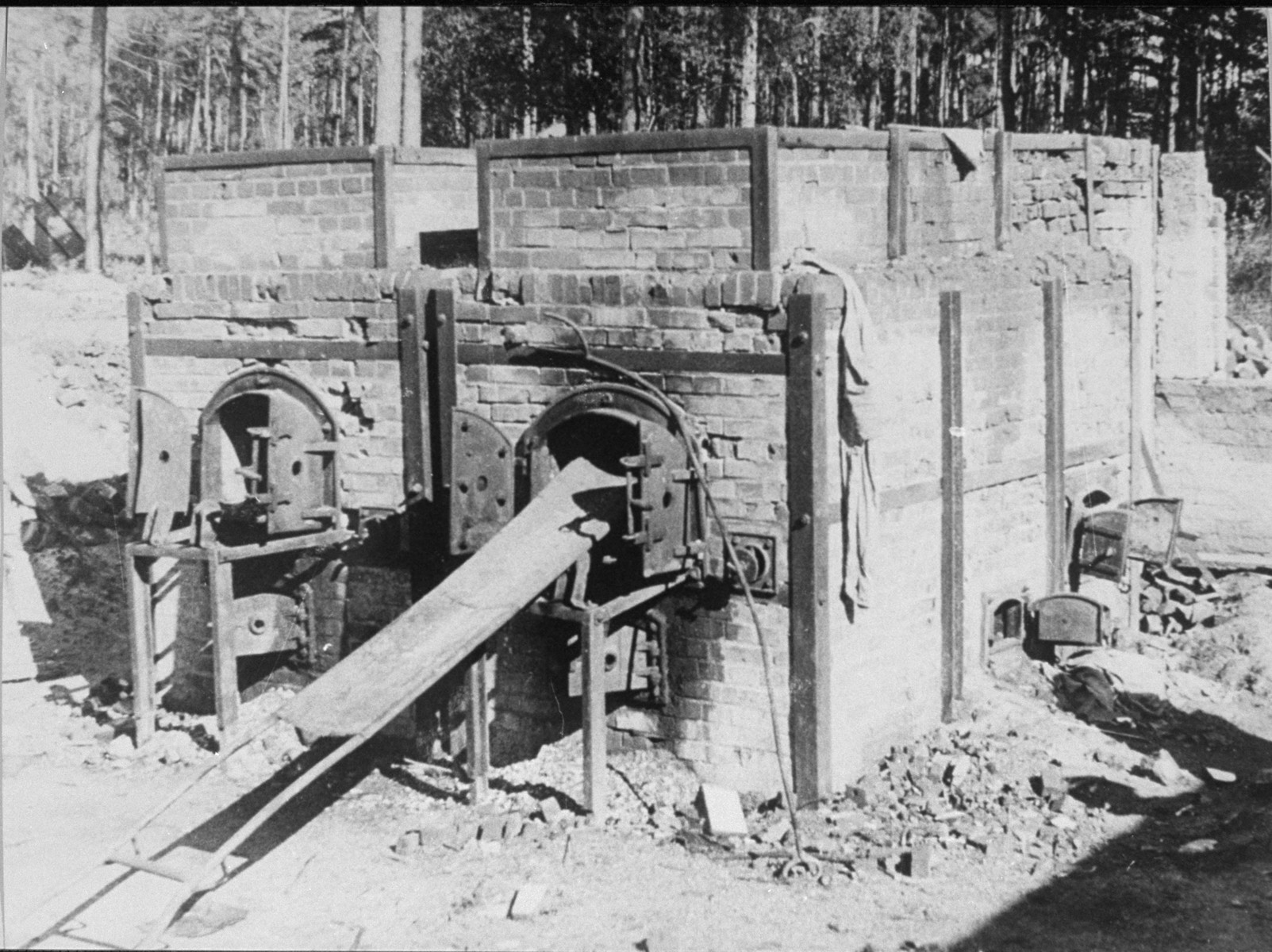
Two crematoria of Stutthof, photographed after liberation

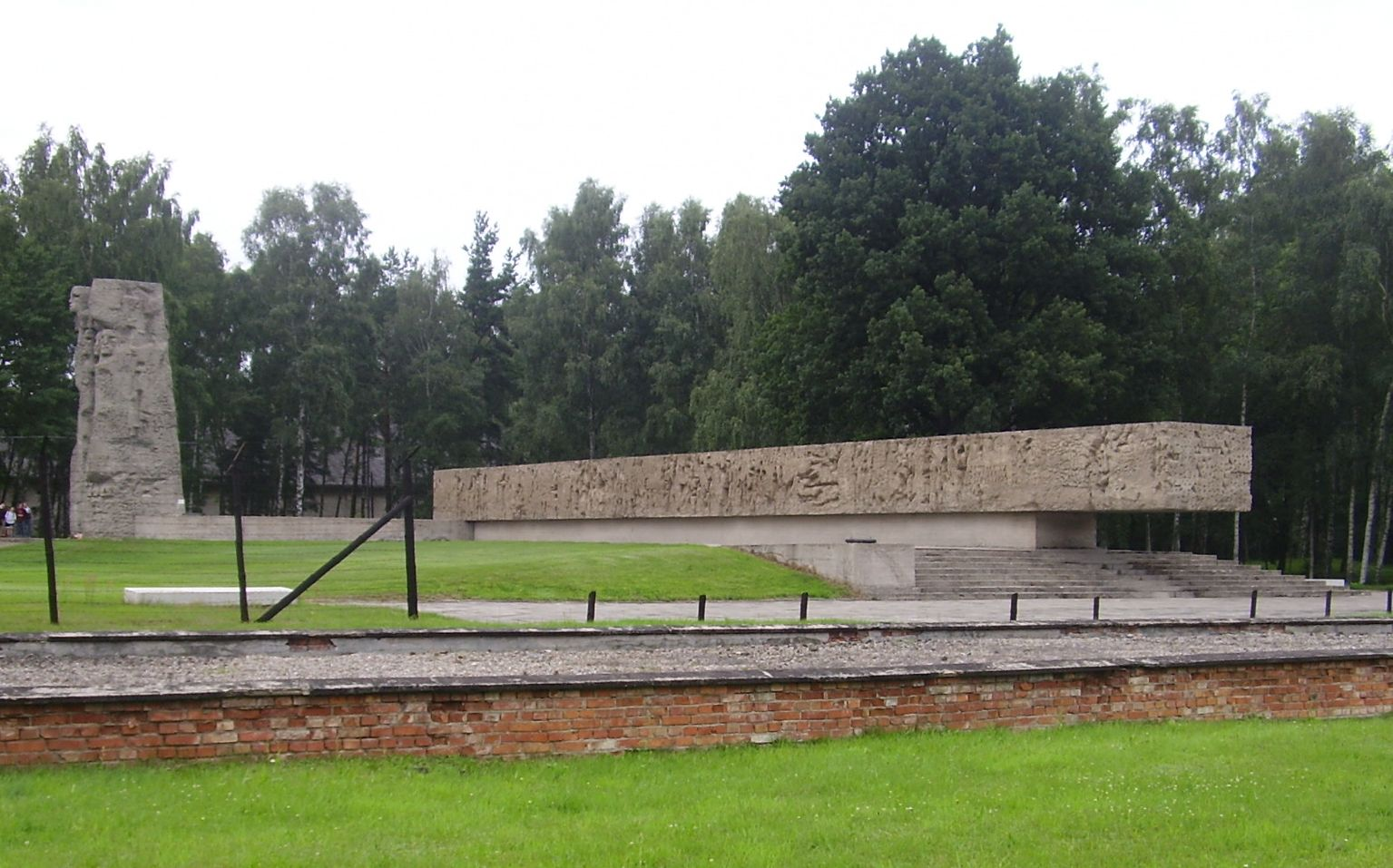
Camp memorial

The general evacuation Stutthof camp system had begun on 25 January 1945. Swept during the winter by typhus, there were some 50,000 surviving prisoners. After about 5,000 prisoners from the subcamps had been forced into the Baltic Sea and machine gunned, the remainder were marched west toward Lauenburg. Cut off by advancing Soviet forces, the Germans forced them back to Stutthof, with thousands dying or being shot on route.

In late April 1945, the remaining prisoners were removed from Stutthof by sea, since the camp was completely encircled by Soviet forces. Again, hundreds of prisoners were forced into the sea and shot. Over 4,000 were sent by small boat to Germany, some to the Neuengamme concentration camp near Hamburg, and some to other camps along the Baltic coast.

On 5 May 1945, a barge full of starving prisoners was towed into harbour at Klintholm Havn in Denmark where 351 of the 370 on board were saved. Shortly before the German surrender, some prisoners were transferred to Malmö, Sweden, and released into the care of that neutral country. It has been estimated that around half of the evacuated prisoners, over 25,000, died during the evacuation from Stutthof and its subcamps.

Soviet forces liberated Stutthof on 9 May 1945, rescuing about 100 prisoners who had managed to hide.

== Stutthof trials ==
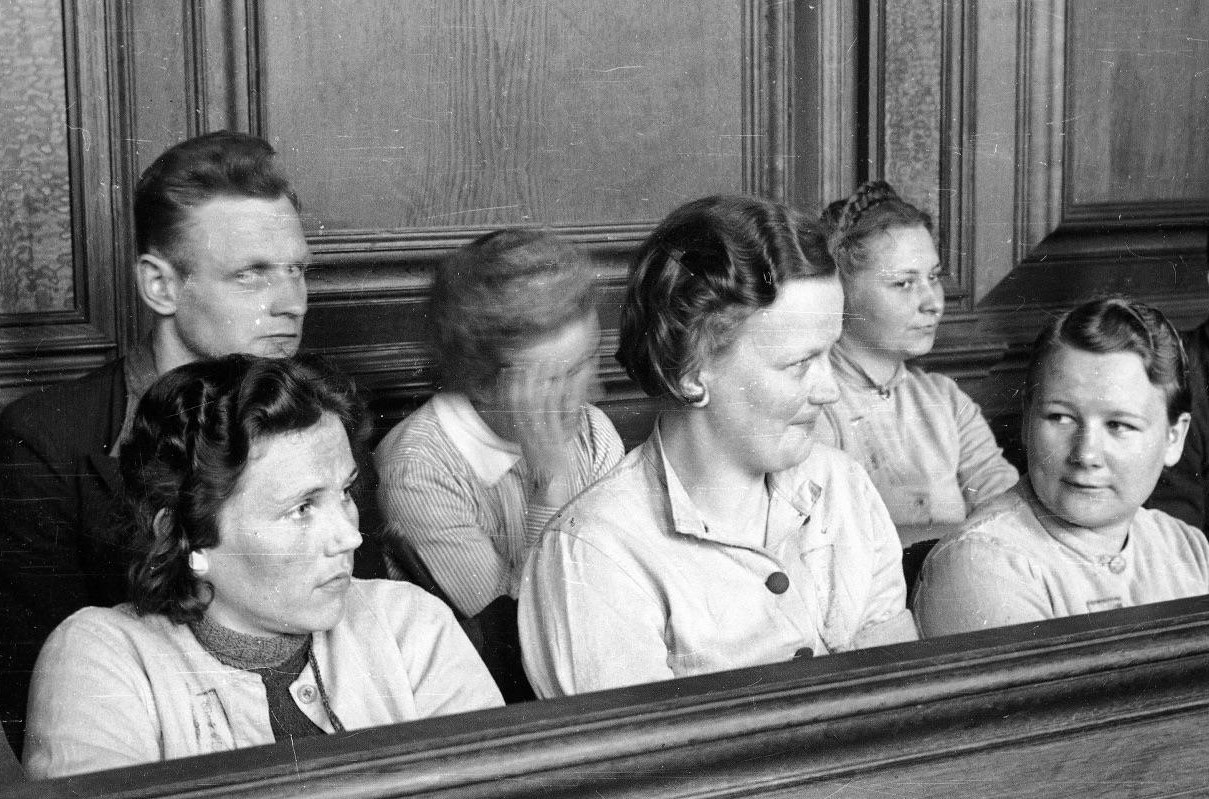
First row from left to right: Elisabeth Becker, Gerda Steinhoff, Wanda Klaff; second row: Erna Beilhardt, Jenny-Wanda Barkmann

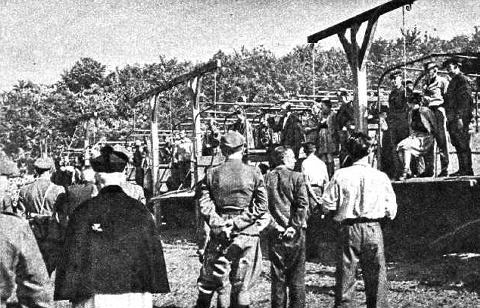
The execution of the SS overseers of the Stutthof concentration camp: Becker, Klaff, Steinhoff, and Pauls on 4 July 1946, with priest

The well-known Nuremberg Trials were only concerned with concentration camps as evidence for war crimes and crimes against humanity committed by the Third Reich leadership. Several lesser known trials followed against the staff of various concentration camps. Poland held four trials in Gdańsk against former guards and kapos of Stutthof, charging them with crimes of war and crimes against humanity.

The first trial was held from 25 April to 31 May 1946, against 30 ex-officials and prisoner-guards of the camp. The Soviet/Polish Special Criminal Court found all of them guilty of the charges. Eleven defendants including the former commander, Johann Pauls, were sentenced to death. The rest were sentenced to various terms of imprisonment.

The second trial was held from 8 October to 31 October 1947, before a Polish Special Criminal Court. The arraigned 24 ex-officials and guards of the Stutthof concentration camp were judged and found guilty. Ten were sentenced to death.

The third trial was held from 5 November to 10 November 1947, before a Polish Special Criminal Court. Arraigned were 20 ex-officials and guards judged; 19 then found guilty, with one acquitted.

The fourth and final trial was also held before a Polish Special Criminal Court, from 19 November to 29 November 1947. Twenty-seven ex-officials and guards were arraigned and judged; 26 were found guilty, and one was acquitted.

An additional trial was attempted in November 2018, when Johann Rehbogen was accused of being an accessory to murder. There was no evidence to link him to specific killings, and though he admitted to serving at the camp, he said that he was unaware that people were being murdered there. He was charged as a juvenile, as he was under 21 at the time of the offense. Images in the news broadcasts concealed his face for legal reasons. Being tried at the age of 94, court proceedings were limited to no more than two hours per day and two non-consecutive days per week. In February 2019, the trial of a defendant matching this description (whom Reuters reported could not be named for legal reasons) was halted after a medical report was issued stating that the defendant was unfit to stand trial, the trial already having been suspended since the previous December.

Another Nazi camp guard, Bruno Dey from Hamburg, was charged in October 2019 with contributing to the killings of 5,230 prisoners at Stutthof camp between 1944 and 1945. He was tried in a juvenile court due to having been about 17 at that time. On 23 July 2020, he was given a two-year suspended sentence by the court in Hamburg.

In July 2021, a 96-year-old German secretary, Irmgard Furchner, who had been part of KZ Stutthof was arrested to be tried for war crimes. On 28 September 2021, Frau Furchner left her home in Hamburg and failed to appear for her hearing. She was arrested on 30 September 2021 and the hearing was rescheduled for 19 October 2021. On 20 December 2022, Furchner, then 97, was convicted of being an accessory to murder of more than 10,000 people at Stutthof concentration camp during World War II. A two-year suspended sentence in line with that requested by prosecutors was handed down by the Itzehoe state court in northern Germany. On 20 August 2024, the German Federal Court of Justice upheld Furchner's conviction.

Josef Salomonovic, who arrived at Stutthof in June 1944 from Auschwitz just before his sixth birthday, was the only survivor to give evidence in person at the Furchner trial. He described Stutthof, where his father was murdered by phenol injection, as the worst of the several camps through which he and his family had passed. Asia Shindelman, who arrived in Stutthof in July 1944 aged 16, testified from the United States via video link to prisoners being thrown by guards into electrified fences.

== Alleged human soap production ==
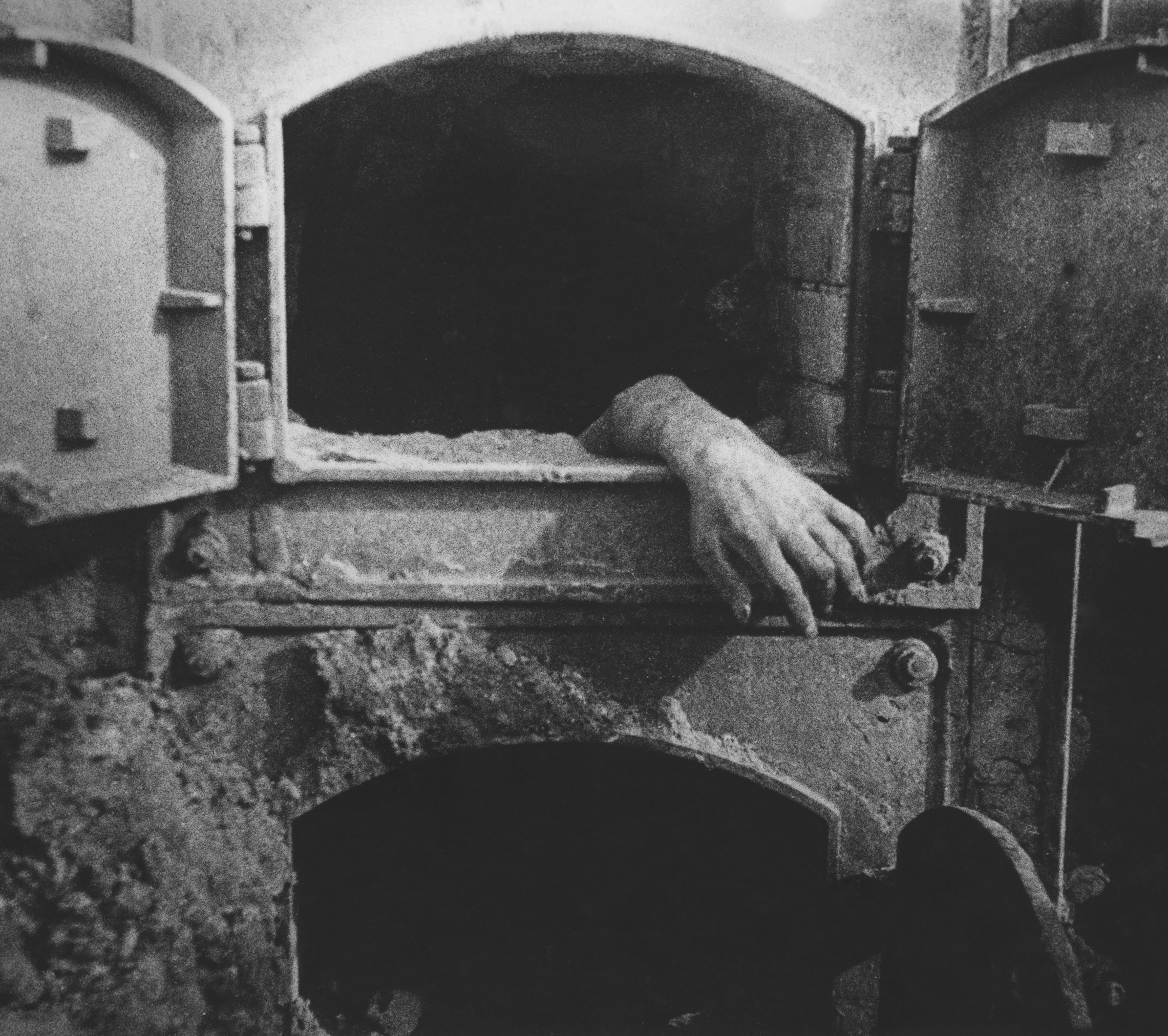
Stutthof crematoria after liberation, 9 May 1945

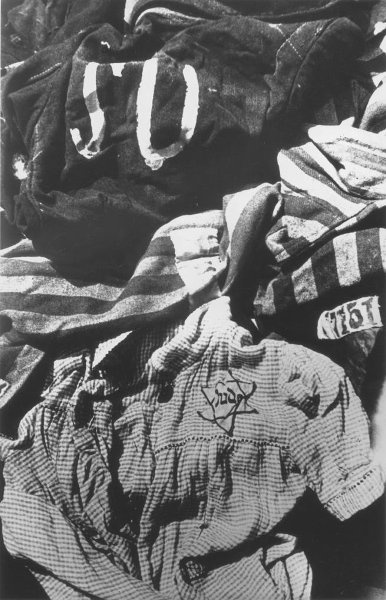
Clothes of victims of Stutthof concentration camp, 9 May 1945

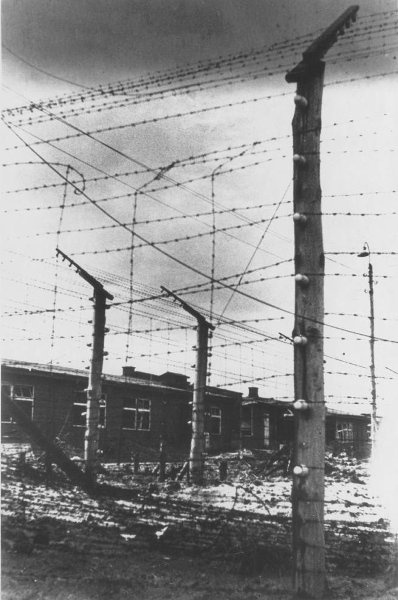
Electrified barbed wire fences at Stutthof, 9 May 1945

There was a controversy regarding whether corpses from Stutthof were used in the production of soap made from human corpses at the lab of Professor Rudolf Spanner.

Historian Joachim Neander argued that, contrary to some claims made in previous years, what the Institute of National Remembrance (IPN) calls the "chemical substance which was essentially soap" was the byproduct of Spanner's bone maceration processes done to create anatomical models at the Danzig Anatomical Institute, where he worked and which was not part of the Stutthof camp. The corpses used for this were not "harvested" bodies, and the byproduct of Spanner's work at the Danzig institute was collected. This was conflated with the separate debunked rumours of industrial production of human soap in concentration camps, which circulated during the war, and thereafter used as proof of this during the Nuremberg trials.

Polish historians and employees at the IPN, Monika Tomkiewicz and Piotr Semków, reached similar conclusions. Semków states that the presence of human fat tissue has been confirmed in the samples of soapy grease (claimed to be "unfinished soap") from Danzig presented during the trials through analysis performed by the IPN and Gdańsk University of Technology in 2011 and 2006, respectively, but his and Tomkiewicz research concluded that this was a byproduct stemming from Spanner's work in bone maceration at the institute unrelated to the Stutthof camp. Spanner was unlikely to have "really occupied himself with the production of usable soap from human fat", and that any soap production in his laboratory was likely marginal. It was also added that Spanner was arrested twice after the war but released after each time after explaining how he had conducted the maceration and injection process of his models and was declared "clean" by the denazification program in 1948, officially exonerated, and resumed his academic career.

== Sub-camps ==
The main German concentration camp in Stutthof had as many as 40 sub-camps during World War II. In total, the sub-camps held 110,000 prisoners from 25 countries. The sub-camps of Stutthof included:

1. Bottschin in Bocień
2. Bromberg-Ost in Bydgoszcz
3. DAG Factory in Bydgoszcz
4. Bruss (Brusy)
5. Chorabie (Chorab)
6. Cieszyny
7. Danzig–Burggraben in Kokoszki
8. Danzig–Holm (Gdańsk–Ostrów Island)
9. Danzig–Neufahrwasser (Gdańsk–Nowy Port)
10. Danziger Werft in Gdańsk
11. Dzimianen (Dziemiany)
12. Außenstelle Elbing in Elbląg
13. Elbing / Org. Todt (Elbląg)
14. Elbing / Schichau-Werke (Elbląg)
15. Pölitz (Police near Szczecin)
16. Gotenhafen in Gdynia
17. Gdynia-Orłowo
18. Außenarbeitslager Gerdauen (Zheleznodorozhny)
19. Graudenz in Grudziądz
20. Grenzdorf in Graniczna Wieś
21. Grodno
22. Gutowo
23. Gwisdyn in Gwiździny
24. KL Heiligenbeil (Mamonovo)
25. Hopehill in Nadbrzeże
26. Jesau/Juschny, Russia
27. Kolkau
28. Königsberg in Kaliningrad
29. Krummensee
30. Lauenburg (Lębork)
31. Matzkau in Maćkowy (now within city limits of Gdańsk)
32. Malken Mierzynek
33. Mikoszewo
34. Camp Nawitz in Nawitz/Nawcz
35. Niskie
36. Obrzycko
37. Pelplin
38. Potulitz in Potulice
39. Praust/Pruszcz Gdański
40. Przebrno
41. Russoschin in Rusocin
42. Brodnica
43. Schichau-Werft in Gdańsk
44. Schirkenpass (Scherokopas)
45. Schippenbeil/Sępopol, Poland
46. Seerappen/Lyublino, Russia
47. Sophienwalde
48. Stolp/Słupsk
49. Preußisch Stargard (Starogard Gdański)
50. Susz
51. Thorn (AEG, Org. Todt) in Toruń
52. Westerplatte in Gdańsk
53. Wiślinka
54. Zeyersniederkampen in Kępiny Wielkie

== Commandants ==
The camp had two commanders:

- SS-Sturmbannführer Max Pauly, September 1939 – August 1942
- SS-Sturmbannführer Paul-Werner Hoppe, August 1942 – January 1945

== Filming location ==
In 1999, Artur Żmijewski filmed a group of nude people playing tag in one of the Stutthof gas chambers, sparking outrage.

== Notable inmates ==
=== Survivors ===
- Reidar Kvammen, Norwegian international football player
- Helen Lewis (née Katz), Czech dancer, choreographer (memoir: A Time to Speak).
- Martin Nielsen (politician), Danish politician and member of parliament
- Ingrid Pitt, Polish-British actress, author, and writer

=== Murdered or died as a result ===
- Eva Mamlok, German anti-fascist and Jewish resistance fighter
- Julia Rodzińska, Dominican Sister, blessed of the Catholic Church
- Balys Sruoga, Lithuanian poet playwright, critic, and literary theorist. The memoir of his experiences in the camp Forest of the Gods was published posthumously
- Thøger Thøgersen, Danish politician

== See also ==
- Female guards in Nazi concentration camps
- List of Nazi concentration camps
- Nazi crimes against ethnic Poles
- Rescue of Stutthof victims in Denmark
