= Paul-Werner Hoppe =

SS-Obersturmbannführer & commandant of Stutthof concentration camp

- Born: 28 February 1910 Berlin, German Empire
- Died: 15 July 1974 (aged 64) Bochum, West Germany
- Allegiance: Nazi Germany
- Branch: Waffen-SS; SS-Totenkopfverbände
- Rank: SS-Obersturmbannführer

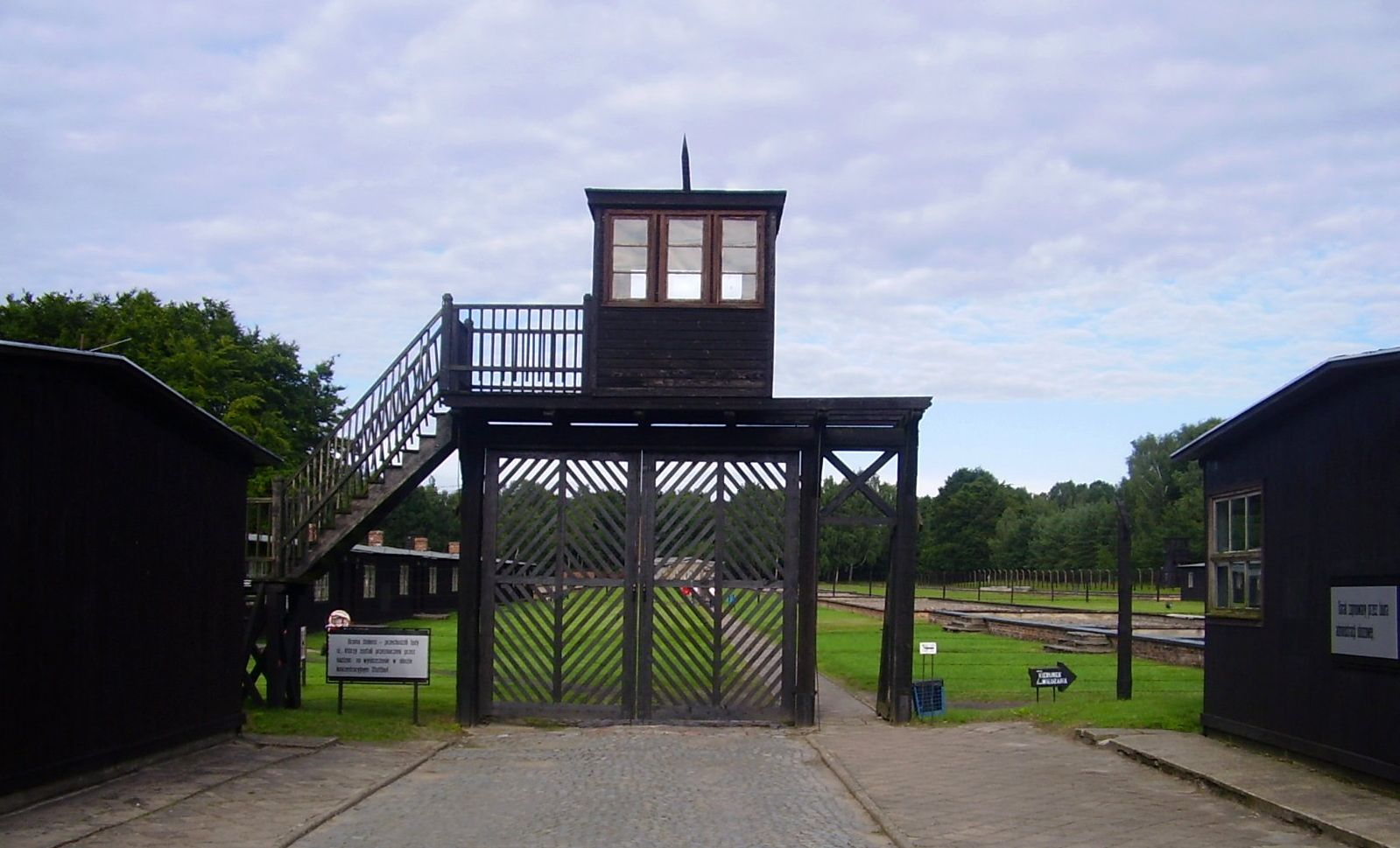
Entrance to Stutthof

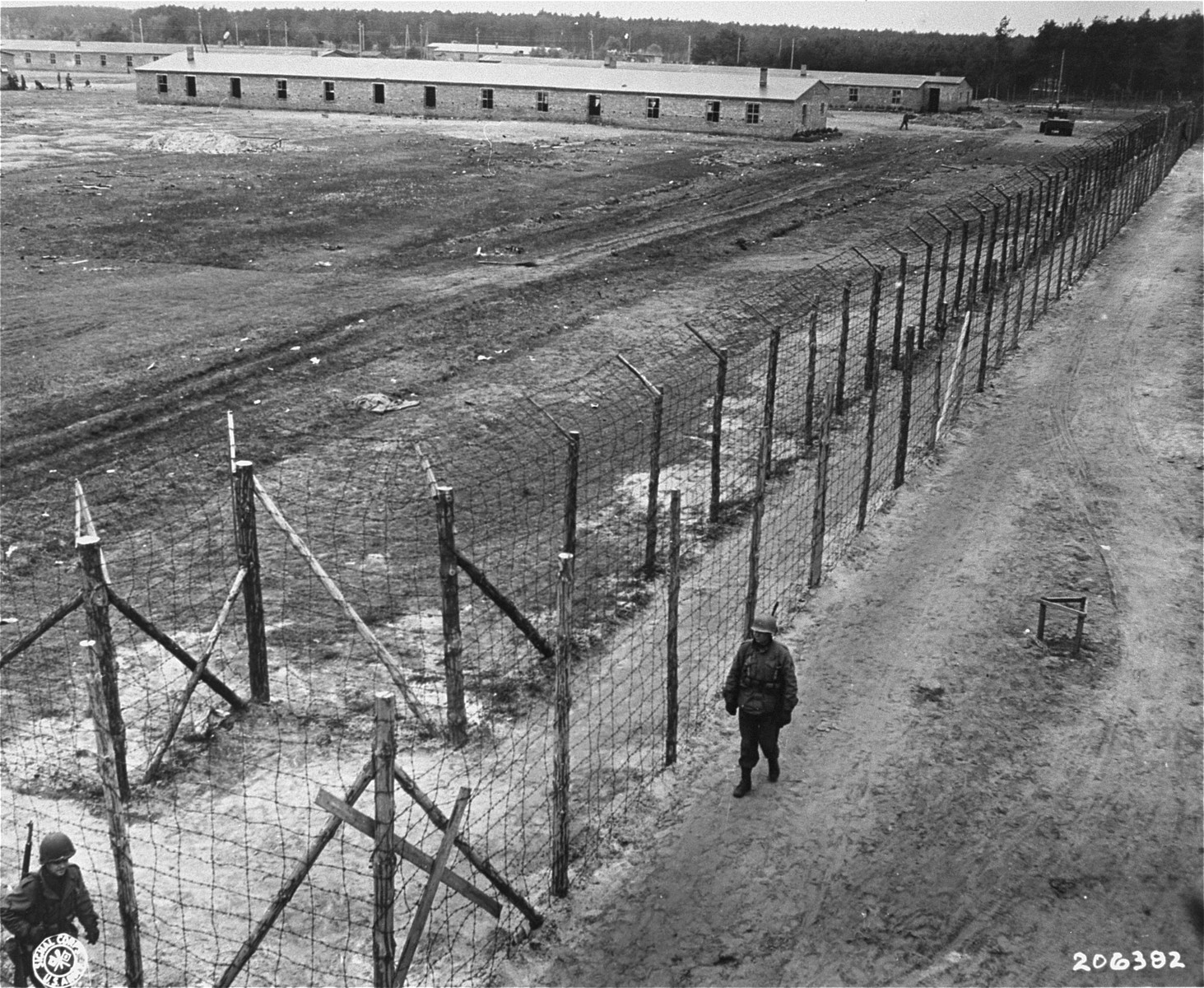
American soldiers patrol perimeter of the Woebbelin concentration camp.

Paul-Werner Hoppe (28 February 1910 – 15 July 1974) was an SS-Obersturmbannführer (lieutenant colonel) and was the commandant of Stutthof concentration camp from September 1942 until April 1945.

Hoppe joined the Nazi Party with membership number 1,596,491. He joined the SS in 1933 (membership number: 116,695). In 1936, he married Charlotte Baranowski, the daughter of Hermann Baranowski, a concentration camp commandant.

Hoppe was assigned to the Concentration Camps Inspectorate (Inspektion der Konzentrationslager) under SS-Obergruppenführer Theodor Eicke. He was instrumental in helping Eicke form the Totenkopf Division of the SS in the fall of 1939 and served as Eicke's adjutant. In April 1941, he was given command of an infantry company. In the spring of 1942, he received a serious leg wound in fighting the Red Army near Lake Ilmen in the Demyansk Pocket in Novgorod Oblast, U.S.S.R.

After convalescing, he was assigned to the SS-Totenkopfverbände and sent to Auschwitz as head of a guard detachment in July 1942. He was recommended for the position of camp commandant of Stutthof concentration camp near Danzig by SS-Gruppenführer Richard Glücks, Eicke's successor as Inspector of Concentration Camps. A promotion to SS-Sturmbannführer and Commandant of Stutthof were approved and he arrived at Stutthof in September 1942 to take up his new position.

As the Soviets advanced westward, it was decided by Albert Forster, Gauleiter of Danzig and the SS Higher and Police Leader Fritz Katzmann of military district XX, headquartered in Danzig to evacuate Stutthof. The formal evacuation order "Einsatzbefehl No 3" was signed by Hoppe on 25 January 1945 at 0500. The evacuation began an hour later under the command of SS-Hauptsturmführer Teodor Meyer. The destination of the “death march” was a sub-camp of Stutthof near Lauenburg in Pomerania about 87 miles (140 km) west-southwest of Stutthof.

After the mass evacuation, Hoppe became commandant of Wöbbelin concentration camp, a temporary camp set up to take prisoners evacuated from camps about to be overrun by the Red Army. Wöbbelin was only in existence from 12 February 1945 to 2 May 1945 when it was liberated by the American army.

Hoppe was captured by the British in April 1946 in Holstein. He was sent to Camp 165 at Watten in Scotland in August 1947 until January 1948 when he was transferred to an internment camp in Fallingbostel which was in the British zone of occupation in West Germany.

While awaiting extradition to Poland, Hoppe escaped and made his way to Switzerland where he worked as a landscape gardener under a false identity for three years before returning to West Germany. He was arrested by the West German authorities on 17 April 1953 in Witten, West Germany. He was tried and convicted as an accessory to murder on 16 December 1955. Initially sentenced to five years and three months imprisonment, on 4 June 1957, the district court in Bochum increased Hoppe's sentence to nine years and he was released from prison in late 1960. Hoppe died in 1974.

In 2021, Hoppe's former Stutthof secretary, Irmgard Furchner, was charged with 11,412 counts of being an accessory to murder and 18 additional counts of being an accessory to attempted murder. Furchner, who was then 96 years of age, served five days in pre-trial detention. She was convicted in December 2022, and her conviction was upheld by the German Federal Court of Justice in August 2024. Furchner died in January 2025.
