= Gerda Steinhoff =

Nazi concentration camp guard (1922–1946)

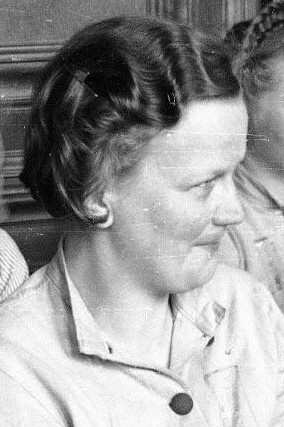
- Steinhoff at the Stutthof trial, held from 25 April to 31 May 1946 in Gdańsk
- Born: 29 January 1922; Danzig-Langfuhr, Free City of Danzig
- Died: 4 July 1946 (aged 24); Biskupia Górka, Gdańsk, Republic of Poland
- Cause of death: Execution by hanging
- Occupation: Stutthof concentration camp guard
- Organization: Schutzstaffel (SS)
- Conviction: Crimes against humanity
- Trial: Stutthof trials
- Penalty: Death

Gerda Steinhoff (29 January 1922 – 4 July 1946) was a Schutzstaffel (SS) Nazi concentration camp overseer following the 1939 German invasion of Poland.

== SS career ==
Steinhoff was born in Danzig-Langfuhr. As a teenager, she worked as house maid on a farm at Tygenhagen near Danzig. From 1939, she worked in a bakery in Danzig and later became a tramway conductor. She married in 1944 and had a child. In the same year, because of the Nazi call for new guards, she joined the camp staff at Stutthof.

On 1 October 1944, Steinhoff became a Blockleiterin, or block leader, in the Stutthof SK-III women's camp. There, she took part in selections of prisoners to be sent to the gas chambers. On 31 October, she was promoted to SS-Oberaufseherin, senior overseer, and assigned to the Danzig-Holm subcamp.

On 1 December 1944, Steinhoff was reassigned to the Stutthof Bromberg-Ost female subcamp located in Bydgoszcz, some 170 km (105 miles) south of Danzig. There, on 25 January 1945, she received a medal for her loyalty and service to the Third Reich. Steinhoff was devoted to her job in the camps and was known as a ruthless overseer. Just before the end of World War II, she fled the camp and returned home.

== Arrest, trial and execution ==
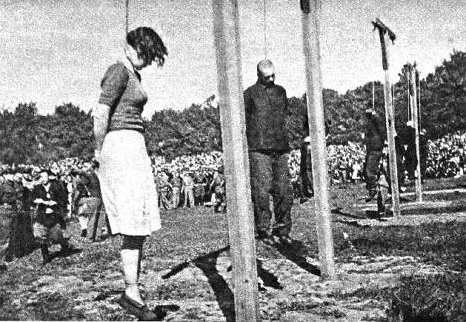
Stutthof personnel executions in Biskupia Górka, 4 July 1946. Steinhoff is on the left.

On 25 May 1945, Steinhoff was arrested and imprisoned by Polish officials. She was tried at the first Stutthof trial with other Schutzstaffel (SS) female staff and kapos. During her trial, Steinhoff repeatedly smiled and joked with her co-defendants. She was found guilty and convicted of crimes against humanity for her involvement in the selection process and her sadistic abuse of prisoners. Sentenced to death, Gerda Steinhoff was publicly hanged with the other ten condemned camp personnel on 4 July 1946 on Biskupia Górka Hill near Gdańsk.

== See also ==
- Female guards in Nazi concentration camps

== Sources ==
- Death on the Gallows
