= Capital punishment in Poland =

Europe holds the greatest concentration of abolitionist states (blue). Map current as of 2022 Abolished for all offences Abolished in practice Retains capital punishment

Capital punishment remained in Polish law until 1 September 1998, but from 1989 executions were suspended, the last one taking place one year earlier. No death penalty is envisaged in the current Polish penal law.

== History ==
According to its first Penal Code, of 1818, executions in the Kingdom of Poland would be carried out by beheading by the sword or, in exceptional cases, by hanging. The latter was allowed only for male prisoners convicted of heinous crimes. This Penal Code was in force until integration into Russia in 1867.

Since regaining independence in 1918, Polish law allowed the death penalty for murder and treason in time of peace, and a number of other offences during wartime. For example, during the Polish-Soviet War (later to become famous) writer Sergiusz Piasecki was sentenced to death for armed robbery in the war zone, although his sentence was later commuted.

From 1918 to 1928 firing squad was the only method of execution. Through a presidential decree in 1927, hanging became the main method of execution, with firing squad retained for soldiers or people who had committed crimes against state security. Stefan Maciejowski served as the first civil executioner and was a well-known public figure until his firing for alcoholism. Probably the most notable execution by firing squad during the time of the Second Polish Republic was the execution of Eligiusz Niewiadomski, a painter and far right-wing extremist, who assassinated President of Poland Gabriel Narutowicz in December 1922.

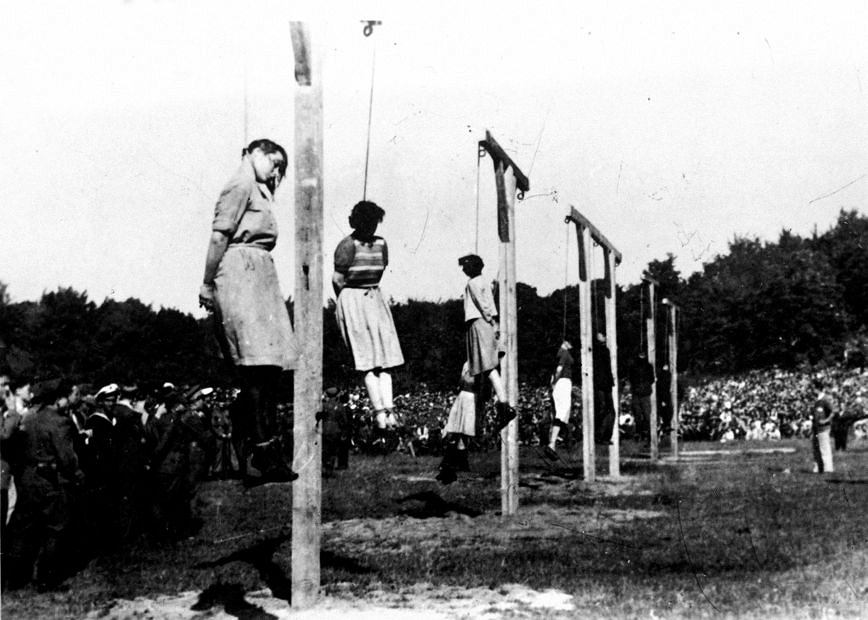
Execution of former Polish and German Nazi guards and soldiers on Biskupia Górka Hill near Gdańsk in 1946. The execution was short drop hanging.

For a number of years, criminal law in interwar Poland was considered less severe than in Western Europe; this was true for capital punishment as well. When in 1931 a criminal code was passed, the death penalty was incorporated into it by a majority of only a single vote. However, attitudes changed and in 1932 even 17-year-old convicts were allowed to receive the death sentence.

For a brief period during the Second Republic in the 1930s special military courts were introduced in present-day Ukraine. A number of people were hanged based upon decisions by these tribunals for crimes against state security.

Until 1950, the Minister of Interior could order a public execution. There were never such ones in the Second Polish Republic, but after World War II some notable Nazi war criminals were hanged in public. Former Auschwitz concentration camp commandant Rudolf Höss was executed before a large crowd of witnesses in the former camp area. Also former President of the Senate of the Free City of Danzig and gauleiter of Reichsgau Wartheland, SS officer Arthur Greiser was hanged in public in Poznań on 14 July 1946. This was the last public execution in Poland.

During the Stalinist era (1945–1956), the death penalty was a common instrument of political repression. The archetypal method was shooting a single bullet up into the base of the skull from behind; among people executed that way was Witold Pilecki, a hero of Auschwitz. The exact number of people executed until 1956 is unknown, but some sources estimated these numbers as about 3500.

After 1956 (events of Polish October) executions of political prisoners ended, and most executions were related to the crime of murder. The only exception was the case of Stanisław Wawrzecki, who was sentenced to death and hanged for economic crimes under pressure from communist leader Władysław Gomułka. The method authorized for soldiers and people who committed crimes against state security remained the firing squad.

The most recent confirmed execution of a female took place on 21 September 1949. Halina Żurowska, a former Home Army soldier, was executed by a single shot to the back of the head for espionage (almost certainly politically motivated charge) at Rakowiecka Prison in Warsaw. The last execution for an ordinary crime took place on 7 April 1922, when Józefina Paśnik was executed, along with her husband, by firing squad at the Citadel of Warsaw for murder.

The criminal code of 1969 only allowed for sentences of up to 25 years in prison or the death penalty; the Parliament of Poland disallowed life sentences on "humanitarian grounds".

From 1969 to 1995 344 people were sentenced to death and 183 were executed (all of sentenced and executed were males). In contrast to other states of the Soviet Bloc, the number of executions in Poland was relatively low.

The last execution took place on 21 April 1988 in Kraków, when murderer and rapist Andrzej Czabański was hanged.

After the collapse of communism in 1989 only a few death sentences were imposed:

- 1989 – Mariusz Trynkiewicz, sentenced for four counts of murder
- 1991 – Henryk Więckowski, sentenced for murder
- 1992 – Eugeniusz Mazur, sentenced for four counts of murder
- 1993 – Henryk Moruś, sentenced for seven counts of murder
- 1994 – Janusz Kulmatycki, sentenced for murder of a police officer
- 1994 – Grzegorz Płociniak, sentenced for double murder
- 1995 – Jan Franke, sentenced for double murder
- 1995 – Tomasz Ciepielewski, sentenced for murder
- 1995 – Zenon Gliwa, sentenced for double murder
- 1996 – Zbigniew Brzoskowski, sentenced for double murder, the last death sentence in Poland.

None of these death sentences were carried out. A moratorium on the death penalty was put into place in 1995, and the penal code of 1997 abolished the death penalty for all crimes; the code passed into Polish law on 1 September 1998. Existing death sentences were converted to life imprisonment.

Protocol 6 of the European Convention on Human Rights, which Poland has ratified, restricts the application of the death penalty to times of war or "imminent threat of war". In 2014, Poland ratified Protocol 13 of the Convention, which provides for the total abolition of the death penalty. Poland has also ratified the Second Optional Protocol to the International Covenant on Civil and Political Rights on 25 April 2014.

== Politics ==
Today, most political circles are opposed to the idea of reintroducing the death penalty, although it has had support from some members of the former (2005–2007) right-wing government, namely former President Lech Kaczyński. He had expressed his desire to reinstate the death penalty, clashing with the European Union over the issue. The national-conservative League of Polish Families (LPR) and the agrarian Self-Defence of the Republic of Poland (SRP) also showed some support for the death penalty for a short period of time. Some politicians of the centre-right Civic Platform (PO) stated that they would support death penalty if it was legal in the EU.

A 2004 poll found that 77% supported the death penalty, up from 74% in 2003.

In 2007, justice minister Andrzej Duda that the EU "should approach the subject in a broader way and debate the protection of life"; Poland was the only EU member state to object to that year's European Day Against the Death Penalty.

To support the move, Kaczyński has stated that the death penalty remains popular with most Poles and that abolishing the death penalty gives criminals advantages over victims. A poll by CBOS, a publicly funded Polish research institute, showed that 63% favored reinstating the death penalty. Both Pope Francis, as well as former Presidents Lech Wałęsa and Aleksander Kwaśniewski had expressed their opposition to such a measure. Another poll, in 2007 by Angus Reid Global Monitor, showed that Poles were divided on the issue. 52 per cent of respondents said they opposed the death penalty while 46 per cent said they supported it, with a margin of error at 4.5 per cent.

A 2011 study found that support for the death penalty was strongest in Częstochowa and Gorzów Wielkopolski, and was highest in Poles expressing xenophobic attitudes, followed by positive attitudes towards communism, while being lowest in religious people and those expressing trust in governmental institutions.

Currently, the only party in the Sejm that supports bringing back the death penalty is the Confederation.

A 2019 poll found that 45% supported the death penalty. A third of respondents opposed it.

In 2023, Polish PM Mateusz Morawiecki said he supported the death penalty. Morawiecki said that the removal of the death penalty was a "premature invention", and "the death penalty should be admissible for the heaviest crimes". He acknowledged that he disagreed with the Catholic Church on the issue. Later that year, Morawiecki, along with minister of justice Zbigniew Ziobro, supported the death penalty during a press conference dedicated to the murder of an eight-year-old boy, Kamil from Częstochowa, by his stepfather. Senator and lawyer Gabriela Morawska-Stanecka criticised Morawiecki and Ziobro's statements as "political chutzpah", and said that the death penalty does not deter crime and cited the case of Tomasz Komenda, (Note: Tomasz Komenda was falsely convicted of the 1997 murder of a 15-year-old girl, and spent 18 years in prison. He was released in March 2018 and acquitted by the Supreme Court of Poland two months later.) who in her opinion, would have been executed if Poland still had the death penalty. Theologist and philosopher Sebastian Duda said that Morawiecki, along with others that hold similar views to him, are either heterodoxes or hypocrites, since they publicly call themselves Catholics but do not agree with Catholic doctrine, which is against the death penalty.

A 2023, poll found that 48.3% supported the death penalty, 46.3% opposed and 5.4 no answer. It also found that 76% of United Right voters supported it, while 65% of the opposition opposed it. 32% of the opposition supported it.

In 2025, president Andrzej Duda supported implementing the death penalty by hanging for treason. This was criticised by foreign minister Radosław Sikorski, who said that such a measure would be against Protocol No. 6 to the European Convention on Human Rights, which Poland is a signatory to. Sikorski said that Poland had no plans to withdraw from the agreement.

== Execution procedure ==
During the years in which the death penalty existed in Poland, execution by hanging was carried out in eight prisons in the country. Typically, executions would take place around 6.00 p.m., when there were the most prison guards present.

The prisoner was unaware of the fact that the execution was imminent: he was not informed of the date and time when it would take place. Prisoners were only informed at the last moment, as they entered the death chamber. Death chambers were usually located alongside toilets and reportedly many of the condemned may have thought they were taken to wash themselves. A final meeting with their family (or the presence at the execution of a family representative) was not allowed. Families of condemned prisoners were not told in advance of the execution date. They only learned of the execution after it had taken place and their relative was dead.

Any person sentenced to death could write a plea for pardon and submit it to the President or, in the Polish People's Republic, to the Council of State. Even if they did not do that, case files after exhausting all of the possible remedies had to be immediately submitted to the head of state with an attached proposal stating whether the convicted deserved to be pardoned, drawn up by the Public Prosecutor General.

Except for the prison guards, medical team and executioner, the only persons present during the execution were the prosecutor (not the judges) and, if the prisoner wished, a priest and his lawyer.

After having his hands tied the prisoner was escorted to the death chamber. The execution chamber had two rooms – one for final preparations and the second containing the gallows. Then prosecutor read the verdict and informed the condemned prisoner that the President / Council of State did not use the right to pardon and therefore the penalty would be executed.

The prisoner had a right to a last wish – e.g. cigarette, simple last meal or writing a letter to their family.

There were two professional executioners in Poland (both of them members of the prison guard) who received a fee for performing an execution. Their names were kept secret to protect them from reprisals. Both were guards in Warsaw and, if the execution was to be carried out in another place, they travelled to the relevant prison before the execution.

Executions using firing squads were carried out in the military camp in Rembertów. From 1970 to 1988 three soldiers were shot for the crime of murder and rape.

Number of executions in Poland
1960	1961	1962	1963	1964	1965	1966	1967	1968	1969	1970	1971	1972	1973	1974
16	5	6	4	10	5	6	7	8	7	10	9	6	27	7
1975	1976	1977	1978	1979	1980	1981	1982	1983	1984	1985	1986	1987	1988	
10	16	13	12	12	4	6	2	8	9	10	10	6	1	

== See also ==
- A Short Film About Killing and its original version, Dekalog: Five
