= Brovst Municipality =

Brovst Municipality Brovst Kommune
- Former municipality
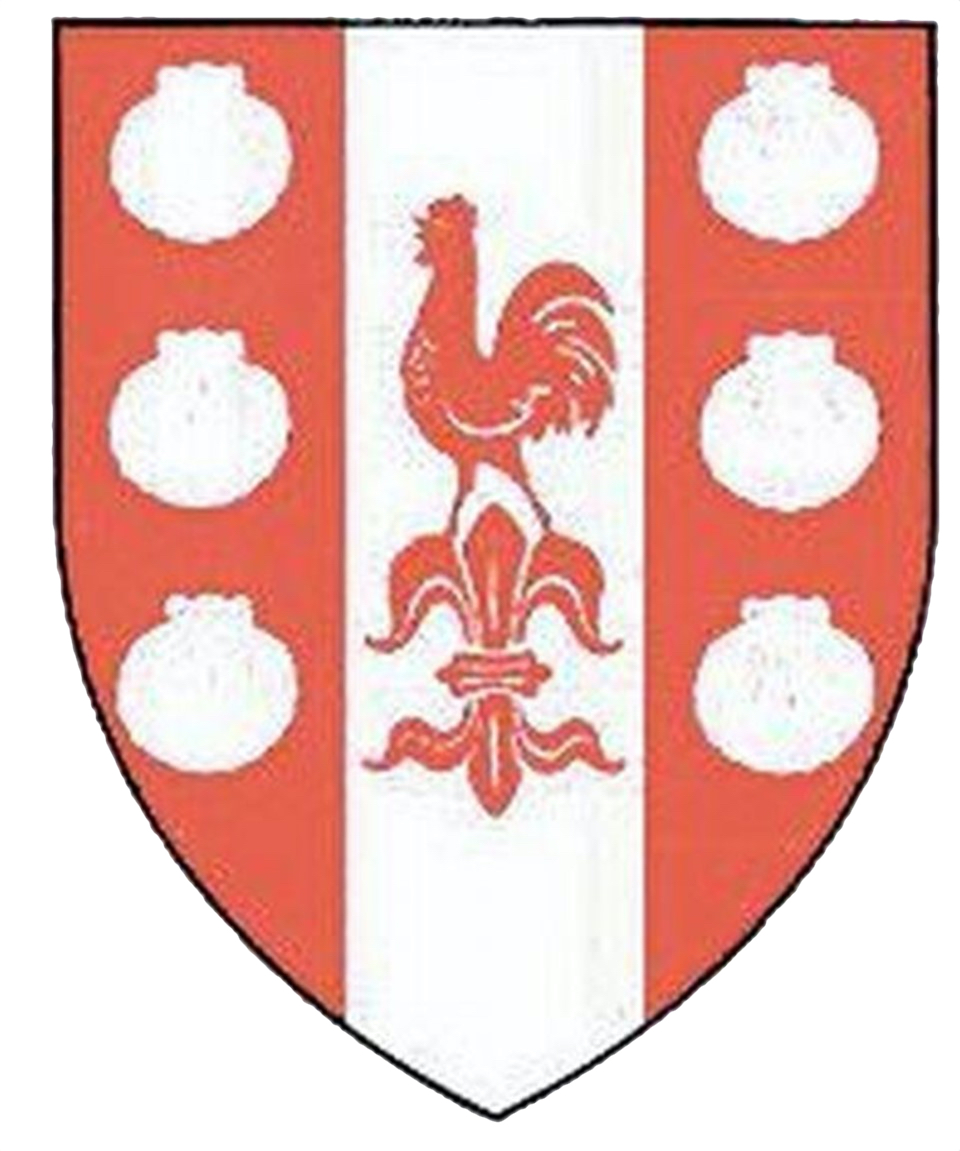
- Coat of arms

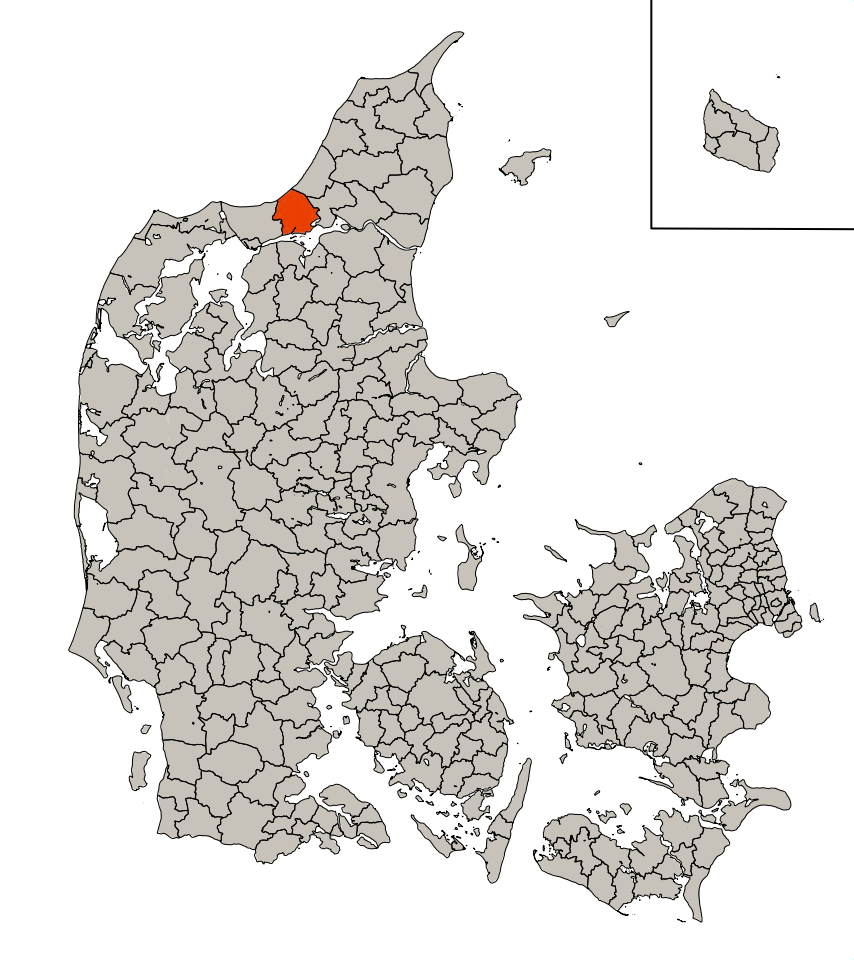
- Coordinates: 57°5′44″N 9°31′10″E
- Country: Denmark
- County: North Jutland
- Established: 1 April 1970
- Dissolved: 31 December 2006
- Seat: Brovst

Government
  - Last mayor: Mogens Christian Gade (V)

Area
  - Total: 222.72 km^{2} (85.99 sq mi)

Population (2006)
  - Total: 8,281
  - Density: 37.18/km^{2} (96.30/sq mi)
- Time zone: UTC1 (CET)
  - Summer (DST): UTC2 (CEST)
- Municipal code: 803

Until 1 January 2007 Brovst Municipality was a municipality (Danish: kommune) in the former North Jutland County, on the North Jutlandic Island, bordering the Limfjord to the south and the North Sea to the north. The municipality covered an area of 222.72 km^{2}, and had a total population of 8,281 (2006). Its last mayor was Mogens Christian Gade, a member of the Venstre political party.

Brovst Municipality bordered Fjerritslev Municipality to the west, Pandrup Municipality to the north and Aabybro Municipality to the east.

The municipality ceased to exist as the result of Kommunalreformen 2007 (the Municipality Reform of 2007). It was merged with the Fjerritslev, Aabybro and Pandrup municipalities to form the new Jammerbugt municipality. The new municipality belongs to the North Jutland Region.

== History ==
In the Middle Ages, Denmark was divided into syssels. The area that made up Brovst Municipality was part of the hundred Han Hundred (Danish: Han Herred) and belonged to the syssel of Thysyssel. It later came under the fief of Aalborghus. In 1662 Han Hundred was merged with a number of hundreds and came under Åstrup, Sejlstrup, Børglum County. The county lasted until 1793. The area that made up Brovst Municipality was under the hundred of Øster Han Hundred, which came under Thisted County in 1793. This county lasted until the 1970 Danish Municipal Reform where it came under the North Jutland County.

In 1842 Denmark was divided into smaller administrative divisions, namely parish municipalities (Danish: sognekommunner). The borders of these municipalities were largely based on the country's parishes. In the 1970 municipal reform these parish municipalities were dissolved. In 1966 five parish municipalities had been merged to form Brovst Parish Municipality, which was reformed to Brovst Municipality in the 1970 municipal reform. This municipality lasted until 2007 when it was merged with the municipalities of Pandrup, Aabybro and Fjerritslev to form Jammerbugt Municipality.

=== Historical divisions ===
Historical municipal divisions of Pandrup Municipality
2007	1970	1966	1842	Towns
Jammerbugt Mun.	Brovst Mun.	Brovst Parish Mun.	Brovst Parish Mun.	Brovst
Jammerbugt Mun.	Brovst Mun.	Brovst Parish Mun.	Brovst Parish Mun.	Halvrimmen
Jammerbugt Mun.	Brovst Mun.	Brovst Parish Mun.	Brovst Parish Mun.	Arentsminde
Jammerbugt Mun.	Brovst Mun.	Brovst Parish Mun.	Øland Parish Mun.	Østerby
Jammerbugt Mun.	Brovst Mun.	Brovst Parish Mun.	Torslev Parish Mun.	Skovsgård
Jammerbugt Mun.	Brovst Mun.	Brovst Parish Mun.	Øster Svenstrup Parish Mun.	Ny Skovsgård
Jammerbugt Mun.	Brovst Mun.	Brovst Parish Mun.	Lerup-Tranum Parish Mun.	Tranum
Jammerbugt Mun.	Aabybro Mun.			
Jammerbugt Mun.	Pandrup Mun.			
Jammerbugt Mun.	Fjerritslev Mun.			

== Towns ==
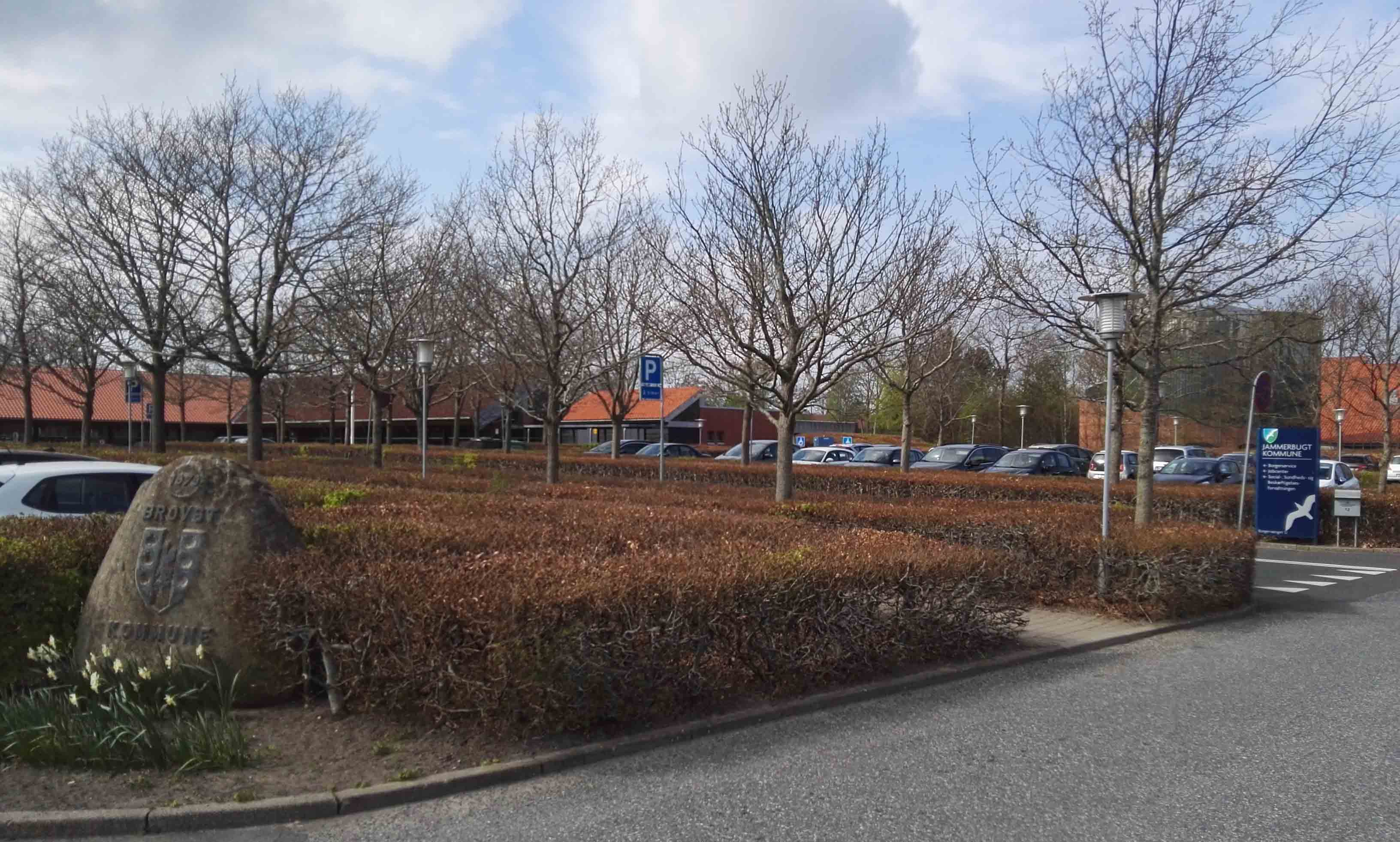
Former city hall in Brovst.

Approximately a third of the population lived in the municipality's seat of Brovst, with another third living in the remaining larger towns and villages of the municipality. The last third lived in rural areas or small villages. Smaller villages in the municipality include Ny Skovsgård.

Brovst was located centrally in the municipality.

Below are the populations from 2006 of the six larger settlements of the municipality.

Brovst	2,749
Skovsgård	864
Halvrimmen	670
Arentsminde	473
Tranum	443
Østerby	375

== Politics ==
=== Municipal council ===
Below are the municipal council elected since the municipality's creation in 1970 and until 2001, which was the last election before the municipality was dissolved.

Election	Party									Total seats	Elected mayor
Election	A	B	C	F	K	O	V	Z	...	Total seats	Elected mayor
1970	4								13	17	Carl Nielsen (...)
1974	3				1		4		9	17	Carl Nielsen (...)
1978	4				1		3	2	7	17	Carl Nielsen (...)
1981	4		1		1		3	2	6	17	Carl Nielsen (...)
1985	3		1	1	1		3	2	6	17	Henning Mysander (V)
1989	5	1	1				4	2	4	17	Henning Mysander (V)
1993	5	1					5	3	3	17	Henning Mysander (V)
1997	5	1					4		7	17	Ole Christensen (A)
2001	7					1	6		3	17	Mogens Christian Gade (V)
Data from Statistikbanken.dk and editions of Kommunal Aarbog

=== Mayors ===
Since the creation of the municipality in 1970 and until it was dissolved in 2007, the mayors of Brovst Municipality were:

#	Mayor	Party	Term
1	Carl Nielsen	Local party	1970-1986
2	Henning Mysander	Venstre	1986-1998
3	Ole Christensen	Social Democrats	1998-2002
4	Mogens Christian Gade	Venstre	2002-2007

== Parishes ==
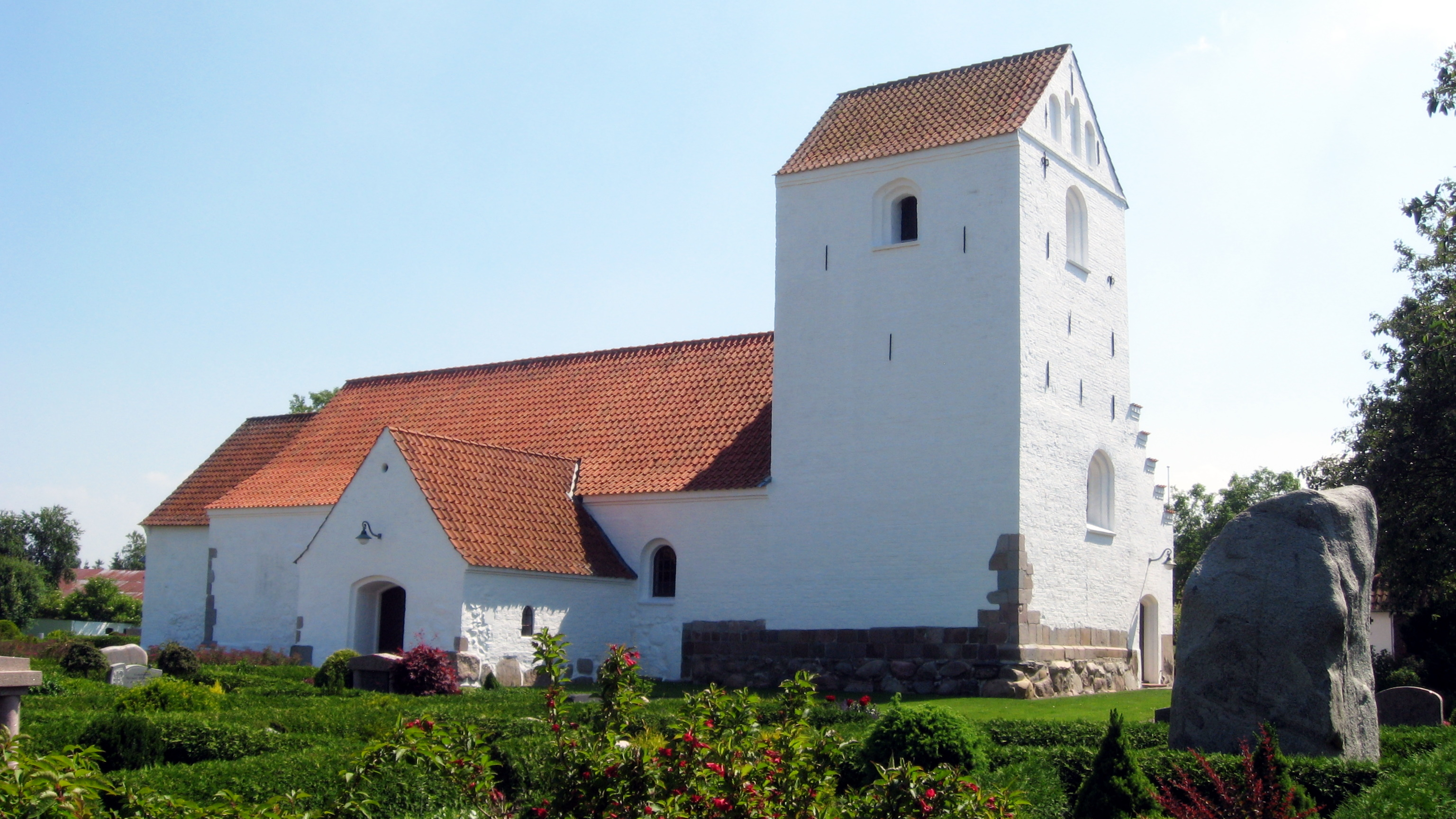
Brovst Church

The municipality consisted of seven parishes and seven churches.

- Brovst Parish (Brovst Church)
- Langeslund Parish (Langeslund Church)
- Lerup Parish (Lerup Church)
- Torslev Parish (Torslev Church)
- Tranum Parish (Tranum Church)
- Øland Parish (Oxholm Church)
- Øster Svenstrup Parish (Øster Svenstrup Church)

== Symbols ==
Brovst Municipality's coat of arms was a red rooster on white background. On either side of the rooster was three white seashells on red background.
