= Pandrup Municipality =

Pandrup Municipality Pandrup Kommune
- Former municipality
- Coat of arms

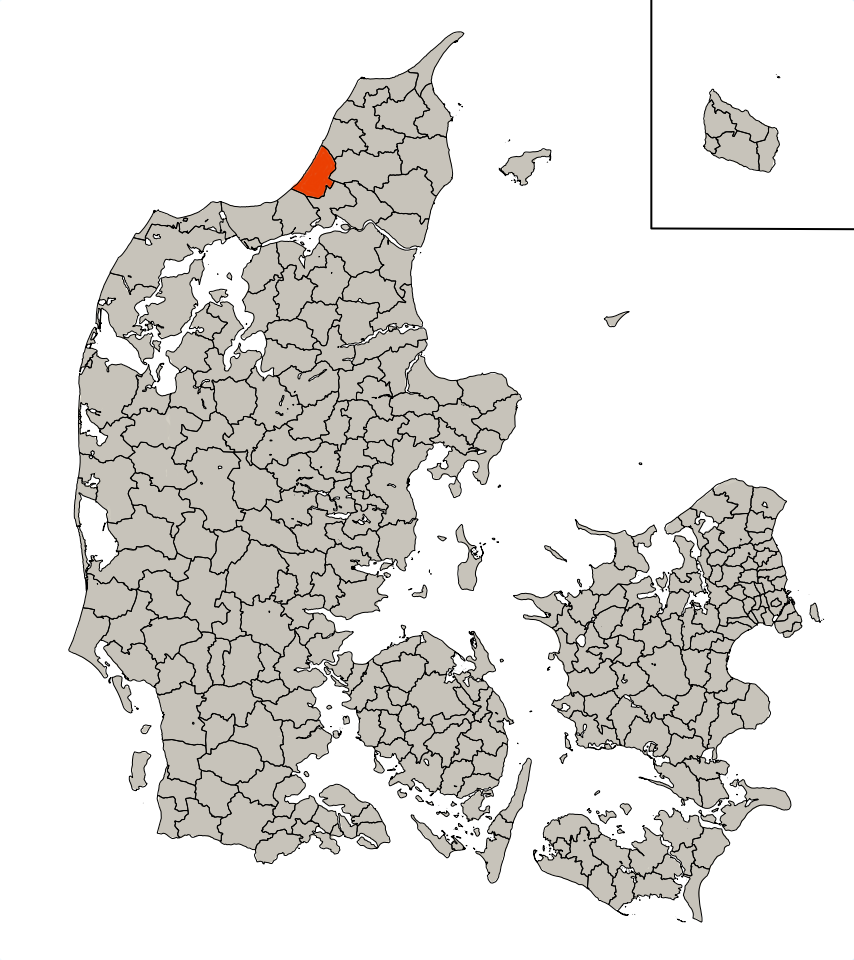
- Country: Denmark
- County: North Jutland
- Established: April 1, 1970
- Dissolved: December 31, 2006
- Seat: Pandrup

Government
  - Last mayor: Flemming Jansen (V)

Area
  - Total: 189.67 km^{2} (73.23 sq mi)

Population (2006)
  - Total: 10,612
  - Density: 55.950/km^{2} (144.91/sq mi)
- Time zone: UTC1 (CET)
  - Summer (DST): UTC2 (CEST)
- Municipal code: 835

Until January 1, 2007 Pandrup Municipality was a municipality (Danish: kommune) in the former North Jutland County, on the north coast of the North Jutlandic Island. The municipality covered an area of 189.67 km^{2}, and had a total population of 10,612 (2006). Its last mayor was Flemming Jansen, a member of the Venstre political party.

Pandrup Municipality bordered Løkken-Vrå Municipality to the north, Brønderslev Municipality to the east, Aabybro Municipality to the south-east and Brovst Municipality to the south-west.

The municipality ceased to exist as the result of Kommunalreformen 2007 (the Municipality Reform of 2007). It was merged with the Fjerritslev, Aabybro and Brovst municipalities to form the new Jammerbugt municipality. The new municipality belongs to the North Jutland Region.

== History ==
In the Middle Ages, Denmark was divided into syssels. The area that made up Pandrup Municipality was part of the hundred Han Hundred (Danish: Han Herred) and belonged to the syssel of Thysyssel. It later came under the fief of Aalborghus. In 1662 Han Hundred was merged with a number of hundreds and came under Åstrup, Sejlstrup, Børglum County. The county lasted until 1793. The area that made up Pandrup Municipality was under the hundred of Hvetbo Hundred, which came under Thisted County in 1793. This county lasted until the 1970 Danish Municipal Reform where it came under the North Jutland County.

In 1842 Denmark was divided into smaller administrative divisions, namely parish municipalities (Danish: sognekommunner). The borders of these municipalities were largely based on the country's parishes. In the 1970 municipal reform these parish municipalities were dissolved. Three parish municipalities were merged to create Pandrup Municipality. This municipality lasted until 2007 when it was merged with the municipalities of Brovst, Aabybro and Fjerritslev to form Jammerbugt Municipality.

=== Historical divisions ===
Historical municipal divisions of Pandrup Municipality
2007	1970	1842	Towns
Jammerbugt Mun.	Pandrup Mun.	Jetsmark Parish Mun.	Pandrup
Jammerbugt Mun.	Pandrup Mun.	Jetsmark Parish Mun.	Kås
Jammerbugt Mun.	Pandrup Mun.	Saltum-Hune Parish Mun.	Saltum
Jammerbugt Mun.	Pandrup Mun.	Saltum-Hune Parish Mun.	Hune
Jammerbugt Mun.	Pandrup Mun.	Saltum-Hune Parish Mun.	Blokhus
Jammerbugt Mun.	Pandrup Mun.	Ingstrup-Vester Hjermitslev-Alstrup Parish Mun.	Ingstrup
Jammerbugt Mun.	Pandrup Mun.	Ingstrup-Vester Hjermitslev-Alstrup Parish Mun.	Vester Hjermitslev
Jammerbugt Mun.	Aabybro Mun.		
Jammerbugt Mun.	Brovst Mun.		
Jammerbugt Mun.	Fjerritslev Mun.		

== Towns ==
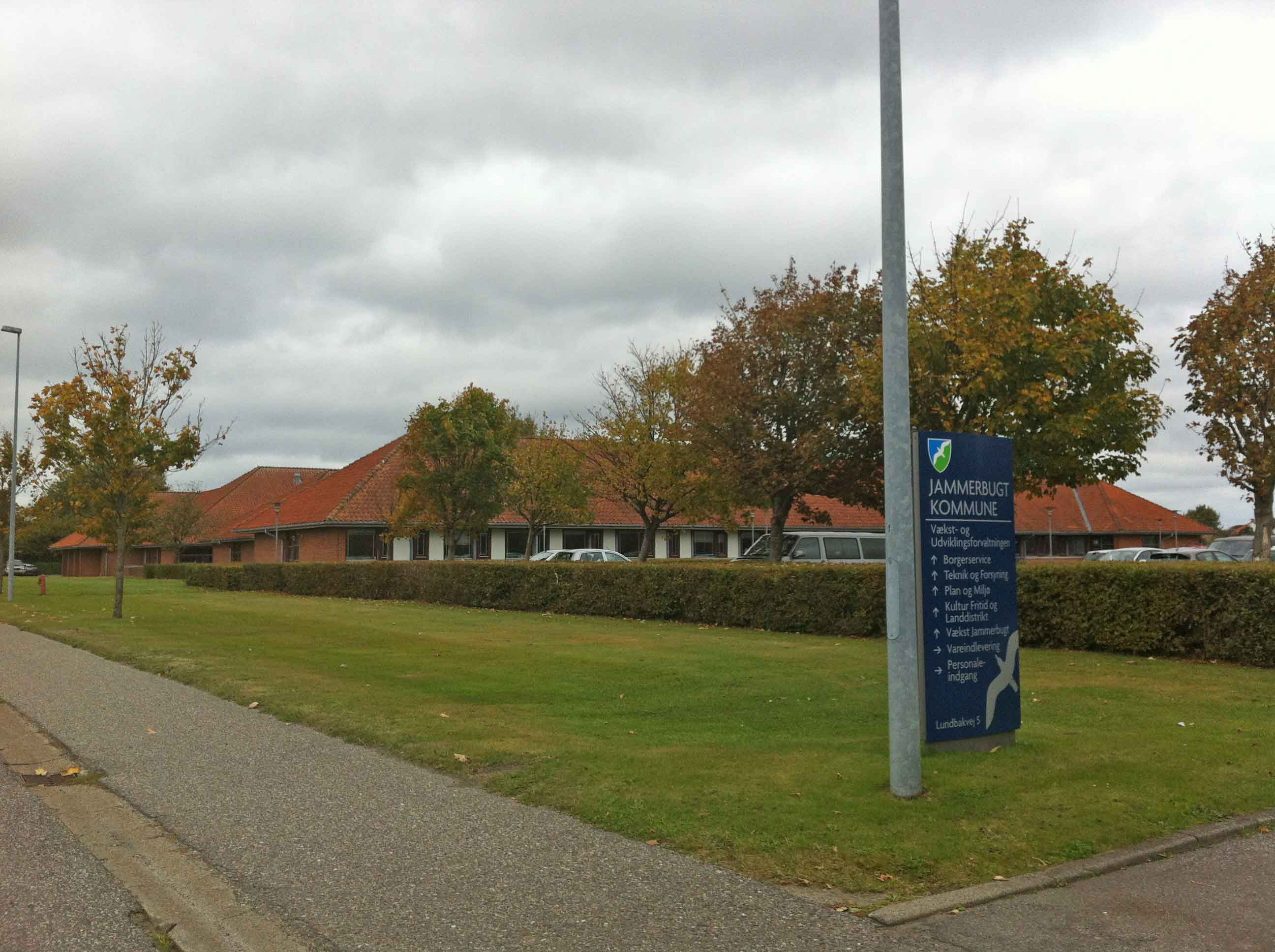
Former city hall in Pandrup.

Approximately a quarter of the municipality's population lived in the municipality's seat of Pandrup. Another quarter lived in rural areas or small villages. A fifth lived in Kås, while the remaining population lived in the larger towns and villages of the municipality.

Pandrup was located in the southern part of the municipality, as was the towns of Hune, Blokhus, Kås and Moseby. Moseby has today grown together with Kås. Saltum, Ingstrup and Vester Hjermitslev were located in the northern part of the municipality.

Below are the populations from 2006 of the eight larger settlements of the municipality.

Pandrup	2,789
Kås	2,059
Saltum	724
Moseby	619
Hune	508
Vester Hjermitslev	446
Ingstrup	434
Blokhus	408

== Politics ==
=== Municipal council ===
Below are the municipal council elected since the municipality's creation in 1970 and until 2001, which was the last election before the municipality was dissolved.

Election	Party									Total seats	Elected mayor
Election	A	B	C	F	K	O	V	Z	...	Total seats	Elected mayor
1970	5						1		11	17	Niels Simoni Nielsen (V)
1974	4						1		12	17	Niels Simoni Nielsen (V)
1978	5		1		1		4	1	5	17	Niels Simoni Nielsen (V)
1981	6		2				5	2	2	17	Lars Dam Jens (V)
1985	7		4				5	1		17	Lars Dam Jens (V)
1989	6		2	1	1		5	1	1	17	Lars Dam Jens (V)
1993	7		1	1	1		6		1	17	Søren P. Mortensen (A)
1997	7	1	1	1	1		6			17	Flemming Jansen (V)
2001	7					1	9			17	Flemming Jansen (V)
Data from Statistikbanken.dk and editions of Kommunal Aarbog

=== Mayors ===
Since the creation of the municipality in 1970 and until it was dissolved in 2007, the mayors of Pandrup Municipality were:

#	Mayor	Party	Term
1	Niels Simoni Nielsen	Venstre	1970-1982
2	Lars Dam Jens	Venstre	1982-1994
3	Søren P. Mortensen	Social Democrats	1994-1998
3	Flemming Jansen	Venstre	1998-2007

== Parishes ==
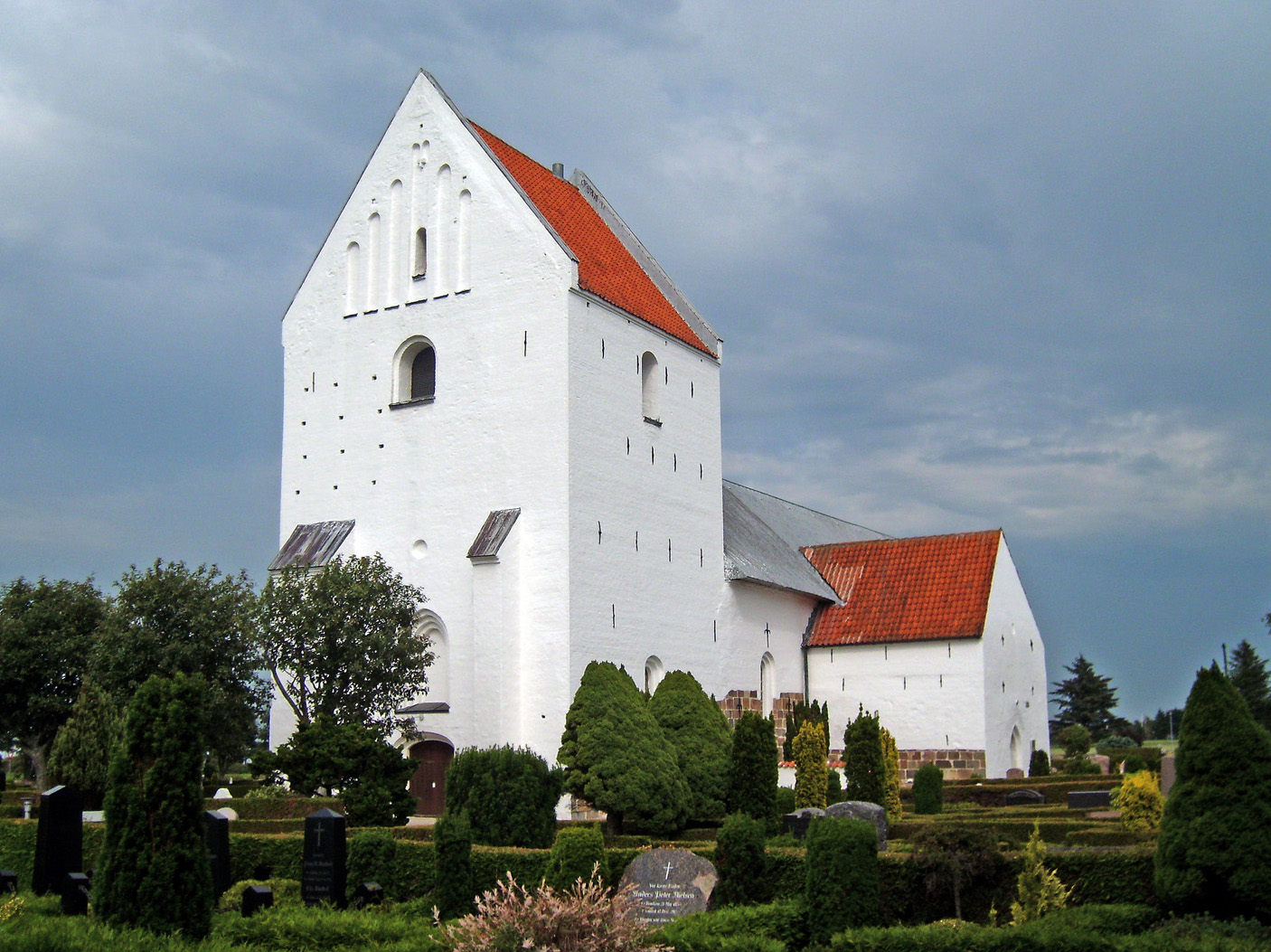
Saltum Church

The municipality consisted of six parishes and seven churches.

- Alstrup Parish (Alstrup Church)
- Hune Parish (Hune Church, Rødhus Church)
- Ingstrup Parish (Ingstrup Church)
- Jetsmark Parish (Jetsmark Church)
- Saltum Parish (Saltum Church)
- Vester Hjermitslev Parish (Vester Hjermitslev Church)

== Symbols ==
Pandrup Municipality's coat of arms was half a straw next to the sea, both shown in white. Above the sea was a red sun. The background was blue, with a frame in red and white.
