= Aabybro Municipality =

Coordinates: 57°9′N 9°45′E

Aabybro Municipality Aabybro Kommune
- Former municipality
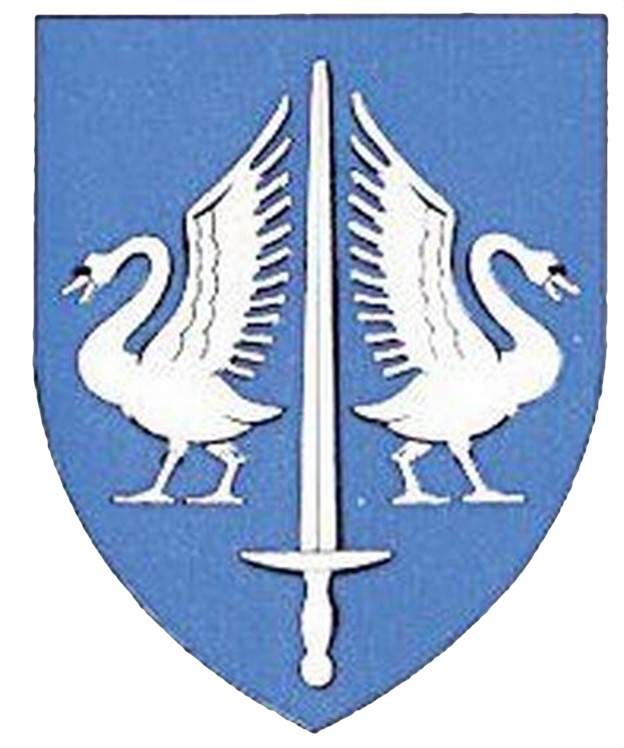
- Coat of arms

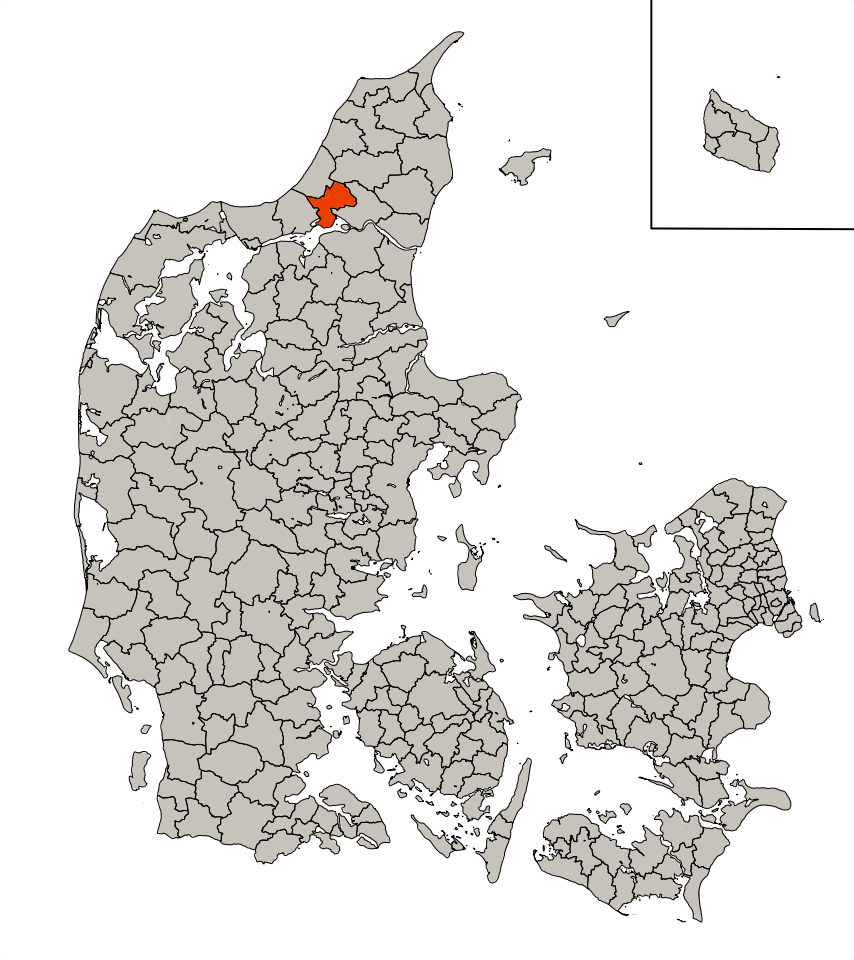
- Country: Denmark
- County: North Jutland
- Established: April 1, 1970
- Dissolved: December 31, 2006
- Seat: Aabybro

Government
  - Last mayor: Ole L. Andersen (V)

Area
  - Total: 170.88 km^{2} (65.98 sq mi)

Population (2006)
  - Total: 11,390
  - Density: 66.65/km^{2} (172.6/sq mi)
- Time zone: UTC1 (CET)
  - Summer (DST): UTC2 (CEST)
- Municipal code: 849

Until January 1, 2007 Aabybro Municipality was a municipality (Danish: kommune) in the former North Jutland County, on the south coast of the North Jutlandic Island, bordering the Limfjord. The municipality covered an area of 170.88 km^{2}, and had a total population of 11,390 (2006). Its last mayor was Ole Lykkegaard Andersen, a member of the Venstre political party.

Aabybro Municipality bordered Brovst Municipality to the west, Pandrup and Brønderslev Municipality to the north and Aalborg Municipality to the east and south.

The municipality ceased to exist as the result of Kommunalreformen 2007 (the Municipality Reform of 2007). It was merged with the Brovst, Pandrup and Fjerritslev municipalities to form the new Jammerbugt municipality. The new municipality belongs to the North Jutland Region.

== History ==
In the Middle Ages, Denmark was divided into syssels. The area that made up Aabybro Municipality was part of the hundred Han Hundred (Danish: Han Herred) and belonged to the syssel of Thysyssel. It later came under the fief of Aalborghus. In 1662 Han Hundred was merged with a number of hundreds and came under Åstrup, Sejlstrup, Børglum County. The county lasted until 1793. The area that made up Aabybro Municipality was under the hundreds of Øster Han Hundred and Hvetbo Hundred, both of which came under Thisted County in 1793. This county lasted until the 1970 Danish Municipal Reform where it came under the North Jutland County.

In 1842 Denmark was divided into smaller administrative divisions, namely parish municipalities (Danish: sognekommunner). The borders of these municipalities were largely based on the country's parishes. In the 1970 municipal reform these parish municipalities were dissolved. Three parish municipalities were merged to create Aabybro Municipality. This municipality lasted until 2007 when it was merged with the municipalities of Brovst, Pandrup and Fjerritslev to form Jammerbugt Municipality.

=== Historical divisions ===
Historical municipal divisions of Aabybro Municipality
2007	1970	1929	1842	Towns
Jammerbugt Mun.	Aabybro Mun.	Åby-Biersted Parish Mun.	Åby-Biersted Parish Mun.	Aabybro
Jammerbugt Mun.	Aabybro Mun.	Åby-Biersted Parish Mun.	Åby-Biersted Parish Mun.	Biersted
Jammerbugt Mun.	Aabybro Mun.	Åby-Biersted Parish Mun.	Åby-Biersted Parish Mun.	Nørhalne
Jammerbugt Mun.	Aabybro Mun.	Vedsted Parish Mun.	Åby-Biersted Parish Mun.	Birkelse
Jammerbugt Mun.	Aabybro Mun.	Gjøl Parish Mun.		Gjøl
Jammerbugt Mun.	Pandrup Mun.			
Jammerbugt Mun.	Brovst Mun.			
Jammerbugt Mun.	Fjerritslev Mun.			

== Towns ==
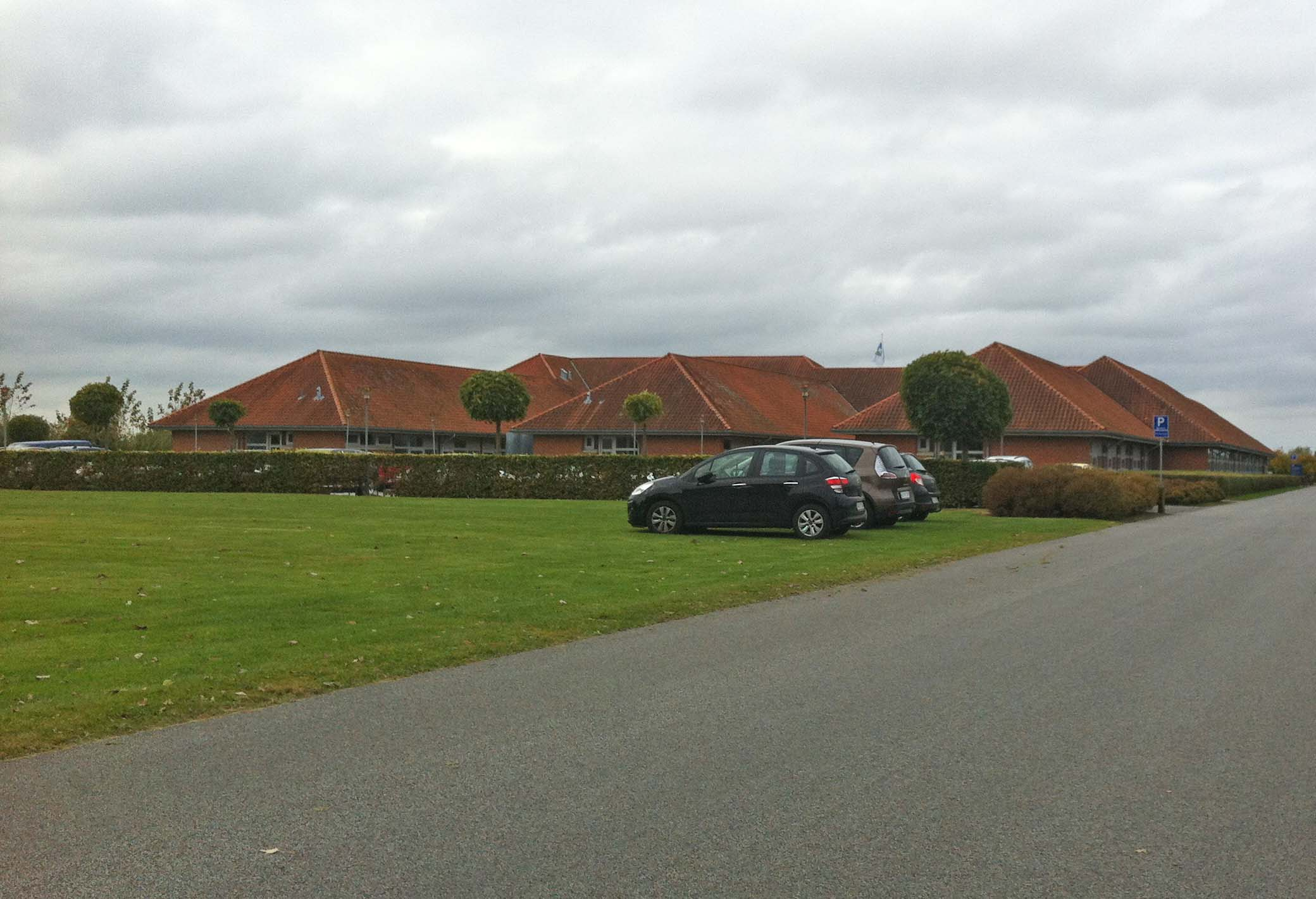
Aabybro city hall

Approximately 40% of the municipality's population lived in the town of Aabybro. Around a fifth lived in rural areas or small villages, with the remaining approximately 40% living in the municipality's larger towns and villages, these being Biersted, Birkelse, Gjøl and Nørhalne. Smaller villages in the municipality included Ryå and Fristrup.

Aabybro was the seat of the municipality. The town was located centrally, with the Birkelse to the west, Nørhalne and Biersted to the west and Gjøl to the south.

Below are the populations from 2006 of the five larger settlements of the municipality.

Aabybro	4,876
Biersted	1,698
Nørhalne	1,194
Gjøl	916
Birkelse	739

== Politics ==
=== Municipal council ===
Below are the municipal council elected since the municipality's creation in 1970 and until 2001, which was the last election before the municipality was dissolved.

Election	Party								Total seats	Elected mayor
Election	A	B	C	D	F	V	Z	...	Total seats	Elected mayor
1970	6	1	1			3		6	17	Jørgen H. Jørgensen (V)
1974	4	3	1	1		5	2	1	17	Jørgen H. Jørgensen (V)
1978	5	2	1	1		5	2	1	17	Aage Nielsen (V)
1981	6		2			6	1	2	17	Herdis Gregersen (V)
1985	7		2		1	6		1	17	Herdis Gregersen (V)
1989	6		1		1	8	1		17	Ole L. Andersen (V)
1993	5		1		1	8	1	1	17	Ole L. Andersen (V)
1997	5		1		2	7	1	1	17	Ole L. Andersen (V)
2001	5				2	9		1	17	Ole L. Andersen (V)
Data from Statistikbanken.dk and editions of Kommunal Aarbog

=== Mayors ===
Since the creation of the municipality in 1970 and until it was dissolved in 2007, the mayors of Aabybro Municipality were:

#	Mayor	Party	Term
1	Jørgen H. Jørgensen	Venstre	1970-1978
2	Aage Nielsen	Venstre	1978-1982
3	Herdis Gregersen	Venstre	1982-1987
4	Ole Lykkegaard Andersen	Venstre	1986-2007

== Parishes ==
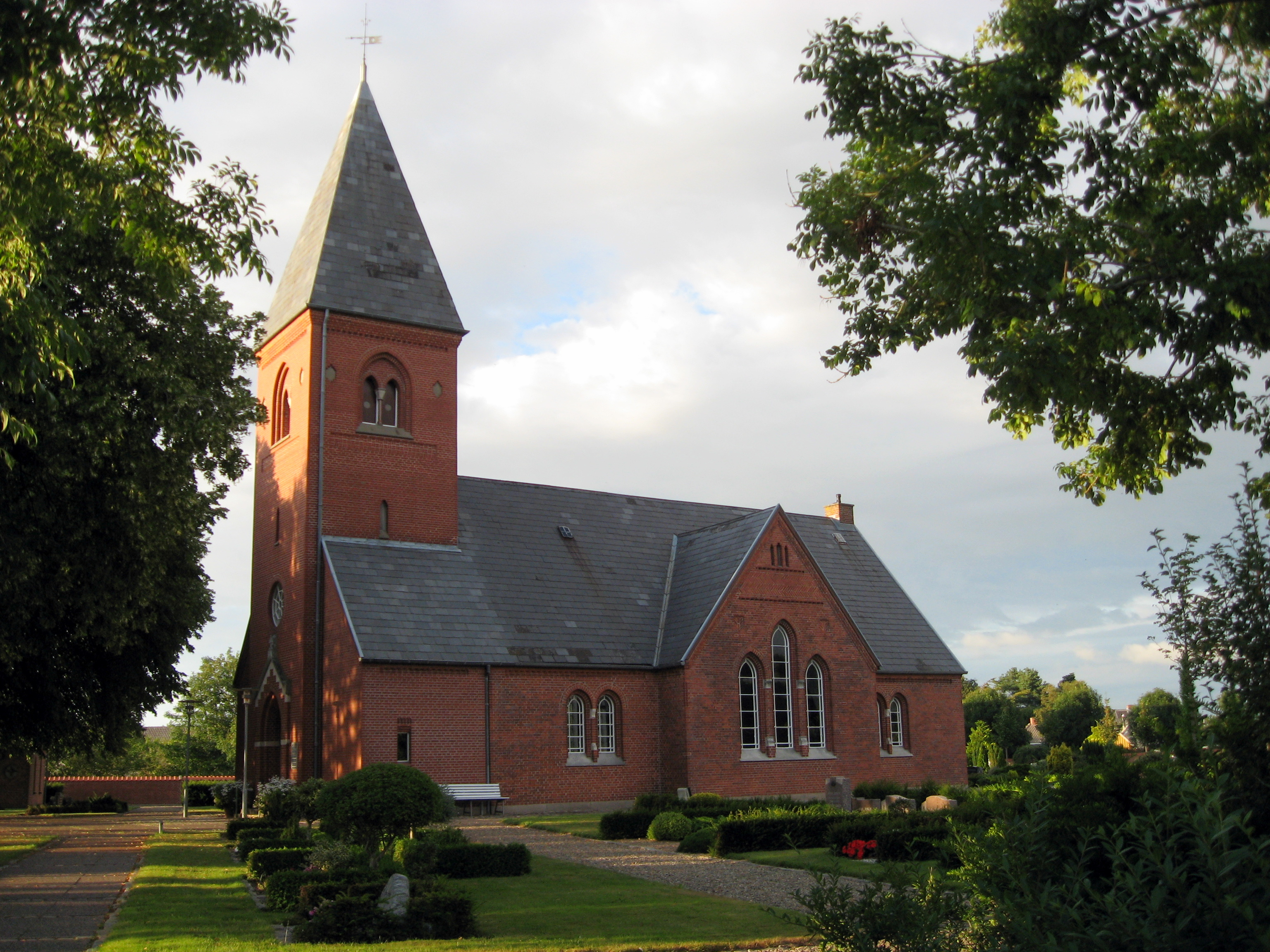
Vedsted Church

The municipality consisted of four parishes and four churches.

- Biersted Parish (Biersted Church)
- Gjøl Parish (Gjøl Church)
- Vedsted Parish (Vedsted Church)
- Aaby Parish (Aaby Church)

== Symbols ==
Aabybro Municipality's coat of arms was two white swans on each side of a white sword. The background was blue.
