= Fjerritslev Municipality =

Fjerritslev Municipality Fjerritslev Kommune
- Former municipality
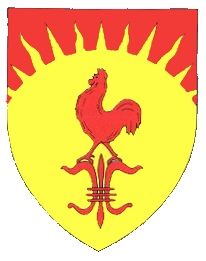
- Coat of arms

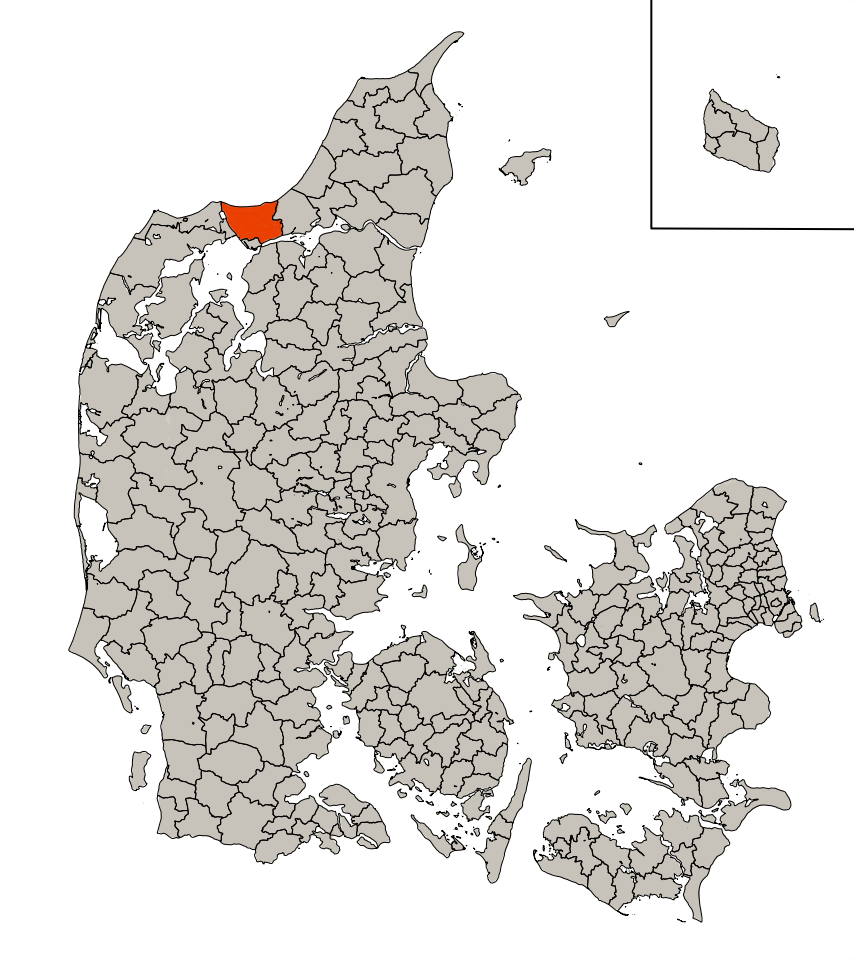
- Country: Denmark
- County: North Jutland
- Established: April 1, 1970
- Dissolved: December 31, 2006
- Seat: Fjerritslev

Government
  - Last mayor: Otto Kjær Larsen (V)

Area
  - Total: 289.65 km^{2} (111.83 sq mi)

Population (2006)
  - Total: 8,397
  - Density: 28.99/km^{2} (75.08/sq mi)
- Time zone: UTC1 (CET)
  - Summer (DST): UTC2 (CEST)
- Municipal code: 811

Until January 1, 2007 Fjerritslev Municipality was a municipality (Danish: kommune) in the former North Jutland County, on the North Jutlandic Island, bordering the Limfjord to the south and North Sea to the north. The municipality covered an area of 289.65 km^{2}, and had a total population of 8,397 (2006). Its last mayor was Otto Kjær Larsen, a member of the Venstre political party.

Fjerritslev Municipality bordered Brovst Municipality to the east, Løgstør Municipality to the south and the municipalities of Thisted and Hanstholm Municipality to the west.

The municipality ceased to exist as the result of Kommunalreformen 2007 (the Municipality Reform of 2007). It was merged with the Aabybro, Pandrup and Brovst municipalities to form the new Jammerbugt municipality. The new municipality belongs to the North Jutland Region.

== History ==
In the Middle Ages, Denmark was divided into syssels. The area that made up Fjerritslev Municipality was part of the hundred Han Hundred (Danish: Han Herred) and belonged to the syssel of Thysyssel. It later came under the fief of Aalborghus. In 1662 Han Hundred was merged with a number of hundreds and came under Åstrup, Sejlstrup, Børglum County. The county lasted until 1793. The area that made up Fjerritslev Municipality was under the hundred of Vester Han Hundred, which came under Thisted County in 1793. This county lasted until the 1970 Danish Municipal Reform where it came under the North Jutland County.

In 1842 Denmark was divided into smaller administrative divisions, namely parish municipalities (Danish: sognekommunner). The borders of these municipalities were largely based on the country's parishes. In the 1970 municipal reform these parish municipalities were dissolved. Seven parish municipalities were merged to create Fjerritslev Municipality. This municipality lasted until 2007 when it was merged with the municipalities of Brovst, Pandrup and Aabybro to form Jammerbugt Municipality.

=== Historical divisions ===
Historical municipal divisions of Fjerritslev Municipality
2007	1970	1842	Towns
Jammerbugt Mun.	Fjerritslev Mun.	Fjerritslev Parish Mun.	Fjerritslev
Jammerbugt Mun.	Fjerritslev Mun.	Haverslev-Bejstrup Parish Mun.	Bonderup
Jammerbugt Mun.	Fjerritslev Mun.	Skræm Parish Mun.	Skræm
Jammerbugt Mun.	Fjerritslev Mun.	Kettrup-Gøttrup Parish Mun.	Gøttrup
Jammerbugt Mun.	Fjerritslev Mun.	Hjortdal Parish Mun.	Hjortdal
Jammerbugt Mun.	Fjerritslev Mun.	Vester Torup-Klim Parish Mun.	Klim
Jammerbugt Mun.	Fjerritslev Mun.	Vester Torup-Klim Parish Mun.	Vester Torup
Jammerbugt Mun.	Fjerritslev Mun.	Vust Parish Mun.	Vust
Jammerbugt Mun.	Pandrup Mun.		
Jammerbugt Mun.	Brovst Mun.		
Jammerbugt Mun.	Aabybro Mun.		

== Towns ==
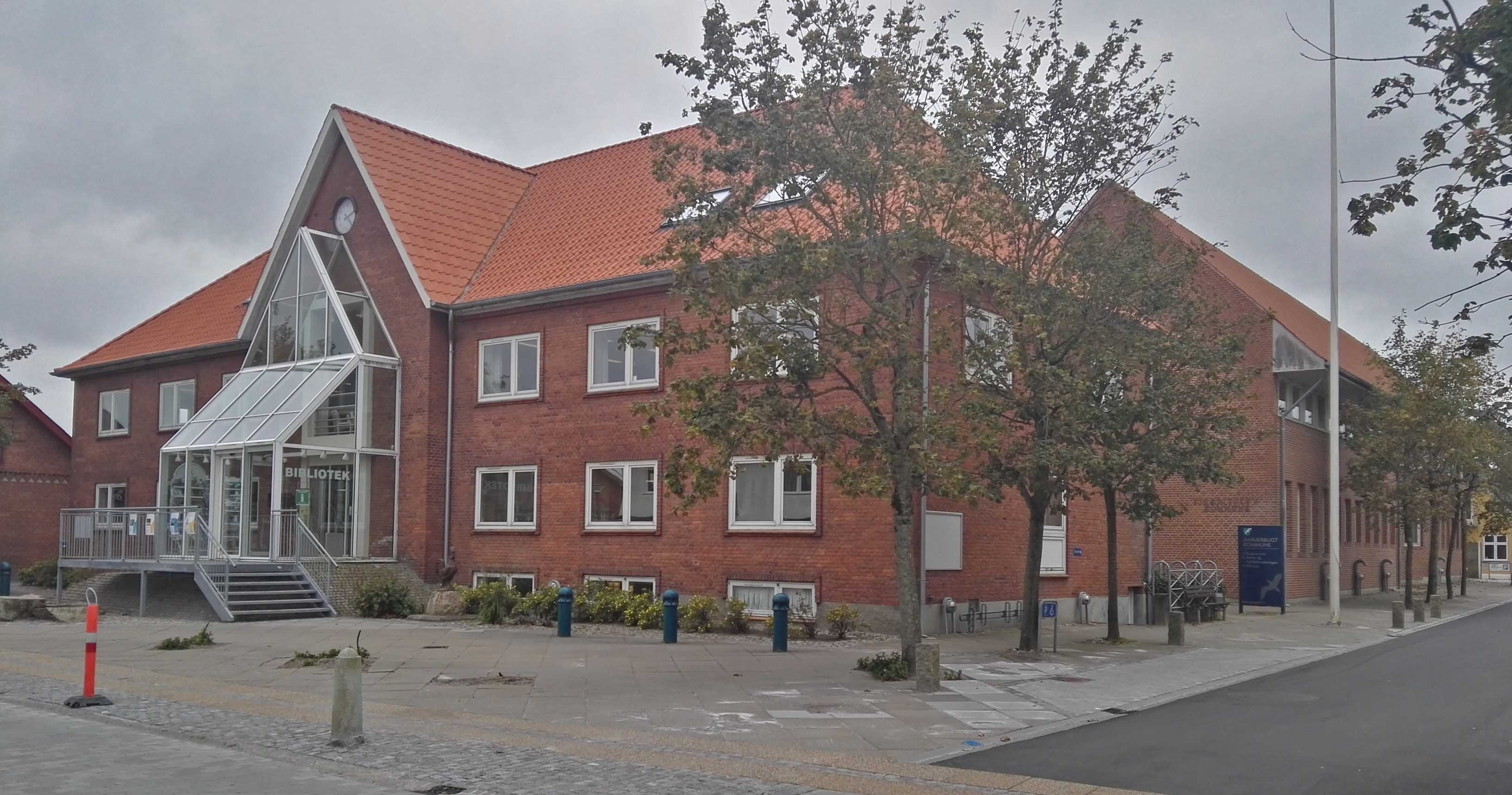
Former city hall in Fjerritslev.

Approximately 45% of the municipality's population lived in rural areas or small villages, and another approximate 40% in the town of Fjerritslev. The remaining 15% lived in the larger towns and villages of the municipality, these being Bonderup, Gøttrup, Klim and Vester Torup. Smaller villages in the municipality included Skræm, Vust and Hjortdal.

Fjerritslev was located centrally in the municipality.

Below are the populations from 2006 of the five larger settlements of the municipality.

Fjerritslev	3,375
Klim	529
Vester Torup	305
Bonderup	242
Gøttrup	220

== Politics ==
=== Municipal council ===
Below are the municipal council elected since the municipality's creation in 1970 and until 2001, which was the last election before the municipality was dissolved.

Election	Party				Total seats	Elected mayor
Election	A	V	Z	...	Total seats	Elected mayor
1970	4	3		10	17	Einar Damsgaard (...)
1974	4	2		11	17	Arne Simonsen (...)
1978	3	1	1	12	17	Arne Simonsen (...)
1981	3		1	13	17	Arne Simonsen (...)
1985	5			12	17	Olav Larsen (...)
1989	4		1	12	17	Olav Larsen (...)
1993	4		1	12	17	Johan Svaneborg (...)
1997	4	6	1	6	17	Otto Kjær Larsen (V)
2001	4	7		6	17	Otto Kjær Larsen (V)
Data from Statistikbanken.dk and editions of Kommunal Aarbog

=== Mayors ===
Since the creation of the municipality in 1970 and until it was dissolved in 2007, the mayors of Fjerritslev Municipality were:

#	Mayor	Party	Term
1	Einar Damsgaard	Local party	1970-1974
2	Arne Simonsen	Local party	1974-1986
3	Olav Larsen	Local party	1986-1994
4	Johan Svaneborg	Local party	1994-1998
5	Otto Kjær Larsen	Venstre	1998-2007

== Parishes ==
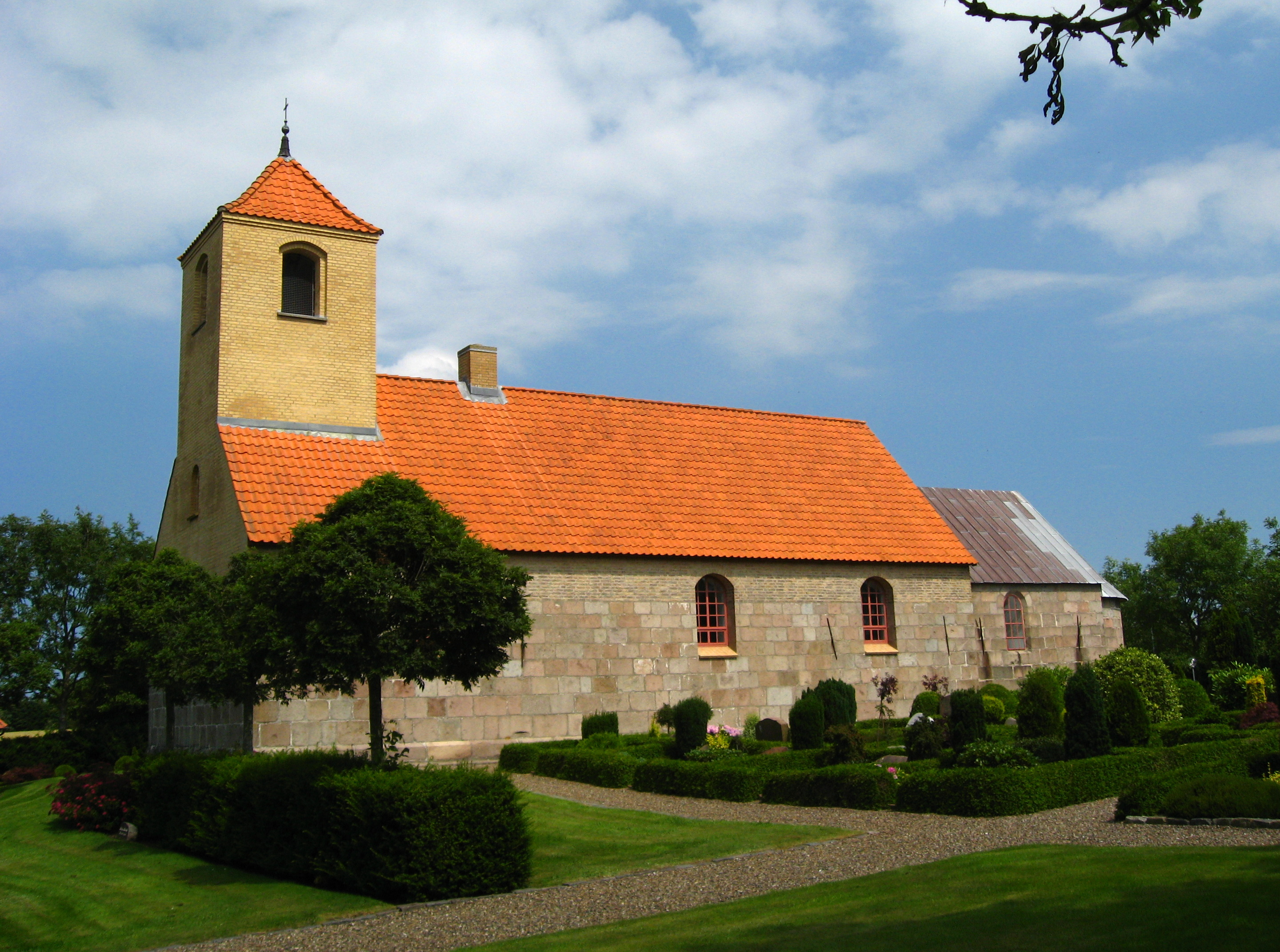
Skræm Church

The municipality consisted of ten parishes and eleven churches.

- Bejstrup Parish ( Bejstrup Church)
- Gøttrup Parish ( Gøttrup Church)
- Haverslev Parish (Haverslev Church)
- Hjortdal Parish (Hjortdal Church)
- Kettrup Parish (Kettrup Church)
- Klim Parish (Klim Church)
- Kollerup-Fjerritslev Parish (Fjerritslev Church, Kollerup Church)
- Skræm Parish ( Skræm Church)
- Vester Torup Parish (Vester Torup Church)
- Vust Parish ( Vust Church)

== Symbols ==
Fjerritslev Municipality's coat of arms was a red rooster standing in front of a yellow sun, on red background.
