= Pandrup =

- Town
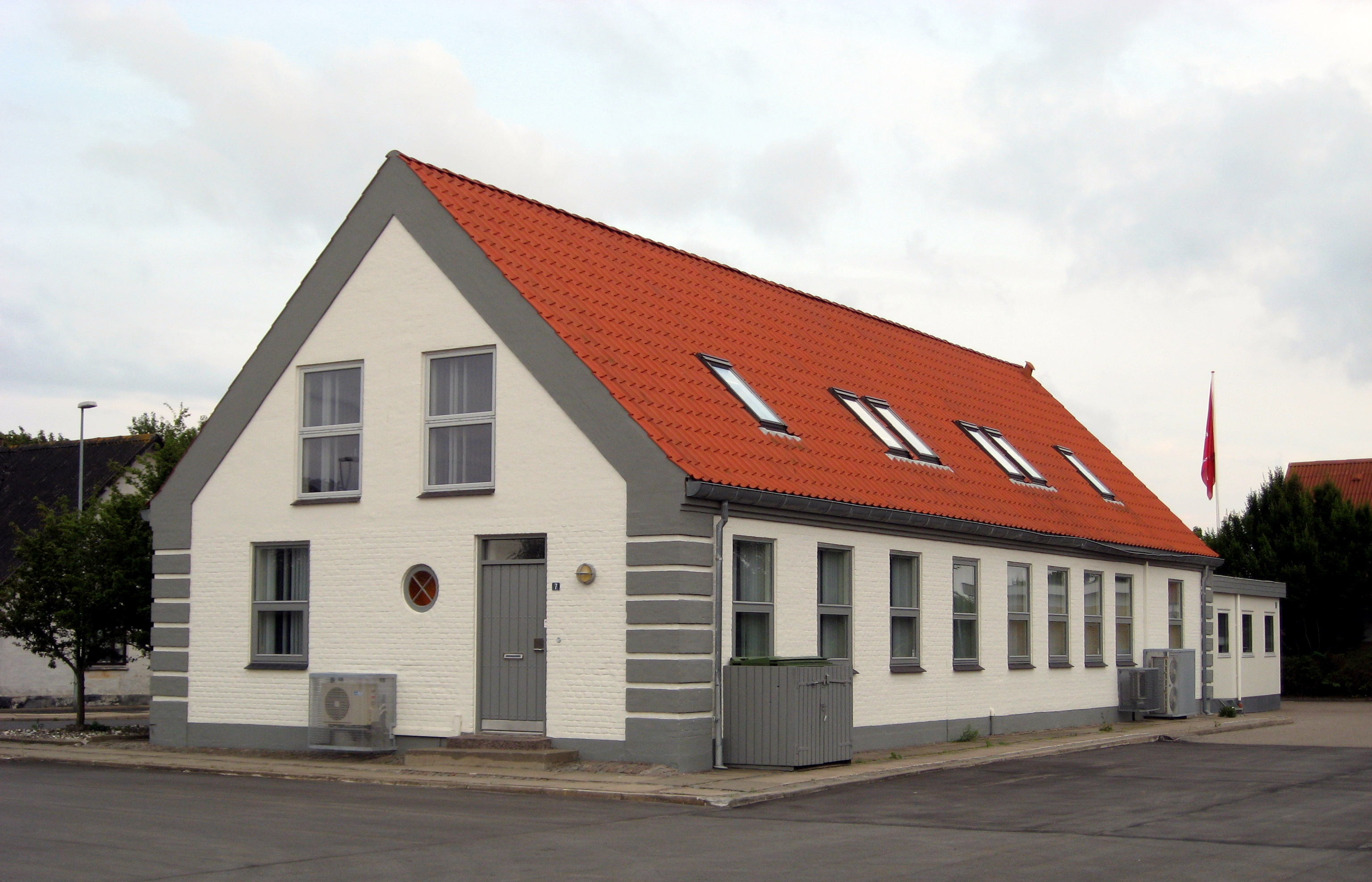
- Pandrup Station

- Location in the North Jutland Region
- Coordinates: 57°13′5″N 9°40′20″E
- Country: Denmark
- Region: North Jutland
- Municipality: Jammerbugt

Area
  - Urban: 2.7 km^{2} (1.0 sq mi)

Population (2026)
  - Urban: 2,849
  - Urban density: 1,100/km^{2} (2,700/sq mi)
- Time zone: UTC+1 (CET)
  - Summer (DST): UTC+2 (CEST)
- Postal code: 9490

Pandrup is a town in North Jutland, Denmark. It is located in Jammerbugt Municipality, 6 km northwest of Aabybro and 17 km southwest of Brønderslev.

Until 1 January 2007 Pandrup was the seat of the former Pandrup Municipality.

== History ==
Pandrup is first mentioned in 1470.

A train station was built in 1913 and was one of the Hjørring-Løkken-Aabybro railroad's largest stations. The station was built by Sylvius Knutzen. It was shut down in 1963.

In the 1970 Danish Municipal Reform three parish municipalities were merged to form Pandrup Municipality, with the municipality's seat and main town being Pandrup. The municipality lasted until 2007 where it was merged with Aabybro Municipality, Fjerritslev Municipality and Brovst Municipality to form Jammerbugt Municipality.

== Notable people ==
- Ole Christensen (born 1955), politician and former MEP
- Pernille Holmsgaard (born 1984), handball player
- Amalie Vangsgaard (born 1996), footballer
