= Pensioners' Party (Denmark) =

Pensioners' Party Pensionistpartiet
- Leader: None
- Founder: Hans Hansen
- Founded: 1976
- Dissolved: 2004
- Ideology: Pensioner's Interest (Single-Issue Politics)

Election symbol
- P

The Pensioners' Party (Danish: Pensionistpartiet) was a political party in Denmark founded by Hans Hansen in 1976. It was dissolved in 2004 after not managing to run for the 2005 Folketing election.

== Election results ==
=== Parliament (Folketing) ===
| Date | Votes | | | Seats | |
| Date | # | % | ± pp | # | ± |
|---|---|---|---|---|---|
| 1977 | 26,889 | 0.9% | New | 0 / 179 | New |
| 1979-2001 | Did not run. | | | | |

=== Municipal elections ===
| Date | Seats | |
| Date | # | ± |
|---|---|---|
| 1978 | 0 / 4,759 | New |
| 1981-2001 | Did not run. | |

=== Amts elections ===
| Date | Votes | Seats | |
| Date | Votes | # | ± |
|---|---|---|---|
| 1978 | 1 288 | 0 / 370 | New |
| 1981-2001 | Did not run. | | |
