= Listed buildings in Jammerbugt Municipality =

This is a list of listed buildings in Jammerbugt Municipality, Denmark.

== Listed buildings ==
=== 9440 Aabybro ===
Listing name	Image	Location	Coordinates	Description
Birkelse		Kammerherrensvej 62, 9440 Aabybro	57°9′1.52″N 9°42′24.17″E	Protected 1918.
Birkelse		Kammerherrensvej 62A, 9440 Aabybro	57°8′58.97″N 9°42′11.54″E	Main building.
Birkelse		Kammerherrensvej 62B, 9440 Aabybro	57°8′58.56″N 9°42′13.29″E	South wing of main building.
Birkelse		Kammerherrensvej 62C, 9440 Aabybro	57°8′58.91″N 9°42′15.3″E	South-east wing of main building.
Birkelse		Kammerherrensvej 62D, 9440 Aabybro	57°9′0.56″N 9°42′16.25″E	Residential wing.

=== 9460 Brovst ===
Listing name	Image	Location	Coordinates	Description
Bratskov		Fredensdal 6, 9460 Brovst	57°6′6.56″N 9°31′7.11″E	Main building and northern side wing. From 1550
Bratskov		Fredensdal 8, 9460 Brovst	57°6′6.1″N 9°31′8.23″E	Southern side wing.
Kokkedal		Kokkedalsvej 17, 9460 Brovst	57°3′51.72″N 9°28′46.96″E	
Oxholm		Vestre Skovvej 1, 9460 Brovst	57°3′46.7″N 9°34′23.42″E	Protected 1950.
Rectory Barn in Østerby; Præstegårdsladen i Østerby		Østerbyvej 1, 9460 Brovst	57°3′26.41″N 9°36′32.17″E	Protected 1992.

=== 9492 Blokhus ===
Listing name	Image	Location	Coordinates	Description
Kancelligården		Strandvejen 4A, 9492 Blokhus	57°15′9.78″N 9°35′3.34″E	Protected 1930.
Strandingskroen		Høkervej 2, 9492 Blokhus	57°15′7.58″N 9°34′57.92″E	South and west wings. Protected 1959.
Strandingskroen		Høkervej 2B, 9492 Blokhus	57°15′8.33″N 9°34′58.75″E	North wing.
Strandingskroen		Høkervej 2D, 9492 Blokhus	57°15′7.5″N 9°34′59.87″E	East wing.

=== 9690 Fjerritslev ===
Listing name	Image	Location	Coordinates	Description
Grønnestrand Windmill; Grønnestrand Vindmølle		Grønnestrandsvej 228, 9690 Fjerritslev	57°8′26.64″N 9°16′58.13″E	Wind mill. Protected 1986.
Klim Chalk Oven; Klim Kalkværk		Klim Strandvej 68, 9690 Fjerritslev	57°6′13.6″N 9°10′13.66″E	Protected 1997.
Sandagervej 49		Sandagervej 49, 9690 Fjerritslev	57°5′20.17″N 9°16′31.14″E	Protected 2008.
Sandagervej 52		Østergade 53, 9690 Fjerritslev	57°5′17.63″N 9°16′29.95″E	Protected 2008.
Slettestrand Rescue Station; Slettestrand Redningsstation		Slettestrandvej 158, 9690 Fjerritslev	57°9′17.02″N 9°21′57.82″E	Protected 1995.
Svinkløvvej 547		Svinkløvvej 547, 9690 Fjerritslev	57°9′0.88″N 9°19′30.59″E	Protected 1987.
