= Ole Christensen =

Ole Christensen MEP
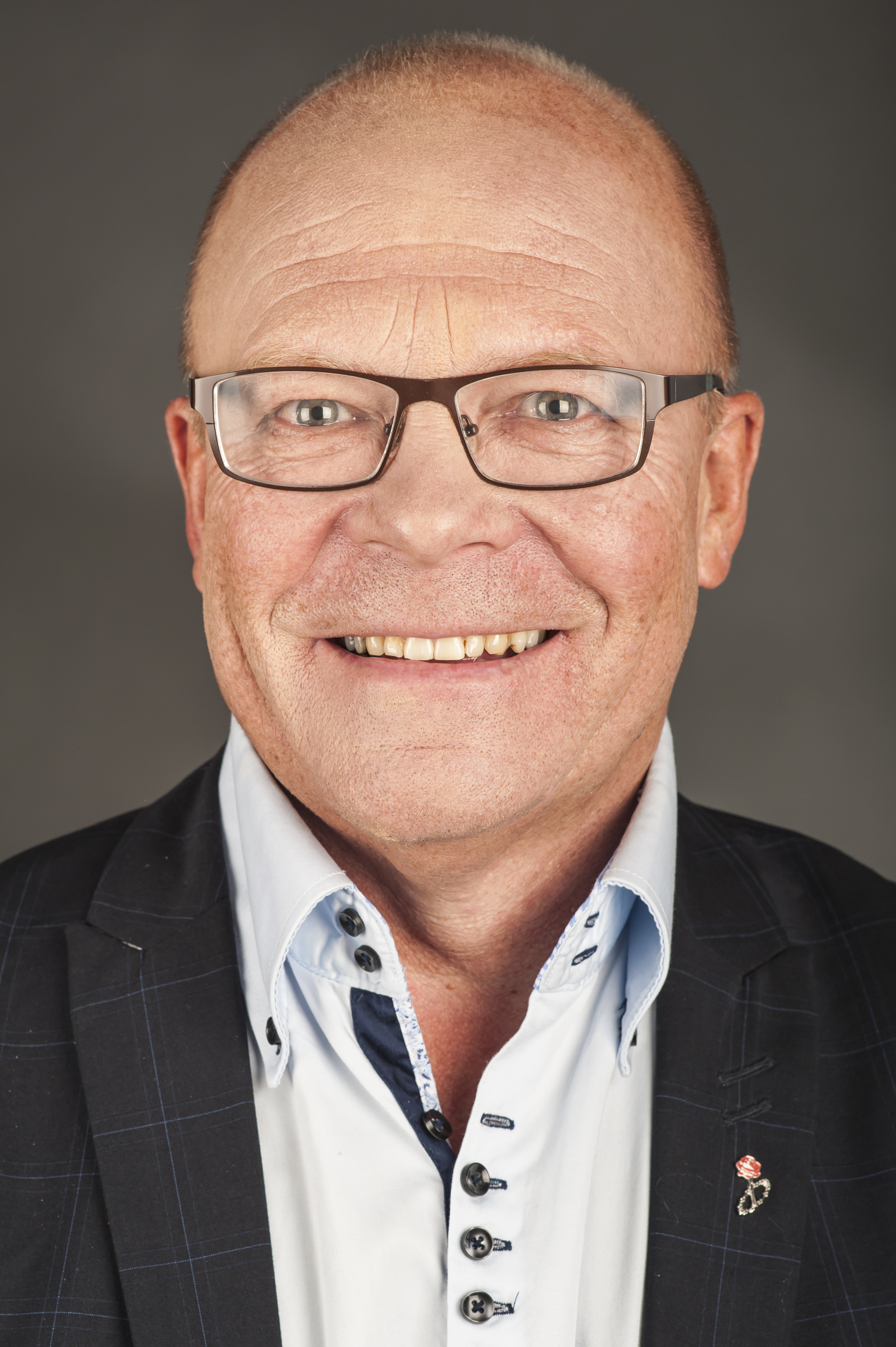

Member of the European Parliament
- In office 2004–2019
- Constituency: Denmark

Personal details
- Born: 7 May 1955 (age 70) Pandrup, North Jutland, Denmark
- Party: Danish; Social Democrats; EU; Progressive Alliance of Socialists and Democrats

Ole Klæstrup Christensen (born 7 May 1955) is a Danish politician who served as a Member of the European Parliament (MEP) from 2004 until 2019. He is a member of the Social Democrats, part of the Party of European Socialists.

During his time in parliament, Christensen served on the European Parliament's Committee on Employment and Social Affairs. He was also a substitute member of the European Parliament Committee on Fisheries and a member of the delegation to the ACP–EU Joint Parliamentary Assembly.

== Career ==
Christensen worked as an ironmonger from 1971 to 1976, before joining the Queen's Lifeguard Regiment as a Junior NCO (1976–90). During his service, he was a senior shop steward and member of the National Executive of the Army Privates' and Corporals' Association, a trade union for non-commissioned army personnel.

He was Vice-Chairman of the Danish TUC in Brovst (1984–1988), and Chairman of Brovst constituency organisation (1984–1989). He then served as a member of Brovst town council (1989–2004), including terms of office as Mayor (1998–2002) and Deputy Mayor (2002–2004).

Having matriculated at the Aalborg School of Commerce in 1979, and graduated Bachelor of Commerce in 1984, he qualified and worked as an instructor at Aalborg Training School in 1990 before becoming a business consultant with Aalborg Trade Council (1992–98). He has been involved in various other trade union and local government organisations in North Jutland.
