= Fjerritslev =

- Town
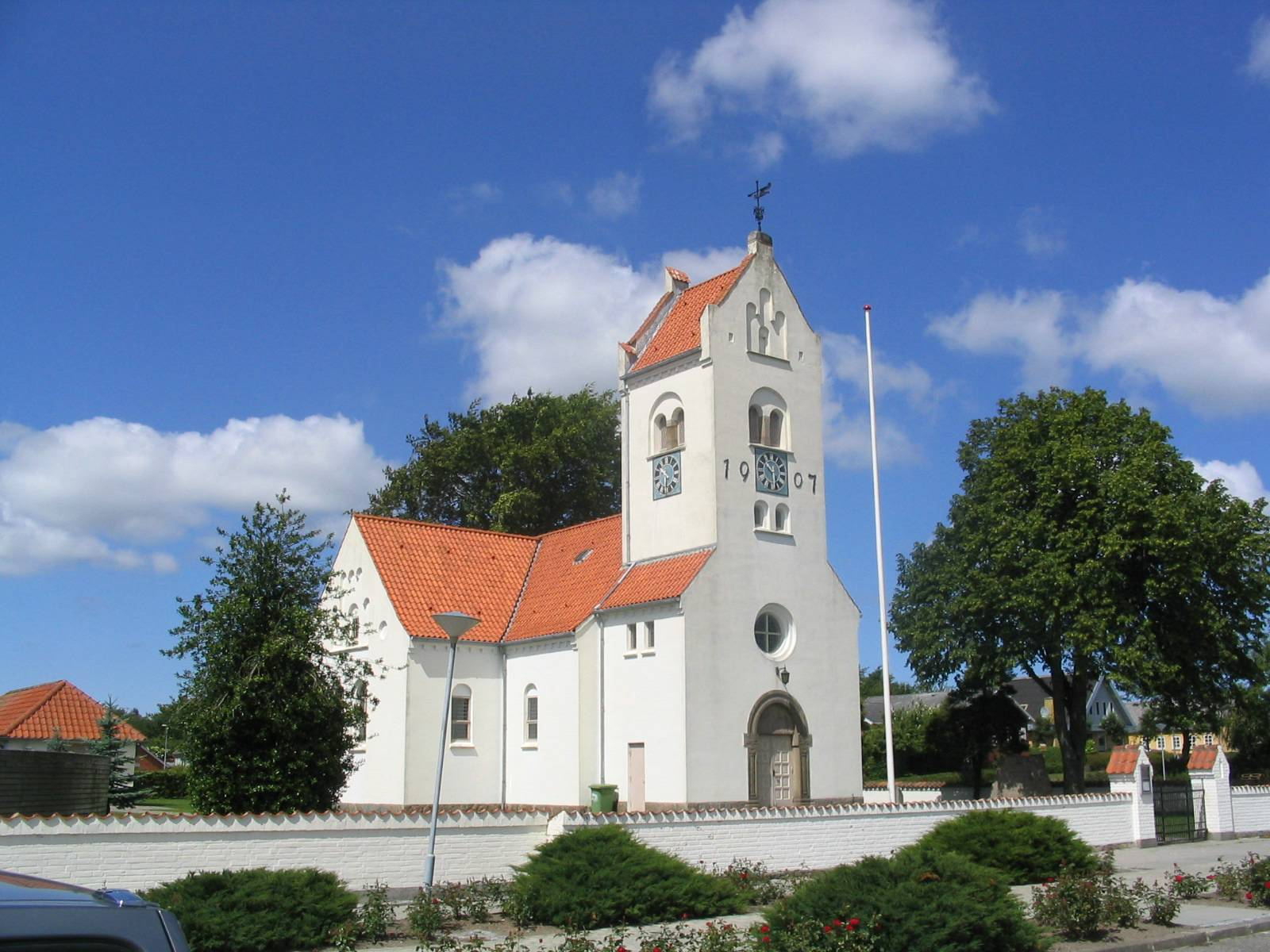
- Fjerritslev Church

- Location in the North Jutland Region
- Coordinates: 57°05′N 9°16′E
- Country: Denmark
- Region: North Jutland
- Municipality: Jammerbugt

Area
  - Urban: 2.8 km^{2} (1.1 sq mi)

Population (2026)
  - Urban: 3,300
  - Urban density: 1,200/km^{2} (3,100/sq mi)
- Time zone: UTC+1 (CET)
  - Summer (DST): UTC+2 (CEST)
- Postal code: DK-9690 Fjerritslev
- Website: Fjerritslev.dk

Fjerritslev is a town in North Jutland, Denmark. It is located in Jammerbugt Municipality, 13 km north of Løgstør, 37 km northeast of Thisted and 30 km southwest of Aabybro.

Until 1 January 2007 Fjerritslev was the seat of the former Fjerritslev Municipality.

== History ==
Fjerritslev is mentioned in 1487 under the name Fieridsleff.

Until the middle of the 1800s Fjerritslev only consisted of a series of spread-out houses and farms. A tavern was built in Fjerritslev in 1840, which began the expansion of the town. Following the tavern were other establishments, including a post office, bank, school and brewery. With the construction of the train station in 1897, the town began to rapidly expand.

During the German occupation of Denmark in 1940-45 multiple buildings in the town were occupied by the Germans. This included the school, which forced the locals to move their teaching facilities to the town's tavern.

The train station in Fjerritslev was shut down in 1969.

In the 1970 Danish Municipal Reform, seven parish municipalities were merged to form Fjerritslev Municipality, with the municipality's seat and main town being Fjerritslev. The municipality lasted until 2007 where it was merged with Aabybro Municipality, Pandrup Municipality and Brovst Municipality to form Jammerbugt Municipality.

In 1979 Fjerritslev Gymnasium (upper secondary high school) was founded. As of 2022, it has approximately 375 students and also offers Higher Preparatory Examination (HF) and Higher Commercial Examination (HHX). Since 2016 it has been possible for the students to also stay at Fjerritslev College. This has made Fjerritslev Gymnasium more attractive for students from other regions of Denmark and even from abroad.

== Fjerritslev Brewery and Local Museum ==
Fjerritslev Brewery and Local Museum (Danish: Fjerritslev Bryggeri- og Egnsmuseum) is located in Fjerritslev. It is both a brewery museum and a local museum. The brewery, originally named P. Kjeldgaards Bryggeri, originates from 1885, where it was started by Niels Borup and Peter Bauer. Per Kjeldgaard joined in 1887. When Kjeldgaard died in 1919 his wife, Kathrine Kjeldgaard, took over leading the brewery. She became the only Danish female brewery owner until her death in 1950. Her daughter, Kirsten Kjeldgaard, took over and continued the brewery until 1968 where it was shut down. She lived in the old brewery until 1982 where she died. The current museum was established one year later.

== Notable residents ==
- Rikke Nielsen (born 1977), handball player
- Thomas Danielsen (born 1983), politician and MF
- Mikkel B. Andersen (born 1996), speedway rider
