= Brovst =

- Town
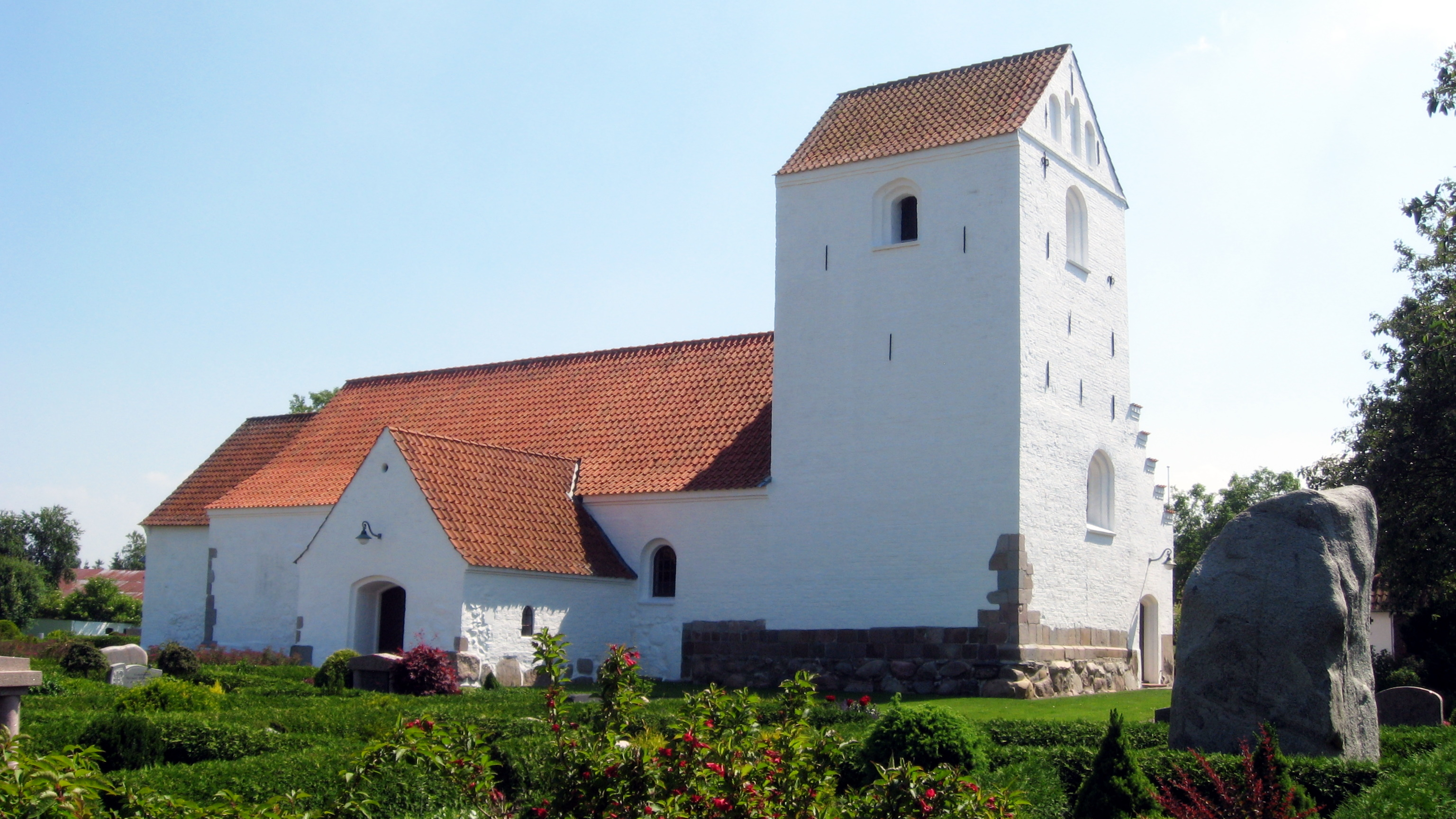
- Brovst Church

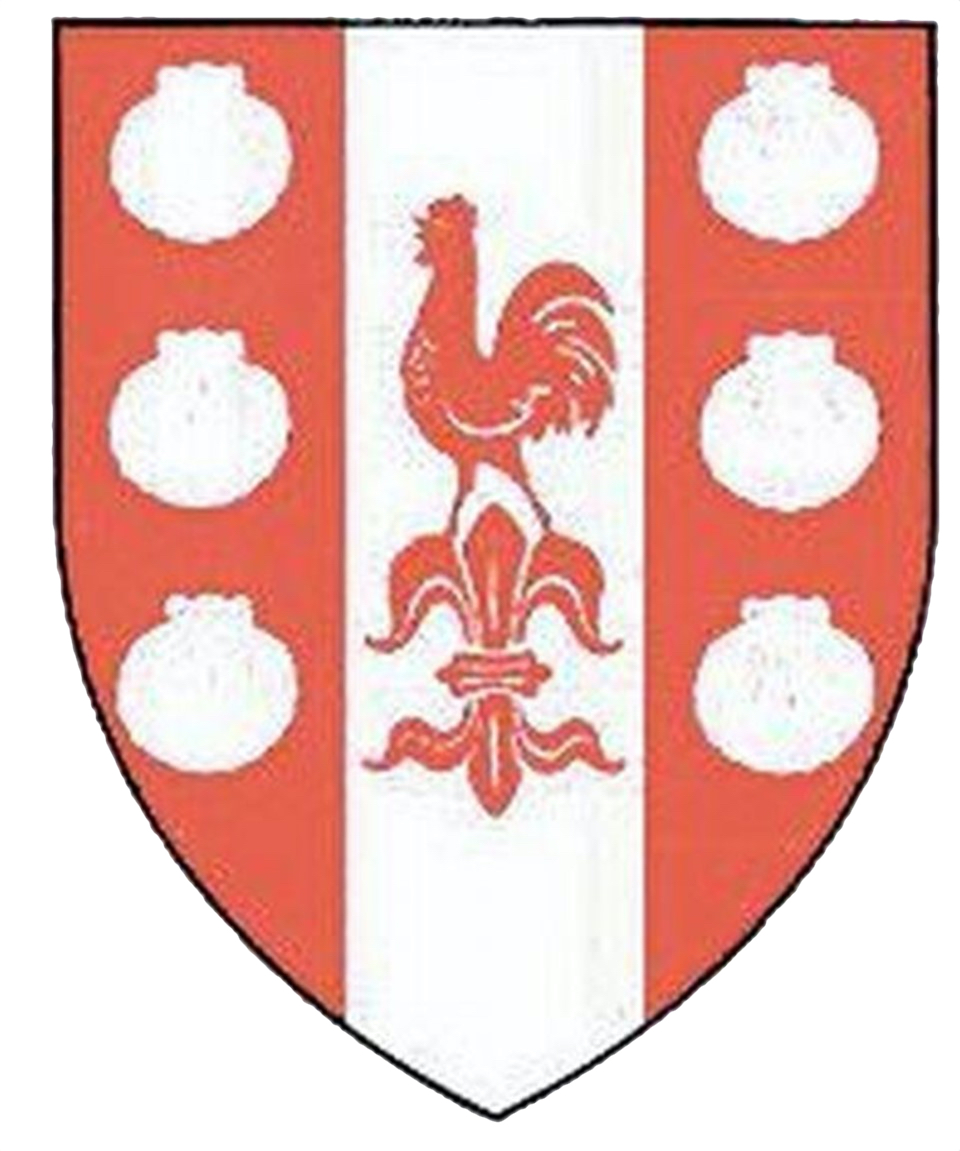
- Coat of arms

- Location in the North Jutland Region Brovst (Denmark)
- Coordinates: 57°05′51″N 9°31′23″E
- Country: Denmark
- Region: North Jutland
- Municipality: Jammerbugt

Area
  - Total: 2.3 km^{2} (0.89 sq mi)

Population (2026)
  - Total: 2,665
  - Density: 1,200/km^{2} (3,000/sq mi)
- Time zone: UTC+1 (CET)
  - Summer (DST): UTC+2 (CEST)
- Postal code: 9460

Brovst is a town in North Jutland, Denmark. It is located in Jammerbugt Municipality, 16 km east of Fjerritslev, 14 km southwest of Aabybro and 2 km east and northeast of the villages of Ny Skovsgård and Skovsgård.

Until 1 January 2007 Brovst was the seat of the former Brovst Municipality.

== History ==
Brovst is first mentioned in 1458 as Brosth.

A train station was built in Brovst in 1897, and Brovst was a stop on the Fjerritslev-Nørresundby railroad throughout the railroad's history. When the railroad was shut down in 1969, Brovst Station was also closed.

== Sport ==
Brovst Speedway Club is a motorcycle speedway club, who competed in the Danish Speedway League from 1973 until 2010, and then again in 2021. The Brovst Speedway Center is located at Mou Kær, on the Over Søen 12, from Brovst to Tranum.

== Notable residents ==
- Hans Nielsen (born 1959), speedway rider
- Ane Halsboe-Jørgensen (born 1983), politician and member of the Folketing
- Nicolaj Ritter (born 1992), football player
