= Aabybro =

- Town
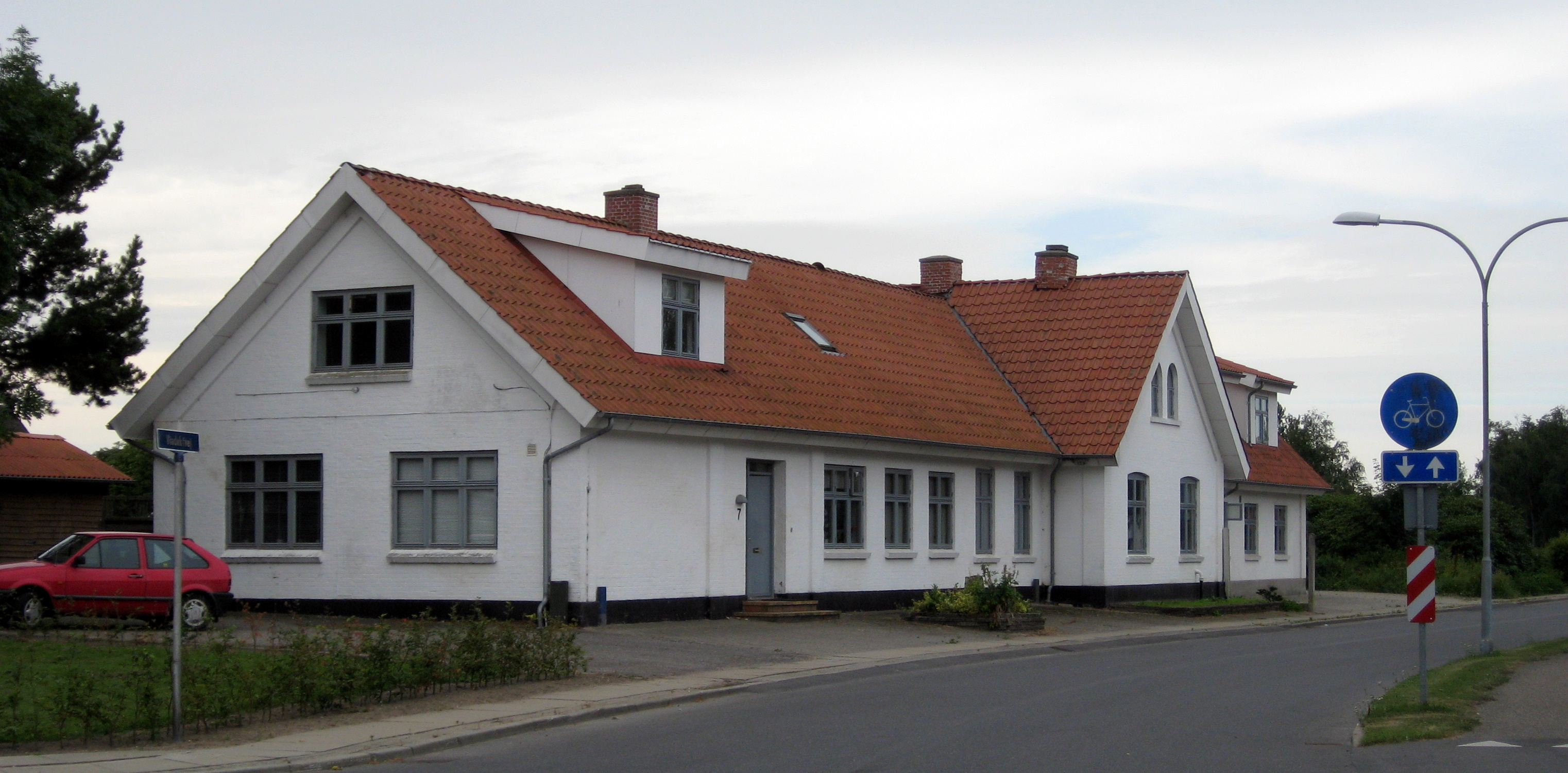
- The former Aabybro Station

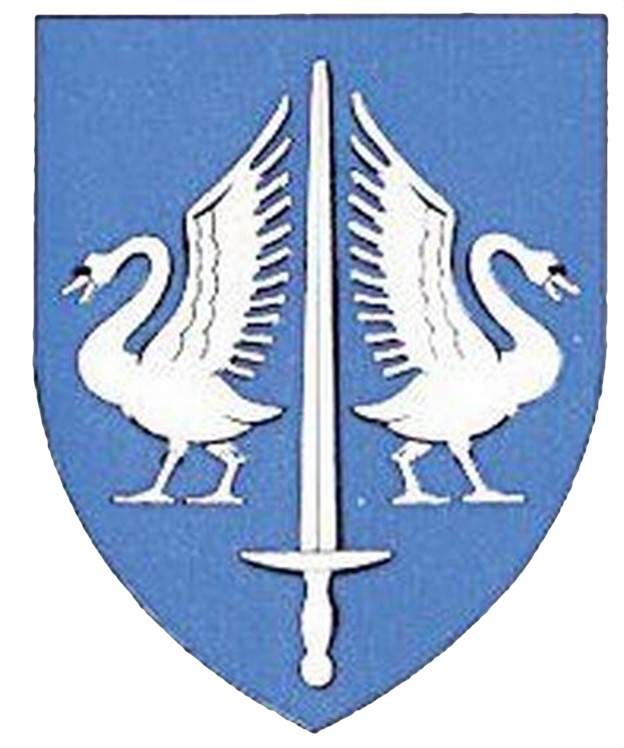
- Coat of arms

- Location within North Jutland Region Location within Denmark Location within Europe
- Coordinates: 57°09′N 9°45′E
- Country: Denmark
- Region: North Jutland
- Municipality: Jammerbugt

Area
  - Total: 4.5 km^{2} (1.7 sq mi)

Population (2026)
  - Total: 6,773
  - Density: 1,500/km^{2} (3,900/sq mi)
  - Gender: 3,306 males and 3,467 females
- Time zone: UTC+1 (CET)
  - Summer (DST): UTC+2 (CEST)
- Postal code: DK-9440 Aabybro

Aabybro or Åbybro is a town in North Jutland, Denmark. The town is the seat of Jammerbugt Municipality, and is the biggest town in the municipality. Aabybro is located 17 km southwest of Brønderslev, 16 km northwest of Aalborg and 30 km northeast of Fjerritslev.

== History ==
Aabybro was a railway town from 1897 until 1969. Before the construction of the station, there was a very small settlement in the area. The station brought more traffic and expanded the town. It was a stop on the Hjørring-Løkken-Aabybro rail line, which operated between 1913 and 1963.

Aabybro was formerly the seat of Aabybro Municipality. The municipality was established in 1970 and lasted until 2007, when the municipality was merged with the municipalities of Pandrup, Brovst and Fjerritslev to form Jammerbugt Municipality.

== Notable residents ==
- Lone Drøscher Nielsen (born 1964), wildlife conservationist
- Kasper Pedersen (born 1993), football player
- Skipper Clement (born 1485) Rebellion leader
