= Thisted County =

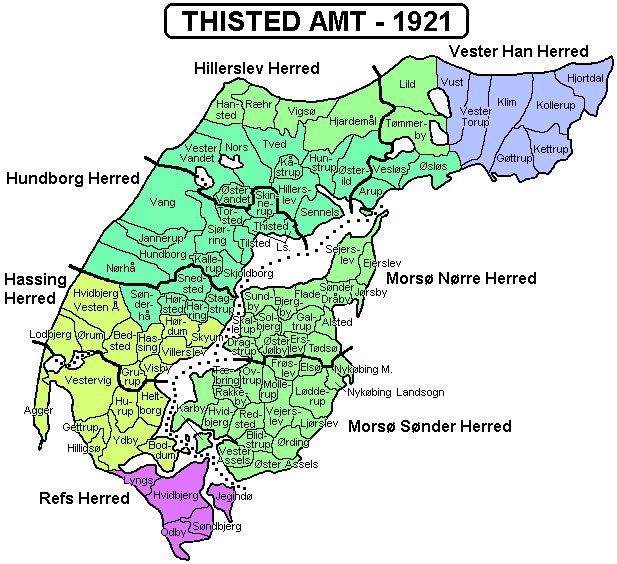
Thisted County. Areas in green show municipalities according to the 1970 reform that were transferred to Viborg County. The purple region became a municipality in Ringkjøbing County, and the blue region joined North Jutland County.

Thisted County (Danish: Thisted Amt) is a former province in Denmark, located on the north-westernmost part of the country It encompassed the westernmost part of the island of Vendsyssel-Thy. It was dissolved in 1970 when the bulk of it was merged into Viborg County while other regions joined the counties of Ringkjøbing and North Jutland.

Thisted County featured the market towns (købstæder) of Nykøbing Mors and Thisted.

== 1970 administrative reform ==
Thisted County was dissolved in the 1970 administrative reform and the county was divided into municipalities belonging to three counties:

- North Jutland County (north eastern region)
  - Fjerritslev
- Ringkjøbing County (south eastern region)
  - Thyholm
- Viborg County (all other territories)
  - Hanstholm
  - Morsø
  - Sydthy
  - Thisted

== List of former hundreds (herreder) ==
- Hassing Herred
- Hillerslev Herred
- Hundborg Herred
- Morsø Nørre Herred
- Morsø Sønder Herred
- Refs Herred
- Vester Han Herred

== See also ==
- Thisted
