= Conservative People's Party (Denmark) =

Danish political party

Conservative People's Party Det Konservative Folkeparti
- Abbreviation: K C (Note: Official party letter on voting ballot)
- Chairperson: Mona Juul
- Founded: 22 February 1916; 110 years ago
- Preceded by: Højre; Free Conservatives; Moderate faction of Venstre
- Headquarters: Christiansborg; 1240 København K
- Youth wing: Young Conservatives
- Student wing: Conservative Students
- Membership (2022): ▲13,600
- Ideology: Conservatism; Liberal conservatism; Social conservatism; Green conservatism
- Political position: Centre-right
- European affiliation: European People's Party
- European Parliament group: European People's Party Group
- International affiliation: International Democracy Union
- Nordic affiliation: Conservative Group
- Colours: Dark green (official); Green (customary)
- Folketing: 13 / 179 (Note: Only 175 of the 179 seats in the Danish Parliament, the Folketing, are obtainable by Danish political parties as Greenland and the Faroe Islands are assigned two seats each due to their status as territories in the Kingdom of Denmark.)
- European Parliament: 1 / 15
- Regions: 19 / 205
- Municipalities: 343 / 2,436
- Mayors: 20 / 98

Election symbol
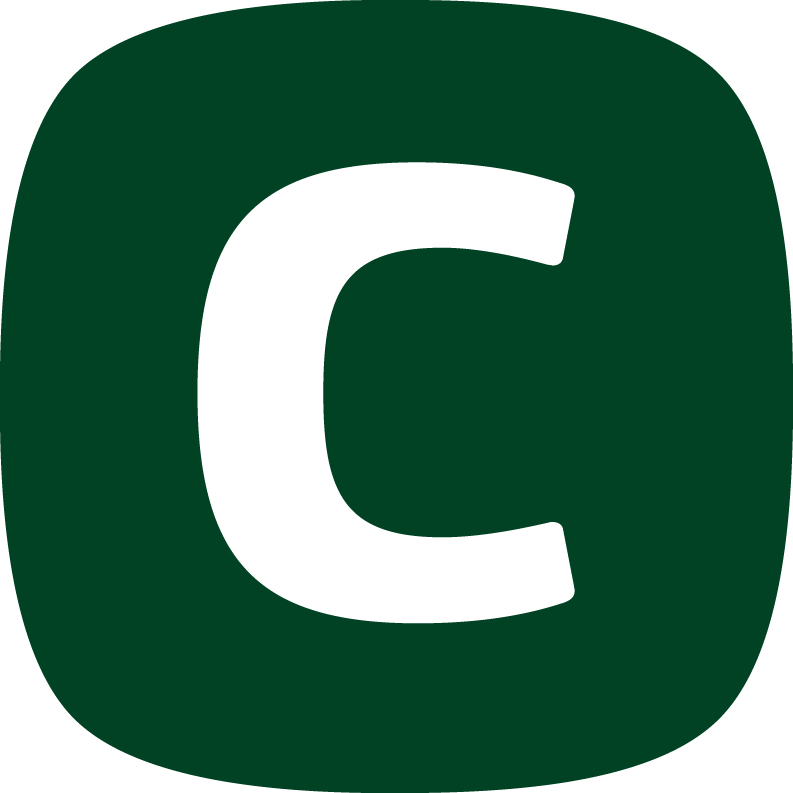

Website
- konservative.dk

The Conservative People's Party (Danish: Det Konservative Folkeparti, DKF), also known as The Conservatives (Danish: De Konservative, K), is a centre-right political party in Denmark. The party is a member of the International Democracy Union and the European People's Party.

== History ==
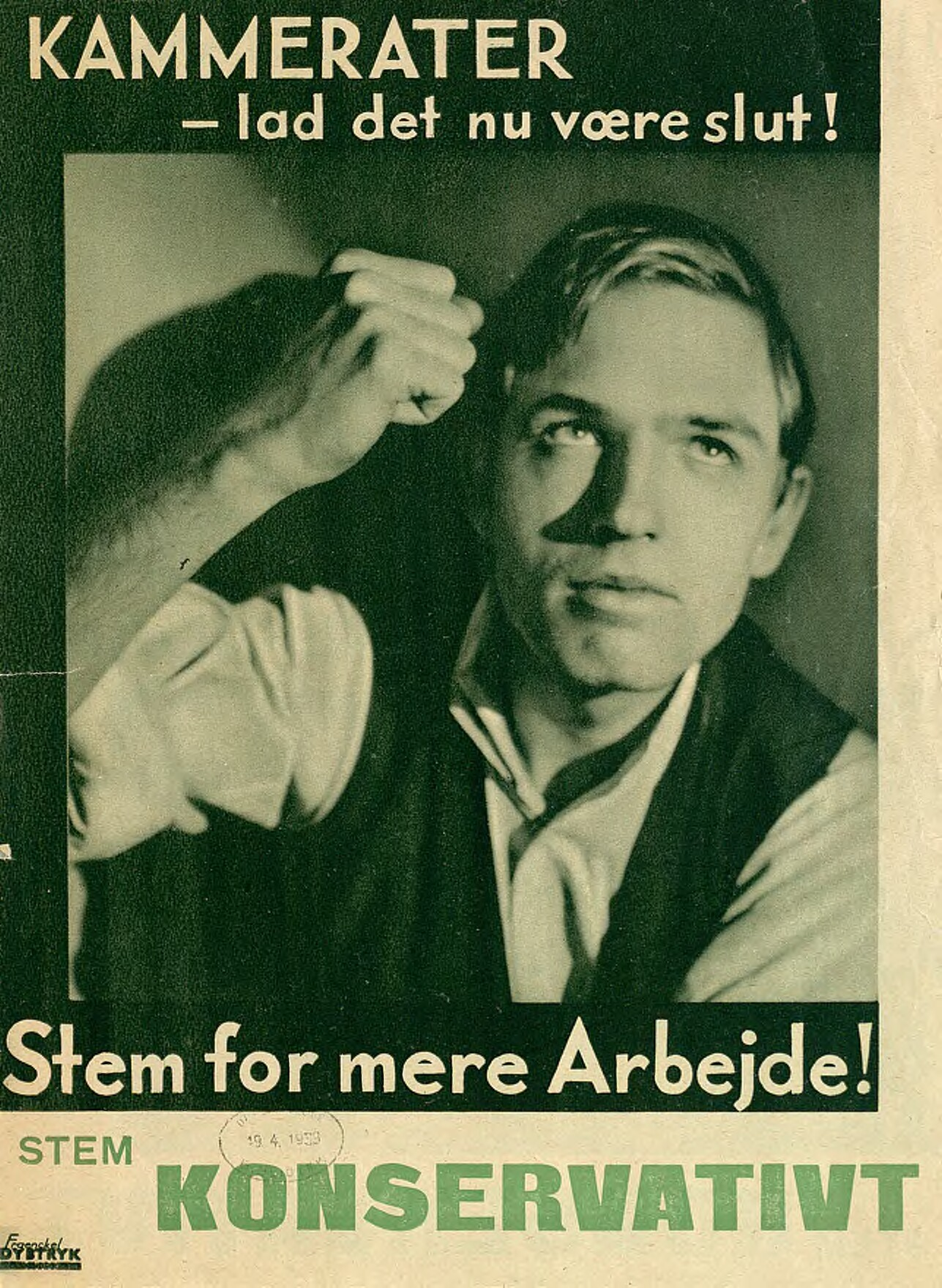
Election poster, 1939. It reads: "Comrades – let it now be over! Vote for more work! Vote Conservative".

The party was founded in 1916 based mostly on its predecessor, Højre ('Right') after its downfall, but also on the Free Conservatives and a moderate faction of the liberal party Venstre ('Left'). The party was a part of the coalition government during World War II, where the leader John Christmas Møller provided the voice for BBC London's daily radio to Denmark. However, while a number of conservatives participated in the resistance movement, some conservatives were sympathetic to fascist ideology, and the youth wing of the party praised several fascist movements in Europe during the 1930s.

Since World War II, the party has participated in several coalition governments, but only one Prime Minister of Denmark, Poul Schlüter, has come from this party; he served as prime minister from 1982 to 1993. His government had to resign after the Tamil Case, when the Justice Minister, Erik Ninn-Hansen (himself a former Conservative leader), was impeached.

The party used its first logo in 1950, consisting of the serif-letter "C" coloured green. On 24 August 2000, the Conservative People's Party rebranded itself as the Conservatives, and at the same time retired its 50-year-old green serif-letter "C" logo, thus launching a new logo for the first time since 1950. The new logo was a circle which contains a chartreuse circle with the letter "C".

From the 2001 parliament elections until 2011, the Conservative People's Party was the junior partner in a coalition government led by Venstre. In the 2004 European parliament elections, the party won a seat. Four months later, on 23 October 2004, it adopted a logo consisting of a green circle-squared box that contains a dark-green screen with the letter "C" that is coloured green; the "Konservative" wordmark is placed below the symbol, though it too is also coloured green. The member is currently Bendt Bendtsen, who is a member of the EPP Group in the European Parliament. In the 2014 European election, the party garnered 9.1% of the national vote, retaining Bendtsen's seat as MEP.

In the 2011 parliamentary election for the Folketing (Danish national parliament), the Conservative People's Party won eight seats, 10 fewer than it had won in the previous election in 2007, and it received 4.9% of the vote, placing the party in eighth place nationally. On 27 September 2013, the Conservative People's Party received the current version of its logo: the colour of the letter "C" was changed to white, the circle-square retained its dark-green colour, and the circle-squared line was removed from it. At the same time, the party gave up being known as the Conservatives, reverting to its former name as the Conservative People's Party.

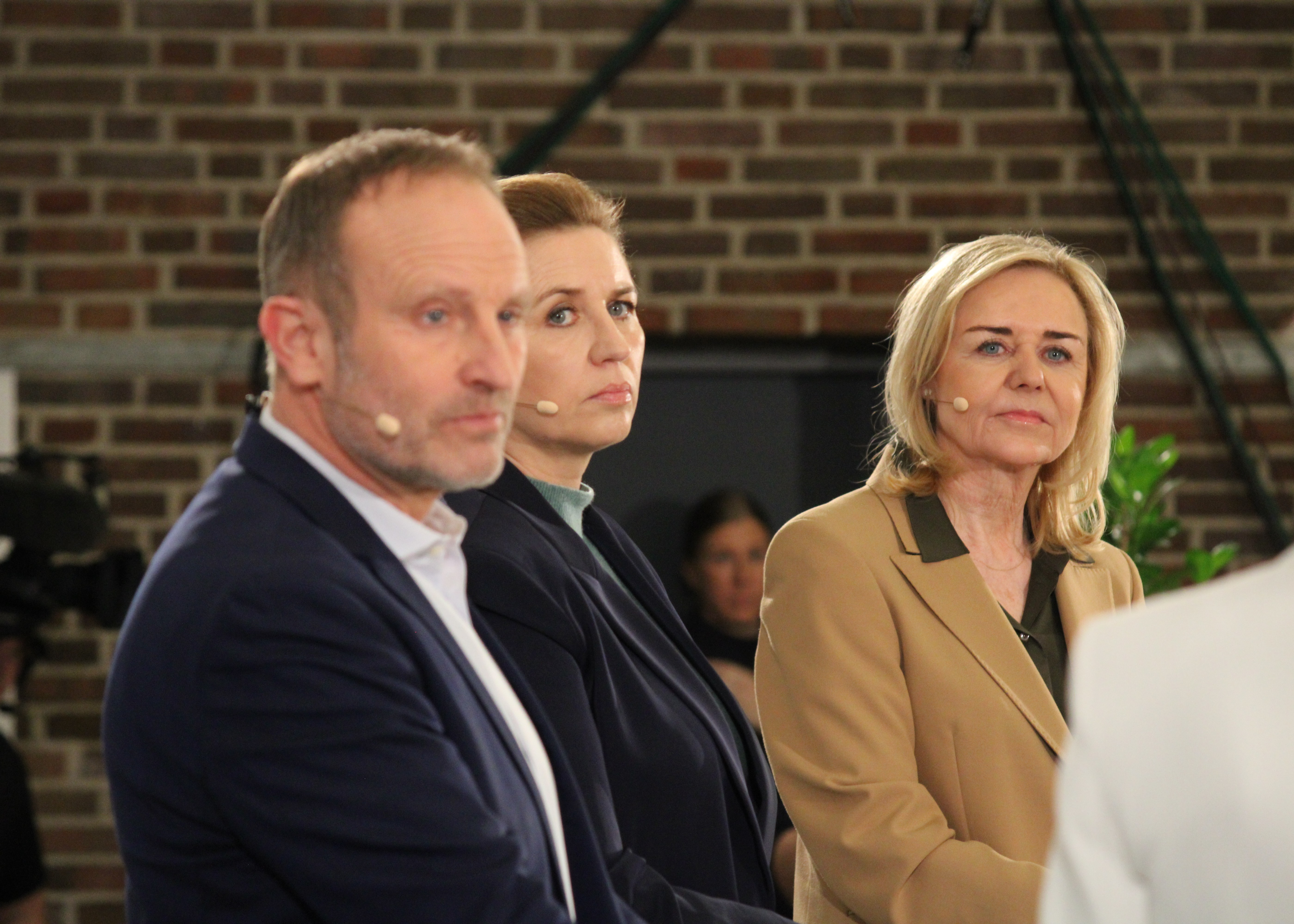
Mona Juul (right) during a debate with Martin Lidegaard and Mette Frederiksen in Nyborg, January 2026

At the 2015 election, the party did badly and was reduced to a mere six seats, which made it the smallest party in the Folketing. But Søren Pape Poulsen (who had taken over as leader the previous year) managed to double the party's seats to 12 in the 2019 election with 6.6% of the vote. After that election, several opinion polls indicated that the party enjoyed wider popular support than Venstre, but at the 2022 election gained just 5.5%, following an election campaign significantly influenced by affairs concerning Pape Poulsen's personal life. Poulsen died suddenly at the age of 52 on 2 March 2024, leaving the party leadership vacant.

== Organization ==
The youth branch of the Conservative People's Party, albeit an independent organisation, is Young Conservatives, the earliest formed youth organisation in Denmark, founded in December 1904, and believed to be one of the oldest in the world, preceding the Conservative People's Party by 10 years. The student branch is Conservative Students, likewise an independent organisation, which has branches at all Danish Universities.

The party remains committed to a centre-right alliance, working most closely with the liberal Venstre and somewhat less closely with the right-wing populist Danish People's Party. The Conservative People's Party cooperated with the Social Liberal Party during its time in power in the 1980s, and also with the centre-left government under Poul Nyrup Rasmussen in the 1990s.

== Ideology and policies ==
The party's current purpose clause states: "The Conservative People's Party aims to gather everyone who joins the party's program and to work for the spread of conservative views." The party has named Edmund Burke as one of its intellectual sources.

The Conservative People's Party presently advocates individual freedom and responsibility, a free market economy, respecting private property, the importance of community for the individual, modernization of the public sector, decentralization, ensuring up-to-date military defense, and an emphasis on protecting Denmark's national history and traditions. In foreign policy, the party supports economic cooperation with the European Union to aid Denmark's economic growth and keep peace in Europe, but maintains the EU must also respect the right to national identity and calls for a less centralized EU in which member states can maintain sovereignty over their national, regional and local decision making powers. The party also highlights environmentalism as one of its core philosophies in accordance to green conservatism.

== List of leaders ==
=== Political leaders ===
John Christmas Møller	1928–1947
Ole Bjørn Kraft	1947–1955
Aksel Møller	1955–1958
Poul Sørensen	1958–1969
Poul Møller	1969–1971
Erik Ninn-Hansen	1971–1974
Poul Schlüter	1974–1993
Henning Dyremose	1993
Hans Engell	1993–1997
Per Stig Møller	1997–1998
Pia Christmas-Møller	1998–1999
Bendt Bendtsen	1999–2008
Lene Espersen	2008–2011
Lars Barfoed	2011–2014
Søren Pape Poulsen	2014–2024
Mona Juul	2024–present

=== Party chairmen ===
Emil Piper	1916–1928
Charles Tvede	1928–1932
John Christmas Møller	1932–1939
Vilhelm Fibiger	1939–1948
Halfdan Hendriksen	1948–1957
Einar Foss	1957–1965
Knud Thestrup	1965–1972
Erik Haunstrup Clemmensen	1972–1974
Poul Schlüter	1974–1977
Ib Stetter	1977–1981
Poul Schlüter	1981–1993
Torben Rechendorff	1993–1995
Hans Engell	1995–1997
Per Stig Møller	1997–1998
Poul Andreassen	1998–2000
Bendt Bendtsen	2000–2008
Lene Espersen	2008–2011
Lars Barfoed	2011–2014
Søren Pape Poulsen	2014–2024
Mona Juul	2024–present

== Notable members ==
- John Christmas Møller – World War II resistance figure in exile in England.
- Poul Schlüter – The longest-serving Danish prime minister since Thorvald Stauning. Schlüter is the Conservative People's Party's only prime minister to date. He led the Conservative People's Party to its best-ever result at a national election, reaching 23.4% of the national vote. After his term as prime minister ended he was elected to the European Parliament in 1994, reaching a record breaking number of 247,956 personal votes.
- Connie Hedegaard – Appointed as the European Union's first ever European Commissioner for Climate Action in February 2010, Hedegaard was elected to the Danish Parliament as a member for the Conservative People's Party in 1984 at the age of 23, becoming the youngest Danish MP ever at that time. In 1989, Hedegaard became first spokesperson for the Conservative People's Party, but left politics for journalism in 1990.
- Stefan G. Rasmussen (born 23 July 1947), a former Danish pilot who captained the crash-landing SAS flight 751 on 27 December 1991, in which there were no fatalities. He then entered politics, serving in the Danish Folketing from 1994 to 1996.

== Election results ==
=== Parliament ===
Election	Votes	%	Seats	+/-	Government
1918	167,865	18.3 (#4)	22 / 140	▲14 (Note: Compared to Højre in the 1915 election)	Opposition
1920 (Apr)	201,499	19.6 (#3)	28 / 140	▲6	Caretaker government
1920 (Jul)	180,293	18.9 (#3)	26 / 140	▼2	External support
Sep 1920	216,733	17.9 (#3)	27 / 149	▲1	External support
1924	242,955	18.9 (#3)	28 / 149	▲1	Opposition
1926	275,793	20.6 (#3)	30 / 149	▲2	External support
1929	233,935	16.5 (#3)	24 / 149	▼6	Opposition
1932	358,509	17.3 (#3)	27 / 149	▲3	Opposition
1935	293,393	17.8 (#2)	26 / 149	▼1	Opposition
1939	301,625	17.8 (#3)	26 / 149	Steady	Opposition (1939–1940)
1939	301,625	17.8 (#3)	26 / 149	Steady	Coalition (1940–1943)
1943	421,523	21.0 (#2)	31 / 149	▲5	Coalition
1945	373,688	18.2 (#3)	26 / 149	▼5	External support
1947	259,324	12.4 (#3)	17 / 150	▼9	Opposition
1950	365,236	17.8 (#3)	27 / 151	▲10	Coalition
1953 (Apr)	358,509	17.3 (#3)	26 / 151	▼1	Coalition
1953 (Sep)	383,843	16.6 (#3)	30 / 179	▲4	Opposition
1957	383,843	16.6 (#3)	30 / 179	Steady	Opposition
1960	435,764	17.9 (#3)	32 / 179	▲2	Opposition
1964	527,798	20.1 (#3)	36 / 179	▲4	Opposition
1966	522,028	18.7 (#3)	34 / 179	▼2	Opposition
1968	581,051	20.4 (#2)	37 / 179	▲3	Coalition
1971	481,335	16.7 (#2)	31 / 179	▼6	Opposition
1973	279,391	9.2 (#5)	16 / 179	▼15	External support
1975	168,164	5.5 (#5)	10 / 179	▼6	Opposition
1977	263,262	8.5 (#4)	15 / 179	▲5	Opposition
1979	395,653	12.5 (#3)	22 / 179	▲7	Opposition
1981	451,478	14.5 (#2)	26 / 179	▲4	Opposition (1981–1982)
1981	451,478	14.5 (#2)	26 / 179	▲4	Coalition (1982–1984)
1984	788,224	23.4 (#2)	42 / 179	▲16	Coalition
1987	700,886	20.8 (#2)	38 / 179	▼4	Coalition
1988	642,048	19.3 (#2)	35 / 179	▼3	Coalition
1990	517,293	16.0 (#2)	30 / 179	▼5	Coalition (1990–1993)
1990	517,293	16.0 (#2)	30 / 179	▼5	Opposition (1993–1994)
1994	499,845	15.0 (#3)	27 / 179	▼3	Opposition
1998	303,965	8.9 (#3)	16 / 179	▼11	Opposition
2001	312,770	9.1 (#4)	16 / 179	Steady	Coalition
2005	344,886	10.3 (#4)	18 / 179	▲2	Coalition
2007	359,404	10.4 (#5)	18 / 179	Steady	Coalition
2011	175,047	4.9 (#8)	8 / 179	▼10	Opposition
2015	118,015	3.4 (#9)	6 / 179	▼2	External support (2015–2016)
2015	118,015	3.4 (#9)	6 / 179	▼2	Coalition (2016–2019)
2019	233,349	6.6 (#7)	12 / 179	▲6	Opposition
2022	194,820	5.5 (#7)	10 / 179	▼2	Opposition
2026	270,749	7.6 (#7)	13 / 179	▲3	Opposition

=== Local elections ===
Municipal elections

Year	Seats	
Year	No.	±
1925	332 / 11,289	
1929	626 / 11,329	▲294
1933	543 / 11,424	▼83
1937	602 / 11,425	▲59
1943	724 / 10,569	▲122
1946	592 / 11,488	▼132
1950	647 / 11,499	▲55
1954	609 / 11,505	▼38
1958	603 / 11,529	▼6
1962	707 / 11,414	▲104
1966	842 / 10,005	▲135
Municipal reform
1970	650 / 4,677	▼192
1974	439 / 4,735	▼211
1978	508 / 4,759	▲69
1981	640 / 4,769	▲132
1985	824 / 4,773	▲184
1989	602 / 4,737	▼222
1993	493 / 4,703	▼109
1997	481 / 4,685	▼12
2001	444 / 4,647	▼37
Municipal reform
2005	257 / 2,522	▼187
2009	262 / 2,468	▲5
2013	205 / 2,444	▼57
2017	225 / 2,432	▲20
2021	403 / 2,436	▲178
2025	343 / 2,436	▼60

Regional elections

Year	Seats	
Year	No.	±
1935	40 / 299	
1943	36 / 299	▼4
1946	31 / 299	▼5
1950	37 / 299	▲6
1954	36 / 299	▼1
1958	39 / 303	▲3
1962	47 / 301	▲8
1966	59 / 303	▲12
Municipal reform
1970	72 / 366	▲13
1974	45 / 370	▼27
1978	52 / 370	▲7
1981	60 / 370	▲8
1985	77 / 374	▲17
1989	53 / 374	▼24
1993	44 / 374	▼9
1997	40 / 374	▼4
2001	35 / 374	▼5
Municipal reform
2005	20 / 205	▼15
2009	20 / 205	0
2013	15 / 205	▼5
2017	15 / 205	0
2021	31 / 205	▲16

Mayors

Year	Seats	
Year	No.	±
2005	11 / 98	
2009	12 / 98	▲1
2013	13 / 98	▲1
2017	8 / 98	▼5
2021	14 / 98	▲6

=== European Parliament ===
Year	List leader	Votes	%	Seats	+/–	EP Group
1979	Poul Møller	245,309	14.06 (#4)	2 / 15	▲2	ED
1984	Poul Møller	414,177	20.81 (#1)	4 / 15	▲2	ED
1989	Marie Jepsen	238,760	13.34 (#4)	2 / 16	▼2	ED
1994	Poul Schlüter	368,890	17.74 (#2)	3 / 16	▲1	EPP
1999	Christian Rovsing	166,884	8.47 (#5)	1 / 16	▼2	EPP-ED
2004	Gitte Seeberg	214,972	11.35 (#3)	1 / 14	0	EPP-ED
2009	Bendt Bendtsen	297,199	12.69 (#5)	1 / 13	0	EPP
2014	Bendt Bendtsen	208,262	9.15 (#5)	1 / 13	0	EPP
2019	Pernille Weiss	170,544	6.18 (#6)	1 / 14	0	EPP
2024	Niels Flemming Hansen	216,357	8.84 (#4)	1 / 15	0	EPP
