= North Jutland County =

Former county of Denmark (1970–2006)

Coordinates: 57°02′52″N 9°55′07″E

North Jutland County Nordjyllands Amt (Danish)
- County of Denmark
- Coat of arms

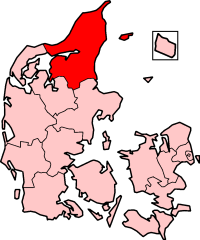
- North Jutland County in Denmark
- Seat: Aalborg

Area
  - Total: 6,173 km^{2} (2,383 sq mi)

Population (2006)
  - Total: 495,090
  - Density: 80.20/km^{2} (207.7/sq mi)

North Jutland County (Danish: Nordjyllands Amt) is a former county (Danish: amt) in northern Denmark. It was located on the eastern half of Vendsyssel-Thy and the northernmost part of the Jutland peninsula. It was the largest county in Denmark, but with a relatively low population. The county seat was Aalborg, Denmark's fourth largest city. The county was abolished effective January 1, 2007, when it merged into North Denmark Region (Danish: Region Nordjylland).

== Municipalities (1970-2006) ==
- Arden
- Brovst
- Brønderslev
- Dronninglund
- Farsø
- Fjerritslev
- Frederikshavn
- Hadsund
- Hals
- Hirtshals
- Hjørring
- Hobro
- Læsø
- Løgstør
- Løkken-Vrå
- Nibe
- Nørager
- Pandrup
- Sejlflod
- Sindal
- Skagen
- Skørping
- Støvring
- Sæby
- Aabybro
- Aalborg
- Aars

== See also ==
- Vendsyssel
- North Denmark Region
- Northern Jutland
