= 1997 Danish local elections =

Local elections were held in Denmark on 18 November 1997. 4685 municipal council members were elected to the 1998–2001 term of office in the 275 municipalities, as well as members of the 14 counties of Denmark.

== Results of regional elections ==
The results of the regional elections:

== County Councils ==
Ministry of interior informed that voter turnout was 71.4%.

Party	Seats
Social Democrats (Socialdemokraterne) (A)	136
Liberals (Venstre) (V)	124
Conservative People's Party (Det Konservative Folkeparti) (C)	40
Socialist People's Party (Socialistisk Folkeparti) (F)	25
Danish People's Party (Dansk Folkeparti) (O)	21
Social Liberal Party (Det Radikale Venstre) (B)	15
Progress Party (Fremskridtspartiet) (Z)	3
Christian Democrats (Kristeligt Folkeparti) (Q)	2
Red-Green Alliance (Enhedslisten) (Ø)	2
Schleswig Party (Slesvigsk Parti) (S)	1
Others	5
Total	374

== Municipal Councils ==
Ministry of interior informed that voter turnout was 70.1%.

Party	Seats
Social Democrats (Socialdemokraterne) (A)	1648
Liberals (Venstre) (V)	1557
Conservative People's Party (Det Konservative Folkeparti) (C)	481
Socialist People's Party (Socialistisk Folkeparti) (F)	233
Danish People's Party (Dansk Folkeparti) (O)	119
Social Liberal Party (Det Radikale Venstre) (B)	87
Progress Party (Fremskridtspartiet) (Z)	44
Christian Democrats (Kristeligt Folkeparti) (Q)	30
Red-Green Alliance (Enhedslisten) (Ø)	14
Schleswig Party (Slesvigsk Parti) (S)	8
Others	464
Total	4685
