= 1970 Danish local elections =

Regional elections were held in Denmark on 3 March 1970. 4677 municipal council members were elected to the 1970 - 1974 term of office in the 277 municipalities, as well as 366 members of the 14 counties of Denmark. The term of office was 1 April 1970 - 31 March 1974. In Copenhagen County Sengeløse was created a municipality from 1 April 1970, but existed only until 31 March 1974. It was abolished 1 April 1974, becoming part of Høje-Taastrup Municipality. Store Magleby parish municipality merged with Dragør parish municipality to become Dragør Municipality from 1 April 1974. From 1 April 1974 there were 275 municipalities in Denmark.

== Results of regional elections ==
The results of the regional elections:

=== County Councils ===
Party	Seats
Social Democrats (Socialdemokraterne) (A)	162
Liberals (Venstre) (D)	95
Conservative People's Party (Det Konservative Folkeparti) (C)	72
Social Liberal Party (Det Radikale Venstre) (B)	35
Socialist People's Party (Socialistisk Folkeparti) (F)	1
Schleswig Party (Slesvigsk Parti) (S)	1
Others	0
Total	366

=== Municipal Councils ===
Party	Seats
Social Democrats (Socialdemokraterne) (A)	1769
Liberals (Venstre) (D)	1080
Conservative People's Party (Det Konservative Folkeparti) (C)	650
Social Liberal Party (Det Radikale Venstre) (B)	323
Socialist People's Party (Socialistisk Folkeparti) (F)	27
Schleswig Party (Slesvigsk Parti) (S)	20
Communist Party (Kommunistiske Parti) (K)	4
Justice Party of Denmark (Retsforbundet) (E)	1
Left Socialists (Venstresocialisterne) (Y)	1
Others	802
Total	4677
