= 1985 Danish local elections =

Local elections were held in Denmark on 19 November 1985. 4773 municipal council members were elected to the 1986–1989 term of office in the 275 municipalities, as well as members of the 14 counties of Denmark.

== Results of regional elections ==
The results of the regional elections:

=== County Councils ===
Party	Seats
Social Democrats (Socialdemokraterne) (A)	143
Liberals (Venstre) (V)	83
Conservative People's Party (Det Konservative Folkeparti) (C)	77
Socialist People's Party (Socialistisk Folkeparti) (F)	40
Social Liberal Party (Det Radikale Venstre) (B)	13
The Greens (De Grønne) (G)	6
Christian Democrats (Kristeligt Folkeparti) (Q)	6
Progress Party (Fremskridtspartiet) (Z)	2
Left Socialists (Venstresocialisterne) (Y)	2
Centre Democrats (Centrum-Demokraterne) (M)	1
Schleswig Party (Slesvigsk Parti) (S)	1
Others	0
Total	374

=== Municipal Councils ===
Party	Seats
Social Democrats (Socialdemokraterne) (A)	1722
Liberals (Venstre) (V)	1201
Conservative People's Party (Det Konservative Folkeparti) (C)	824
Socialist People's Party (Socialistisk Folkeparti) (F)	320
Social Liberal Party (Det Radikale Venstre) (B)	108
Christian Democrats (Kristeligt Folkeparti) (Q)	33
Progress Party (Fremskridtspartiet) (Z)	30
Left Socialists (Venstresocialisterne) (Y)	15
Schleswig Party (Slesvigsk Parti) (S)	14
The Greens (De Grønne) (G)	11
Communist Party (Kommunistiske Parti) (K)	7
Others	488
Total	4773
