= 1974 Danish local elections =

Regional elections were held in Denmark on 5 March 1974. 4735 municipal council members were elected to the 1974–1978 term of office in the 275 municipalities, as well as 370 members of the 14 counties of Denmark. The term of office was 1 April 1974 to 31 March 1978. This followed the financial year in the public sector. From 1 January 1979 the financial year in the public sector became the same as the calendar year, 1 January to 31 December.

== Results of regional elections ==
The results of the regional elections:

=== County Councils ===
Party	Seats
Social Democrats (Socialdemokraterne) (A)	135
Liberals (Venstre) (V)	98
Conservative People's Party (Det Konservative Folkeparti) (C)	45
Social Liberal Party (Det Radikale Venstre) (B)	34
Progress Party (Fremskridtspartiet) (Z)	29
Socialist People's Party (Socialistisk Folkeparti) (F)	9
Christian Democrats (Kristeligt Folkeparti) (Q)	9
Communist Party (Kommunistiske Parti) (K)	7
Centre Democrats (Centrum-Demokraterne) (M)	2
Schleswig Party (Slesvigsk Parti) (S)	2
Others	0
Total	370

=== Municipal Councils ===
Party	Seats
Social Democrats (Socialdemokraterne) (A)	1532
Liberals (Venstre) (V)	1277
Conservative People's Party (Det Konservative Folkeparti) (C)	439
Social Liberal Party (Det Radikale Venstre) (B)	311
Progress Party (Fremskridtspartiet) (Z)	297
Socialist People's Party (Socialistisk Folkeparti) (F)	78
Communist Party (Kommunistiske Parti) (K)	46
Christian Democrats (Kristeligt Folkeparti) (Q)	37
Centre Democrats (Centrum-Demokraterne) (M)	24
Schleswig Party (Slesvigsk Parti) (S)	16
Left Socialists (Venstresocialisterne) (Y)	4
Justice Party of Denmark (Retsforbundet) (E)	3
Others	671
Total	4735
