= 1978 Danish local elections =

Local elections were held in Denmark on 7 March 1978. 4759 municipal council members were elected to the 1 April 1978 – 31 December 1981 term of office in the 275 municipalities, as well as members of the 14 counties of Denmark. The municipal and county councils began their term of office 1 April 1978 and it ended 31 December 1981. This was the last election that followed the old financial year 1 April – 31 March in the public sector. From 1 January 1979 the financial year in the public sector followed the calendar year 1 January – 31 December.

== Results of regional elections ==
The results of the regional elections:

=== County Councils ===
Party	Seats
Social Democrats (Socialdemokraterne) (A)	144
Liberals (Venstre) (V)	90
Conservative People's Party (Det Konservative Folkeparti) (C)	52
Progress Party (Fremskridtspartiet) (Z)	30
Social Liberal Party (Det Radikale Venstre) (B)	23
Socialist People's Party (Socialistisk Folkeparti) (F)	12
Communist Party (Kommunistiske Parti) (K)	7
Christian Democrats (Kristeligt Folkeparti) (Q)	5
Left Socialists (Venstresocialisterne) (Y)	3
Justice Party of Denmark (Retsforbundet) (E)	2
Centre Democrats (Centrum-Demokraterne) (M)	1
Schleswig Party (Slesvigsk Parti) (S)	1
Others	0
Total	370

=== Municipal Councils ===
Party	Seats
Social Democrats (Socialdemokraterne) (A)	1704
Liberals (Venstre) (V)	1155
Conservative People's Party (Det Konservative Folkeparti) (C)	508
Progress Party (Fremskridtspartiet) (Z)	348
Social Liberal Party (Det Radikale Venstre) (B)	192
Socialist People's Party (Socialistisk Folkeparti) (F)	80
Communist Party (Kommunistiske Parti) (K)	52
Christian Democrats (Kristeligt Folkeparti) (Q)	28
Left Socialists (Venstresocialisterne) (Y)	21
Schleswig Party (Slesvigsk Parti) (S)	14
Centre Democrats (Centrum-Demokraterne) (M)	13
Justice Party of Denmark (Retsforbundet) (E)	5
Others	639
Total	4759
