= 1981 Danish local elections =

Local elections were held in Denmark on 17 November 1981. 4769 municipal council members were elected to the 1982–1985 term of office in the 275 municipalities, as well as members of the 14 counties of Denmark.

== Results of regional elections ==
The results of the regional elections:

=== County Councils ===
Party	Seats
Social Democrats (Socialdemokraterne) (A)	140
Liberals (Venstre) (V)	84
Conservative People's Party (Det Konservative Folkeparti) (C)	60
Progress Party (Fremskridtspartiet) (Z)	25
Social Liberal Party (Det Radikale Venstre) (B)	24
Socialist People's Party (Socialistisk Folkeparti) (F)	24
Christian Democrats (Kristeligt Folkeparti) (Q)	6
Left Socialists (Venstresocialisterne) (Y)	3
Centre Democrats (Centrum-Demokraterne) (M)	2
Communist Party (Kommunistiske Parti) (K)	1
Schleswig Party (Slesvigsk Parti) (S)	1
Others	0
Total	370

=== Municipal Councils ===
Party	Seats
Social Democrats (Socialdemokraterne) (A)	1601
Liberals (Venstre) (V)	1240
Conservative People's Party (Det Konservative Folkeparti) (C)	640
Progress Party (Fremskridtspartiet) (Z)	279
Social Liberal Party (Det Radikale Venstre) (B)	187
Socialist People's Party (Socialistisk Folkeparti) (F)	155
Christian Democrats (Kristeligt Folkeparti) (Q)	27
Left Socialists (Venstresocialisterne) (Y)	27
Communist Party (Kommunistiske Parti) (K)	22
Schleswig Party (Slesvigsk Parti) (S)	12
Centre Democrats (Centrum-Demokraterne) (M)	8
Others	571
Total	4769
