= 2001 Danish local elections =

Elections in Denmark

Local elections were held in Denmark on 20 November 2001. 4,647 municipal council members were elected to 275 municipal councils, as well as members of 14 counties (Danish, Amtskommune, literally County Municipality) of Denmark. There were 14 counties and 275 municipalities, but the county of Bornholm was merged with its 5 constituent municipalities 1 January 2003 to form Bornholm Regional Municipality. The voters of Bornholm voted in these elections in the soon to be dissolved municipalities and county, but later elected the councillors in a local election 29 May 2002 to lead the newly formed municipality from January 2003. The county and county council of Bornholm just continued its work until 2002 while the new Bornholm Regional Municipality was being built from the 6 old entities. From 1 January 2003 until 31 December 2006, Bornholm was both a municipality and a county, thereafter becoming a part of Region Hovedstaden and losing most of its county privileges. These were the last local elections before the Strukturreformen.

Elections at the national level for the Folketing were held at the same time therefore resulting in an unusually high voter turnout.

== Results of regional elections ==
The results of the regional elections:

== County Councils ==
Ministry of interior informed that voter turnout was 86.0%. Elections to the Folketing were held at the same time therefore resulting in this unusually high voter turnout.

| Party | Seats |
|---|---|
| Liberals (Venstre) (V) | 139 |
| Social Democrats (Socialdemokraterne) (A) | 129 |
| Conservative People's Party (Det Konservative Folkeparti) (C) | 35 |
| Danish People's Party (Dansk Folkeparti) (O) | 24 |
| Socialist People's Party (Socialistisk Folkeparti) (F) | 23 |
| Social Liberal Party (Det Radikale Venstre) (B) | 15 |
| Christian Democrats (Kristeligt Folkeparti) (Q) | 4 |
| Red-Green Alliance (Enhedslisten) (Ø) | 2 |
| Schleswig Party (Slesvigsk Parti) (S) | 1 |
| Others | 2 |
| Total | 374 |

== Municipal Councils ==
Ministry of interior informed that voter turnout was 85.0%. Elections to the Folketing were also held resulting in an unusually high voter turnout.

| Party | Seats |
|---|---|
| Liberals (Venstre) (V) | 1666 |
| Social Democrats (Socialdemokraterne) (A) | 1551 |
| Conservative People's Party (Det Konservative Folkeparti) (C) | 444 |
| Socialist People's Party (Socialistisk Folkeparti) (F) | 237 |
| Danish People's Party (Dansk Folkeparti) (O) | 168 |
| Social Liberal Party (Det Radikale Venstre) (B) | 88 |
| Christian Democrats (Kristeligt Folkeparti) (Q) | 31 |
| Red-Green Alliance (Enhedslisten) (Ø) | 11 |
| Guldborgsundlisten (Guldborgsundlisten) (G) | 9 |
| Schleswig Party (Slesvigsk Parti) (S) | 7 |
| Others | 431 |
| Total | 4647 |
