= 1970 Danish Municipal Reform =

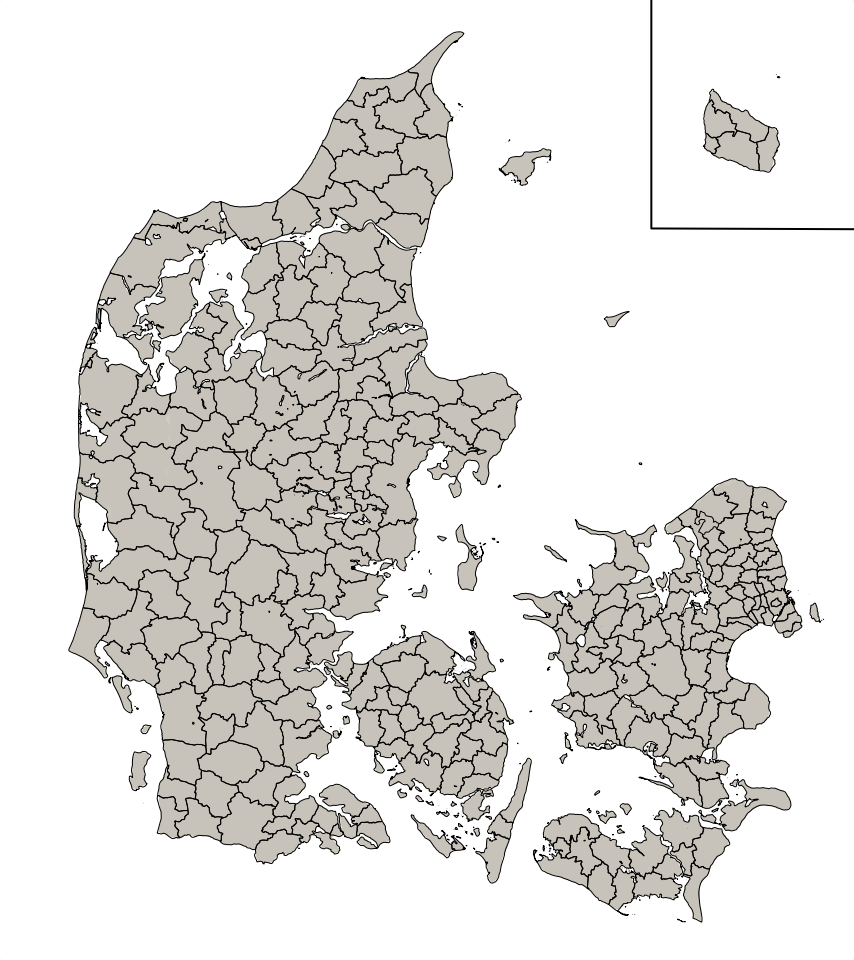
Map of the 275 municipalities after the changes.

The 1970 Danish Municipal Reform was an extensive administrative reform in Denmark which on 1 April 1970 reduced the number of Danish municipalities from 1,098 to 277 and the number of counties from 25 to 14. The reform also abolished the last legal privileges of the market towns (sing. Danish: købstad).

The 1970 reform was followed by another municipal reform in 2007, namely the Structural Reform. This reform would further reduce the number of municipalities in Denmark, and replace the counties with regions.

== History ==
In 1841, a law provided for the establishment of 1,021 parish municipalities (sing. Danish: sognekommune) for the first time, and their numbers increased over the years, as did the number of købstadskommuner (sing. Danish: købstadskommune). The parish municipalities belonged to 24 counties while the market towns were under direct control of the Ministry of the Interior. Originally the municipalities held only small areas of responsibility. During the 20th century, they were granted responsibility for the hospital service for the non-urban population.

In 1958, interior minister Søren Olesen (da) began what would eventually lead to the 1970 Municipal Reform. The number of municipalities peaked in 1965 at 1,345: there were 1,257 parish and 88 market town municipalities, with Copenhagen and Frederiksberg included in the latter total. At the time of the reform the number of municipalities had already been reduced to 1,098.

== Scope ==
Throughout the 16 years of gradually cutting the number of municipalities, they were reduced from well over 1,000 to 275. The number of counties was reduced from 25 to 14. The concept of market towns was abandoned, with Copenhagen and Frederiksberg being the only municipalities not part of a county after the reform.

=== 1974 adjustment ===
The last bits of the reform were not fully implemented until 1 April 1974 when the number of municipalities was further reduced to 275.

- Store Magleby and Dragør parishes were merged to become Dragør Municipality
- Sengeløse Municipality was merged into Høje-Taastrup Municipality

== See also ==
- 1970 in Denmark
- List of municipalities of Denmark (1970–2006)
