= 2025 Jammerbugt municipal election =

Municipal election in Denmark

← 2021	18 November 2025	2029 →

All 27 seats to the Jammerbugt municipal council 14 seats needed for a majority
- Turnout: 22,240 (73.1%) ▲0.7%
	First party	Second party	Third party
	V	A	C
Party	Venstre	Social Democrats	Conservatives
Last election	13 seats, 46.0%	8 seats, 28.6%	2 seats, 5.6%
Seats won	10	7	4
Seat change	▼3	▼1	▲2
Popular vote	7,122	5,518	2,865
Percentage	32.5%	25.1%	13.1%
Swing	▼13.5%	▼3.4%	▲7.5%
	Fourth party	Fifth party	Sixth party
	Æ	F	I
Party	Denmark Democrats	Green Left	Liberal Alliance
Last election	Did not stand	1 seat, 2.9%	Did not stand
Seats won	2	2	1
Seat change	▲2	▲1	▲1
Popular vote	1,866	1,436	1,064
Percentage	8.5%	6.5%	4.8%
Swing	New	▲3.7%	New
	Seventh party	Eighth party
	O	T
Party	Danish People's Party	Lokallisten Jammerbugt
Last election	1 seat, 3.5%	1 seat, 5.3%
Seats won	1	0
Seat change	0	▼1
Popular vote	1,051	252
Percentage	4.8%	1.1%
Swing	▲1.3%	▼4.1%
Mayor before election
Mogens Christen Gade
Venstre
Mayor after election
Christian Hem
Venstre

The 2025 Jammerbugt Municipal election was held on November 18, 2025, to elect the 27 members to sit in the regional council for the Jammerbugt Municipal council, in the period of 2026 to 2029. Christian Hem, the new candidate from Venstre, would secure the mayoral position.

== Background ==
Following the 2021 election, Mogens Christen Gade from Venstre won his fifth consecutive term as mayor of Jammerbugt Municipality. However, prior to this election, it was revealed that Christen Gade would only seek re-election as a council member, and not continue as mayor. It was later revealed that Venstre would put Christian Hem forward as their mayoral candidate.

== Electoral system ==
For elections to Danish municipalities, a number varying from 9 to 31 are chosen to be elected to the municipal council. The seats are then allocated using the D'Hondt method and a closed list proportional representation. Jammerbugt Municipality had 27 seats in 2025.

Unlike in Danish General Elections, in elections to municipal councils, electoral alliances are allowed.

== Electoral alliances ==
=== Electoral Alliance 1 ===
Party		Political alignment
A	Social Democrats	Centre-left
F	Green Left	Centre-left to Left-wing

=== Electoral Alliance 2 ===
Party		Political alignment
B	Social Liberals	Centre to Centre-left
K	Christian Democrats	Centre to Centre-right
T	Lokallisten Jammerbugt	Local politics

=== Electoral Alliance 3 ===
Party		Political alignment
C	Conservatives	Centre-right
I	Liberal Alliance	Centre-right to Right-wing
L	Vendelbo-Listen	Local politics

=== Electoral Alliance 4 ===
Party		Political alignment
O	Danish People's Party	Right-wing to Far-right
V	Venstre	Centre-right
Æ	Denmark Democrats	Right-wing to Far-right

== Results by polling station ==
Division	A	B	C	F	I	K	L	O	P	T	V	Æ
Division	%	%	%	%	%	%	%	%	%	%	%	%
Aabybro	28.9	0.8	24.3	6.3	8.8	0.5	0.9	3.3	0.0	0.4	20.2	5.4
Biersted	56.5	0.4	7.0	6.0	5.3	0.5	1.4	2.3	0.0	0.4	10.2	10.1
Nørhalne	21.7	1.4	4.6	6.1	4.0	0.7	0.4	4.1	0.0	0.2	50.1	6.8
Vedsted	24.4	0.8	11.2	4.5	2.8	0.3	1.3	2.7	0.0	0.4	43.2	8.5
Gjøl	24.9	0.9	9.9	4.1	1.9	0.0	1.0	1.8	0.1	0.1	51.8	3.6
Ingstrup	23.7	1.4	11.1	7.8	3.9	0.0	2.8	3.1	0.0	0.8	29.5	15.9
V. Hjermitslev	44.3	1.0	9.5	5.2	3.3	0.0	2.3	6.6	0.0	0.0	13.8	14.1
Brovst	20.9	0.9	8.8	4.8	2.6	1.1	1.2	7.5	0.1	0.9	44.4	7.0
Halvrimmen	17.7	1.1	10.1	6.0	4.8	0.8	1.7	5.5	0.0	1.1	40.2	11.2
Arentsminde	19.1	1.2	12.0	6.5	4.3	0.3	4.0	4.3	0.0	2.2	35.5	10.5
Tranum	22.3	1.3	8.7	8.8	3.0	0.7	1.9	5.1	0.0	3.1	37.7	7.2
Skovsgård	21.2	0.5	5.6	8.5	3.2	0.2	0.9	10.9	0.0	1.3	35.8	11.9
Fjerritslev	17.7	0.5	6.4	8.7	3.7	1.6	0.6	3.7	0.0	2.2	47.0	8.0
Thorup	7.4	0.3	2.6	8.6	1.5	0.9	0.3	3.7	0.2	1.5	62.5	10.3
Ørebro	9.2	0.6	6.6	6.2	4.9	1.5	0.9	2.4	0.2	3.9	50.8	12.8
Trekroner Landsbycenter	8.8	0.5	4.4	6.5	3.6	2.8	2.6	3.6	0.0	1.1	55.6	10.7
Jetsmark	33.0	0.9	10.7	6.7	5.2	0.3	5.7	7.4	0.0	1.1	18.2	10.8
Hune	19.4	1.0	31.1	6.0	6.1	0.6	1.7	5.5	0.0	0.6	21.8	6.2
Saltum	22.3	0.8	26.7	5.8	2.8	0.1	3.6	3.7	0.0	3.7	20.6	9.8

== Results ==
Party		Votes	%	+/-	Seats	+/-
Jammerbugt Municipality
V	Venstre	7,122	32.46	-13.55	10	-3
A	Social Democrats	5,518	25.15	-3.41	7	-1
C	Conservatives	2,865	13.06	+7.48	4	+2
Æ	Denmark Democrats	1,866	8.50	New	2	New
F	Green Left	1,436	6.54	+3.68	2	+1
I	Liberal Alliance	1,064	4.85	New	1	New
O	Danish People's Party	1,051	4.79	+1.31	1	0
L	Vendelbo-Listen	430	1.96	New	0	New
T	Lokallisten Jammerbugt	252	1.15	-4.12	0	-1
B	Social Liberals	182	0.83	+0.15	0	0
K	Christian Democrats	152	0.69	-0.27	0	0
P	Det Liberale Højre	6	0.03	New	0	New
Total		21,944	100	N/A	27	N/A
Invalid votes		46	0.15	-0.12		
Blank votes		250	0.82	+0.27		
Turnout		22,240	73.12	+0.75		
Source: valg.dk

== Opinion polls ==
Polling firm	Fieldwork date	Sample size	V	A	C	T	O	F	K	B	I	L	P	Æ	Others	Lead
Epinion	4 Sep - 13 Oct 2025	485	27.2	29.4	6.1	–	5.4	5.4	–	1.5	8.3	–	–	15.5	1.2	2.2
2024 european parliament election	9 Jun 2024		19.3	19.5	5.5	–	7.2	10.4	–	3.3	6.0	–	–	19.9	–	0.4
2022 general election	1 Nov 2022		15.5	35.5	3.4	–	2.3	4.1	0.7	1.1	5.8	–	–	18.5	–	17.0
2021 regional election	16 Nov 2021		33.9	34.3	12.0	–	5.1	3.0	1.0	1.6	0.5	–	–	–	–	0.4
2021 municipal election	16 Nov 2021		46.0 (13)	28.6 (8)	5.6 (2)	5.3 (1)	3.5 (1)	2.9 (1)	1.0 (0)	0.7 (0)	–	–	–	–	–	17.4
