= 2021 Jammerbugt municipal election =

← 2017	16 November 2021	2025 →

All 27 seats to the Jammerbugt Municipal Council 14 seats needed for a majority
- Turnout: 21,954 (72.4%) ▼2.3pp
	First party	Second party	Third party
	V	A	C
Party	Venstre	Social Democrats	Conservatives
Last election	14 seats, 46.5%	9 seats, 27.1%	0 seats, 1.4%
Seats won	13	8	2
Seat change	▼1	▼1	▲2
Popular vote	9,984	6,198	1,211
Percentage	46.0%	28.6%	5.6%
Swing	▼0.5%	▲1.5%	▲4.2%
	Fourth party	Fifth party	Sixth party
	T	D	O
Party	Lokalisten Jammerbugt	New Right	Danish People's Party
Last election	1 seat, 3.2%	0 seats, 2.4%	2 seats, 9.3%
Seats won	1	1	1
Seat change	0	▲1	▼1
Popular vote	1,144	920	755
Percentage	5.3%	4.2%	3.5%
Swing	▲2.1%	▲1.8%	▼5.8%
	Seventh party
	F
Party	Green Left
Last election	1 seat, 3.8%
Seats won	1
Seat change	0
Popular vote	622
Percentage	2.9%
Swing	▼0.9%
Mayor before election
Mogens Christian Gade
Venstre
Mayor after election
Mogens Christian Gade
Venstre

Since its creation in the 2007 municipal reform, Mogens Christian Gade from Venstre had been mayor of Jammerbugt Municipality. In the previous election of 2017, Venstre won 14 and thereby a majority of seats for the first time. Venstre would lose a seat and lose their one-party majority in this election. However, Venstre still became the biggest party with 5 more seats than the Social Democrats, and on December 2, 2021, an agreement for a constitution between Social Democrats, Green Left, Danish People's Party and Venstre were announced. This would result in Mogens Christian Gade continuing as mayor.

== Electoral system ==
For elections to Danish municipalities, a number varying from 9 to 31 are chosen to be elected to the municipal council. The seats are then allocated using the D'Hondt method and a closed list proportional representation. Jammerbugt Municipality had 27 seats in 2021

Unlike in Danish General Elections, in elections to municipal councils, electoral alliances are allowed.

== Electoral alliances ==
=== Electoral Alliance 1 ===
Party		Political alignment
O	Danish People's Party	Right-wing to Far-right
V	Venstre	Centre-right

=== Electoral Alliance 2 ===
Party		Political alignment
B	Social Liberals	Centre to Centre-left
C	Conservatives	Centre-right
K	Christian Democrats	Centre to Centre-right
T	Lokalisten Jammerbugt	Local politics

=== Electoral Alliance 3 ===
Party		Political alignment
F	Green Left	Centre-left to Left-wing
Ø	Red–Green Alliance	Left-wing to Far-Left
Å	The Alternative	Centre-left to Left-wing

== Results by polling station ==
Polling Station	A	B	C	D	F	K	O	V	Ø	Å	T
Polling Station	%	%	%	%	%	%	%	%	%	%	%
Aabybro	28.7	0.7	5.8	2.6	2.6	0.8	1.9	53.1	1.3	0.5	1.9
Biersted	46.6	0.4	4.8	4.2	0.9	0.8	3.1	35.7	1.5	0.5	1.5
Nørhalne	30.7	0.1	2.6	2.2	2.2	1.0	2.4	56.1	1.0	0.2	1.4
Vedsted	19.3	0.1	4.8	1.4	3.2	0.3	2.1	64.3	1.4	0.8	2.2
Gjøl	34.0	0.7	9.6	2.4	2.1	0.5	2.0	46.2	2.0	0.4	0.1
Ingstrup	22.9	1.3	4.7	8.7	3.4	1.3	2.9	47.6	3.4	0.8	2.9
V. Hjermitslev	44.0	0.6	2.2	6.0	4.1	0.3	3.2	35.0	0.6	0.3	3.5
Brovst	25.7	0.5	7.6	2.7	1.4	0.9	3.7	53.4	1.9	0.2	1.9
Halvrimmen	24.4	0.5	7.3	3.8	1.7	0.5	4.7	51.5	2.7	0.0	2.9
Arentsminde	19.0	0.5	10.3	5.7	2.2	0.8	5.2	53.7	1.1	0.3	1.4
Tranum	23.8	0.6	10.4	4.4	4.2	1.1	1.9	39.5	4.0	0.8	9.3
Skovsgård	21.8	0.4	3.4	4.0	3.0	1.2	7.6	52.4	1.7	0.2	4.3
Fjerritslev	29.1	0.6	6.2	2.9	3.3	1.6	2.6	42.4	1.8	0.4	9.1
Thorup	21.9	0.5	5.4	4.3	5.7	2.1	2.7	43.3	2.5	0.0	11.7
Örebro	21.1	0.5	5.5	5.7	3.7	1.6	3.4	42.7	1.6	0.0	14.2
Trekroner	16.0	0.3	5.3	5.3	3.2	3.2	3.4	56.4	0.8	0.0	6.0
Pandrup	34.0	1.2	3.2	6.4	3.3	0.6	4.3	40.1	2.2	0.8	3.9
Kaas	36.0	0.3	3.0	10.5	3.3	0.6	6.8	31.7	3.2	1.1	3.7
Hune	23.7	1.5	7.3	4.2	3.0	0.2	3.3	34.9	2.0	0.4	19.6
Saltum	25.6	2.1	4.1	5.0	3.8	0.9	5.8	39.4	1.7	0.9	10.7

== Results ==
Party		Votes	%	+/-	Seats	+/-
Jammerbugt Municipality
V	Venstre	9,984	46.00	-0.49	13	-1
A	Social Democrats	6,198	28.56	+1.44	8	-1
C	Conservatives	1,211	5.58	+4.17	2	+2
T	Lokallisten Jammerbugt	1,144	5.27	New	1	New
D	New Right	920	4.24	+1.85	1	+1
O	Danish People's Party	755	3.48	-5.83	1	-1
F	Green Left	622	2.87	-0.93	1	0
Ø	Red-Green Alliance	409	1.88	-0.67	0	0
K	Christian Democrats	209	0.96	+0.41	0	0
B	Social Liberals	148	0.68	-0.29	0	0
Å	The Alternative	103	0.47	-1.11	0	0
Total		21,703	100	N/A	27	N/A
Invalid votes		83	0.27	+0.17		
Blank votes		168	0.55	-0.20		
Turnout		21,954	72.37	-2.54		
Source: valg.dk
