= Morten Klessen =

Danish politician (born 1969)

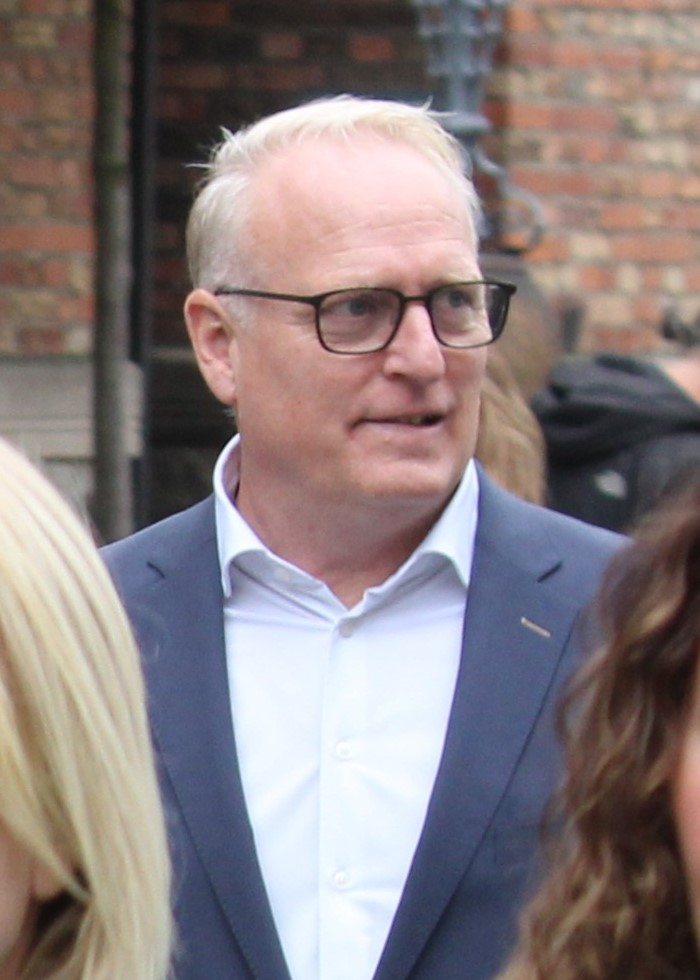
- Klessen in October 2025

Member of the Folketing
- In office 28 February 2025 – 24 March 2026
- Preceded by: Rasmus Prehn
- Constituency: North Jutland

Personal details
- Born: 9 April 1969 (age 57) Biersted, Denmark
- Party: Social Democrats
- Education: Aalborg Seminarium
- Occupation: Teacher

Morten Klessen (born 9 April 1969) is a Danish politician and former Member of the Folketing. A Social Democrat, he represented North Jutland from February 2025 to March 2026.

== Early life ==
Klessen was born on 9 April 1969 in Biersted. He is the son of head of section Kjeld Erik Klessen and shop assistant Inge Rosbech Klessen. He was educated at the Biersted skole (1976–1985) and Onsild idrætsefterskole (1985–1986). Klessen joined the Royal Danish Air Force at the age of 18, serving as a fireman at the Aalborg Air Base (1988–1994) and a non-commissioned officer in Air Squadron 650 (1994–1997) which was responsible for ground-based air defence.

After leaving the air force, Klessen trained as a teacher at Aalborg Seminarium from 1997 to 2001. Following graduation, Klessen and his wife sold their apartment in Aalborg and spent eight months travelling to Thailand, Hong Kong, New Zealand and Australia with their two children.

== Career ==
The family settled in Biersted on returning to Denmark. Klessen was a teacher in Brønderslev (2002–2015), commercial and sports manager for Fortuna Hjørring (2016–2017) and sports director for AaB A/S’ girl and women's section (2017-2019). He has been a teacher at the Ølandhus children's home since 2021.

=== Politics ===
Klessen was a member of the municipal council in Jammerbugt Municipality from 2005 to 2019. He contested the 2019 European election as a Social Democrat candidate in Denmark but was not elected, losing out to Niels Fuglsang by 5,439 votes. He contested the 2021 local election as a Social Democrat candidate in North Jutland Region but was not elected, losing out to Lis Mancini by four votes. He was however a member of the North Jutland Regional Council from 2024 to 2025, having replaced Ulla Astman.

Klessen contested the 2022 general election as a Social Democrat candidate in North Jutland but was not elected, losing out to Rasmus Prehn by 62 votes. He became a permanent member of the Folketing in February 2025 following Prehn's resignation. He was re-elected to Jammerbugt Municipal Council at the 2025 local election. He will not be contesting the 2026 general election.

== Personal life ==
Klessen is married to Susanne and has four children - Johanne, Mads-Emil, Katrine and Sille. He lives in Aabybro. He started coaching Biersted's first girls football team at the age of 18. Since then he has coached boys and girls teams in Pandrup (Jetsmark), Aabybro, Ulsted and Aalborg (B52 Aalborg).

== Electoral history ==
Electoral history of Morten Klessen
Election	Constituency	Party	Votes	Result
2009 local	Jammerbugt Municipality	Social Democrats	423	Elected
2009 local	Jammerbugt Municipality	Social Democrats	515	Elected
2013 local	Jammerbugt Municipality	Social Democrats	505	Elected
2017 local	Jammerbugt Municipality	Social Democrats	579	Elected
2019 European	Denmark	Social Democrats	24,005	Not elected
2021 local	North Jutland Region	Social Democrats	1,400	Not elected
2022 general	North Jutland	Social Democrats	1,837	Not elected
2025 local	Jammerbugt Municipality	Social Democrats	551	Elected
