= Osterby =

Osterby may refer to:

== People ==
- H.C. Østerby (born 1955), Danish politician

== Places ==
- Osterby, Rendsburg-Eckernförde, municipality in Rendsburg-Eckernförde district, Schleswig-Holstein, Germany
- Osterby, Schleswig-Flensburg, municipality in Schleswig-Flensburg district, Schleswig-Holstein, Germany
- Österby, village in Noarootsi Parish, Lääne County, Estonia
- Østerby, Denmark, village in Jammerbugt Municipality, Denmark

== Other uses ==
- Osterby Man (died 75 AD), bog body from Iron Age discovered in Germany

== See also ==
- Österbybruk, a locality situated in Östhammar Municipality, Uppsala County, Sweden
