= Birkelse =

- Village
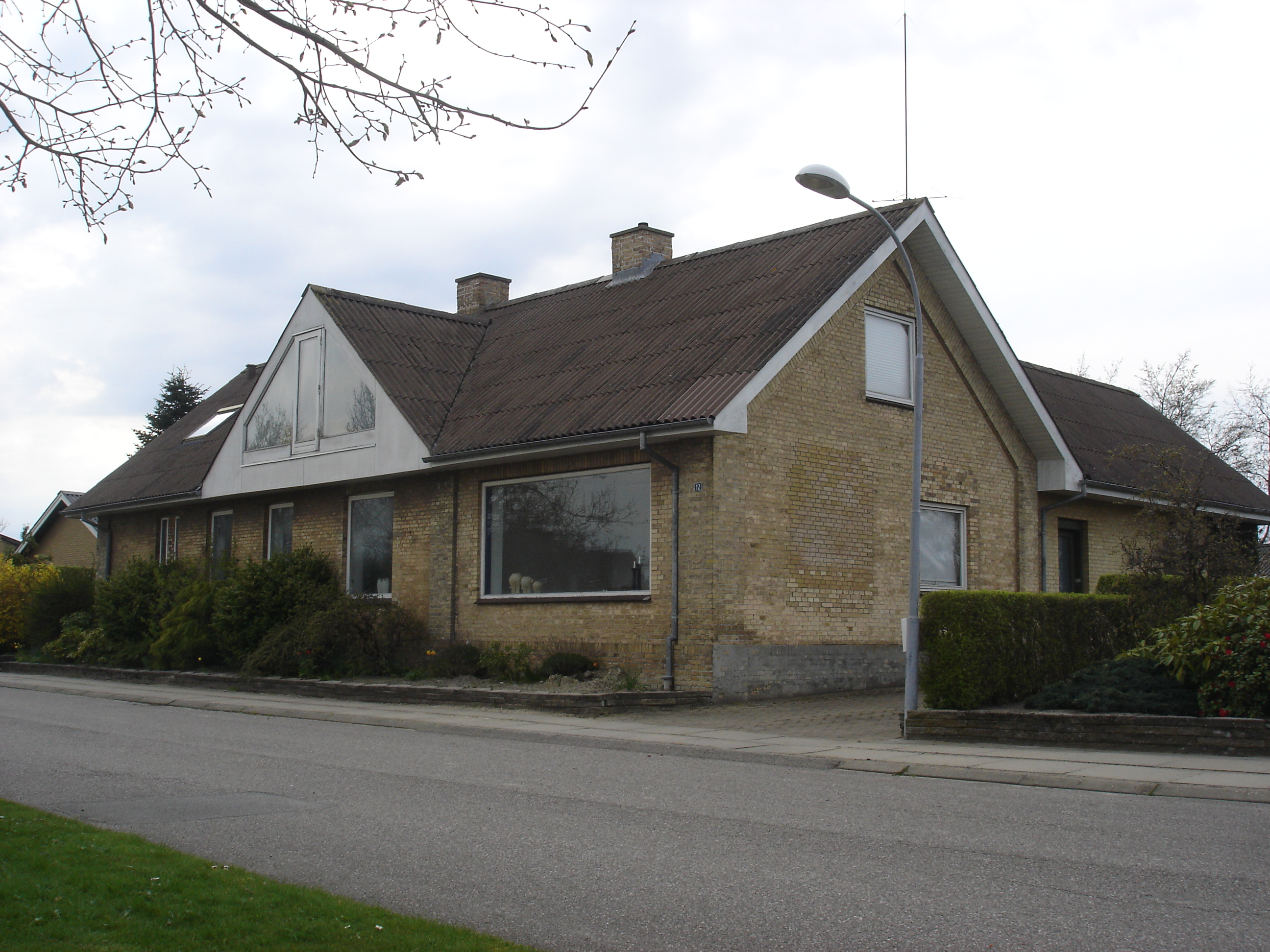
- The former Birkelse Station

- Location in the North Jutland Region
- Coordinates: 57°8′59″N 9°41′2″E
- Country: Denmark
- Region: North Jutland
- Municipality: Jammerbugt

Population (2026)
  - Total: 611
- Time zone: UTC+1 (CET)
  - Summer (DST): UTC+2 (CEST)

Birkelse is a village in North Jutland, Denmark. It is located in Jammerbugt Municipality. The town has nearly grown together with the nearby village of Ryå.

== History ==
A train station was located in Birkelse between 1897 and 1969. It was a stop on the Fjerritslev-Nørresundby railroad.

In 2017, the remains of a World War II Messerschmitt fighter plane were found in a field in Birkelse.
