= Vester Torup =

- Village
- Location in the North Jutland Region
- Coordinates: 57°6′12″N 9°7′29″E
- Country: Denmark
- Region: North Jutland
- Municipality: Jammerbugt

Population (2026)
  - Total: 235
- Time zone: UTC+1 (CET)
  - Summer (DST): UTC+2 (CEST)

Vester Torup is a village in North Jutland, Denmark. It is located in Jammerbugt Municipality.

== Notable residents ==
- Henriette Nielsen (1815 — 1900), author
