= Bonderup, Jammerbugt Municipality =

Bonderup
- Village
- Location in the North Jutland Region
- Coordinates: 57°3′47″N 9°22′17″E
- Country: Denmark
- Region: North Jutland
- Municipality: Jammerbugt

Population (2022)
  - Total: 203
- Time zone: UTC+1 (CET)
  - Summer (DST): UTC+2 (CEST)

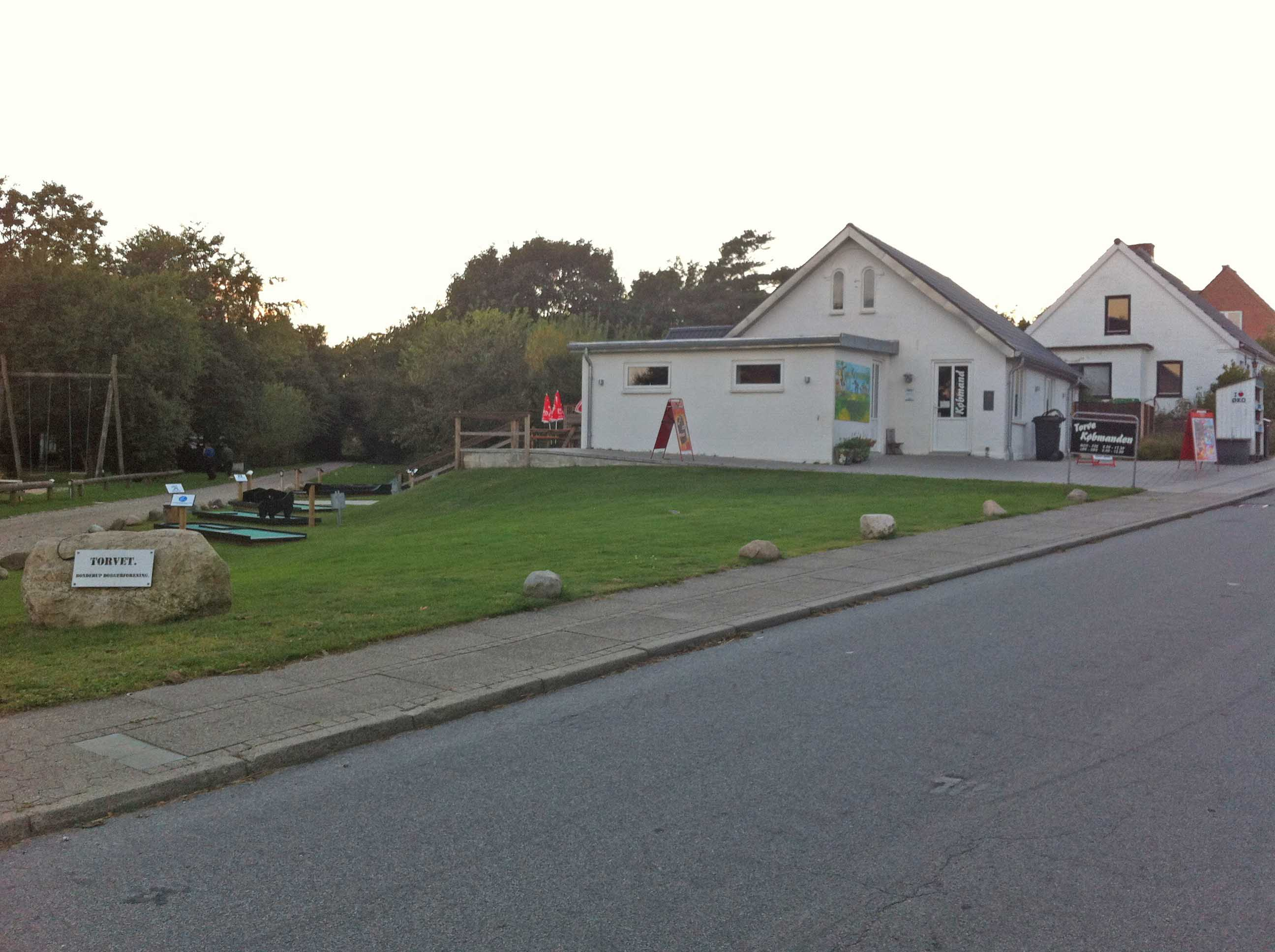
The square in Bonderup with the activity center that houses the market stall.

Bonderup is a village in North Jutland, Denmark. It is located in Jammerbugt Municipality.
