= Kirsten Kjær =

Danish painter (1893–1985)

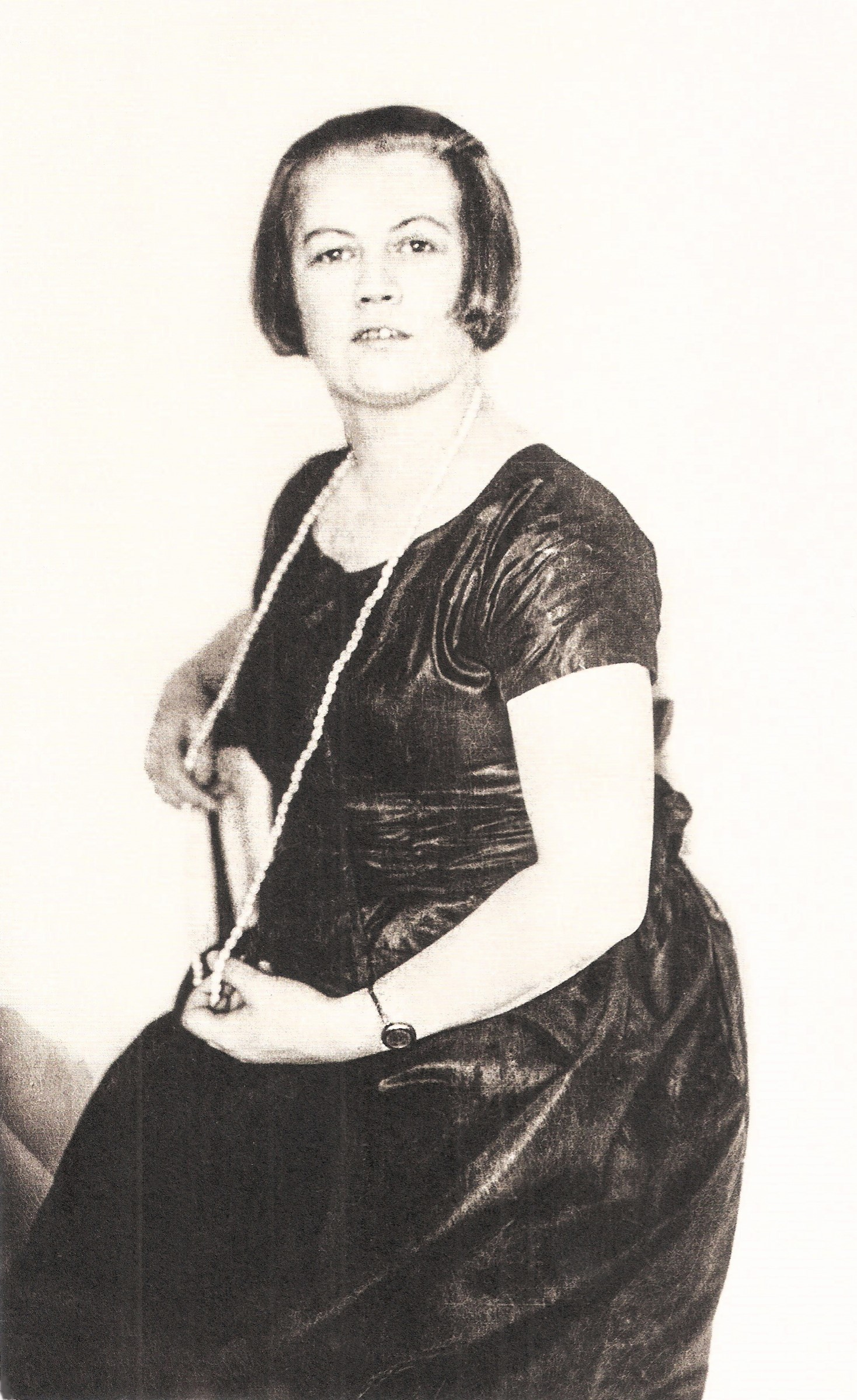
Kirsten Kjær in 1925

Maren Kirstine "Kirsten" Kjær (1893–1985) was a self-taught Danish painter from northern Jutland. After a rather confused early life, in 1925 she realized she wanted to paint and, inspired by Gauguin's works, made a trip to France. From 1926, she spent three successful years on the west coast of the United States, exhibiting in San Francisco and Oakland. On her return to Denmark, she visited Skagen where she met the Swedish writers Brita von Horn and Elsa Collin who introduced her to art circles in Stockholm. After World War II, she traveled widely, painting both portraits and landscapes in Poland, Lapland, Iceland, Tunisia and Liberia. Her colourful, expressive and increasingly decorative portraits depicted not only well-known figures of her times but also ordinary people she came across on her travels. Many of her paintings are exhibited in the Kirsten Kjærs Museum at Frøstup near Thisted in the north of Jutland.

== Biography ==
Born on 14 November 1893 in Vester Torup near Fjerritslev in the northwest of Jutland, Maren Kirstine Kjær was the daughter of the dairy operator Peder Kristian Kjær Andersen (born 1862) and his wife Nicoline Petrea née Hansen (1868–1937). She had no formal education in painting.

Not keen to spend her life as a rural housewife, she left home when she was 14 and worked in a nearby bakery. She later moved to Aalborg where she received a diploma in shopkeeping. During the First World War, she spent time in Germany where she volunteered unsuccessfully to act as a nurse for the German troops. After the war, she worked for an insurance company in Copenhagen and took piano lessons. She then returned to Aalborg where in August 1918, she married the artist Frode Nielsen Dann (1892–1984). The marriage was dissolved in 1934.

== Career as a painter ==
After a serious depression and an operation for tuberculosis in 1924, she recovered after staying with her parents in the country. On painting her first portrait in 1925, she realized she wanted to become a painter. Although she had no formal training in painting, she had become familiar with the artistic environment through her husband and his brother, the painter Jens Nielsen. Her first painting appears to have been a portrait of the architect Jeppe Jepsen in 1925. She also painted a portrait of her relative Jens Søndergaard who was himself an expressionist painter.

After discovering Gauguin at art exhibitions in Denmark, in 1926 she made a trip to France where she painted landscapes. Later that year, together with her husband she went to the United States where she stayed for the next three years. She painted the people she found in San Francisco's Chinatown and the lumberjacks she came across in Oregon, gaining recognition after exhibiting in San Francisco and Oakland.

Following separation from her husband, she returned to Denmark alone in 1929. She struck up a friendship with the author Karin Michaëlis who wrote a novel about her wild experiences in American titled Hjertets Vagabond (Vagabond of the Heart) in 1930. But Kjær certainly did not welcome the account.

In the early 1930s, she established a close relationship with the newspaper editor Anders Olsen, spending several years with him in Aarhus. While visiting Skagen with him in 1933, she met the Swedish writers Brita von Horn and Elsa Collin who invited them both to Stockholm where Kjær became acquainted with the Swedish art scene. Olsen introduced her to a number of politicians and performers in Denmark, some of whom became subjects for her portraits. She remained with Olsen until his death in 1938.

After the end of World War II, Kjær visited Poland, painting the picture Polske Blomster (Polish Flowers, 1047) depicting two young girls. She went on to make many trips to Lapland (1948–69) and Iceland (1955–57), painting expressive landscape scenes. Later she visited Tunisia and Liberia. Her friends and supporters created a foundation which in 1981 led to the establishment of the Kirsten Kjæers Museum in Frøstrup where many of her works can be seen.

Kirster Kjær continued to paint as she grew older. She started her last painting when she was 91 in the old people's home near the museum. She died in Frøstrup on 8 May 1985.
