= Jammerbugt Municipality =

Jammerbugt Municipality Jammerbugt Kommune (Danish)
- Municipality
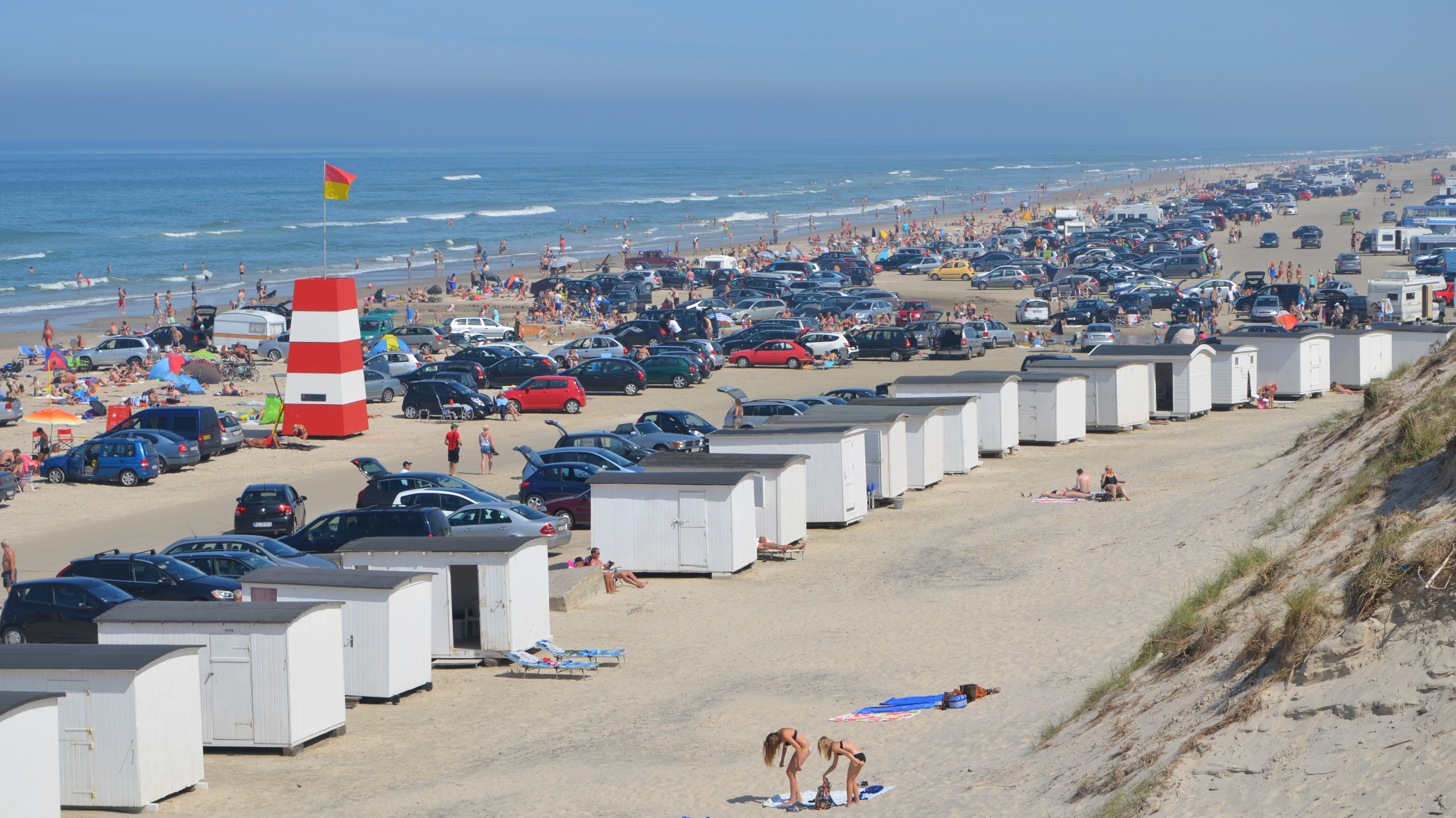
- Beach by Blokhus

- Coat of arms

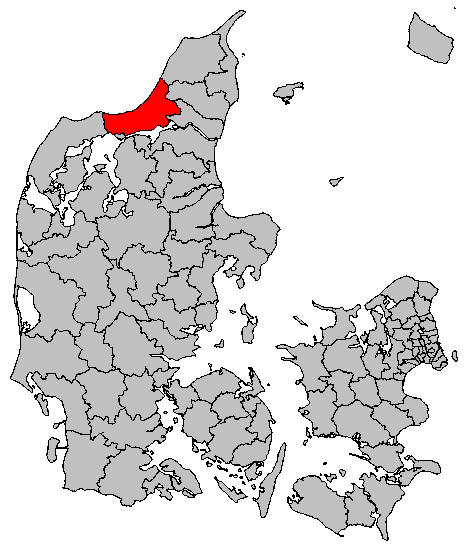
- Coordinates: 57°08′N 9°34′E
- Country: Denmark
- Region: North Jutland
- Established: 1 January 2007
- Seat: Aabybro

Government
  - Mayor: Mogens Christian Gade (V)

Area
  - Total: 866.25 km^{2} (334.46 sq mi)

Population (1 January 2026)
  - Total: 37,998
  - Density: 43.865/km^{2} (113.61/sq mi)
- Time zone: UTC1 (CET)
  - Summer (DST): UTC2 (CEST)
- Municipal code: 849
- Website: www.jammerbugt.dk

Jammerbugt Municipality (Danish: Jammerbugt Kommune) is a municipality (Danish: kommune) in the North Jutland Region on the North Jutlandic Island. It is located along the coast of Skagerrak to the north and the Limfjord to the south. It borders the municipalities of Thisted, Vesthimmerland, Aalborg, Brønderslev and Hjørring.

Jammerbugt Municipality was formed during the municipal reform of 2007, when the municipalities of Brovst Municipality, Fjerritslev Municipality, Pandrup Municipality and Aabybro Municipality were merged.

Since the municipality's foundation in 2007 the mayor has been Mogens Christian Gade of the Venstre party. Mogens Christian Gade was also the mayor of Brovst Municipality since 2002 and until it was dissolved in 2007.

The name of the region, the Jammerbugt, translating to the Bay of Woe, was originally given due to the numerous shipwrecks laid there.

The municipality include the uninhabited islands of Fruensholm and Troldholme.

== History ==
In the Middle Ages, Denmark was divided into syssels. The area that currently make up Jammerbugt Municipality was known as Han Hundred (Danish: Han Herred) and belonged to the syssel of Thysyssel. It later came under the fief of Aalborghus. In 1662 Han Hundred was merged with a number of hundreds and came under Åstrup, Sejlstrup, Børglum County. The county lasted until 1793. Vester Han Hundred, making up approximately half of the current Jammerbugt Municipality's borders, came under Thisted County, while Øster Han Hundred and Hvetbo Hundred, making up the other half, came under Hjørring County. These counties lasted until the 1970 Danish Municipal Reform where they came under the North Jutland County.

In 1842 Denmark was divided into smaller administrative divisions, namely parish municipalities (Danish: sognekommunner). The borders of these municipalities were largely based on the country's parishes. In the 1970 municipal reform these parish municipalities were dissolved. Three parish municipalities were merged to create Aabybro Municipality, three were merged to form Pandrup Municipality and seven were merged to form Fjerritslev Municipality. Five parish municipalities had been merged already in 1966 to form Brovst Parish Municipality. This parish municipality was changed to become Brovst Municipality in 1970.

=== Historical divisions ===
The table below shows the historical municipal subdivisions of Jammerbugt Municipality.

Historical municipal divisions of Jammerbugt Municipality
2007	1970	1966	1929	1842	Towns
Jammerbugt Mun.	Aabybro Mun.	Åby-Biersted Parish Mun.		Åby-Biersted Parish Mun.	Aabybro
Jammerbugt Mun.	Aabybro Mun.	Åby-Biersted Parish Mun.		Åby-Biersted Parish Mun.	Biersted
Jammerbugt Mun.	Aabybro Mun.	Åby-Biersted Parish Mun.		Åby-Biersted Parish Mun.	Nørhalne
Jammerbugt Mun.	Aabybro Mun.	Vedsted Parish Mun.		Åby-Biersted Parish Mun.	Birkelse
Jammerbugt Mun.	Aabybro Mun.	Gjøl Parish Mun.			Gjøl
Jammerbugt Mun.	Pandrup Mun.	Jetsmark Parish Mun.			Pandrup
Jammerbugt Mun.	Pandrup Mun.	Jetsmark Parish Mun.			Kås
Jammerbugt Mun.	Pandrup Mun.	Saltum-Hune Parish Mun.			Saltum
Jammerbugt Mun.	Pandrup Mun.	Saltum-Hune Parish Mun.			Hune
Jammerbugt Mun.	Pandrup Mun.	Saltum-Hune Parish Mun.			Blokhus
Jammerbugt Mun.	Pandrup Mun.	Ingstrup-Vester Hjermitslev-Alstrup Parish Mun.			Ingstrup
Jammerbugt Mun.	Pandrup Mun.	Ingstrup-Vester Hjermitslev-Alstrup Parish Mun.			Vester Hjermitslev
Jammerbugt Mun.	Brovst Mun.	Brovst Parish Mun.	Brovst Parish Mun.		Brovst
Jammerbugt Mun.	Brovst Mun.	Brovst Parish Mun.	Brovst Parish Mun.		Halvrimmen
Jammerbugt Mun.	Brovst Mun.	Brovst Parish Mun.	Brovst Parish Mun.		Arentsminde
Jammerbugt Mun.	Brovst Mun.	Brovst Parish Mun.	Øland Parish Mun.		Østerby
Jammerbugt Mun.	Brovst Mun.	Brovst Parish Mun.	Torslev Parish Mun.		Skovsgård
Jammerbugt Mun.	Brovst Mun.	Brovst Parish Mun.	Øster Svenstrup Parish Mun.		Ny Skovsgård
Jammerbugt Mun.	Brovst Mun.	Brovst Parish Mun.	Lerup-Tranum Parish Mun.		Tranum
Jammerbugt Mun.	Fjerritslev Mun.	Fjerritslev Parish Mun.			Fjerritslev
Jammerbugt Mun.	Fjerritslev Mun.	Haverslev-Bejstrup Parish Mun.			Bonderup
Jammerbugt Mun.	Fjerritslev Mun.	Skræm Parish Mun.			Skræm
Jammerbugt Mun.	Fjerritslev Mun.	Kettrup-Gøttrup Parish Mun.			Gøttrup
Jammerbugt Mun.	Fjerritslev Mun.	Hjortdal Parish Mun.			Hjortdal
Jammerbugt Mun.	Fjerritslev Mun.	Vester Torup-Klim Parish Mun.			Klim
Jammerbugt Mun.	Fjerritslev Mun.	Vester Torup-Klim Parish Mun.			Vester Torup
Jammerbugt Mun.	Fjerritslev Mun.	Vust Parish Mun.			Vust

== Towns ==
These are settlements in the municipality with populations of at least 200 inhabitants (2020).

Aabybro	6,161
Fjerritslev	3,376
Pandrup	2,925
Brovst	2,729
Kås	2,490
Biersted	1,646

Nørhalne	1,435
Gjøl	898
Skovsgård	837
Saltum	687
Birkelse	666
Hune	633

Halvrimmen	617
Blokhus	511
Klim	441
Tranum	423
Arentsminde	417
Ingstrup	366

Østerby	365
Vester Hjermitslev	358
Vester Torup	255
Ny Skovsgård	231
Gøttrup	203
Bonderup	201

=== Aabybro ===
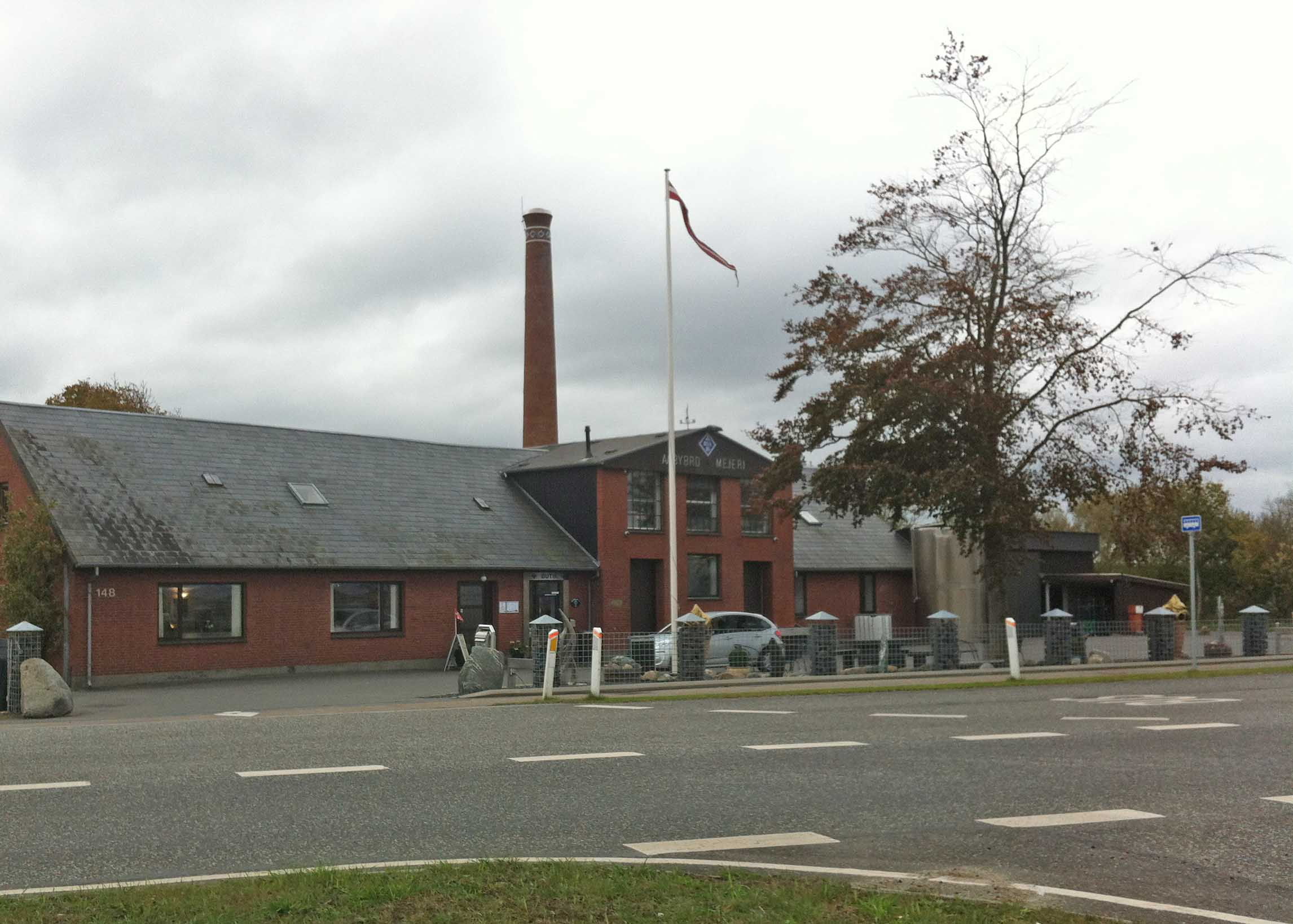
Aabybro Dairy.

Aabybro is the main city of the municipality and the seat of the municipal council. It is located in the eastern part of the municipality.

North of the town is an ice cream factory from 1888, Aabybro Dairy (Danish: Aabybro Mejeri). Also to the north is an efterskole, as well as Aaby Church and many residential areas. Along the town's main road, on the western part of town, is a number of shops and amenities, including a school and a library. The remainder of the western, central and eastern parts of Aabybro are mainly residential areas. The southern part of the town has an industrial area, which also includes a number of shops and a school.

=== Fjerritslev ===
Fjerritslev is located 28 km west of Aabybro, 35 km northeast of Thisted and 13 km north of Løgstør.

In the town is a number of shops and amenities, including a cinema. Fjerritslev Brewery- and Local Museum (Danish: Fjerritslev Bryggeri- og Egnsmuseum) is also located in the town, and tells about the history of brewery, as well as the local history. In the summer, Fjerritslev hosta a weekly market along its main street.

=== Pandrup ===
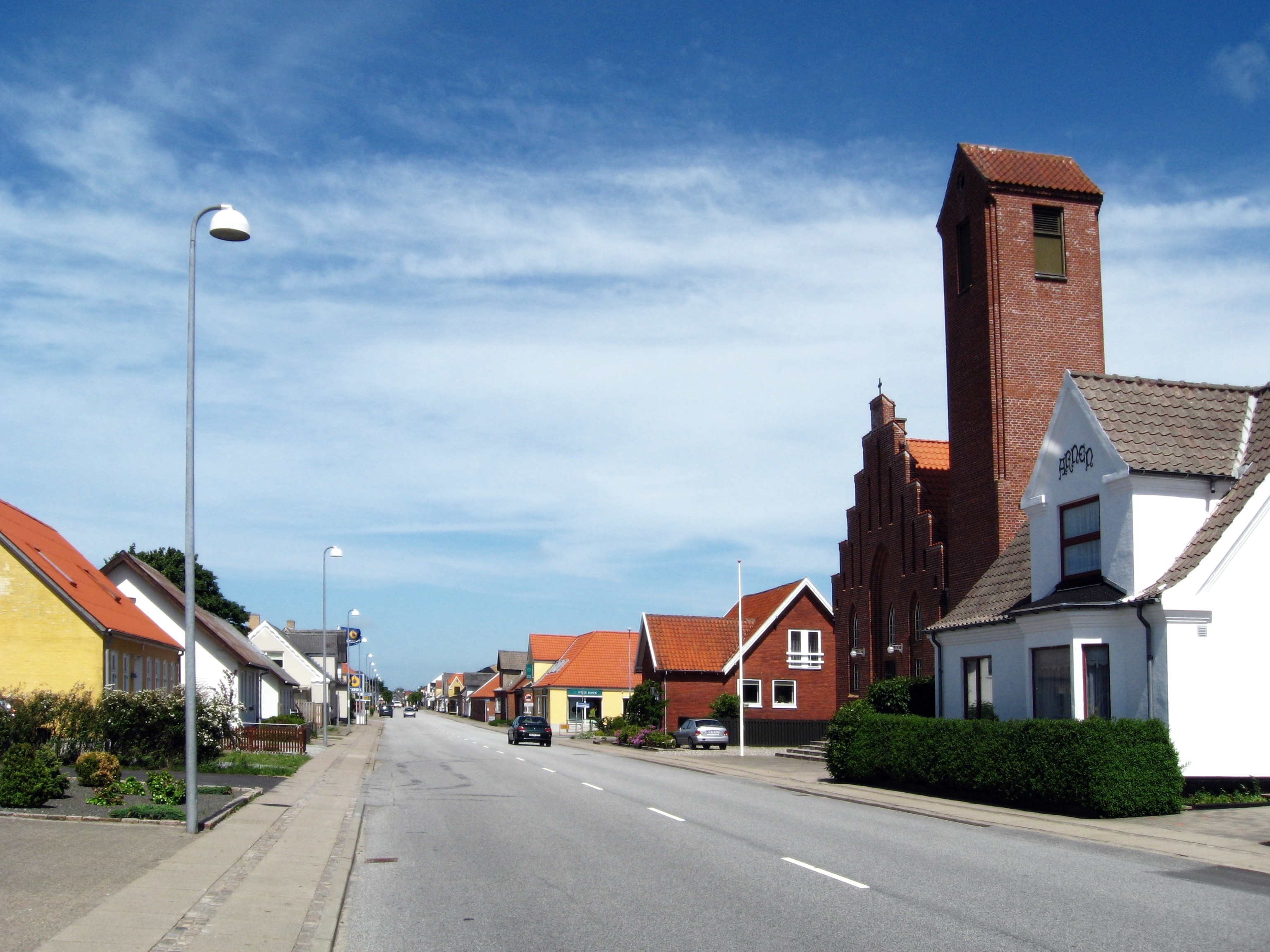
Street in Pandrup.

Pandrup is located in the northern part of the municipality, 1 km north of Kås, 4 km north of Aabybro and 15 km southwest of Brønderslev.

It is located close to nearby vacation homes, and hosts a yearly shopping event during the summer. A sports center is also located in the town.

=== Brovst ===
Brovst is located centrally in the municipality, 15 km southwest of Aabybro and 16 km east of Fjerritslev.

The central location of the town allows for easy access to the many nature areas located centrally in the municipality.

=== Villages ===
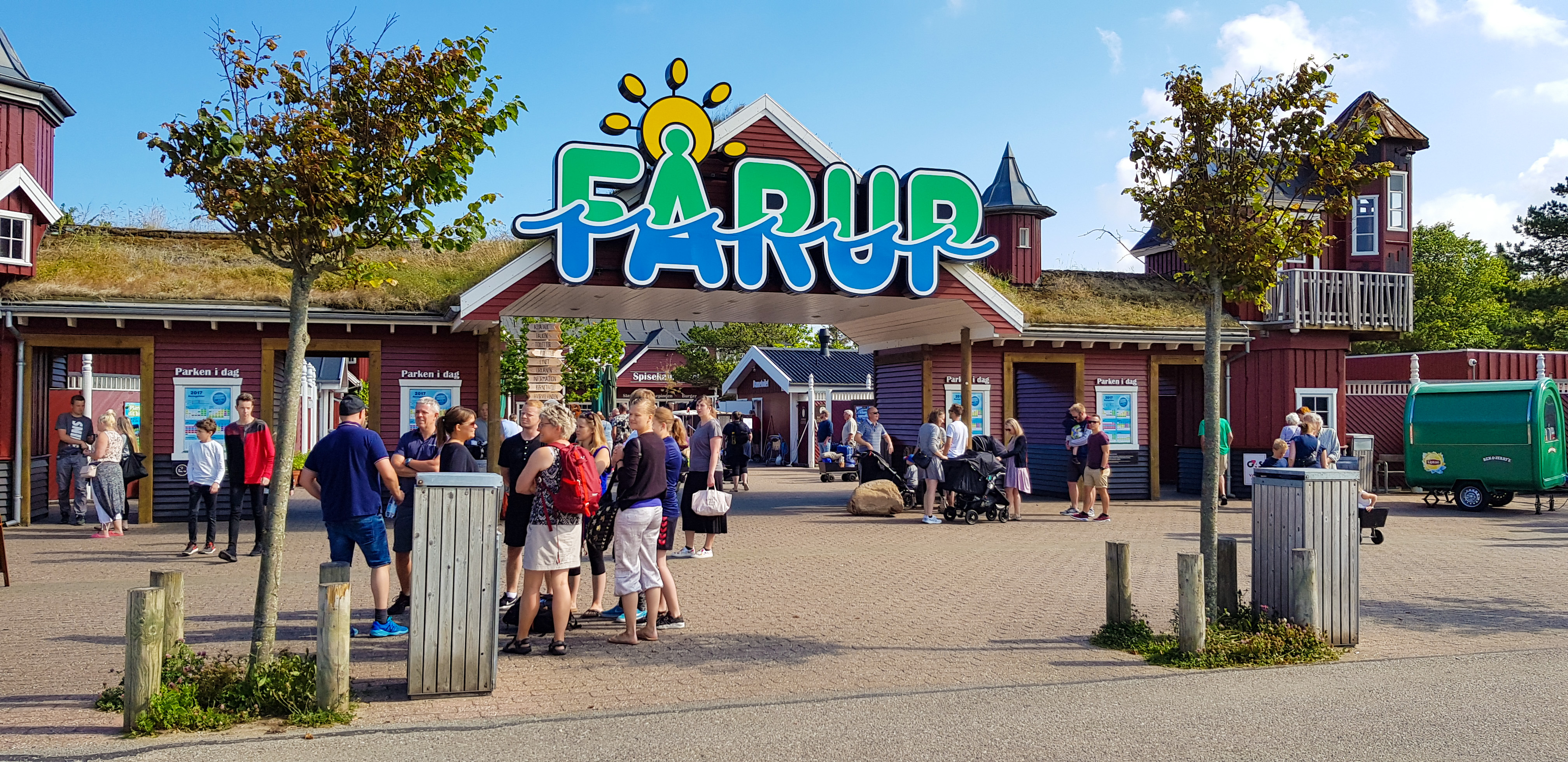
Fårup Summer Park.

With no major towns in the municipality, many citizens of Jammerbugt Municipality live in villages. Only Aabybro, Fjerritslev, Pandrup, Kås, Brovst and Skovsgård has a relatively high population density, with the rest of the municipality being much less densely populated. This leads to a lot of small villages and scattered settlements.

One of Denmark's biggest amusement parks, Fårup Summer Park, is located by the villages of Hune and Saltum.

Grønhøj, located in the northern part of the municipality, is connected to Løkken and is a large area with vacation homes. The area include a number of amenities, including a public pool and sports hall.

In the village of Hune is the Museum for paper art (Danish: Museum for papirkunst).

In addition to these villages, there are a number of smaller settlements in the municipality. These are all the settlements with populations of less than 200 people:

Aldrup
Alsbjerg
Alstrup
Alstrup Nymark
Andrup
Andrup Bjerge
Attrup
Barkær
Bejstrup
Bejstrup Nørrevang
Bejstrup Søndervang
Biersted Mejeriby
Bjerget
Blegebrønde
Bonderup Vang
Borup
Bratbjerg
Bratbjerg Gårde
Brovst Enge
Brødløse
Brødslev
Brøndum
Bunken
Bækken
Dommerborg
Drøstrup
Dyreng
Ejersted
Ejstrup
Ellidsbøl
Engesgård

Favskær
Flegum
Fredensdal
Fristrup
Fuglskær
Fårup
Fårup Klit
Gjøl Mark
Græsrimmen
Grønhøj
Grønnestrand
Gundestrup Mark
Gøttrup Have
Gøttrup Hede
Gøttrup Holme
Gøttrup Nørmark
Gøttrup Rimme
Gøttrup Sten
Gøttrup Strand
Hassig
Haverslev
Haverslev Vang
Havgårde
Heden
Hjortdal
Holmsø
Holtehuse
Hoven
Hovengen
Hunetorp
Husby

Hvolgårds Mark
Hvorup Klit
Højen
Janum
Jarmsted
Jonstrup
Jægerum
Kalsengård Kær
Kettrup
Kettrup Bjerge
Kirkebakken
Kirkedal
Klavsholm Mark
Klim Fjordholme
Klim Mark
Klim Odde
Klim Strand
Klithuse
Knøsgård
Kokkedal Mark
Kokkedals Kær
Koldborg Mark
Koldmose
Kollerup
Korsholm
Kringelstederne
Krogen
Kryle Klit
Kvindbjerg
Kvorup
Kvorup Kær

Kvorup Mark
Kærgårde
Kølvring
Kølvring Kær
Langbak
Langeslund Mark
Lejrmarken
Lerup Klithuse
Lien Gårde
Lille Pandrup
Lundbak
Lunde Mark
Lundergård Mark
Lørsted
Løt
Manstrup
Manstrup Mark
Marie Andersens Klit
Markhusene
Mejlhede
Melkær
Moukær
Mumgårde
Munkens Klit
Myager
Møgelvold
Mølgårdsmark
Møllebosletten
Neest
Nybæk
Nymark

Nørhalne Hedehuse
Nørhalne Markhuse
Nørre Bratbjerg
Nørre Skovsgård
Nørre Økse
Nørre Økse Enge
Nørre Økse Kær
Nørre Økse Sø
Nørredige
Nørremarken
Nørtorup Hede
Nørtorup Kær
Nørtorup Mark
Pandrup Mark
Pirup
Pirupshvarre
Præstens Kær
Purkær
Rendbæk
Rimmehuse
Rimmen
Risager
Roppen
Rævhede
Rødehede
Rødesig
Rødhus
Rødhus Klit
Røgild
Saltum Kær
Saltum Mark

Sanden
Sandmosen
Siggårdsholm
Skald
Skallerne
Skerping
Skjulsmark
Skovengene
Skovgårde
Skræm
Skødsholm
Slettestrand
Sløjhuse
Smalby
Spavngårde
Stagsted
Stenmark
Stjerslev
Stride
Svinkløv
Sylt
Søenge
Søkær
Sønder Bratbjerg
Sønder Kettrup
Sønder Saltum
Sønder Skovsgård Mark
Sønder Økse
Sønderby
Søndergårde
Tanderup

Telling
Terp
Tornmark
Torpet
Torpet Kær
Torslev Enge
Torslev Kær
Torslev Mark
Torup Holme
Torup Kær
Torup Strand
Tranekær
Tranum Enge
Tranum Klit
Tranum Strand
Trekroner
Trindbjerg
Trudslev
Trudslev Kær
Trustrup
Trøjborg
Tvilstedgård
Tværkær
Ullerup
Ulveskov
Under Skoven
Underlien
Vedsted Kær
Vester Hjermitslev Kær
Vester Rendbæk
Vester Svenstrup

Vesterby
Villerup Kær
Vilbæksminde
Voldbro
Voldkær
Vust
Vust Holme
Vust Kær
Vust Rimme
Vævergårde
Ørebrø
Øslev
Øslevholme Huse
Øster Rendbæk
Øster Svenstrup Hede
Øster Svenstrup Mark
Østerkær
Østrup
Aaby Hede
Aaby Kær
Aaby Mose
Ågård Skovhuse
Ågårdsmark
Ålegårds Mark
Ålested
Årup
Årup Hede
Åstrup

== Nature ==
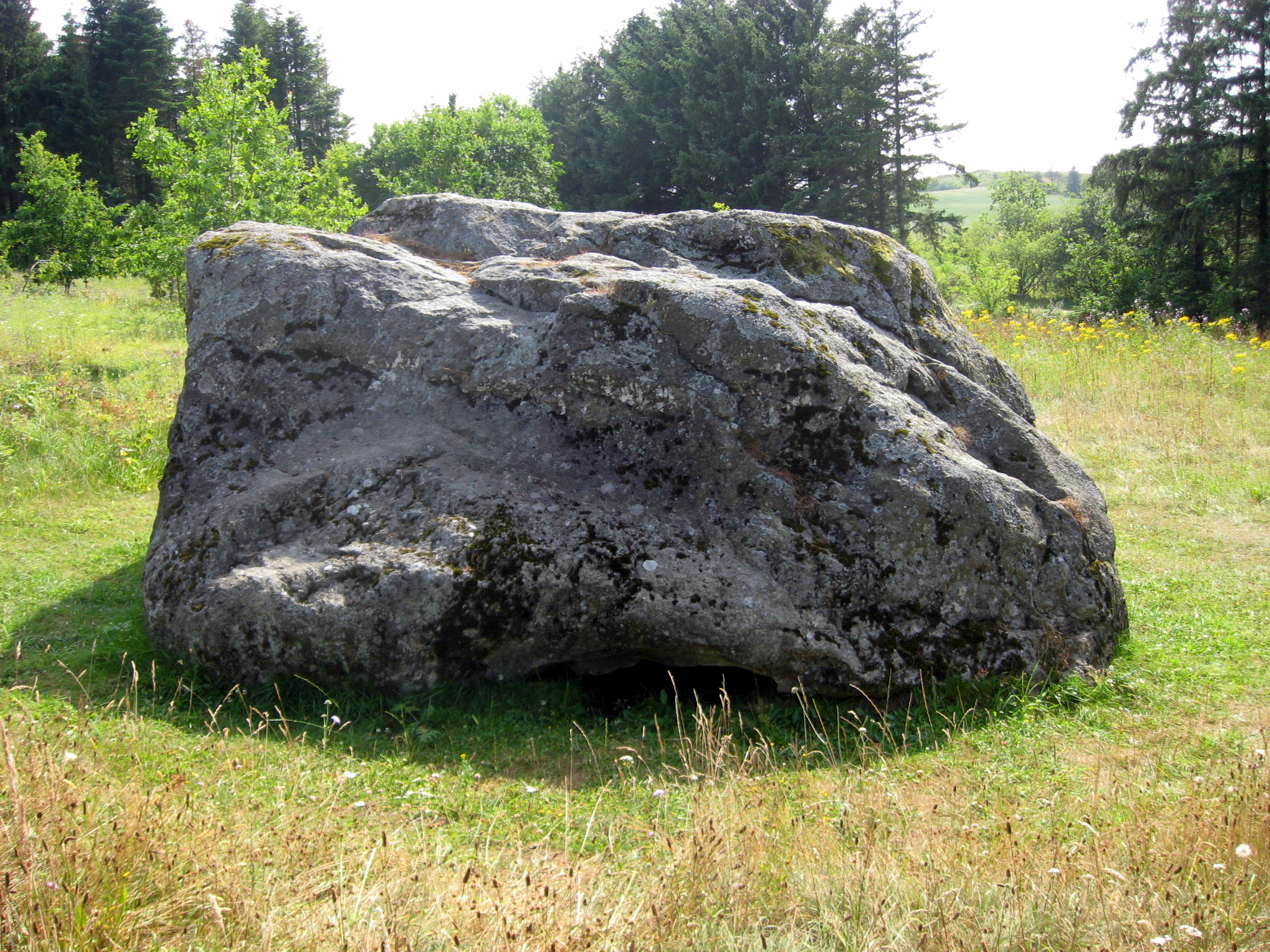
Janum Kjøt

There are many nature areas in the municipality, and many of them are protected. The municipality is also located by the Limfjord, which is a large fjord that separates the North Jutlandic Island from mainland Jutland. The fjord is home to a large variety of flora and fauna.

A beach, heath and dune area known as Grønnestrand and Svinkløv was protected in 1972. The area is an important place for breeding birds, with a large variety of birds breeding here.

Hingelbjerge is a forest and heath which has been protected since 1968. 129 acres are protected.

Southeast of Fjerritslev are 136 protected acres of heath and forest. This area is known as Skårhøjene. In the forest breed several birds, including the European green woodpecker and Eurasian nuthatch.

Other protected nature areas in the municipality include the hills of Alsbjerg Hills (Danish: Alsbjerg Bakker), covering 40 acres. Also protected is approximately 9 acres around the large rock of Janum Kjøt.

=== Dune plantations ===
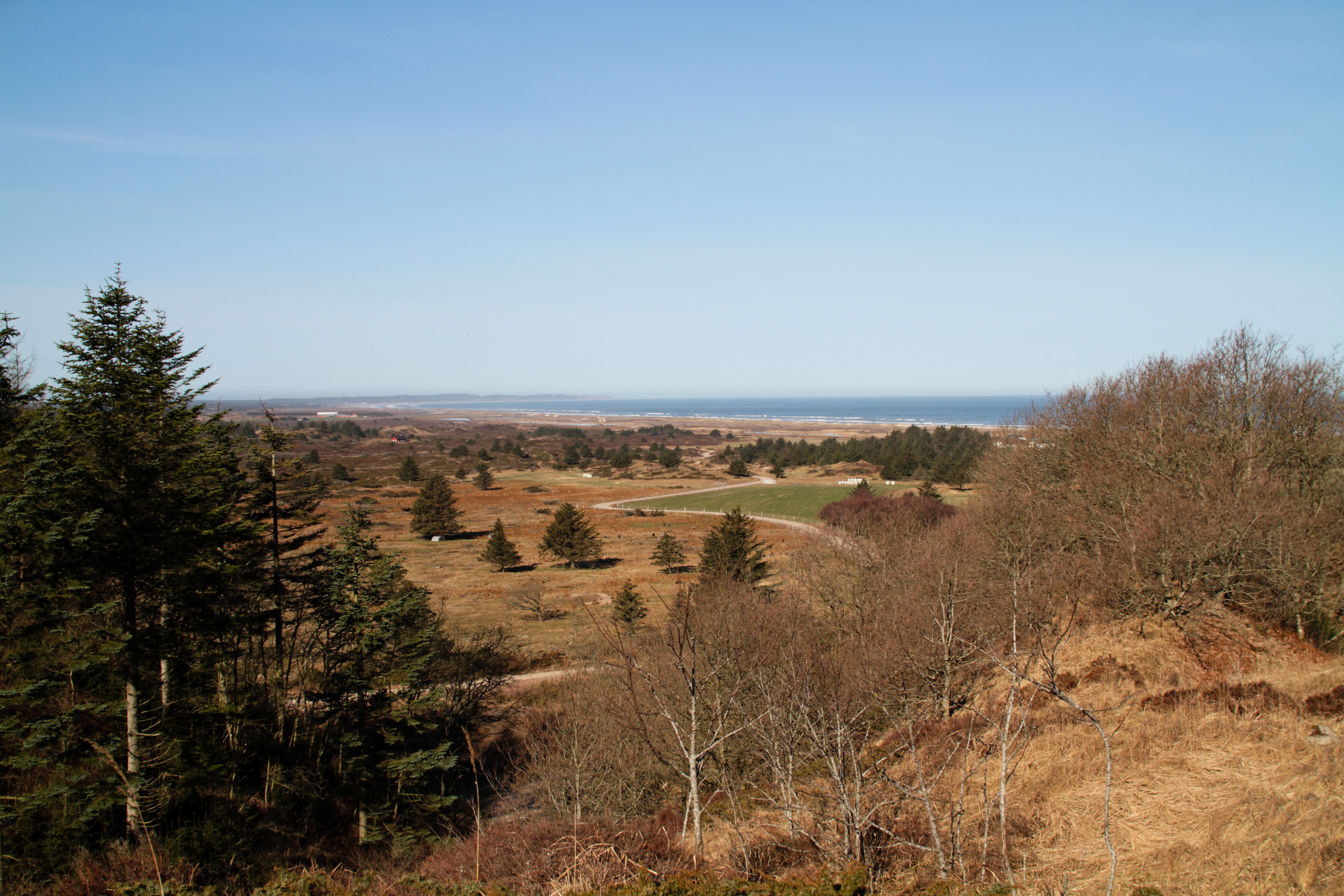
Svinkløv Dune Plantation

In the northwestern corner of the municipality, bordering Thisted Municipality, is Vester Thorup Dune Plantation (Danish: Vester Thorup Klitplantage). In it is a small protected area. It's a chalk cliff with a unique flora known as Valbjerg Sande.

Vester Thorup Dune Plantation is home to a rich flora, including plants such as drug eyebright, deer fern, wintergreen, rough horsetail, lesser twayblade, marsh helleborine, butterwort, moonwort, Danish kidneyvetch and field gentian.

Although the flora is similar in most of the dune plantations along the municipality's coast, there are slight differences. In the Fosdal Plantation, located slightly north between Fjerritslev and Brovst, is a heath which is home to the wolf's bane, a rare plant in Denmark.

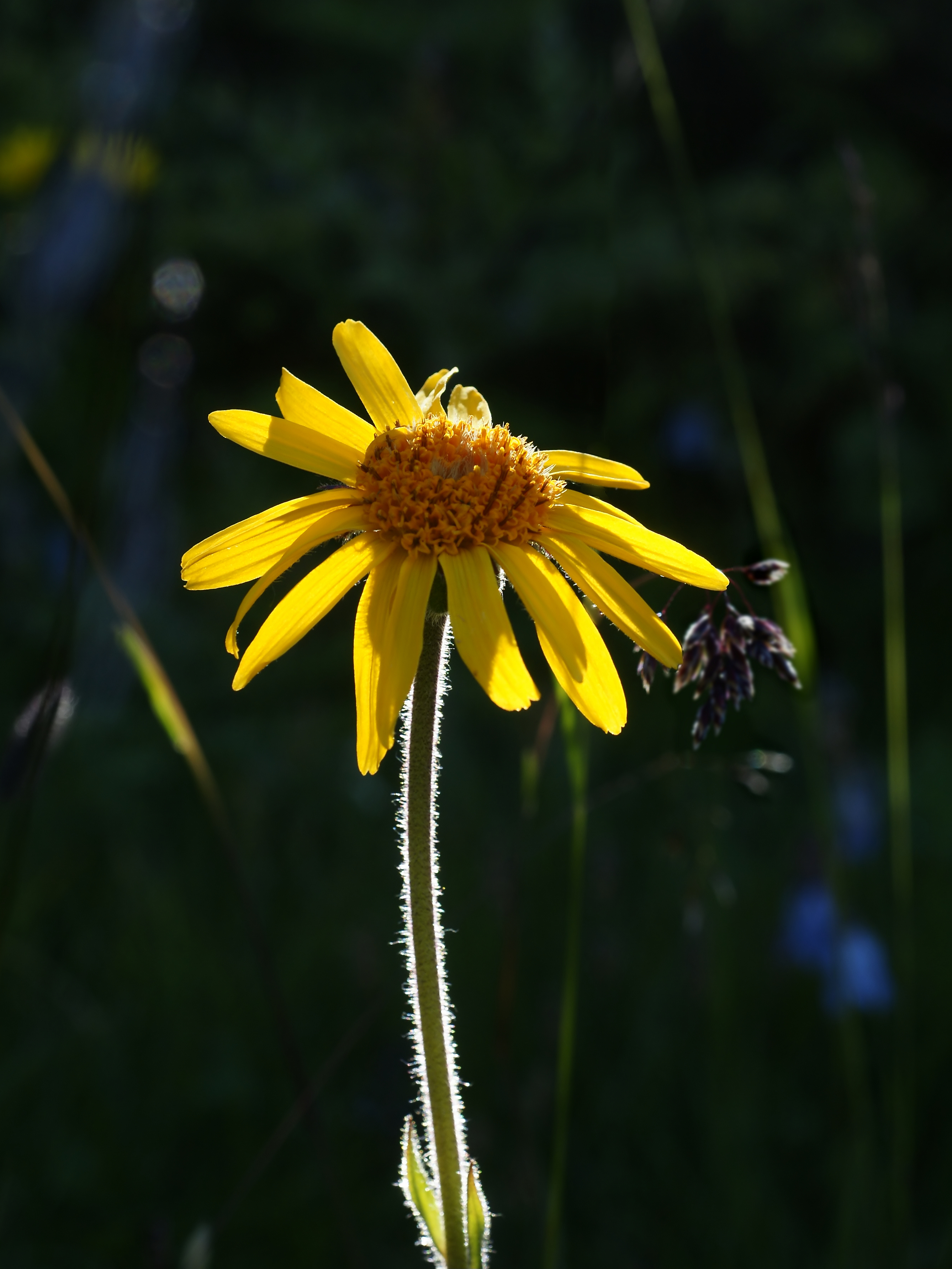
Wolf's bane, a rare plant in Denmark, can be found in the Fosdal Plantation

The fauna in the municipality's dune plantation include many birds and insects. There are mammals, such as polecats and hares, though there generally aren't many mammals in the dune plantations. Tranum Dune Plantation, west of Pandrup, has a population of roe deer, as does Blokhus Dune Plantation further north.

The carpenter ant can be found in Vester Thorup Dune Plantation. The marsh fritillary, rare in Denmark, can be found in Tranum Dune Plantation.

Birds breeding in the plantations include nightjar, redstart, European pied flycatcher and red-backed shrike. During the winter the white-throated dipper can be found in Svinkløv Plantation and Kollerup Plantation.

A large area of 3,000 acres is protected, including parts of Fosdal Plantation and Langdal Plantation. It was protected in 1902, then expanded again in 1954, 1956, 1962 and 2009. Also protected is seven separate areas, amounting to 415 acres total, located between Rødhus and Løkken.

Klim Dune Plantation can also be found in the municipality, located between the plantations of Vester Thorup and Kollerup.

=== Store Vildmose ===
Store Vildmose is a bogland located north of Aabybro. It is the remnant of an extensive raised peat bog, in large part drained by constructed canals in the early 20th century. Some areas are still relatively untouched and give an impression of the original nature of this bog. 1895 acres are protected.

The bogland is home to the cloudberry, which is a rare plant in Denmark. The Eurasian otter can be found here.

=== Jammerbugten Seafloor ===
The coast of Jammerbugt forms a stretch of sandy beaches in an inwardly curved bay called Jammerbugten (Jammer Bay, or "the Bay of Woe"). The seafloor contains many shipwrecks which provide marine habitats for wildlife. It was thought that the majority of the seafloor was sandy with a low density of life forms, until a 2020 seafloor mapping project, run by danish explorer Klaus Thymann, found evidence of much greater biodiversity in a range seafloor habitats. The area is subject to further exploration in order to protect it from destructive fishing practices, preserving newly documented species such as Dead Man’s Finger coral (Alcyonium digitatum), which had never before been recorded in the area.

== Politics ==
In the municipal reform of 2007, the municipalities of Brovst Municipality, Fjerritslev Municipality, Pandrup Municipality and Aabybro Municipality were merged to form the current Jammerbugt Municipality.

=== Municipal council ===
Jammerbugt's municipal council consists of 27 members, elected every four years. Below is the current council composition:

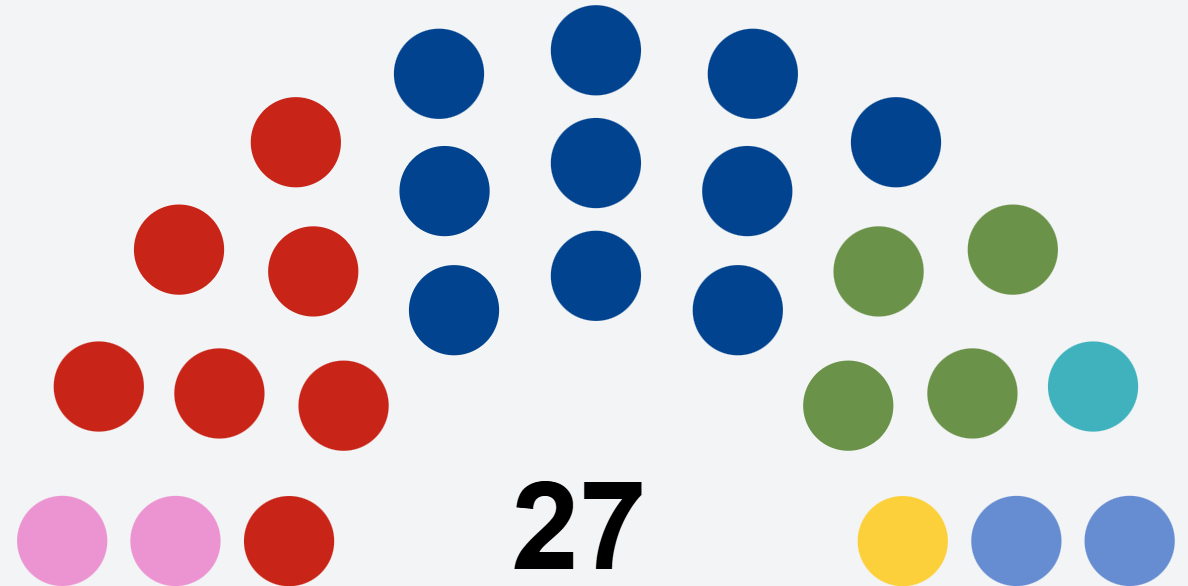

Below are the municipal councils elected between the enactment of the Municipal Reform of 2007 and the 2025 Danish local elections.

Election	Party											Total seats	Turnout	Elected mayor
Election	A	B	C	D	F	I	O	V	Æ	Ø	...	Total seats	Turnout	Elected mayor
2005	10	1			1		1	13			1	27	72.3%	Mogens Christian Gade (V)
2009	11		1		2		1	11			1	27	71.0%	Mogens Christian Gade (V)
2013	8		1		1		2	13		1	1	27	76.9%	Mogens Christian Gade (V)
2017	9				1		2	14			1	27	74.9%	Mogens Christian Gade (V)
2021	8		2	1	1		1	13			1	27	72.4%	Mogens Christian Gade (V)
2025	7		4		2	1	1	10	2			27	73.1%	Christian Hem (V)
Data from Kmdvalg.dk and Statistikbanken.dk

=== Mayors ===
Since the 2007 municipal reform, the mayors of Jammerbugt Municipality have been:

#	Mayor	Party	Term
1	Mogens Gade	Venstre	2007-2026
2	Christian Hem	Venstre	2026-

== Economy ==
The largest industries by number of employees in Jammerbugt Municipality are social institutions, retail, farming and fishing.

Companies with their headquarter in the municipality include Migatronic, a large welding machine company. The company's headquarter is set in Fjerritslev and the company has existed since 1970. Also in the municipality is Aabybro Dairy (Danish: Aabybro Mejeri), located in Aabybro. The dairy is home to the company Ryå Is, an ice cream factory.

== Demographics ==
Historical population
Year	Pop.	±%
2007	38,787	—
2008	38,957	+0.4%
2009	38,990	+0.1%
2010	38,927	−0.2%
2011	38,733	−0.5%
2012	38,611	−0.3%
2013	38,597	−0.0%
2014	38,351	−0.6%
2015	38,293	−0.2%
2016	38,466	+0.5%
2017	38,581	+0.3%
2018	38,638	+0.1%
2019	38,460	−0.5%
2020	38,324	−0.4%
2021	38,175	−0.4%
Source: Statistikbanken.dk

There are 38,324 people living in Jammerbugt Municipality (2020). 49.40% are women and 50.60% are men.

Below is the age distribution of the municipality.

Age
1. 0-5 (5.98%)
2. 6-17 (14.3%)
3. 18-35 (16.9%)
4. 36-64 (38.5%)
5. 64+ (24.3%)

== Education ==
There are 12 ground schools, 4 efterskoles, 4 independent schools and 1 music school in the municipality.

There are 4 libraries in the municipality.

== Sights ==
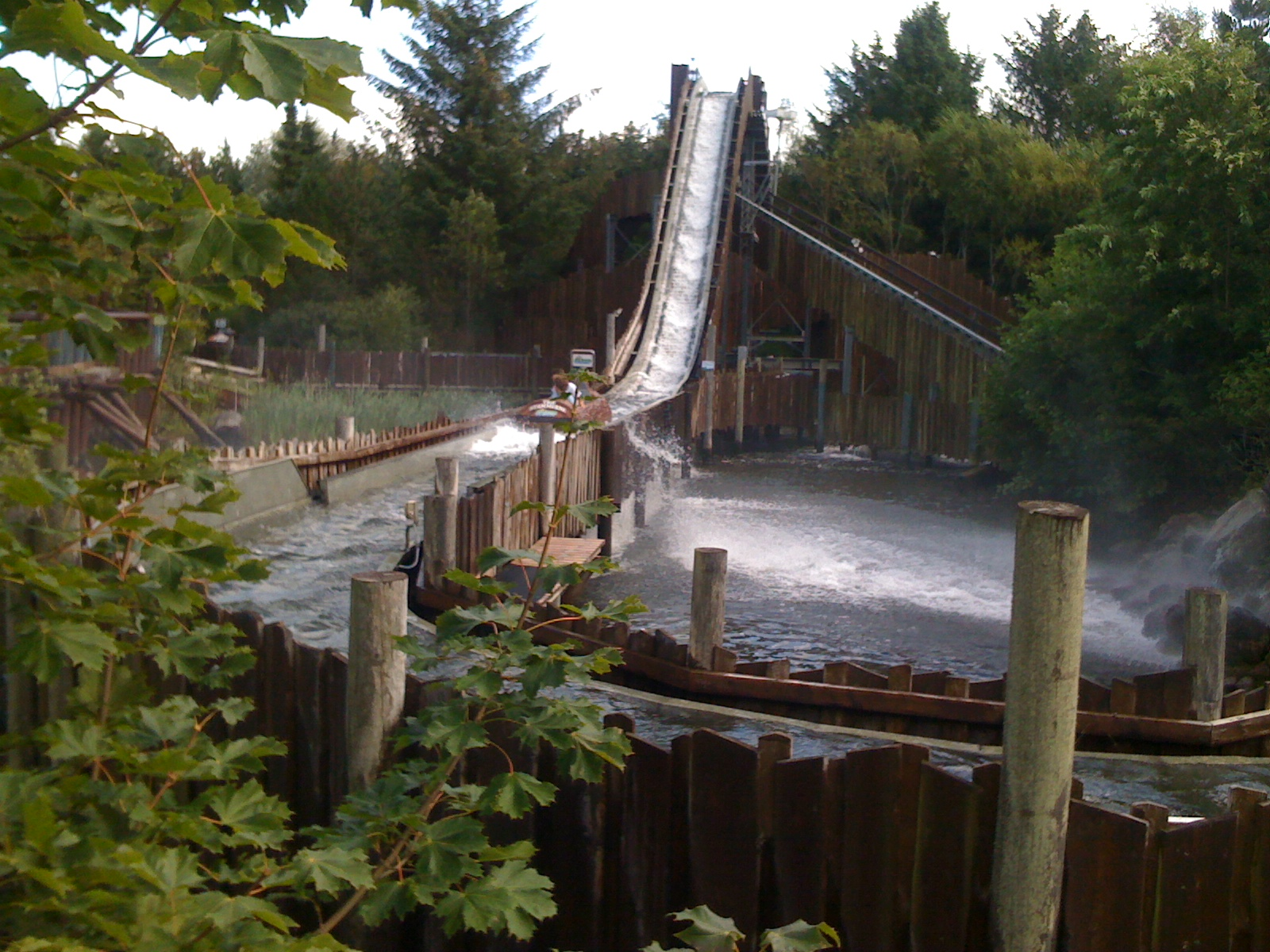
Log flume ride at Fårup Summer Park

The municipality is a popular vacation area in the summer, with numerous areas with vacation homes. As a result, the sights in the area are mostly open in the summer.

- Fårup Summer Park (Danish: Fårup Sommerland) is an amusement park located north of Pandrup. The park covers 90 acres and was first opened in 1975. It was the first summer park in Scandinavia.
- The Museum for paper art (Danish: Museum for papirkunst) is located in the village of Hune. The museum displays paper art, and also offers dining and venue services.
- Blokhus Sculpture Park (Danish: Blokhus Skulpturpark) is located in Hune. It is a park of sand sculptures.
- The Local Collection (Danish: Egnssamlingen) is a local museum in Saltum. The museum's focus is on the history of the surrounding area, approximately the territory of the former Pandrup Municipality. The museum also acts as the area's local archive.
- The Troll Museum (Danish: Troldemuseet) is a museum about the troll figures carved by Thomas Dam. The museum is located in Gjøl.
- Fjerritslev Brewery and Local Museum (Danish: Fjerritslev Bryggeri- og Egnsmuseum) is located in Fjerritslev. It is both a brewery museum and a local museum.

=== Castles and manors ===
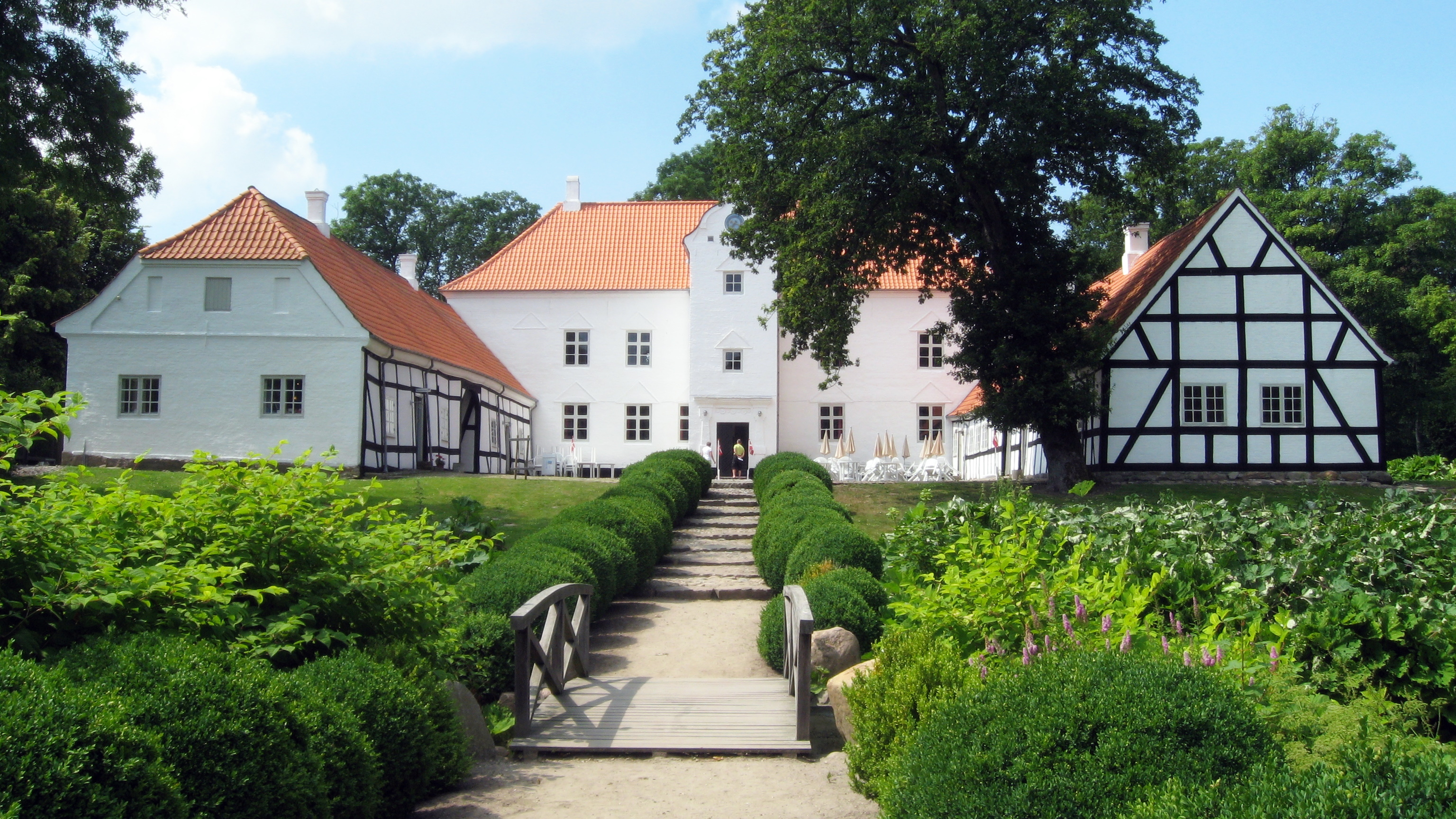
Bratskov manor

- Birkelse is a manor located west of Aabybro. It is named after Birkelse Skov, a nearby birch forest. The manor has belonged to the Skeel family since the middle of the 1600s.
- Birkumgaard is a manor located east of Gjøl. It belonged to Børglum Monastery from 1465 and until 1536 where it was taken by the crown.
- Bratskov is a manor located north of Brovst. It is known to have existed since at least 1317, though sources mention it from as early as the later half of the 1200s. It was owned by the Torstensen family in 1317, and remained in their possession until 1558. The manor was acquired by Brovst Municipality in 1976. In the 2007 municipal reform it was transferred to Jammerbugt Municipality.
- Kokkedal is a manor located south of Torslev. It is known to have existed since at least 1327. During the Thirty Years' War the forests of Kokkedal were cut down and never recovered. The manor house was bought by the Ministry of Social Affairs in 1948, and turned into a school house for boys. It returned into private ownership in 1988.
- Oxholm is a manor located south of Brovst. It is a former monastery, formerly named Ø Kloster.
- Rævkærgaard is a manor located northwest of Aabybro. The manor has existed since the 1500s and has been in the Skeel family since the 1600s.
- Aagaard is a manor located slightly south of Fjerritslev. It is known to have existed since at least 1355, where it was in the Gyldenstierne family. During peasant rebellions in 1438—1441 the manor was taken by the rebels. It was looted and burned. Aagaard was in the Gyldenstierne family until 1627, when Knud Gyldenstierne died. His widow, Sophie Lindenov, sold the manor to her mother in 1630, ending the Gyldenstierne's reign over the manor.

=== Churches ===
See List of churches in Jammerbugt Municipality

=== Events ===
The Saltum Wool Festival (Danish: Uldfestival Saltum) is a yearly event hosted in Saltum. The event focuses on wool, yarn and clothes and has existed since 2007. The event is the largest of its kind in Scandinavia.

== Parishes ==
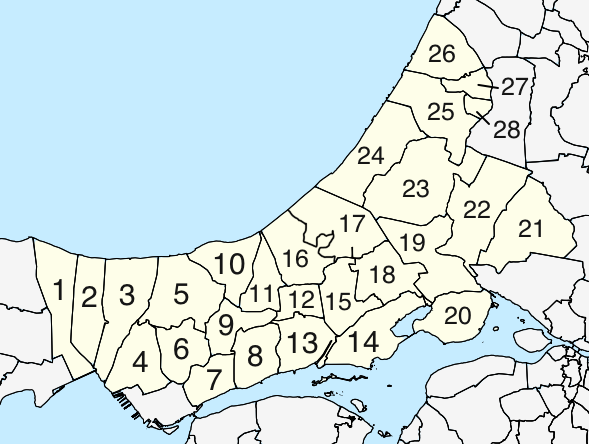
Parishes of Jammerbugt Municipality.

There are 28 parishes in Jammerbugt Municipality. Shown in the table below are the populations of each parish, as well as the percentage of that population that are members of the Church of Denmark. All numbers are from 1 January 2020.

#	Parish	Population	%	Source
1	Vust	103	77.67	
2	Vester Torup	610	80.00	
3	Klim	610	82.30	
4	Gøttrup	542	84.69	
5	Kollerup-Fjerritslev	3,761	87.00	
6	Kettrup	547	88.48	
7	Bejstrup	325	92.31	
8	Haverslev	582	86.43	
9	Skræm	316	93.99	
10	Hjortdal	457	88.84	
11	Lerup	142	78.87	
12	Øster Svenstrup	720	82.64	
13	Torslev	846	86.76	
14	Øland	558	91.22	
15	Brovst	3,097	80.56	
16	Tranum	721	80.86	
17	Koldmose	230	85.65	
18	Langeslund	1,391	87.35	
19	Vedsted	1,213	88.95	
20	Gjøl	1,177	87.94	
21	Biersted	3,641	88.03	
22	Aaby	12,219	70.14	
23	Jetsmark	6,144	86.04	
24	Hune	1,567	84.49	
25	Saltum	1,281	82.83	
26	Ingstrup	668	81.89	
27	Vester Hjermitslev	461	86.12	
28	Alstrup	73	86.30	

== Symbols ==
Coat of arms of Jammerbugt Municipality

The coat of arms of Jammerbugt Municipality is named Fuglen (Danish for "The Bird"). It was accepted by the city council on 6 June 2006. It features a white bird dividing the coat of arms in half. One half is blue, the other is green. The blue represents the ocean around Jammerbugt Municipality, with the green representing the land. The bird is free and embraces the entire area as a whole, while marking the coastline of Jammerbugt Municipality. The bird is looking ahead, to represent the municipality's vision and ambitions. It is meant to symbolise unity, openness, focus on the future and recreational nature areas.

== Notable residents ==
=== Public thought and politics ===
- Jens Haven (1724 in Vust — 1796), missionary in Canada
- Henriette Nielsen (1815 in Vester Torup — 1900), author
- Kirsten Kjær (1893–1985), painter
- Helle Juul (born 1954 in Vester Hjermitslev), architect
- Ole Christensen (born 1955 in Pandrup), politician and former MEP
- Mogens Gade (born 1961 in Øster Svenstrup), politician and mayor of the municipality
- Lone Drøscher Nielsen (born 1964 in Aabybro), wildlife conservationist
- Thomas Danielsen (born 1983 in Fjerritslev), politician and MF
- Ane Halsboe-Jørgensen (born 1983 in Brovst), politician and MF

=== Sport ===
- Hans Nielsen (born 1959 in Brovst), speedway rider
- Rikke Nielsen (born 1977 in Fjerritslev), handball player
- Pernille Holmsgaard (born 1984 in Pandrup), handball player
- Nicolaj Ritter (born 1992 in Brovst), football player
- Kasper Pedersen (born 1993 in Aabybro), football player
- Søren Reese (born 1993 in Ingstrup), football player
- Mikkel B. Andersen (born 1996 in Fjerritslev), speedway rider
