= Klim, Denmark =

Klim
- Village
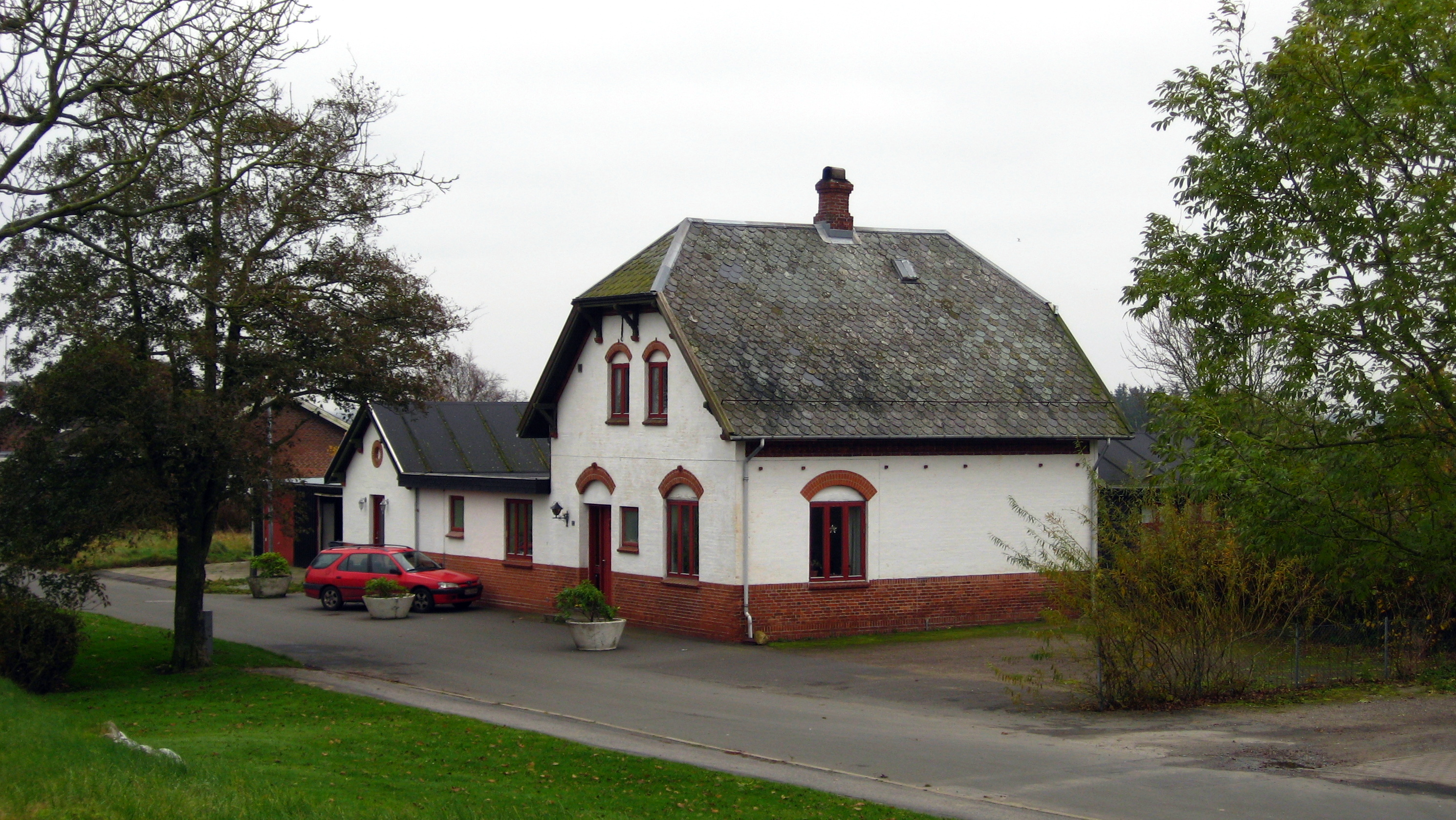
- The former Klim Station

- Location in the North Jutland Region
- Coordinates: 57°5′46″N 9°9′58″E
- Country: Denmark
- Region: North Jutland
- Municipality: Jammerbugt

Population (2026)
  - Total: 415
- Time zone: UTC+1 (CET)
  - Summer (DST): UTC+2 (CEST)

Klim is a village in North Jutland, Denmark. It is located in Jammerbugt Municipality.

== History ==
A train station was located in Klim between 1904 and 1969. The station was built by Heinrich Wenck, and it was a stop on the Thisted-Fjerritslev railroad.
