= Gøttrup =

- Village
- Location in the North Jutland Region
- Coordinates: 57°3′26″N 9°12′39″E
- Country: Denmark
- Region: North Jutland
- Municipality: Jammerbugt

Population (2020)
  - Total: 203
- Time zone: UTC+1 (CET)
  - Summer (DST): UTC+2 (CEST)

Gøttrup is a village in North Jutland, Denmark. It is located in Jammerbugt Municipality.
