= Kås =

- Town
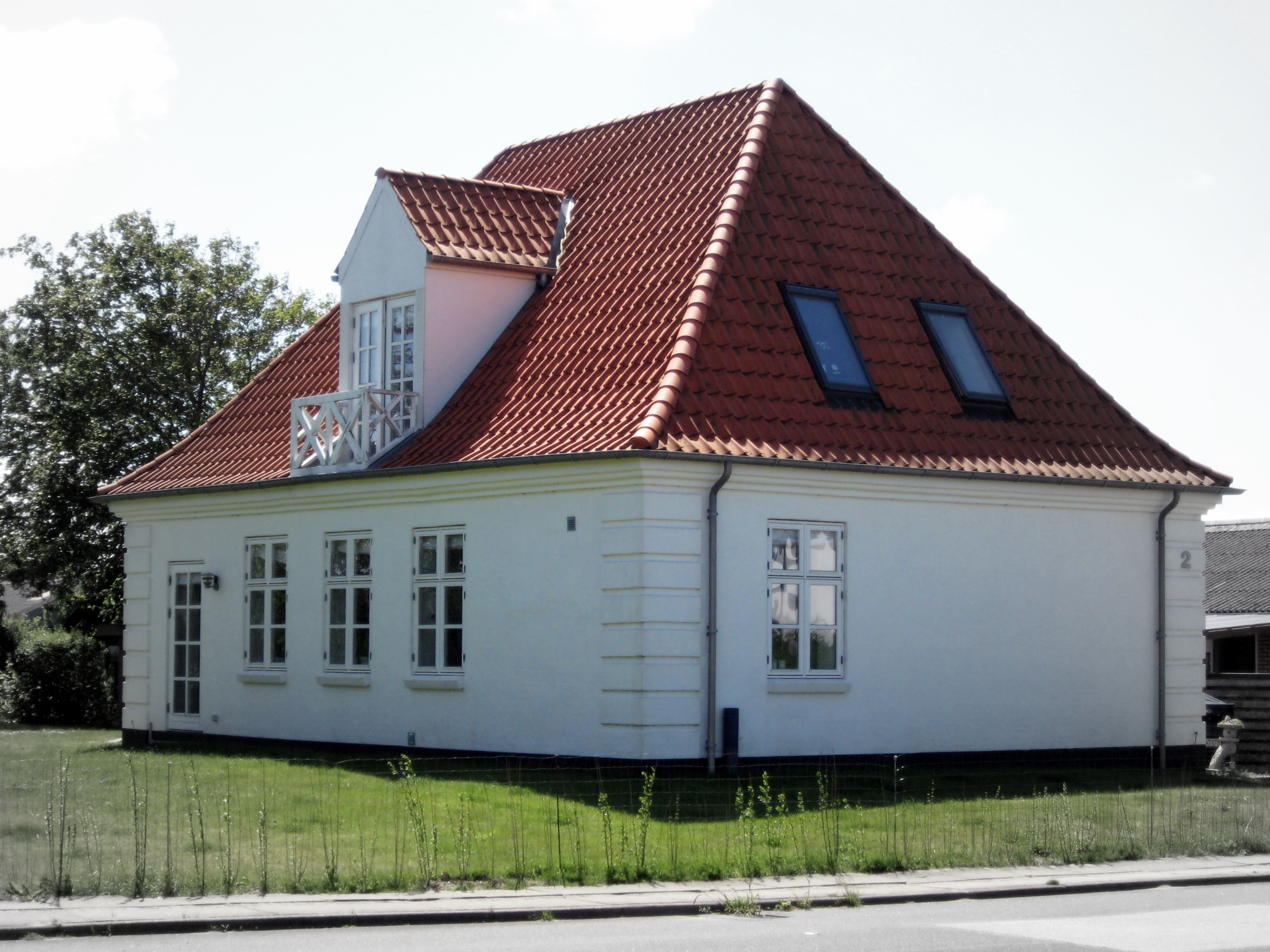
- The former Kås Station

- Location in the North Jutland Region
- Coordinates: 57°11′33″N 9°40′8″E
- Country: Denmark
- Region: North Jutland
- Municipality: Jammerbugt

Area
  - Urban: 2.02 km^{2} (0.78 sq mi)

Population (2026)
  - Urban: 2,292
  - Urban density: 1,130/km^{2} (2,940/sq mi)
- Time zone: UTC+1 (CET)
  - Summer (DST): UTC+2 (CEST)

Kås or Kaas is a town in North Jutland, Denmark. It is located in Jammerbugt Municipality. The town has nearly grown together with Pandrup, with only half a kilometer separating the two towns. Kås itself has grown together with the village of Moseby.

== History ==
Kås is known from 1463 as Kaalsz. In 1610, the name had changed to Kaas.

A train station was located in Kås between 1913 and 1969. The station was built by Sylvius Knutzen and was a stop on the Hjørring-Løkken-Aabybro railroad.
