= Østerby, Denmark =

Østerby
- Village
- Location in the North Jutland Region
- Coordinates: 57°3′30″N 9°36′21″E
- Country: Denmark
- Region: North Jutland
- Municipality: Jammerbugt

Population (2026)
  - Total: 320
- Time zone: UTC+1 (CET)
  - Summer (DST): UTC+2 (CEST)

Østerby is a village in North Jutland, Denmark. It is located in Jammerbugt Municipality.
