= Vester Hjermitslev =

- Village
- Location in the North Jutland Region
- Coordinates: 57°17′6″N 9°45′33″E
- Country: Denmark
- Region: North Jutland
- Municipality: Jammerbugt

Population (2026)
  - Total: 341
- Time zone: UTC+1 (CET)
  - Summer (DST): UTC+2 (CEST)

Vester Hjermitslev is a village in North Jutland, Denmark. It is located in Jammerbugt Municipality.

== Notable residents ==
- Helle Juul (born 1954), architect
