= Søren Reese =

Danish footballer (born 1993)

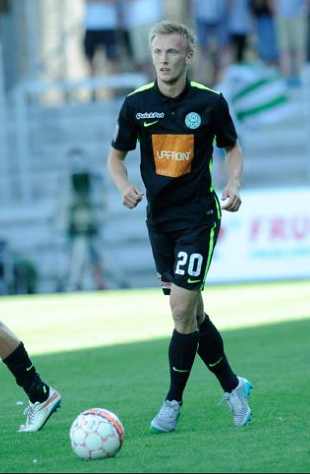

Personal information
- Date of birth: 29 July 1993 (age 33)
- Place of birth: Ingstrup, Denmark
- Height: 1.84 m (6 ft 0 in)
- Position: Centre-back

Youth career
- Ingstrup SF
- Blokhus FC

Senior career*
Years	Team	Apps	(Gls)
2010–2014	Jammerbugt		
2015–2018	Viborg	89	(5)
2018–2022	Midtjylland	0	(0)
2018–2019	→ Horsens (loan)	20	(2)
2020	→ Esbjerg (loan)	10	(0)
2020–2021	→ Zagłębie Lubin (loan)	0	(0)
2020–2021	→ Zagłębie Lubin II (loan)	3	(0)
2021	→ Horsens (loan)	16	(0)
2021	→ SønderjyskE (loan)	8	(0)
2022–2023	Haugesund	45	(3)
2023–2024	Horsens	29	(1)
2024–2025	Fremad Amager	17	(0)
2025	Middelfart	15	(0)
- * Club domestic league appearances and goals

Søren Reese (born 29 July 1993) is a Danish retired professional footballer who played as a centre-back.

== Career ==
=== Jammerbugt FC ===
Reese started his career at the local club Ingstrup SF, before he joined Blokhus FC at the age of 16, which in 2013 became Jammerbugt FC. A few months after his arrival from Ingstrup SF, he made his debut in the Danish 2nd Division for Jammerbugt at the age of only 16. In June 2014, Reese went on a trial at Viborg FF, but returned to Jammerbugt in the following week.

=== Viborg FF ===
6 months after a trial at Viborg FF, the club confirmed in December 2014, that they had signed the player on a 2,5-year contract.

=== FC Midtjylland ===
On 13 June 2018, Reese joined FC Midtjylland on a 5-year contract and was immediately loaned out to AC Horsens. On 16 January 2020, he was loaned out again, this time to Esbjerg fB for the rest of the season.

He went on his third loan spell in August 2020, joining Polish Ekstraklasa club Zagłębie Lubin for the 2020–21 season. However, Reese got no playing time in Zagłębie's first team and made just three appearances for their reserve side. For that reason, the loan deal was terminated on 10 January 2021 and Reese returned to Denmark, where he instead returned to AC Horsens on a loan deal for the rest of the season. On 31 August 2021, he joined SønderjyskE on loan for the rest of 2021.

=== Haugesund ===
On 14 February 2022, Reese moved to Norwegian Eliteserien club FK Haugesund on a deal until the end of 2024.

=== Return to Horsens ===
On 31 July 2023, newly relegated Danish 1st Division club AC Horsens confirmed that Reese had signed with the club until June 2026. Reese wanted to return home to Denmark for family reasons, which is why he left Haugesund early.

On 26 August 2024, the club confirmed that the player's contract had been terminated with immediate effect by mutual agreement as he was too far from playing time.

=== Fremad Amager ===
On 10 September 2024 Danish 2nd Division side Fremad Amager confirmed that Reese had joined the club. He left the club at the end of the season.

=== Middelfart ===
On 15 July 2025, Reese joined newly promoted Danish 1st Division side Middelfart Boldklub on a six-month deal.

In December 2025, 32-year old Reese announced his retirement from football.
