= Thorup =

Coordinates: 57°00′N 9°15′E

Thorup (or Torup) is the name of at least thirteen villages and towns in Denmark and is also used as a surname. The name Thorup ends on "rup" (rup, strup, torp, and drup are all descended from an old Scandinavian designation for a group of houses), which means that it originates from the late Viking Age, circa AD 1000. The name Thorup may refer to:

== People ==
- Børge Thorup (born 1943), Danish football player
- Jess Thorup (born 1970), Danish football player and manager
- Johannes Hoff Thorup (born 1989), Danish football manager
- Jørgen Thorup (born 1950), Danish fencer
- Kirsten Thorup (born 1942), Danish author
- Majken Thorup (born 1979), Danish swimmer
- Mikkel Thorup (born 1965), Danish computer scientist
- Peter Thorup (1948–2007), Danish musician
- Stanley N. Thorup (1929–1997), American lawyer, judge, and politician
- Thurop Van Orman (born 1976), American animator

== See also ==
- Torup, Halland, Sweden

== Sources ==
- A Danish document on place names
