= Skovsgård =

- Village
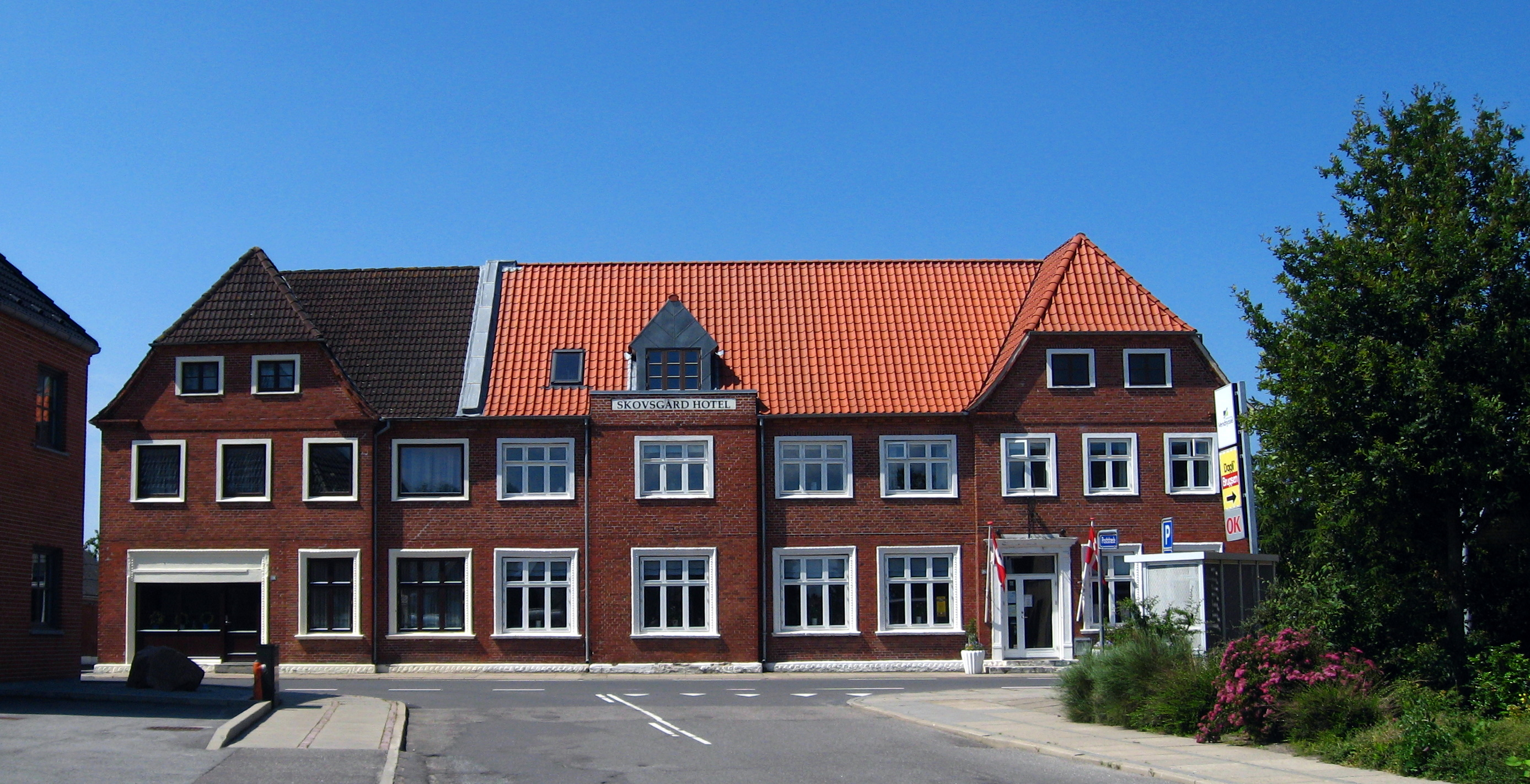
- Skovsgård Hotel

- Location in the North Jutland Region
- Coordinates: 57°5′17″N 9°29′7″E
- Country: Denmark
- Region: North Jutland
- Municipality: Jammerbugt

Area
  - Total: 0.88 km^{2} (0.34 sq mi)

Population (2026)
  - Total: 757
  - Density: 860/km^{2} (2,200/sq mi)
- Time zone: UTC+1 (CET)
  - Summer (DST): UTC+2 (CEST)

Skovsgård is a village in North Jutland, Denmark. It is located in Jammerbugt Municipality.
