= Mogens Christen Gade =

Danish politician

Mogens Gade

Mayor of Jammerbugt Municipality
- Incumbent
- Assumed office 1 January 2007

Mayor of Brovst Municipality
- In office 1 January 2002 – 31 December 2006
- Preceded by: Ole Christensen (S)

Personal details
- Born: 8 March 1961 (age 65) Øster Svenstrup, Denmark
- Party: Venstre

Mogens Christian Gade (born 8 March 1961) is a Danish politician. He is a member of the party Venstre, and is the current mayor in Jammerbugt Municipality.
