= Hune =

- Village
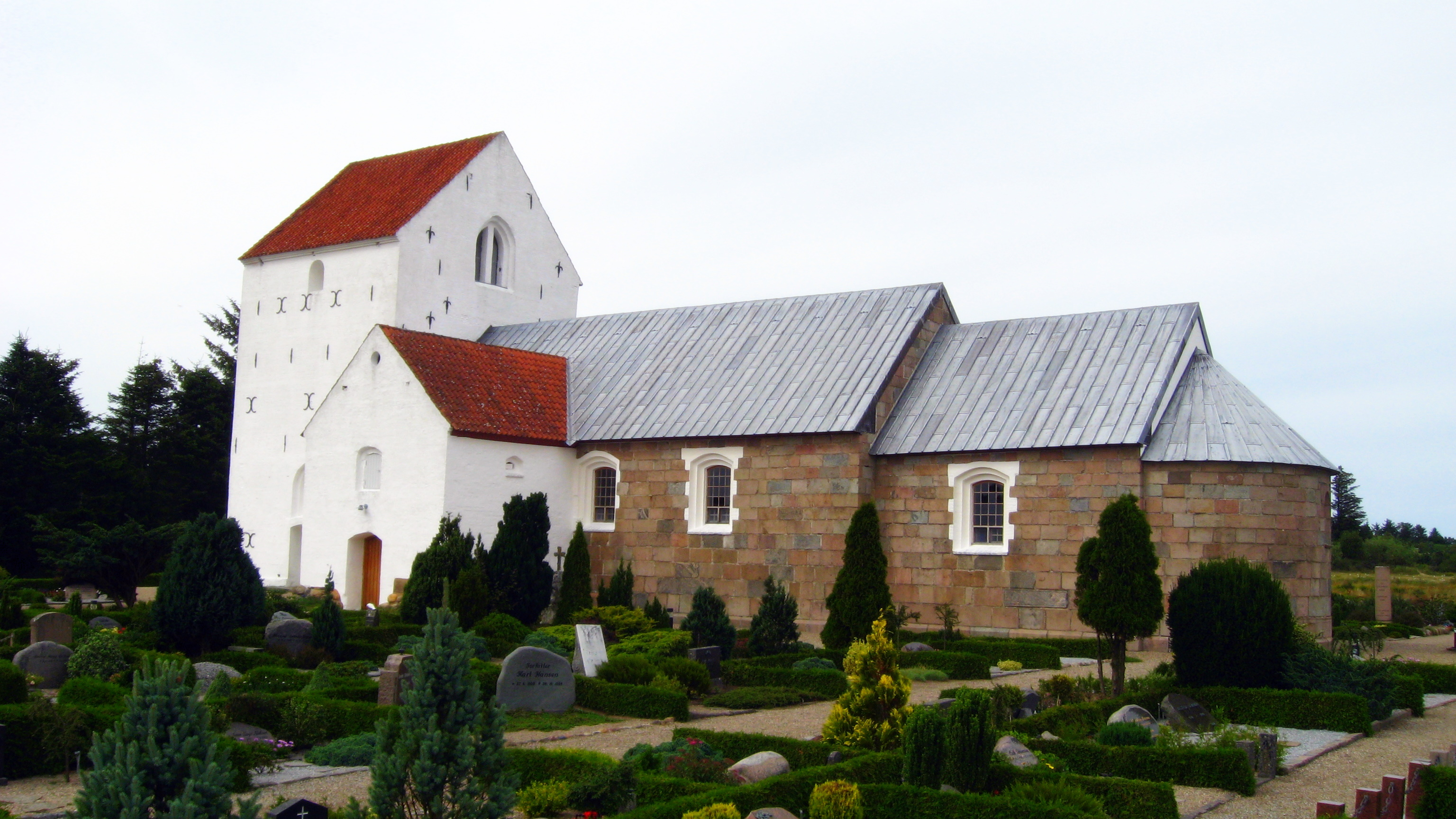
- Hune Church

- Location in the North Jutland Region
- Coordinates: 57°14′52″N 9°37′23″E
- Country: Denmark
- Region: North Jutland
- Municipality: Jammerbugt

Population (2026)
  - Total: 725
- Time zone: UTC+1 (CET)
  - Summer (DST): UTC+2 (CEST)

Hune is a village in North Jutland, Denmark. It is located in Jammerbugt Municipality.

== Blokhus Sculpture Park ==
Blokhus Sculpture Park (Danish: Blokhus Skulpturpark) is located in Hune. It is a sculpture park with sculptures in sand, concrete and wood. The main attraction of the park is the large sand sculptures, created by professionals and costing approximately 80,000 DKK (12,998.56 USD) a piece to create. Although the concrete and wood sculptures cost similarly much, they generally remain permanently in the park, while the sand sculptures only last a short time.
