= Henriette Nielsen =

Danish playwright

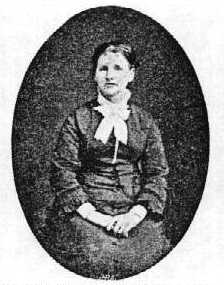
Henriette Nielsen

Birgitte Dorothea Henriette Nielsen, pen name Theodora, (23 January 1815 – 17 January 1900) was a Danish writer and playwright born in Strandgården, Vester Thorup, in the north of Jutland. Her Slægtningene (1849), presented in Copenhagen's Royal Danish Theatre, was particularly successful with its pre-vaudeville atmosphere, local costumes from Fanø and songs she had composed herself. It ran to 78 performances.

Her 1862 novel Esberhs Skolehistorier (Esberh's School Stories) is seen as an early example of works calling for women's emancipation.
