= Saltum =

- Village
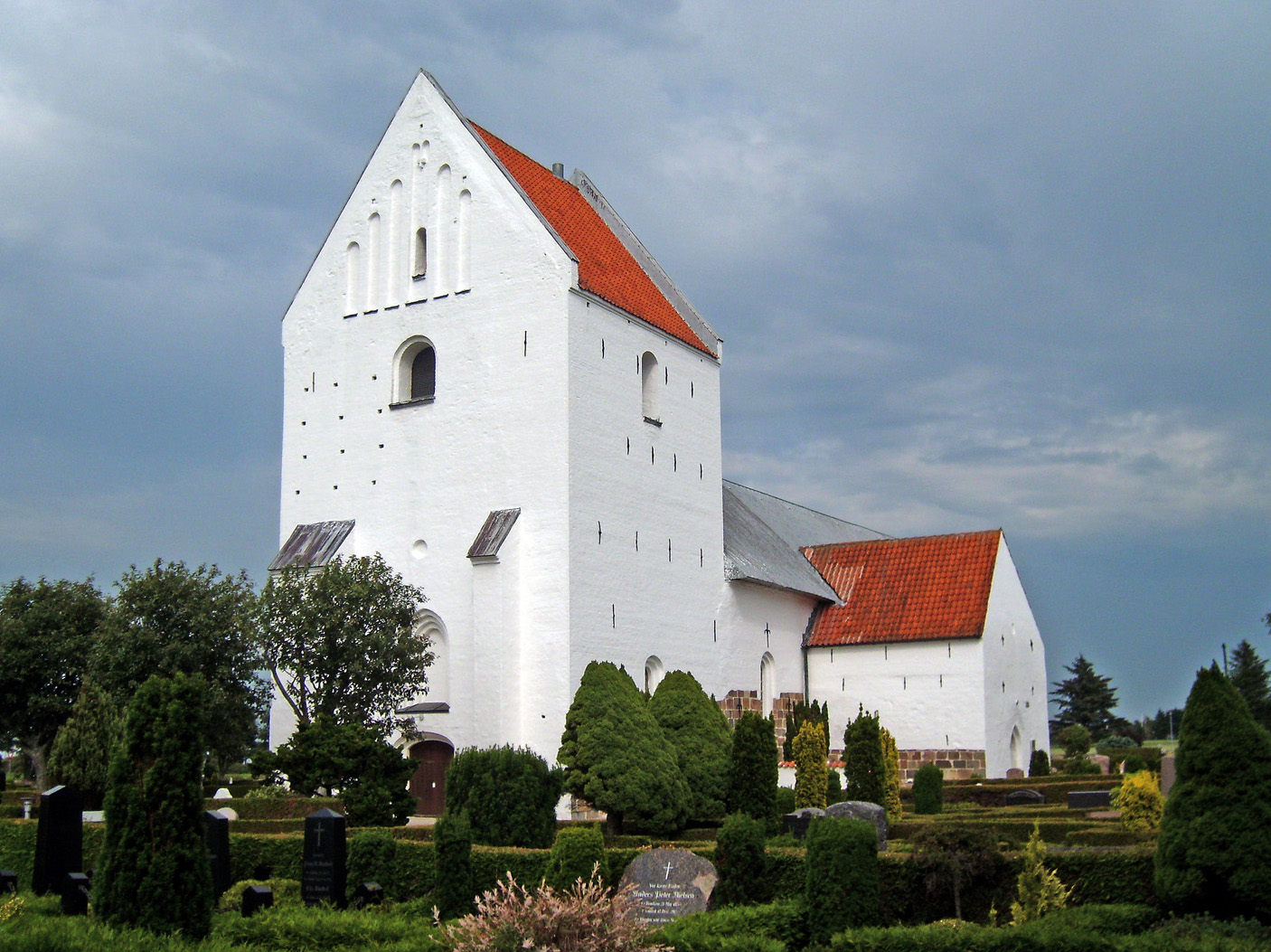
- Saltum Church

- Location in the North Jutland Region
- Coordinates: 57°16′19″N 9°41′59″E
- Country: Denmark
- Region: North Jutland
- Municipality: Jammerbugt

Population (2026)
  - Total: 694
- Time zone: UTC+1 (CET)
  - Summer (DST): UTC+2 (CEST)

Saltum is a village in North Jutland, Denmark. It is located in Jammerbugt Municipality.
