= Arentsminde =

- Village
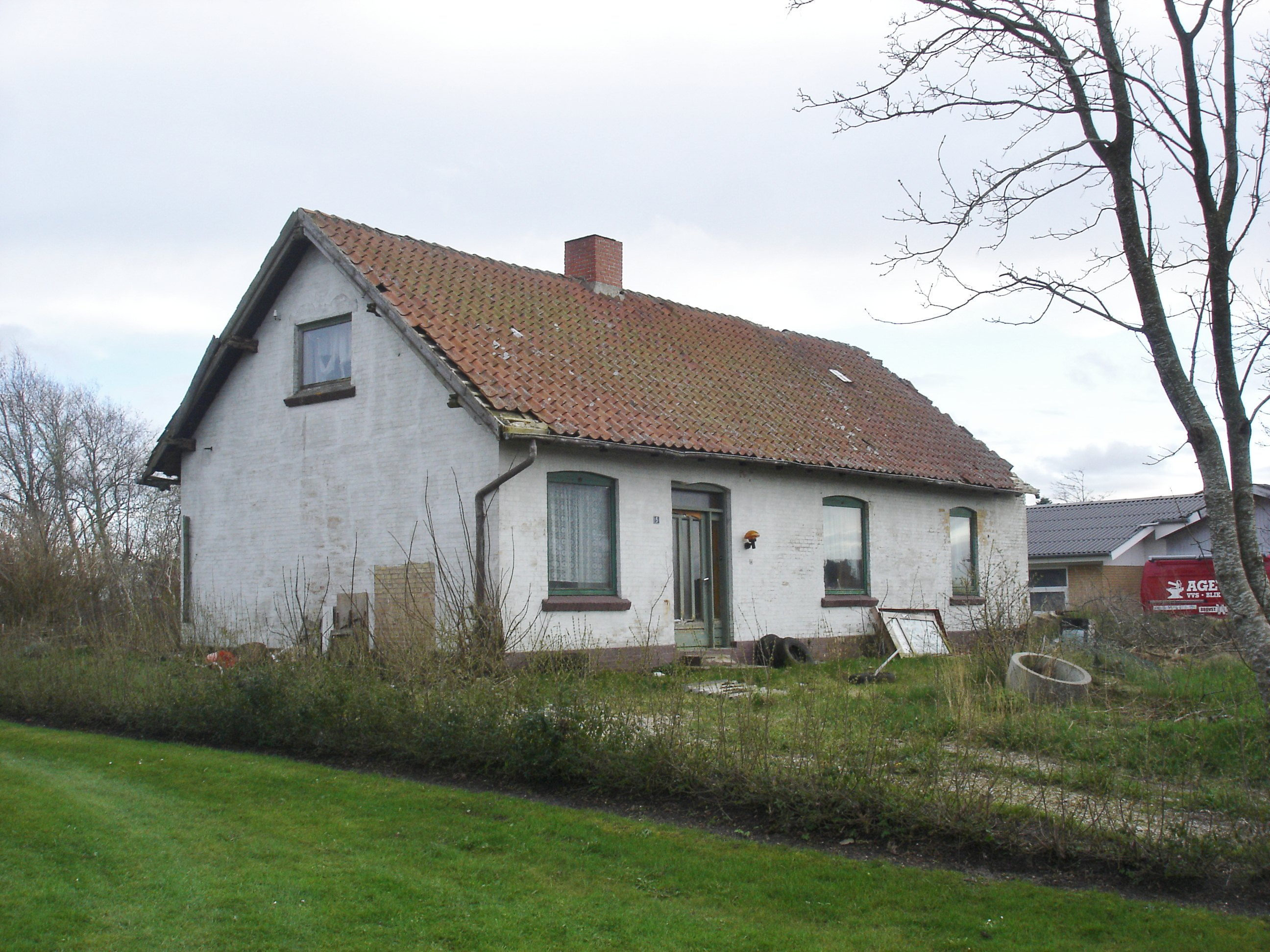
- The former Arentsminde Station

- Location in the North Jutland Region
- Coordinates: 57°7′21″N 9°37′32″E
- Country: Denmark
- Region: North Jutland
- Municipality: Jammerbugt

Population (2026)
  - Total: 397
- Time zone: UTC+1 (CET)
  - Summer (DST): UTC+2 (CEST)

Arentsminde is a village in North Jutland, Denmark. It is located in Jammerbugt Municipality.

== History ==
A train station was located in Arentsminde between 1897 and 1969. The station was built by Paul Severin Arved Paulsen and was a stop on the Fjerritslev-Nørresundby railroad.
