= Tranum =

- Village
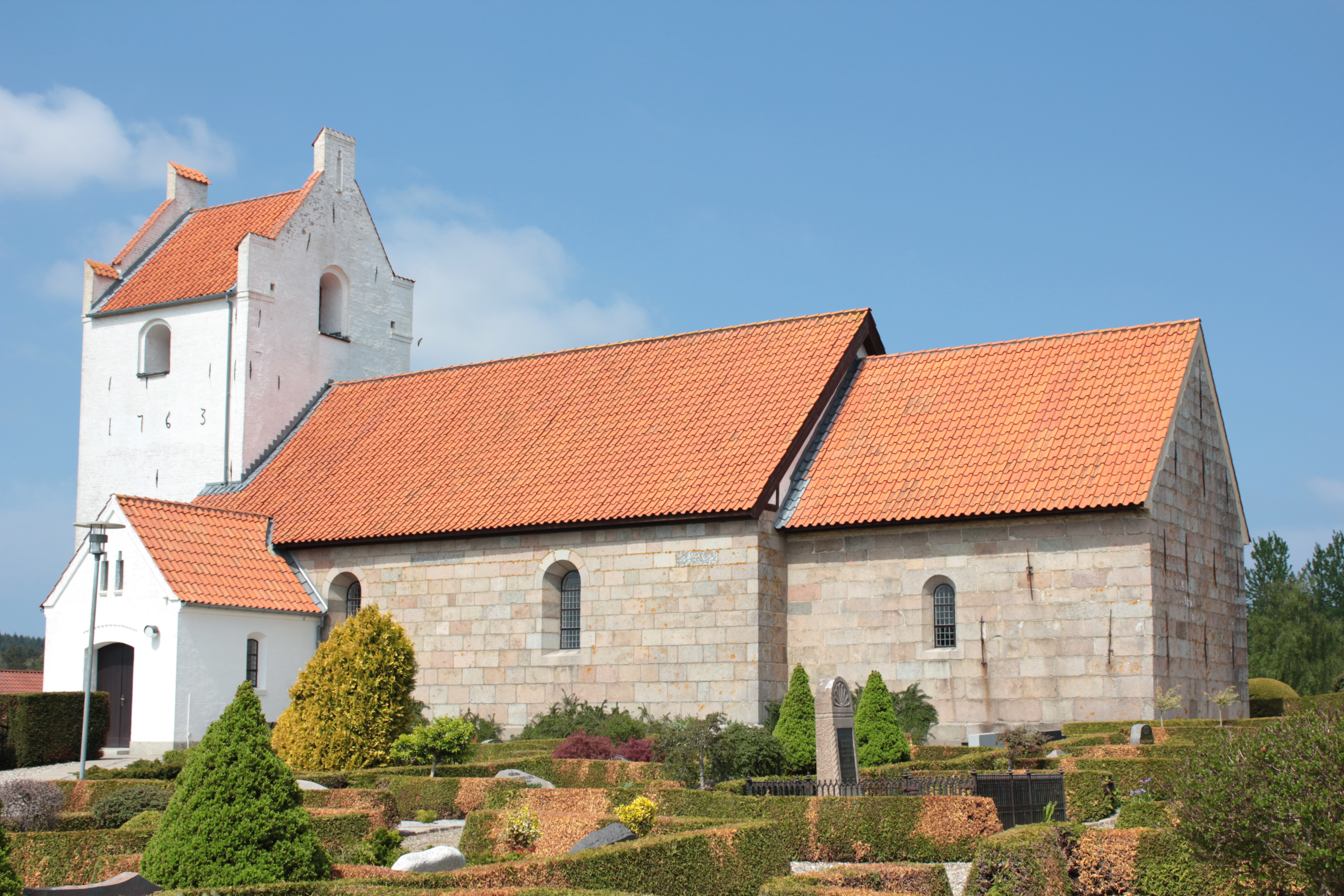
- Tranum Church

- Location in the North Jutland Region
- Coordinates: 57°7′57″N 9°28′1″E
- Country: Denmark
- Region: North Jutland
- Municipality: Jammerbugt

Population (2026)
  - Total: 438
- Time zone: UTC+1 (CET)
  - Summer (DST): UTC+2 (CEST)

Tranum is a village in North Jutland, Denmark. It is located in Jammerbugt Municipality.

== History ==
Tranum was first mentioned in 1471 as ”Trannum”, which originates from the bird, crane (trane in Danish) and the ending –um, which meant ”home”. The church of Tranum was built around 1200, whilst the tower was constructed in 1763.
