= Ingstrup =

- Village
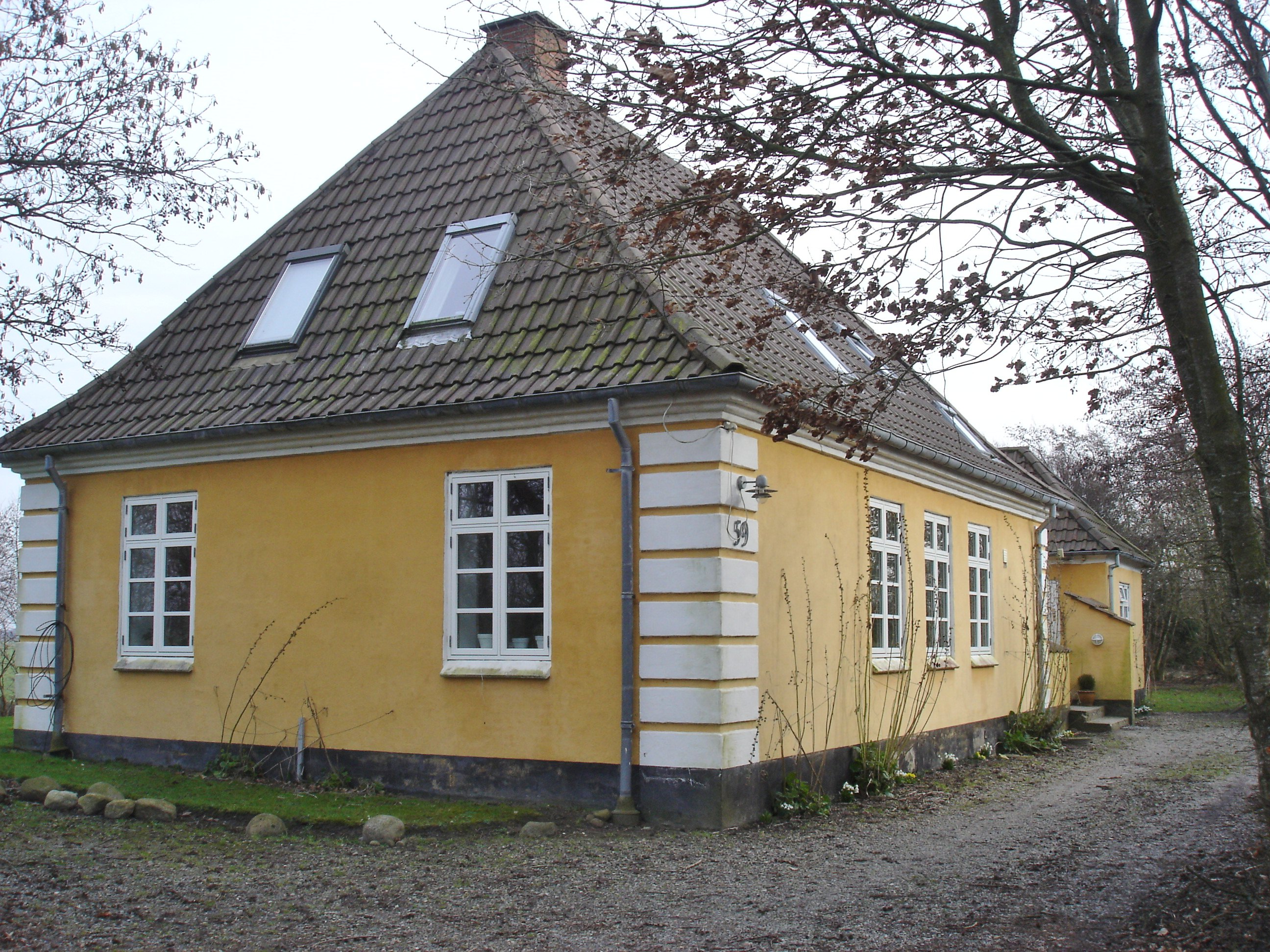
- The former Ingstrup Station

- Location in the North Jutland Region
- Coordinates: 57°18′51″N 9°42′33″E
- Country: Denmark
- Region: North Jutland
- Municipality: Jammerbugt

Population (2026)
  - Total: 338
- Time zone: UTC+1 (CET)
  - Summer (DST): UTC+2 (CEST)
- Website: Ingstrup.dk

Ingstrup is a village in North Jutland, Denmark. It is located in Jammerbugt Municipality.

== History ==
A train station was located in Ingstrup between 1913 and 1963. The station was built by Sylvius Knutzen and was a stop on the Hjørring-Løkken-Aabybro railroad.

== Notable residents ==
- Søren Reese (born 1993), football player
