= Nørhalne =

- Town
- Location in the North Jutland Region
- Coordinates: 57°9′12″N 9°52′35″E
- Country: Denmark
- Region: North Jutland
- Municipality: Jammerbugt

Area
  - Urban: 0.84 km^{2} (0.32 sq mi)

Population (2026)
  - Urban: 1,539
  - Urban density: 1,800/km^{2} (4,700/sq mi)
- Time zone: UTC+1 (CET)
  - Summer (DST): UTC+2 (CEST)

Nørhalne is a town in North Jutland, Denmark. It is located in Jammerbugt Municipality.
