= Biersted =

- Town
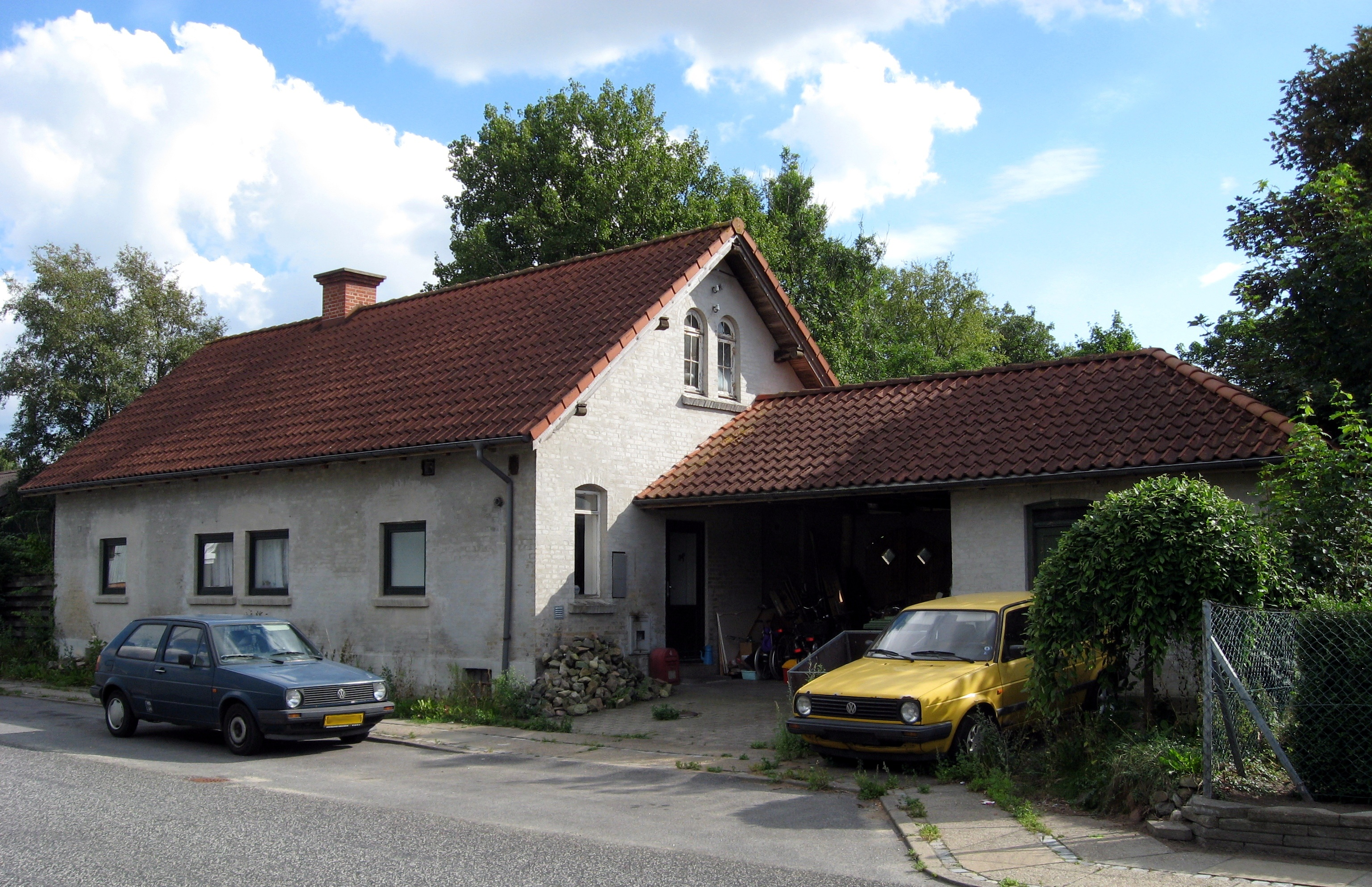
- The building of the former Biersted Station

- Location in Denmark Biersted (North Jutland Region)
- Coordinates: 57°8′48″N 9°48′17″E
- Country: Denmark
- Region: North Jutland
- Municipality: Jammerbugt

Area
  - Urban: 1.1 km^{2} (0.42 sq mi)

Population (2026)
  - Urban: 1,618
  - Urban density: 1,500/km^{2} (3,800/sq mi)
- Time zone: UTC+1 (CET)
  - Summer (DST): UTC+2 (CEST)
- Website: Biersted.net

Biersted is a town in North Jutland, Denmark. It is located in Jammerbugt Municipality.

== History ==
The town was originally named Bjergsted.

A train station was built in Biersted in 1896 by Paul Severin Arved Paulsen. The station was in use between 1897 and 1969. It was a stop on the Fjerritslev-Nørresundby railroad.
