= Fisherman (disambiguation) =

A fisherman is someone who captures fish and other animals from a body of water, or gathers shellfish

Fisherman, Fishermen or variants thereof may also refer to:

== Music ==
- The Fisherman, an orchestral composition by Bedrich Smetana (1824–1884)
- Fiskarena (The Fishermen) (VB 40), by Joseph Martin Kraus (1756–1792)
- The Fishermen, a band of Pete Finestone of Bad Religion
- "Fisherman", song by The Congos from Heart of the Congos 1977
- "Fisherman", song by Brian May
- "Fisherman", song by Yancey Boys from Sunset Blvd. 2013
- "Fisherman", song by The Iveys from album
- "Fisherman", a Trance DJ from the Netherlands

== Novels ==
- The Big Fisherman (book), a 1948 historical novel by Lloyd C. Douglas, the best-selling American book of 1948
- The Fisherman (novel), a 2016 horror novel by John Langan
- The Fishermen (Grigorovich novel) 1853
- The Fishermen (Kirk novel), 1928 novel, the best-selling Danish book of all time
- The Fishermen (Obioma novel) 2015

== Poems ==
- "Der Fischer (Goethe)" (The Fisherman), by Goethe
- "The Fisherman", a poem by Jane Wilde, influential on her son Oscar Wilde
- "The Fisherman", by William Butler Yeats
- "The Fisherman", by the Slovene Romantic poet France Prešeren
- "The Fisherman", by Abbie Farwell Brown
- "Yu Fu" or "The Fisherman", traditionally attributed to Qu Yuan

== Sculptures ==
- The Fisherman (Puerto Vallarta), Mexico
- The Fishermen (sculpture), Puerto Vallarta, Mexico
- The Fisherman, a relief at the pedestal of the Prešeren Monument (Ljubljana), Slovenia
- The Fisherman, part of Picasso's Regjeringskvartalet murals, Oslo, Norway

== Other uses ==
- Fisherman (American horse), an American racehorse
- Fisherman (English horse), an English racehorse
- Fisherman (comics), several DC Comics characters
- Fisherman, British Columbia, Canada, a ghost town
- Fisherman, a troop in the mobile game Clash Royale

== See also ==
- Fisherman Island (disambiguation)
- Dumuzid the Fisherman, a legendary Sumerian king of Uruk
