= Fisher =

Fisher is an archaic term for a fisherman, revived as gender-neutral.

Fisher, Fishers or The Fisher may also refer to:

== Places ==
=== Australia ===
- Division of Fisher, an electoral district in the Australian House of Representatives, in Queensland
- Electoral district of Fisher, a state electoral district in South Australia
- Fisher, Australian Capital Territory
- Fisher, Queensland, a suburb in the City of Mount Isa
- Fisher, South Australia, a locality
- Hundred of Fisher, a cadastral unit in South Australia

=== Canada ===
- Rural Municipality of Fisher
- Fisher (electoral district), a former provincial electoral division in Manitoba, Canada

=== United Kingdom ===
- Fisher Bank, a sea area of the UK shipping forecast

=== United States ===
- Fisher, Arkansas
- Fisher, Illinois
- Fisher, Louisiana
- Fisher, Minnesota
- Fisher, Missouri
- Fisher, Oregon, an unincorporated community
- Fisher, Pennsylvania
- Fisher, West Virginia, an unincorporated community
- Fisher Island, Florida
- Fishers, Indiana
- Fishers, New York
- Fishers Island, New York

==== Archaeological sites ====
- Fisher site, an archaeological site in Greene County, Pennsylvania
- Fisher Farm site, an archaeological site in the Centre County, Pennsylvania

== Law ==
- Fisher v. University of Texas (2013), a 2013 Supreme Court case
- Fisher v. University of Texas (2016), a 2016 Supreme Court case

== Organizations ==
- Fisher Body, a former automobile coachbuilder
- Max M. Fisher College of Business, part of the Ohio State University
- Fisher Communications
- Fisher F.C., a football club in England
- Fisher Electronics, a Sanyo subsidiary producing hi-fi equipment
  - The Fisher (electronics manufacturer), a line of electronics marketed by Avery Fisher and predecessor to Fisher Electronics
- Fisher House Foundation, an organization funding the construction of family lodging facilities near military hospitals

== People ==
- Fisher (surname), an English surname
- Fisher Brewer, American reporter
- Fisher (musician), Australian house music producer
- Fisher Ames (1758–1808), American politician
- Fisher A. Blocksom (1782–1876), American politician and lawyer from Ohio
- Fisher Stevens (born 1963), American actor, director, producer and writer
- Sergey Golovkin (1959–1996), Russian serial killer known as "The Fisher"
- Fisher Longstreth (1896-1972), American rancher,gunfighter and soldier

== Science and mathematics ==
- Fisher meteorite of 1894, which landed in Minnesota, United States (see meteorite falls)
- Fisher's exact test, a statistical significance test
- Fisher's method, also known as Fisher's combined probability test
- Fisher equation, in financial mathematics and economics, concerning interest rates
- Fisher transformation, a transformation in statistics used to test some hypotheses

== Other uses ==
- Fisher (animal) (Pekania pennanti), a North American mustelid
- Fisher (band), a rock band featuring Kathy Fisher as lead singer
- Fisher (comic strip), a Canadian comic strip by Philip Street
- Fisher (yachts), motorsailers first built in the 1970s
- "Fisherrr", song by Cash Cobain and Bay Swag
- "The Fisher (poem)", 1898 poem by Roderic Quinn

== See also ==
- Fisher Island (disambiguation)
- Fisherman (disambiguation)
- Fishery
- Kingfisher
