= Klitgaard =

Klitgaard is a Danish surname, referring to a farm ('gaard') in a dune ('klit'). As a place name, it is found in several locations in Northern Jutland. As a family name or surname it may refer to:

- Christen Klitgaard (1894–1961), Danish actor
- Georgina Klitgaard (1893–1977), American painter
- Kasper Klitgaard (born 1979), Danish handball player
- Mogens Klitgaard (1906–1945), Danish novelist
- Olaf Klitgaard Poulsen (1914–2007), Danish rower
- Peter Kurrild-Klitgaard (born 1966), Danish political scientist
- Robert Klitgaard (born 1947), American academic
