= The Sirens and Ulysses =

1837 painting by William Etty

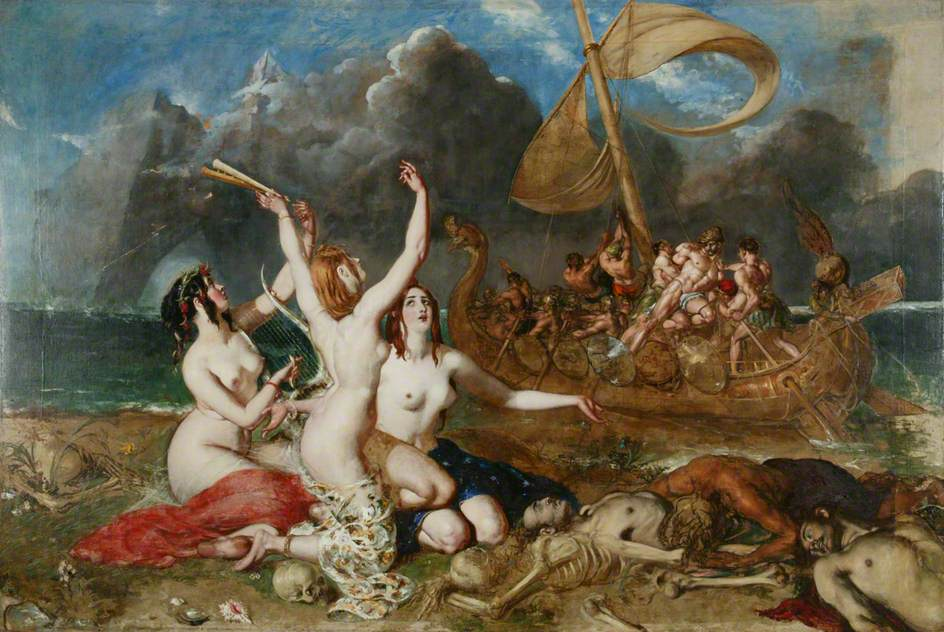
The Sirens and Ulysses, 1837, 442.5 by 297 cm (14 ft 6.2 in by 9 ft 8.9 in)

The Sirens and Ulysses is a large oil painting on canvas by the English artist William Etty, first exhibited in 1837. It depicts the scene from Homer's Odyssey in which Ulysses (Odysseus) resists the bewitching song of the sirens by having his ship's crew tie him up, while they are ordered to block their own ears to prevent themselves from hearing the song.

While traditionally the sirens had been depicted as human–animal chimeras, Etty portrayed them as naked young women, on an island strewn with corpses in varying states of decay. The painting divided opinion at the time of its first exhibition, with some critics greatly admiring it while others derided it as tasteless and unpleasant. Possibly owing to its unusually large size, 442.5 by 297 cm (14 ft 6.2 in by 9 ft 8.9 in), the work initially failed to sell, and was bought later that year at a bargain price by the Manchester merchant Daniel Grant. Grant died shortly afterwards, and his brother donated The Sirens and Ulysses to the Royal Manchester Institution.

The Sirens and Ulysses was painted using an experimental technique, which caused it to begin to deteriorate as soon as it was complete. It was shown in a major London exhibition of Etty's work in 1849 and at the 1857 Art Treasures Exhibition in Manchester, but was then considered in too poor a condition for continued public display and was placed in the gallery's archives. Restoration began on the work in 2003, and in 2010 the painting went on display in the Manchester Art Gallery, over 150 years after being consigned to storage.

== Background ==
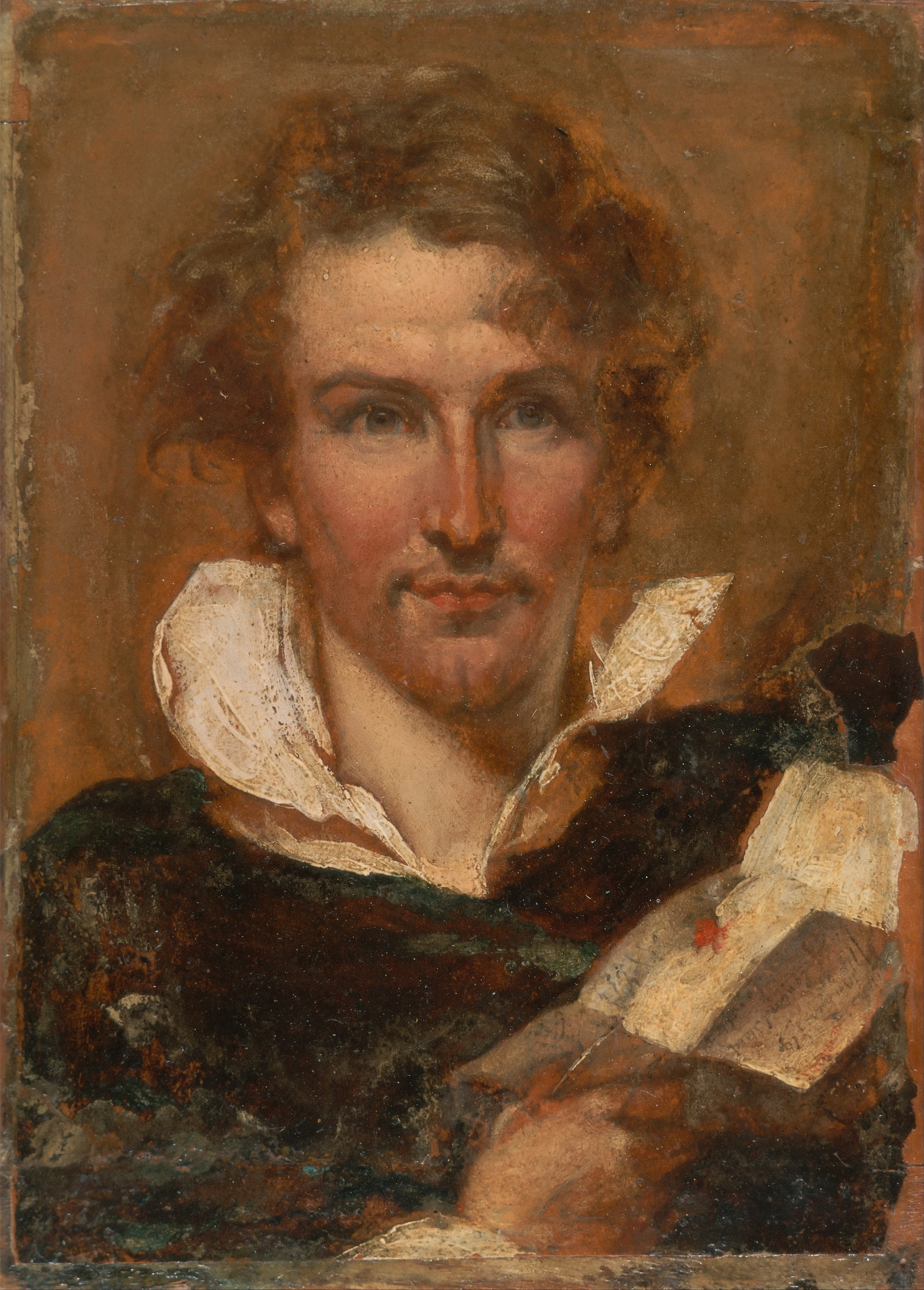
William Etty (self-portrait, 1823)

York-born William Etty (1787–1849) had originally been an apprentice printer in Hull, but on completing his apprenticeship at the age of 18 moved to London to become an artist. Strongly influenced by the works of Titian and Rubens, he became famous for painting nude figures in biblical, literary and mythological settings. While many of his peers greatly admired him and elected him a full Royal Academician in 1828, others condemned the content of his work as indecent.

Throughout his early career Etty was highly regarded by the wealthy lawyer Thomas Myers, who had been educated at Eton College and thus had a good knowledge of classical mythology. From 1832 onwards Myers regularly wrote to Etty to suggest potential subjects for paintings. Myers was convinced that there was a significant market for very large paintings, and encouraged Etty to make such works. (Note: Robinson (2007) believes Myers was mistaken in his belief that there was a significant market for large paintings of nude women. Art buyers were no longer primarily members of the landed aristocracy, but merchants who were less likely to have wall space available to hang very large works. This new class of buyer were also less likely to have separate rooms for male and female members of the household, and women were likely to object to large nude pictures in rooms used for entertaining guests.) In 1834, he suggested the theme of Ulysses ("Odysseus" in the original Greek) encountering the sirens, a scene from the Odyssey in which a ship's crew sails past the island home of the sirens. The sirens were famous for the beauty of their singing, which would lure sailors to their deaths. Ulysses wanted to hear their song, so had his crew lash him to the ship's mast under strict orders not to untie him, after which they blocked their ears until they were safely out of range of the island.

The topic of Ulysses encountering the sirens was well suited to Etty's taste; as he wrote at the time, "My aim in all my great pictures has been to paint some great moral on the heart ... the importance of resisting SENSUAL DELIGHTS". In his depiction of the scene, he probably worked from Alexander Pope's translation, "Their song is death, and makes destruction please. / Unblest the man whom music wins to stay / Nigh the curs'd shore, and listen to the lay ... In verdant meads they sport, and wide around / Lie human bones that whiten all the ground. / The ground polluted floats with human gore / And human carnage taints the dreadful shore."

== Composition and reception ==
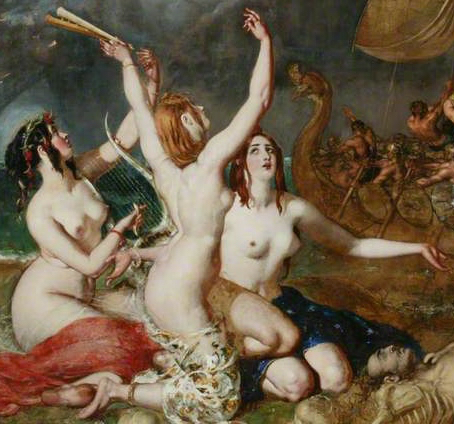
The sirens are similar in appearance, and the painting probably depicts the same model in three different poses.

The Sirens and Ulysses shows three sirens singing on an island, surrounded by the rotting corpses of dead sailors. Ulysses is visible in the background tied to the mast of his ship, while dark clouds rise in the background.

Ulysses appears larger than his fellow sailors, while the sirens hold out their arms in traditional dramatic poses. The three sirens are very similar in appearance, and Etty's biographer Leonard Robinson believes it likely that Etty painted the same model in three different poses. Robinson considers their classical poses to be the result of Etty's lifelong attendance at the academy's Life Classes, where models were always in traditional poses, while former curator of York Art Gallery Richard Green considers their pose a tribute to the Nereids in Rubens's The Disembarkation at Marseilles, a work Etty is known to have admired and of which he made a copy in 1823.

The physical appearance of the sirens is not described in the Odyssey, and the traditional Greek representation of them was as bird-lion or bird-human chimeras. Etty rationalised the fully human appearance of his sirens by explaining that their forms became fully human once out of the sea, an approach followed by a number of later painters of the subject.

Etty put a great deal of effort into the painting, including visiting a mortuary to sketch the models for the dead and decaying bodies on the sirens' island. His use of real corpses became publicly known, causing complaints from some critics. Although he visited Brighton in 1836 to make studies of the sea in connection with the painting, Etty had little experience of landscape and seascape painting, and the painting of the sea and clouds is rudimentary in comparison with the rest of the work.

The painting was Etty's largest work to that time, measuring 442.5 by 297 cm (14 ft 6.2 in by 9 ft 8.9 in). The work was completed in 1837 and exhibited at the Royal Academy of Arts later that year, and hung in the Academy's new building at Trafalgar Square (now the National Gallery). The work, and Etty's methods in making it, divided opinion: The Gentleman's Magazine considered it "by far the finest [painting] that Mr. Etty has ever painted ... it is a historical work of the first class, and abounds with beauties of all kinds", while The Spectator described it as "a disgusting combination of voluptuousness and loathsome putridity—glowing in colour and wonderful in execution, but conceived in the worst possible taste".

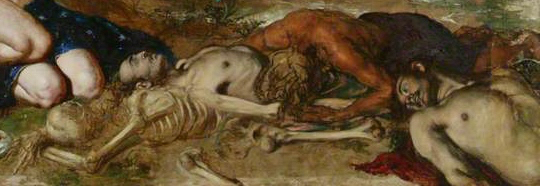
The bodies rotting on the sirens' island were drawn from actual corpses, offending some critics.

Possibly because of its size, The Sirens and Ulysses failed to sell at the 1837 Summer Exhibition. In October 1837 wealthy Manchester cotton merchant Daniel Grant, an admirer of Etty who had already commissioned Venus and her Doves from him, met Etty at Heaton Park races and offered to buy The Sirens and Ulysses and Etty's smaller Samson Betrayed by Delilah unseen for a total of £200. Etty was hoping for £400 for the two paintings, but on being told by Grant that his firm had lost £100,000 that year offered a price of £300 for the pair. Grant counter-offered £250 (about £24,000 in today's terms), which Etty refused. On leaving at the end of the evening, Grant suddenly said, "Will you take the money?", startling Etty, who in his surprise agreed. Grant died shortly afterwards, leaving the painting to his brother William, who in turn gave it to the Royal Manchester Institution in 1839.

Etty considered the painting to be his best work, insisting that it form the centrepiece of his 1849 Royal Society of Arts solo exhibition. The Royal Manchester Institution was concerned that the painting would be damaged if moved, refusing to allow it to be used in the exhibition until Etty, and a number of influential friends, visited Manchester to beg them to release it. Etty died later that year, and his work enjoyed a brief boom in popularity. Interest in him declined over time, and by the end of the 19th century, the cost of all his paintings had fallen below their original prices. As it was rarely exhibited, The Sirens and Ulysses had little influence on later artists, although it is credited as an influence on Frederic Leighton's 1858 The Fisherman and the Syren.

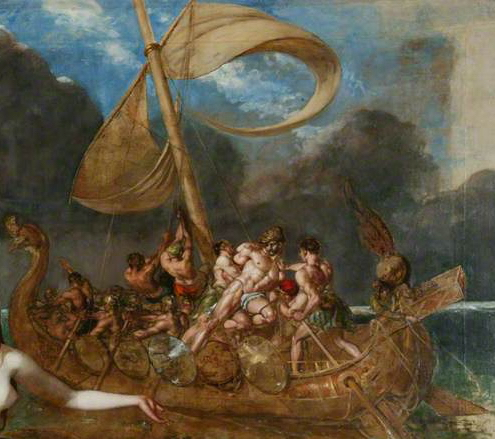
The bound Ulysses is shown as considerably larger than his crewmates.

Ulysses and the Sirens is one of those great efforts of my Art achieved in the vigour of my life, I can never make again.

— William Etty

== Removal and restoration ==
Etty had used experimental techniques to make The Sirens and Ulysses, using a strong glue as a paint stabiliser which caused the paint to dry hard and brittle, and to flake off once dry, a problem made worse by the painting's large size causing it to flex whenever it was moved. From the moment it was complete it began to deteriorate. After it was exhibited at the 1857 Art Treasures Exhibition it was considered in too poor a condition for public display, and it was placed in long-term storage in the archives of the Royal Manchester Institution and its successor, the Manchester Art Gallery. In the mid-20th century there were a number of unsuccessful attempts to repair The Sirens and Ulysses, but an attempt to clean the painting unintentionally damaged the paint further.

In 2003, Manchester Art Gallery staff determined that if conservation work were not undertaken, the painting would soon be beyond repair. The Esmée Fairbairn Foundation and AXA Art Insurance provided funding for the restoration. A replacement canvas to which the painting had been attached in the 1930s was removed. Following this, a mixture of isinglass adhesive and chalk was used to restore the surface of the painting, and the paint added during the earlier attempted restoration was removed. A new double layer of canvas was added to the back of the painting, and the three layers were glued together.

In 2006 the repaired painting was moved back from the conservation studios to the Manchester Art Gallery. The Gallery Nine section of the MAG was converted into a temporary studio, open to the public to watch the final retouching work until it was completed in 2010, and The Sirens and Ulysses currently hangs in Gallery Three.
