= Fisher cat (disambiguation) =

Fisher cat is a relative of the weasel. It may also refer to:

- New Hampshire Fisher Cats, a minor-league baseball team in the US
- Fishing cat, a wild cat found in Asia (Prionailurus viverrinus)

== See also ==
- Fisher (disambiguation)
- Swimming cat or Van cat, a landrace of domestic cat
