= Gjøl =

- Village
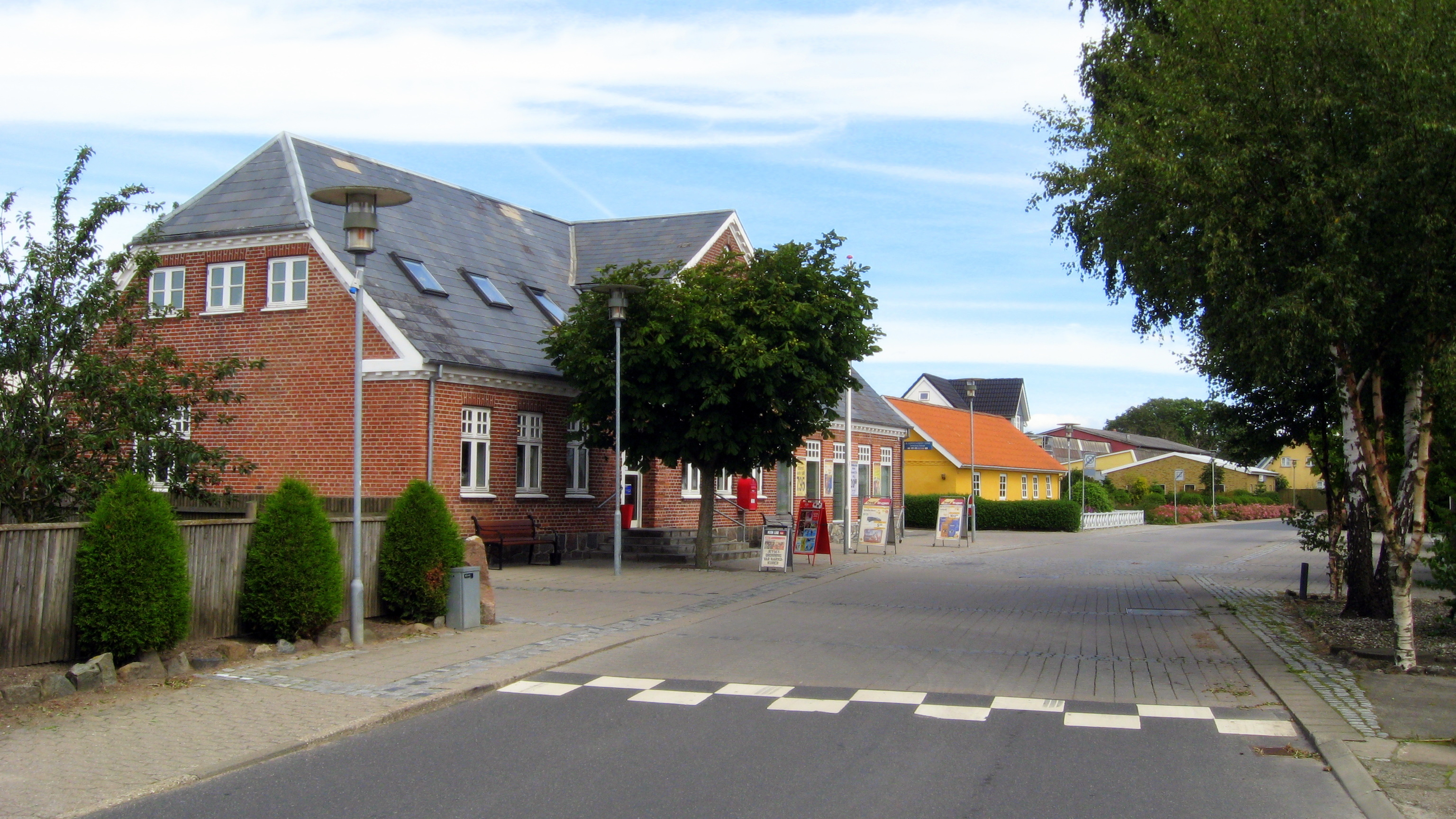
- Street in Gjøl

- Location in the North Jutland Region
- Coordinates: 57°4′4″N 9°43′1″E
- Country: Denmark
- Region: North Jutland
- Municipality: Jammerbugt

Population (2026)
  - Total: 910
- Time zone: UTC+1 (CET)
  - Summer (DST): UTC+2 (CEST)

Gjøl is a town on the north coast of the Limfjord in North Jutland, Denmark. It is located in Jammerbugt Municipality, 12 kilometres (7.5 mi) west of Aalborg, extending along the base of a glacial moraine. The shallow part of the fjord to the west of the ridge, Gjøl Bredning, is a wildlife preserve.

== History ==
The placename is first recorded in 1231 as Giol and is related to the word gul (yellow), a reference to the chalky cliffs of the moraine.

Until the early twentieth century, the site of the town was an island. Starting during the First World War, dams were constructed to create dry land from part of Gjøl Bredning and connect the island to the mainland, among them in 1914–1920 a 3-kilometre (1.9 mi) long dam connecting Gjøl to the neighbouring island of Øland.

Thomas Dam created the first troll dolls in Gjøl in the mid-1950s and the Dam Things company is still located in the town; in Denmark they are known as Gjøl trolls as well as Dam trolls. The town is also known for mink farms.

== Church ==
Gjøl Church was built around 1150 and has a Romanesque nave and choir and late Gothic tower. The doorways were originally richly decorated with carvings; the signature of master carver Goti is preserved. The choir was decorated with frescos in the 1530s. It is the main church of Gjøl Sogn (parish).

== In media ==
Hans Kirk's 1928 novel Fiskerne (The Fishermen) is based on the true story of a group of fishermen from the North Sea coast who moved to Gjøl and came into conflict with those who lived there. Kirk had a connection to the area through his father, and wrote the book while living at the old inn in the town, Gjøl Kro.
