= Hans Kirk =

Danish writer (1898–1962)

Hans Kirk (11 January 1898 – 16 June 1962) was a Danish lawyer, journalist and celebrated author, who penned the best-selling novel of all-time in his native Denmark, The Fishermen (1928). From 1926 to 1928, he was among the contributors of Kritisk Revy, an architecture magazine. Kirk was a long-time Communist Party member in Denmark and remained active until his death. In 1941, during the German occupation, Kirk and hundreds of others were arrested without charge by the Danish police in a sweep against communists and communist sympathizers. He was imprisoned and detained at the Danish prison camp of Horserød, but managed to escape in 1943, just in time to avoid deportation to the German death camps.

Hans Kirk's novels, which in addition to The Fishermen include The Day Laborers and The New Times, reflect Kirk's Marxist-influenced beliefs. His style is noted for subtle punctuation expressions. Perhaps the most striking is the absence of quotation marks, a practice that obscures the presence of narrator/author. Long dashes are used to mark a change of time and the organization of his novels do not use chapter headings, just blank spaces between paragraphs.

Although Hans Kirk was a prolific author - in his lifetime Kirk produced eight novels, as well as short stories, essays, and radio plays - he remains relatively unknown in the United States. With the recent translations of The Fishermen, The Day Laborers, The New Times, and The Slave by University of Iowa professor Marc Linder in 2000- 2001, Kirk's novels are now available for the first time in English.

== The Day Laborers and The New Times ==
The Day Laborers and The New Times chronicle the industrialization of an agrarian society in early 20th century Denmark. Unlike the characters in The Fishermen, the majority of the characters are not particularly religious. The novels were initially conceived of as being part of a trilogy, but Kirk's writing was interrupted by the Nazi occupation of Denmark in 1940. He was interned by the Danish police and later Gestapo as an enemy of Nazi Germany in 1941. He completed the manuscript for the third novel while interned, but it was discovered by the Nazis and destroyed. Despite subsequent attempts, Kirk never managed to fully reconstruct it.

== The Fishermen ==
The Fishermen tells the collective story of a northern Jutland rural fishing village in 1920's Denmark. It was the first collective novel to emerge in Denmark, breaking with the previous tradition of coming-of-age stories and is an excellent example of social realism. The village newest inhabitants are members of the Inner Mission (Indre Mission in Danish) puritanical revivalist movement, and refer to themselves as "the Pious", and their beliefs are often at odds with the less rigid Grundtvigian villagers. As the Pious adjust to life in their new village, they struggle with economic hardship and personal upheaval, while trusting that any and all outcomes are God's will. Kirk himself was an atheist; however, in writing The Fishermen, he wished to show the connection between religion, economics, and politics in rural life. Kirk attempted to understand rather than condemn the Pious movements popularity in rural Denmark, by examining how they made sense of their socioeconomic conditions outside of a political framework. His portrayal of the Pious can be read as deeply sympathetic.

The Fishermen was reworked eight times, before its final version. While Kirk's extensive revisions of The Fishermen was a process of choice; he would be forced to completely rewrite later works.

The Fishermen was adapted into a six-hour film by Danish state television.

== Selected works ==
A few of Hans Kirk's major works translated to English includes:

- The Fishermen ISBN 0-9673899-2-5
- The Slave ISBN 0-9673899-4-1
- The Day Laborers/New Times ISBN 0-9673899-6-8

Kirk wrote numerous other books and novels, but his legacy also comprise many articles and more than 450 short stories published in Danish tabloids. The tabloid short stories have a lighter tone and were often authored under pseudonym. He also experimented with children's books, an emerging genre in the 1920s in Denmark.

== Bibliography ==
The bibliography about Hans Kirk in English includes:

- Linder, Marc (2000). "Introduction". In Hans Kirk, The Fishermen (pp. v-xxiv). Iowa City, IA: Fanpihua Press.
- Linder, Marc (2002). God Tempers The Wind To The Shorn Lamb by Mogens Klitgaard. ISBN 0-9673899-8-4
