= Rescue of Stutthof victims in Denmark =

1945 rescue of concentration camp prisoners

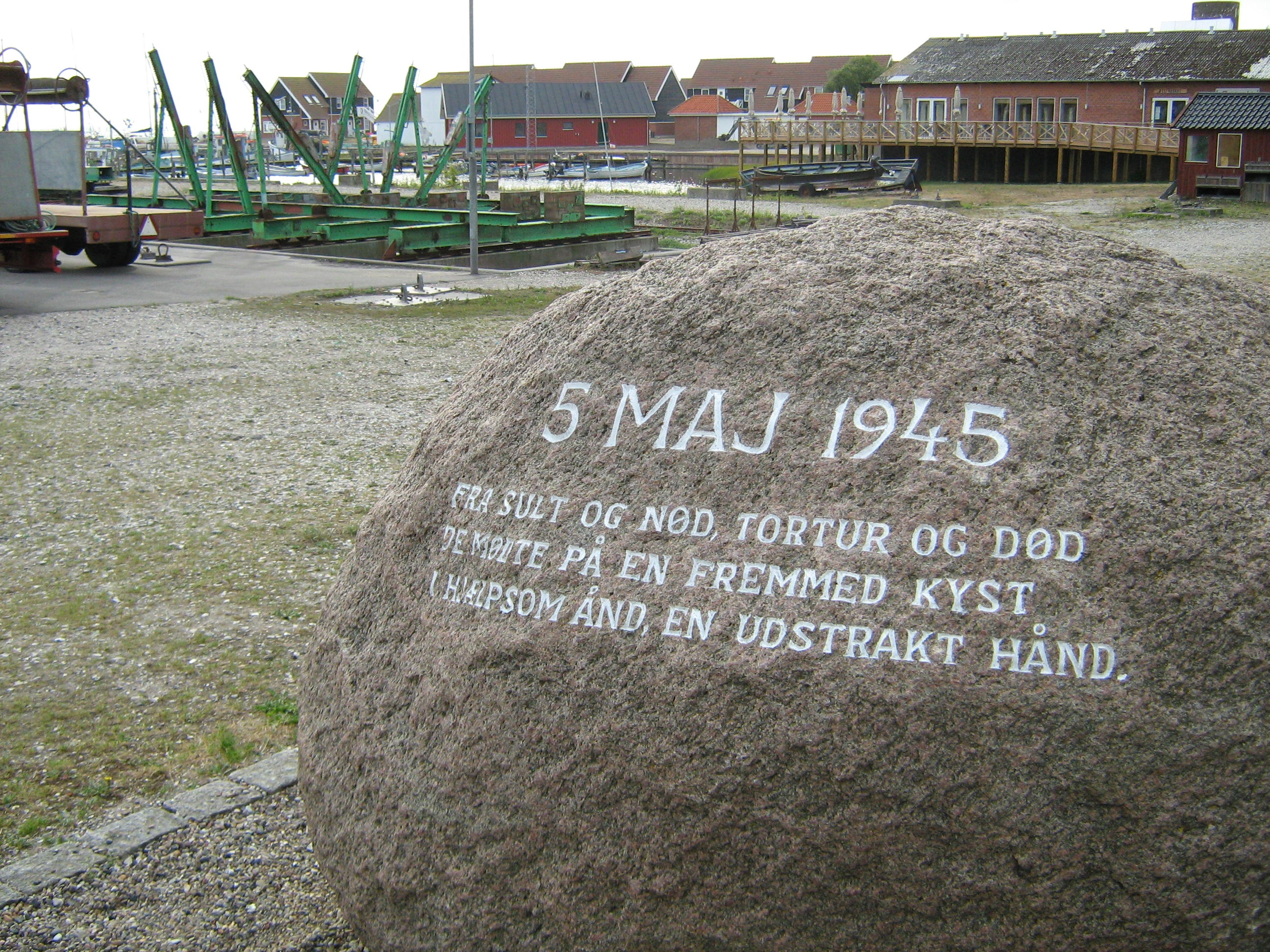
Memorial to Stutthof prisoners

The rescue of Stutthof victims in Denmark took place on 5 May 1945 at Klintholm Havn, a small fishing village on the south coast of the island of Møn, when a barge full of famished Nazi concentration camp prisoners was towed into harbour.

== The landing in Klintholm Havn ==
On 5 May 1945, the day Denmark was liberated from German occupation during World War II, a barge with 370 starving prisoners from the Stutthof concentration camp near Danzig (now Gdansk) was brought into Klintholm Havn. When Russian forces moved into the areas close to Stutthof on 25 April 1945, those in control of the concentration camp forced the remaining prisoners to march to the coast and then commanded them to board river barges. After a few days, they were taken ashore in Rügen, Germany, but then were again forced onto another barge on 3 May. This was allowed to drift across the Baltic Sea until it was finally towed into the harbour at Klintholm Havn by a German tug two days later.

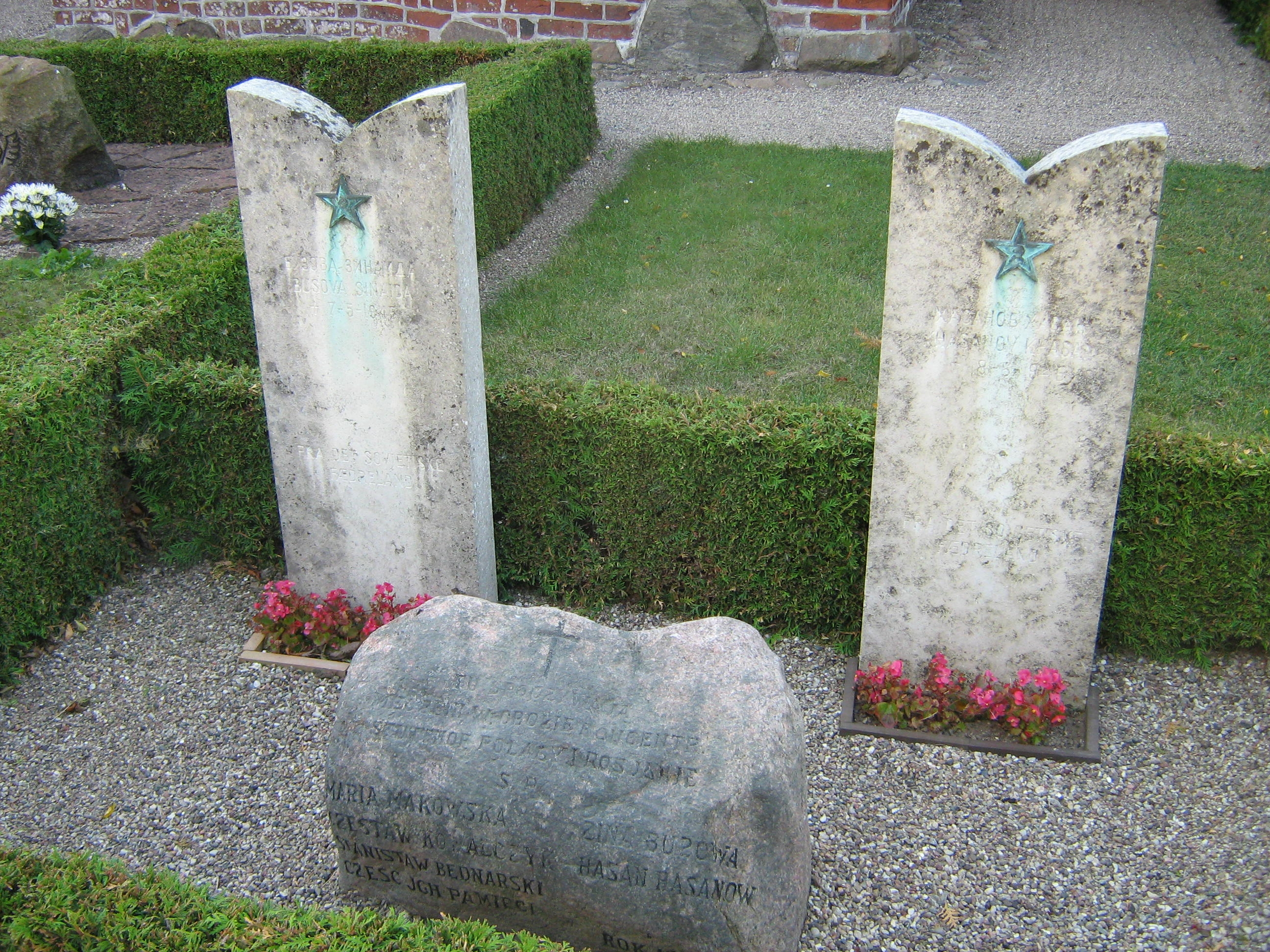
Prisoners' graves in Magleby churchyard

Fortunately the local inhabitants managed to rescue 351 of the prisoners. The other 19 could not be saved and died of disease or starvation during the next few days. Some of them are buried in nearby Magleby churchyard.

== Many different nationalities ==
The prisoners on the barge were nearly all political prisoners, most of whom had been involved in resistance operations. There were also several members of Jehovah's Witnesses which had been banned by the Nazi regime. Danish Red Cross archives, which draw on an analysis undertaken by Zygmunt Szatkowski (one of the prisoners), show that the majority of the prisoners were Poles followed by a large number of Russians. There were also small numbers of Czechoslovaks, Germans, Estonians, Latvians, Lithuanians, Turks and Frenchmen as well as a few citizens from the Free State of Danzig. One of the Poles had a U.S. passport.

== Danish assistance ==
Shortly after the barge was towed into the harbour, Rasmus Fenger, the local doctor, boarded the vessel and assessed the health of the prisoners. They were nearly all suffering from diseases such as dysentery, typhus, tuberculosis and the effects of malnutrition. In addition, they all had fleas. The top priority the first day was to find emergency food supplies for them all. Bread, milk and butter were found in the surrounding area and large quantities of fresh water were provided. A rescue committee was then set up consisting of members of the Red Cross and the Danish resistance movement. The most critically ill prisoners were moved to Stege hospital or to Hotel Søbad, a few hundred metres from the harbour. The remainder stayed on the barge for up to 10 days until accommodation could be found for them in community centres or hostels. The local Red Cross organised the rescue operation assisted by Danish doctors and nurses and by those prisoners who were fit enough to help. Within a few days, the spirits of the prisoners improved as they received nutrition and medical care.

== The memorial stone ==
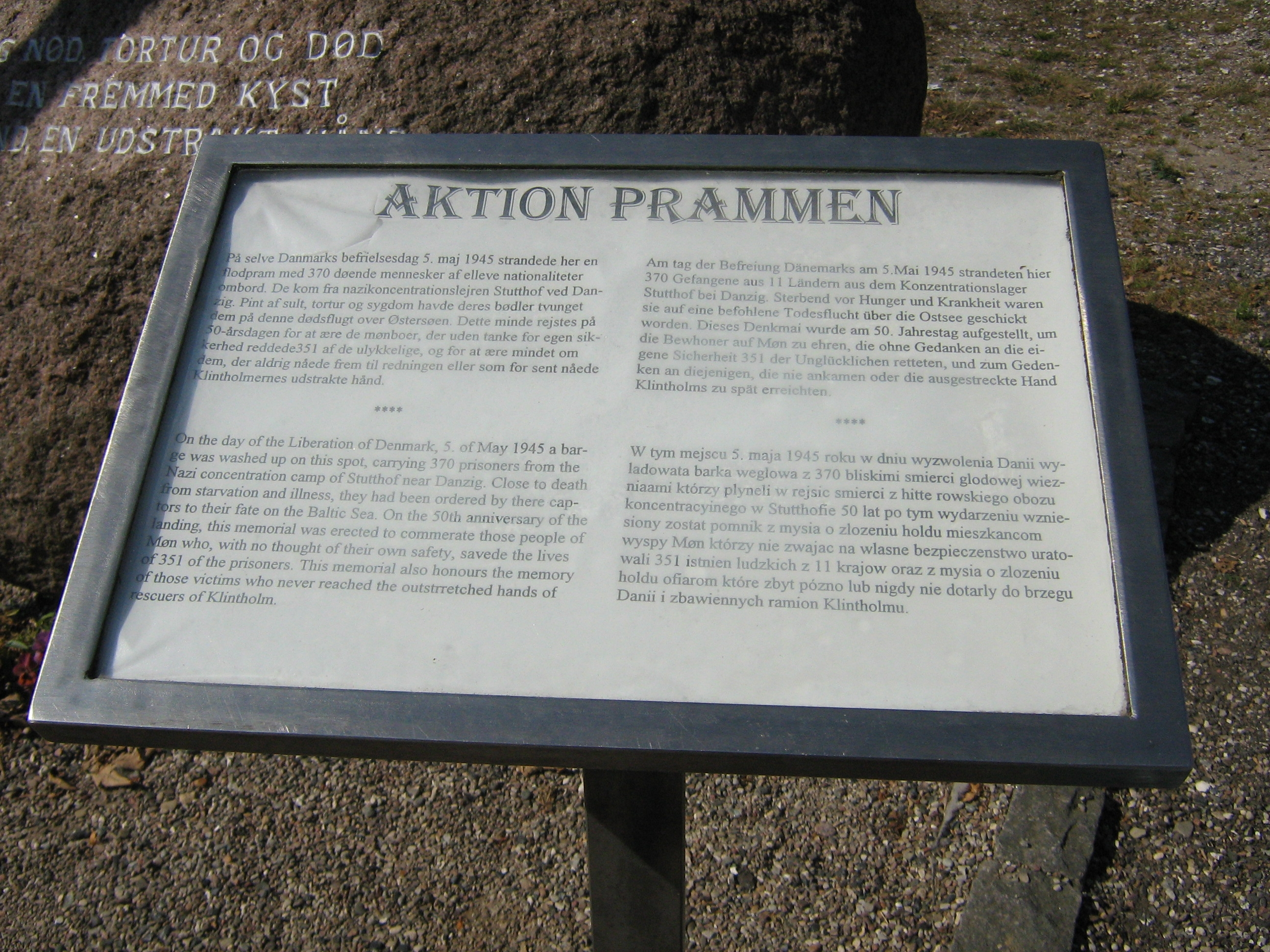
Board next to memorial

A memorial stone now stands on the shore of Klintholm Havn at the point where the barge came in. It was erected on 5 May 1995, commemorating the 50th anniversary of the event.

The Danish inscription on the stone reads:

Fra sult og nød, tortur og død
De mødte på en fremmed kyst
I hjælpsom ånd, en udstrakt hånd.

which, roughly translated, means:

From hunger and peril, torture and death,
They encountered on a foreign shore
In helping vein, an outstretched hand.

The board beside the stone carries explanations in four languages including English. The English reads:

On the day of the Liberation of Denmark, 5 May 1945, a barge was washed up on this spot, carrying 370 prisoners from the Nazi concentration camp of Stutthof near Danzig. Close to death from starvation and illness, they had been ordered by their captors to their fate on the Baltic Sea. On the 50th anniversary of the landing, this memorial was erected to commemorate those people who, with no thought for their own safety, saved the lives of 351 of the prisoners. This memorial also honours the memory of those victims who never reached the outstretched hands of the rescuers of Klintholm.

== A personal testimony ==
In her autobiography Unfettered Joy, Hermine Schmidt, a German woman who had been a prisoner at Stutthof because of her religious beliefs as a member of Jehovah's Witnesses, tells her own story of the desperate voyage across the Baltic Sea.

She recounts how on 25 April 1945 she and 370 other inmates from Stutthof were pushed out into the Baltic in a derelict barge. For 10 days the barge drifted around the sea north of Germany and south of Denmark. But on the 10th day the vessel was sighted from a little Danish island. It was soon brought into Klitholm Havn harbour on Møn. The date was 5 May 1945, Denmark's liberation day.

"It was unbelievable how they welcomed us. We had lice and fleas and looked like walking skeletons but they came down to the harbour and hugged us. The following day you could read in the local paper: Go down to the harbour and see the floating coffin."

== A word of thanks ==
The following article, drafted by prisoners Szatkowski, Wysocki and Sister Hilda, appeared in Møn's local newspapers and in one national Danish paper between 25 and 30 May 2009:

"We thank you Danes for our lives. Thank you for the really heartfelt welcome you gave us unfortunate souls from Stutthof when we arrived after months or even years of suffering, culminating in 11 days of extreme peril. As a result of poor sanitation and terrible conditions, there was typhus on our ship. Disease spread terrifyingly among us, claiming many lives. Without food, we were driven through wind and storm until we landed happily on the little Danish island of Møn. Its inhabitants received us as if we were their own. You took care of us with real concern, you took the sick off the ship and did your very best for us. Our story is full of gratitude. Special thanks to the Red Cross which, under Mrs Mortensen's leadership, and all the time and strength she devoted to us, has given us back both spiritually and physically so much of what we missed in Stutthof. Just as warmly, we thank the doctors, especially Dr Fenger, Dr Mortensen and Miss Sønderskov, and all the others in Klintholm and the rest of Møn, even if unfortunately we can no longer remember all their names. This is our word of thanks. But it is in our hearts that our greatest gratitude will always be borne."

== Sources ==
The primary sources for details of the Klintholm rescue are to be found in Danish newspaper reports from May 1945. In his book Aktion Prammen (see Bibliography), Erik Haaest draws on reports from Nationaltidende, Møns Dagblad, Møns Social-Demokrat and Møns Folkeblad, all of which published several lengthy articles on the event. They include interviews with the prisoners and eye-witness accounts of conditions on the barge and in the temporary hospital at Hotel Søbad. Not all the accounts are in agreement on details of the journey from Stutthof, some referring to only one barge across the Baltic and most others to a transfer onto a second barge on Rügen some three days before the arrival in Klintholm. Most also refer to a German boat which finally towed them into harbour, some referring to an SS boat while others refer to a civil German tug.

== Bibliography ==
- Schmidt, Hermine: Unfettered joy - a survivor memoir. Translated from the German original by Ron and Ruth Ince and Gertrud Carabali and carefully revised by Gary Perkins, Gramma, Copenhagen, 2005, 221p. ISBN 87-990125-3-7.
- Erik Haaest: Aktion Prammen (The Barge Project), in Danish, Kertehuset, Copenhagen, 1995, 127p. ISBN 87-985235-1-1.
