= Fisher (yachts) =

Fisher motorsailers were designed by David Freeman and Gordon Wyatt and, starting in the 1970s, over 1,000 were built. There were four models, at lengths Fisher 25, 30, 31, 34, and 37 feet. All models had a trawler-style wheelhouse, which gave them the appearance of working boats. Additionally to the before mentioned models, there have also been a number of catamarans built and sold under the name Catfisher.

== Gallery ==
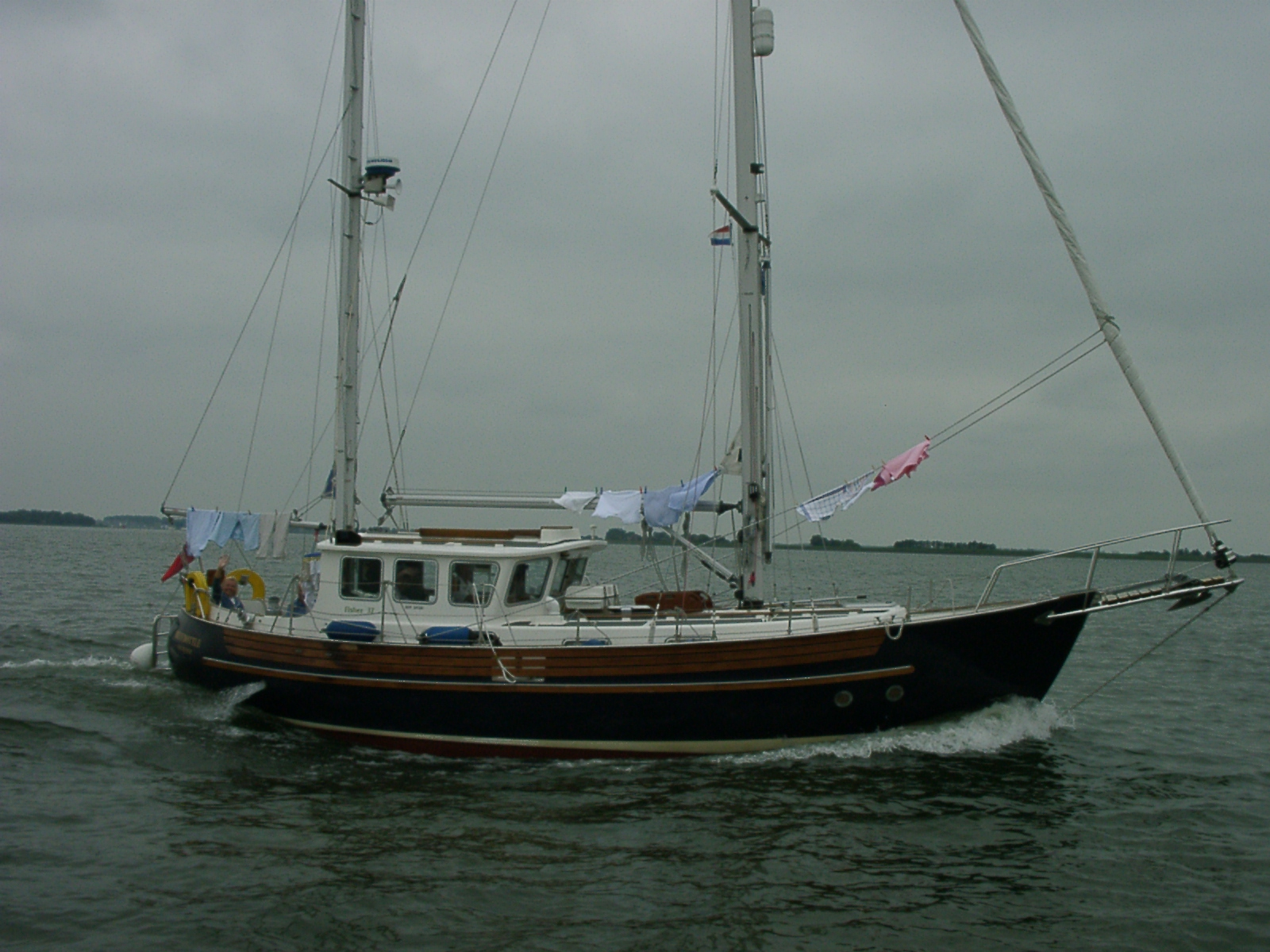
Fisher 37

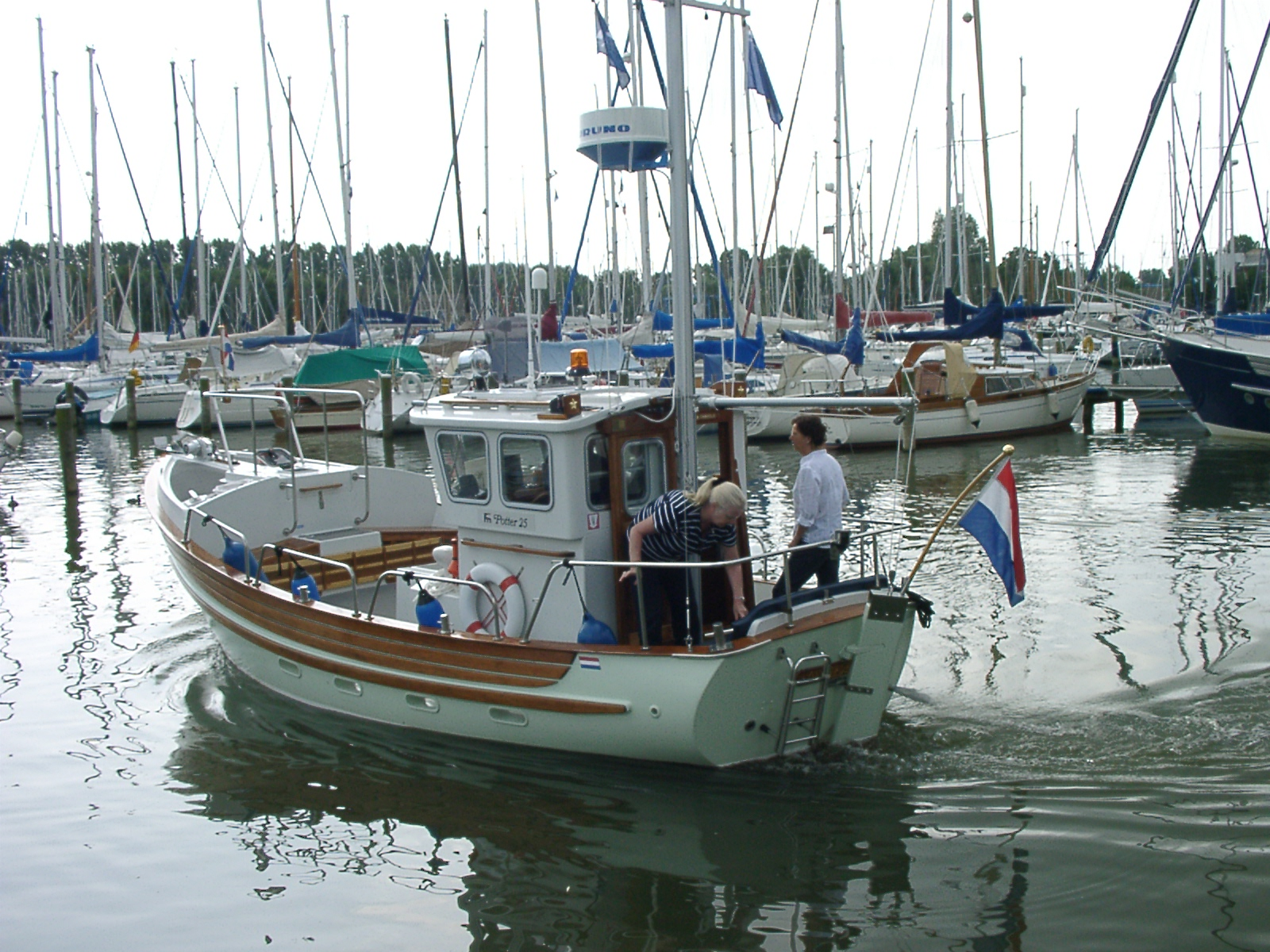
Fisher 25
