= Magleby Church =

Coordinates: 54.9843°N 12.4843°E

- Magleby Kirke
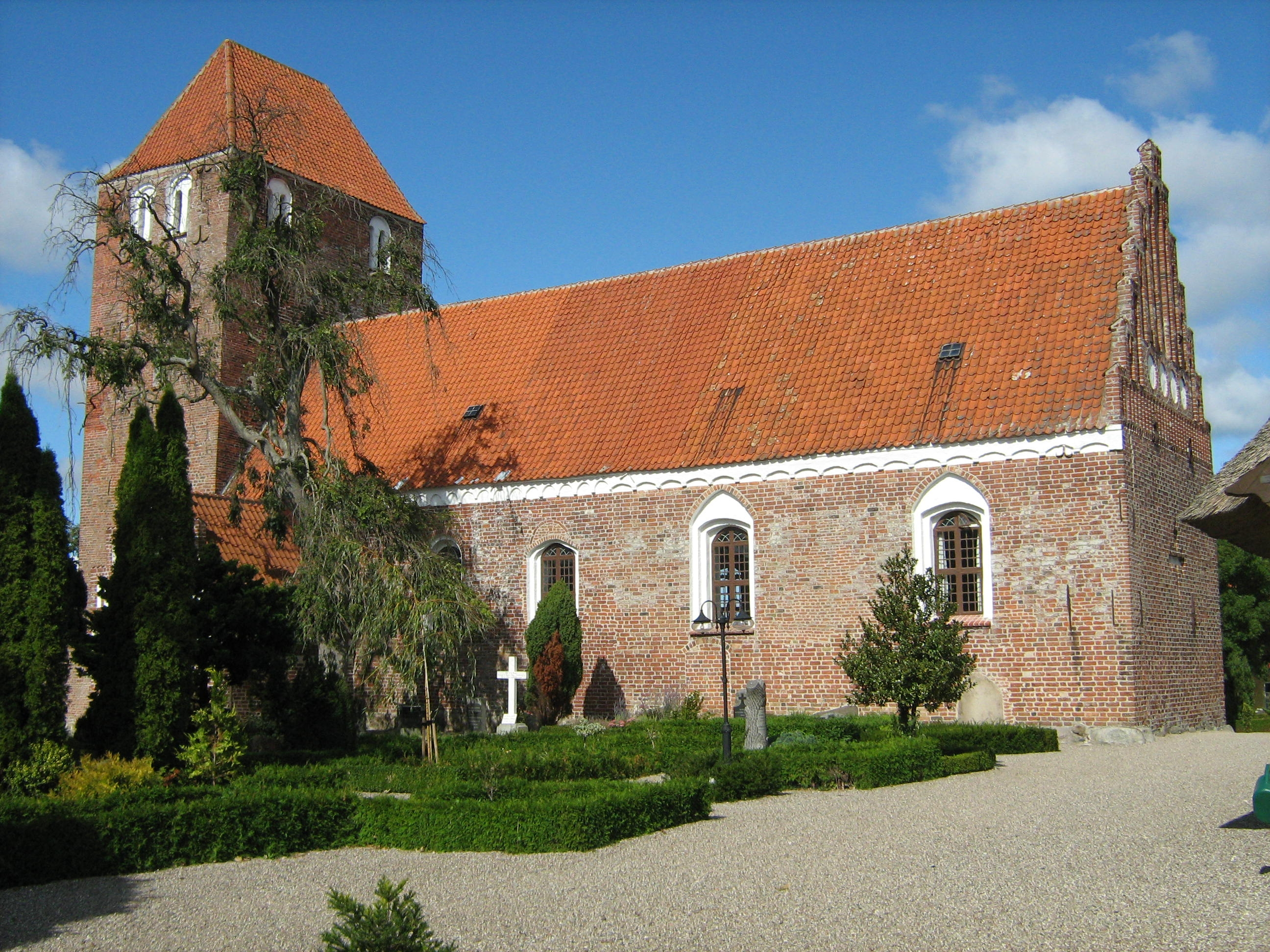
- Magleby Church
- Location: Magleby, Møn
- Country: Denmark
- Denomination: Church of Denmark

Architecture
- Style: Romanesque architecture, Gothic architecture
- Years built: 13th century

Administration
- Diocese: Diocese of Roskilde
- Deanery: Stege-Vordingborg Provsti
- Parish: Magleby Sogn

Magleby Church (Magleby Kirke) is located in the village of Magleby in the east of the island of Møn in south-eastern Denmark.

== History ==
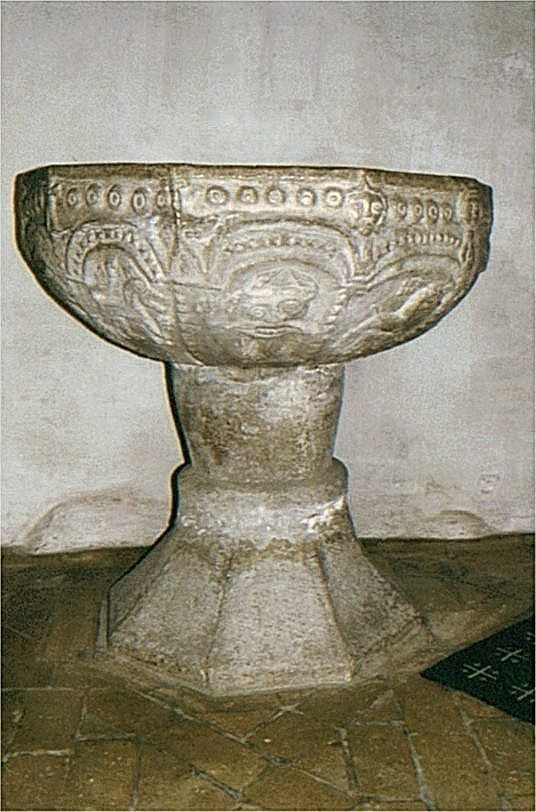
Magleby Church baptismal font

The church was originally built in the Romanesque style in the second half of the 13th century. The rounded tops of bricked-in windows from this period can still be seen on either side of the nave. In the 15th and 16th centuries, the church was converted to the Gothic style with cross vaults, Gothic windows and a number of additions and extensions. The tower which dates back to the older parts of the church originally had a twin top but was later covered with a roof.

The crucifix is believed to date from the 15th century. The Renaissance altarpiece is from 1598 and is attributed to Abel Schrøder (c. 1602–1676). The pulpit is oak from 1859. The Gothic baptismal font is of limestone, while the baptismal basin of brass is from southern Germany from about 1550-1575.

In 2020, Mette Frederiksen the Prime Minister of Denmark married her boyfriend at the church.

== Stutthof memorial ==
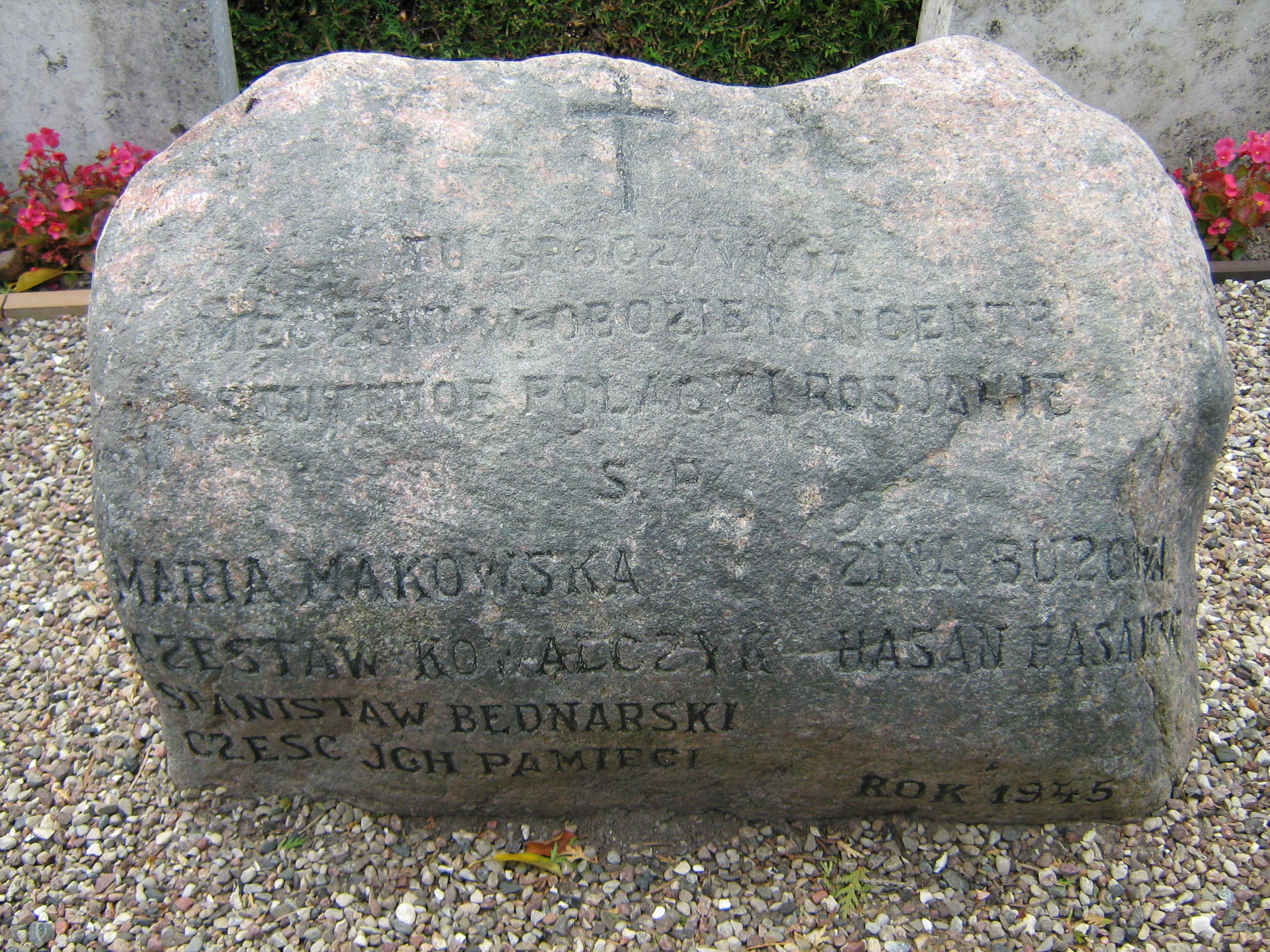
Stutthof memorial stone in Magleby churchyard

In the churchyard, the graves of Russian and Polish prisoners from the Stutthof concentration camp can be seen. They died in May 1945 shortly after arriving in Denmark on an old river barge with 351 others who survived the ordeal.

== Other sources ==
- Henning Dehn-Nielsen (1988) Kirker og Klostre i Danmark (Forlag Danmark, Lademann) ISBN 87-11-13937-4
