= Horserød camp =

Open state prison in Horserød, Denmark

Statsfængslet ved Horserød
- Interactive map of Statsfængslet ved Horserød
- Location: Horserød, Helsingør; 56.045494°N 12.49449°E
- Status: Operational
- Security class: Open state prison
- Capacity: 251
- Opened: 1917 (Prison camp); 1946 (State prison)
- Managed by: Correctional Service of Denmark
- Website: Official Website

Horserød Camp (also Horserød State Prison, Danish: Horserødlejren or Horserød Statsfængsel) is an open state prison at Horserød, Denmark located in North Zealand, approximately seven kilometers from Helsingør. Built in 1917, Horserød was originally a prison camp, and in local parlance the site is still referred to as Horserødlejren (The Horserød Camp).

== History ==
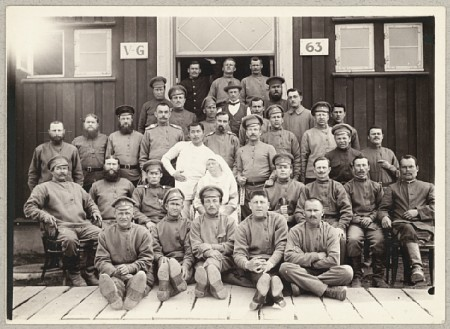
Russian prisoners of war at Horserød camp

The camp originally consisted of approximately 75 wooden barracks and was built in 1917 to confine Russian prisoners of war who were transferred from Germany and the Eastern front during the First World War. After the war, the camp housed various kinds of refugees, and at one point was converted to a summer camp for school children from the slums of Copenhagen.

=== World War II ===
Between 19 April 1940 and 2 August 1941, 80 German immigrants were detained in groups in Horserød camp before being sent back to Germany. A court in Hamburg later sentenced 14 of them to capital punishment, while the rest were interned in Nazi concentration camps.

In Denmark, communists had long been surveilled and perceived as a threat to national security by the political establishment and on 22 June 1941, around 300 Danish members of the Communist Party of Denmark (DKP) were arrested by the Danish police. In Copenhagen they were detained at Vestre Prison without charges, and on the 20 August, 107 of the arrested men were sent from Vestre Prison to the Horserød camp, among them member of parliament Martin Nielsen. On 22 August 1941, the Danish parliament adopted the Anti-Communist Act with retroactive effect. On 29 August 1943, during the countrywide Operation Safari, the Germans captured the camp. In the attack, 95 prisoners managed to escape, while the remaining 150 were subsequently deported to the German Stutthof concentration camp. From around September that year, the German Gestapo began using Horserød to detain various Danish resistance members and Jews. Although Horserød camp was not officially described as a concentration camp, it had the same functions, but unlike the German concentration camps, it was not administered by the SS.

About 6,000 Jews successfully fled by boat from Denmark to Sweden in October 1943, but around 500 did not make it and were captured by German forces in their attempt. Of these, 250 were sent to the Horserød camp. On 13 October 1943, 175 imprisoned Jews from Horserød were deported by train to Theresienstadt. On 23 November 1943, another 16 Jews were deported by train to Ravensbrück (women and children) and Sachsenhausen (men), of whom 14 were later transferred to Theresienstadt. These train deportations of Jews from Denmark to Nazi concentration camps, were two out of a total of four during World War II. All in all, 472 Jews were deported by these four trains.

In 1944, when the Danish government created Frøslev Prison Camp, the inmates from Horserød were moved there. From April 1945, the Germans used Horserød camp as a military hospital for wounded German soldiers.

=== Post-war ===
From 15 August 1945 the camp was used for the internment of Danish traitors who had collaborated with Nazi Germany. The last of these was released in 1956. The Danish prison services took over Horserød camp in 1947.

The 22 June is now an annual day of remembrance held at a monument at the camp, commemorating the arresting and detention of Danish communists in 1941.

=== Present times ===
Horserød Camp has had many notable detainees throughout its long history. As an open prison in modern times, Danish politician Peter Brixtofte served a two-year sentence here from 6 August 2008. He published the book Mit Horserød (My Horserød) in 2009.

== Monument and museum ==
On the 22 June 1991, a monumental sculpture known as Håbets Port (Gate of Hope) commemorating the former communist prisoners was erected at the Horserød camp. The granite sculpture is made by Per Ulrich, with text inscriptions from Hans Kirk. Hans Kirk was among the detained communist prisoners in Horserød, but managed to escape in 1943. Per Ulrich was arrested for resistance activities in 1944 and after a short detention in Horserød he was deported to Frøslevlejren and eventually various prisons in Germany and both the Neuengamme and Sachsenhausen concentration camps, which he survived.

Since 2002, there is a small prison museum across the main entrance of the Horserød camp, exhibiting its history. It is known as Horserødlejrens Museum.

== Literature ==
- Nielsen, Martin (1948). Undervejs mod livet. Erindringer fra Vestre Fængsel og Horserødlejren under Danmarks besættelse (in Danish). Gyldendal. 142 pages.
- Nielsen, Martin (1949). Fængselsdage og fangenætter (in Danish). Forlaget Tiden (1. ed.). 176 pages. OCLC 464637662.
- Kirk, Hans (1967). Breve fra Horserød (in Danish). Børge Houmann.
- Brixtofte, Peter (2009). Mit Horserød (in Danish). People'sPress. 207 pages.

== See also ==
- Frøslev Prison Camp
