= Martin Nielsen (politician) =

Martin Nielsen (12 December 1900 in Gødvad – 1962), was a Danish politician, managing editor, member of parliament for the Communist Party of Denmark and Holocaust survivor. Before his election to the Danish parliament (Rigsdag) he was a dairyman and farmworker. Later in life he became a member of the Folketing and managing editor.

Martin Nielsen had a wife and a son.

== Internment ==
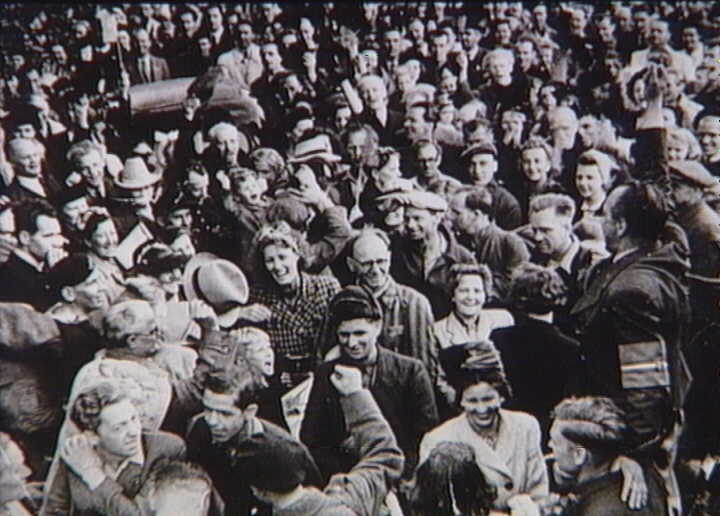
Danish Stutthof survivors returning to Copenhagen in June 1945. It is unknown if M. Nielsen is among them

On 22 June 1941, just hours after the commencement of Operation Barbarossa, Danish police arrested Martin Nielsen and around 300 other members of the Communist Party of Denmark (DKP). On the 20 August, he and 106 of the arrested men in Copenhagen were deported from Vestre Prison to the Horserød camp. In December 1942, the Danish authorities handed him and his file over to the Gestapo for interrogation.

On 29 August 1943, following the German dissolution of the Danish government, German occupation forces took command of the internment camp where the Danish authorities held Martin Nielsen.

On 2 October 1943, he was deported as part of a group of 150 communists to Stutthof concentration camp, on the ship Wartheland via Swinemünde and by cattle car.

On 25 January 1945, Nielsen was marched from Stutthof.

On 10 March 1945, he was liberated by the Red Army, which sent him (part of the way on foot) to Moscow, from where he was repatriated.

== Bibliography ==
- Nielsen, Martin (1945). Mennesker jeg mødte paa min Vej (in Danish). Nyt Bogforlag. 312 pages.
- Nielsen, Martin (1947). Rapport fra Stutthof [Report from Stutthof] (in Danish). Gyldendal. 170 pages.
- Nielsen, Martin (1948). Undervejs mod livet. Erindringer fra Vestre Fængsel og Horserødlejren under Danmarks besættelse (in Danish). Gyldendal. 142 pages.
- Nielsen, Martin (1949). Fængselsdage og fangenætter. Erindringer fra Vestre Fængsel og Horserødlejren under Danmarks besættelse (in Danish). Forlaget Tiden. 156 pages.
