= Fisher 25 =

1970s British motorsailer

Development
- Designer: Wyatt and Freeman
- Location: United Kingdom
- Year: 1974
- No. built: 255
- Builders: Fairways Marine; Northshore Yachts; Fisher Boat Company; Fisher Yachts International
- Role: Cruiser

Boat
- Displacement: 10,079 lb (4,572 kg)
- Draft: 3.71 ft (1.13 m)

Hull
- Type: monohull
- Construction: glassfibre
- LOA: 25.23 ft (7.69 m)
- LWL: 21.00 ft (6.40 m)
- Beam: 9.35 ft (2.85 m)
- Engine: Beta 27 hp (20 kW) diesel engine

Hull appendages
- Keel: long keel
- Ballast: 4,705 lb (2,134 kg)
- Rudder: transom-mounted rudder

Rig
- Rig type: Bermuda rig

Sails
- Sailplan: masthead sloop
- Total sail area: 276.00 sq ft (25.641 m^{2})

The Fisher 25 or Fisher 25 MS (for motorsailer) is a British pilothouse sailboat that was designed by Wyatt and Freeman as a cruiser and first built in 1974.

== Production ==
The design was previously built by Fairways Marine, Northshore Yachts and the Fisher Boat Company, all in the United Kingdom. Production started in 1974, 255 have been built and it remains in production by Fisher Yachts International.

== Design ==
The Fisher 25 is a recreational keelboat, built predominantly of glassfibre, with wood trim. It has a masthead sloop or optional ketch rig, a raked stem, an angled transom, a transom-hung rudder controlled by a wheel in the pilot house and a tiller in the cockpit, and a fixed long keel. It displaces 10,079 lb (4,572 kg) and carries 4,705 lb (2,134 kg) of iron ballast.

The boat has a draft of 3.71 ft (1.13 m) with the standard keel.

The boat has a Beta diesel engine of 27 hp (20 kW) for docking and maneuvering. The fuel tank holds 40 U.S. gallons (150 L; 33 imp gal) and the fresh water tank also has a capacity of 40 U.S. gallons (150 L; 33 imp gal).

The design has sleeping accommodation for five people, with a double "V"-berth in the bow cabin, an L-shaped settee with a drop-down table and a straight settee in the main cabin. The galley is located on the starboard side just forward of the companionway ladder. The galley is equipped with a two-burner stove and an ice box. The head is located just aft of the bow cabin on the port side. Cabin headroom is 72 in (180 cm).

The design has a hull speed of 6.1 kn (11.3 km/h).

== Operational history ==
The boat is supported by an active class club, the Fisher Owners Association.

In a 2010 review Steve Henkel wrote, "Northshore Yacht Yards in Itchenor, Sussex, England, (a company that bought the former builder, Fairways Fisher) builds this chubby 25-foot motorsailer. The design is now over 30 years old, and in those years more than 250 have been built. Options include either a sloop or the ketch rig shown here. She can be steered from a tiller in the aft cockpit, or from inside, in the comfort of the pilot house. Best features: her pilot house will be welcome in cold, clammy environs, Worst features: The sail area, only 210 sq. ft. measured with 100 percent foretriangle, is tiny ... Consequently, don't count on the sails to move this boat in less than 10 knots of breeze. Sailing in sunny weather, there's poor visibility from the cockpit, and if it's hot, it would be nice if the pilot house were equipped with an air conditioner."

A 2009 review in Yachting Monthly reported, "to date 255 of these stout little ships have been built. Perfect for a couple wanting an easily handled, take-anything cruiser, her bluff bows contain a spacious, two-berth cabin. The saloon is roomy with a generous galley to starboard and a dinette opposite. A Quarterberth provides either a seaberth or guest accommodation. The wheelhouse has good headroom and contains the navigation station. The cockpit is also a reasonable size but visibility forward is restricted. In light conditions and to windward, the rig provides stability but little more. But off the wind in Force 4 she potters along happily."
