= The Fisherman and the Syren =

Painting by Frederic Leighton

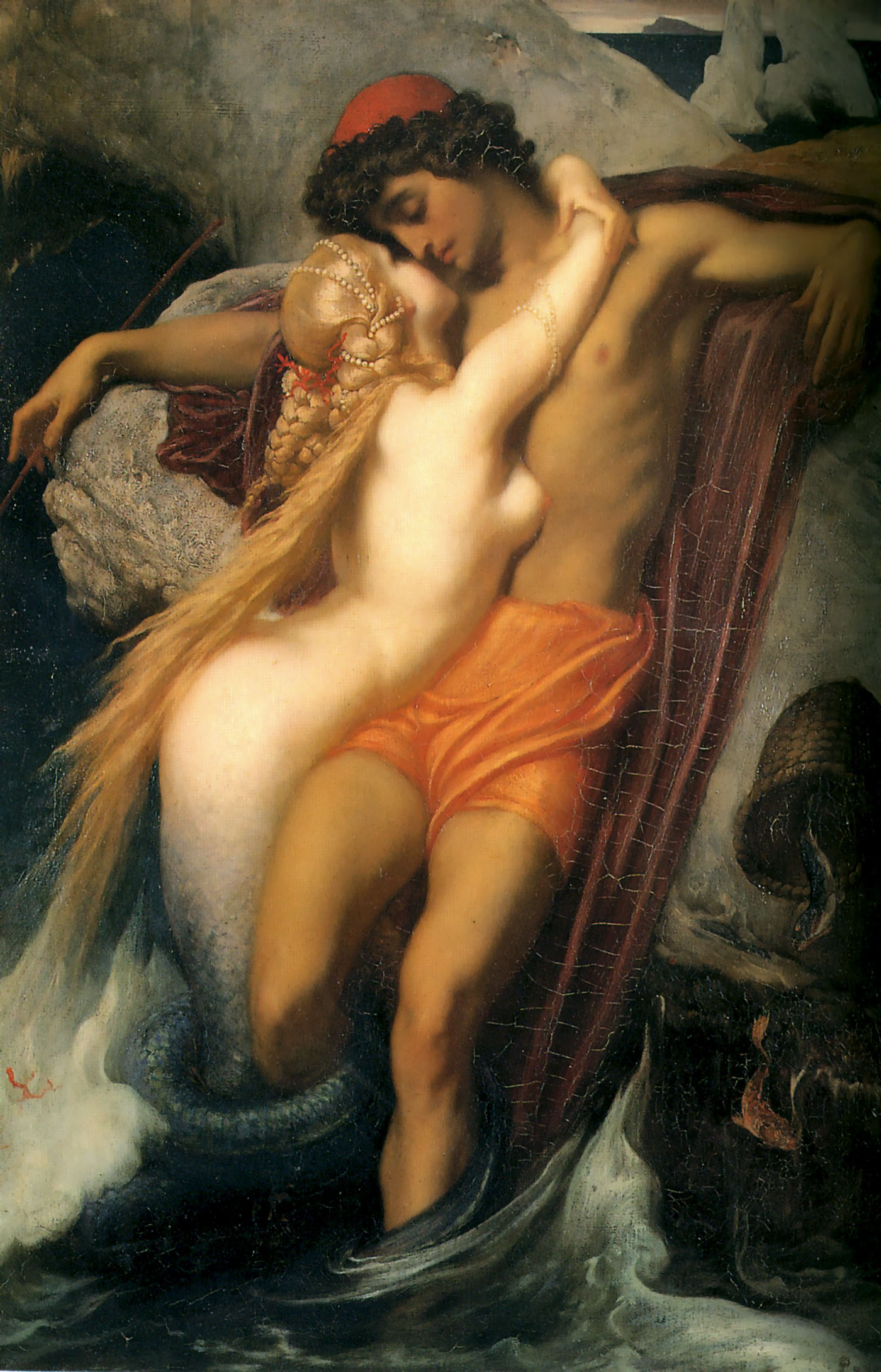
- Artist: Frederic Leighton
- Year: c. 1856–1858
- Medium: Oil on canvas
- Dimensions: 66.3 cm × 48.7 cm (26.1 in × 19.2 in)
- Location: Bristol Museum & Art Gallery

The Fisherman and the Syren is an oil painting by Frederic Leighton, first exhibited in 1858. It is a composition of two small full-length figures, a mermaid clasping a fisherman round the neck. The picture is in the collection of the Bristol Museum & Art Gallery.

== Description ==
The painting is a composition of two figures with rocks and the sea. A young Sicilian fisherman slipping asleep down a rock into the tide is grasped round the neck by a siren. He is swarthy in complexion, with dark curly hair and wears a loincloth. The siren is nude and blonde, and her long, wavy hair is laced with pearls.

The subject is taken from "Der Fischer", a ballad by Goethe written in 1779:

Half drew she him,
Half sunk he in,
And never more was seen.

== Analysis ==
According to Jones, et al., Leighton's literary pictures "suggest a preoccupation with women as destroyers", and The Fisherman and the Syren represents that theme "quite unequivocally". Leighton here explores the femme fatale archetype that became popular in Victorian art, notably in the work of the Symbolists. In 1861, in a letter to his father, Leighton explained that the picture was "as little naturalistic as anything could be".

== History ==
In 1858, Leighton was represented on the Royal Academy walls by two pictures: The Fisherman and the Syren, and The County Paris, accompanied by Friar Lawrence, comes to the house of the Capulets to claim his bride, both small canvases painted in Rome and in Paris.

The Fisherman and the Syren, which was painted for Signor Mario, the famous singer, initially received little friendly criticism, and the reception was generally mediocre. However, a positive review appeared in The Daily Telegraph:

The picture is not of any commanding size, nor does it relate any very exciting legend. The story is of the mystic Undine tinge, and with a shadowy semblance in it to that strange legend, current among the peasants of Southern Russia, of the "white Lady" with the long hair, who, with loving and languishing gestures, decoys the unwary into her fantastic skiff, then, pressing her baleful lips to theirs, folds them to her fell embrace, and drags them shrieking beneath the engulphing waves. The "Fisherman and Syren" of Mr. Leighton has something of this unreal, legendary fatality pervading it throughout. There is irresistible seductiveness on the one side, pusillanimous fondness on the other. That it is all over with the Fisherman, and that the Syren will have her wicked will of him to his destruction, is palpable. But it is not alone for the admirable manner in which the story is told that we commend this picture. The drawing is eruditely correct, most graceful, and most symmetrical. The Syren is a model of form in its most charming undulations. The Fisherman is a type of manly elegance. That Mr. Leighton understands, to its remotest substructure, the vital principle of the line of beauty, is pleasurably manifest. But there is evidence here even more pleasing that the painter, in the gift of a glowing imagination, and a refined ideality, in his mastery of the nobler parts of pictorial manipulation, is worthy to be reckoned among the glorious brotherhood of disciples of the Italian masters—of the Grand Old Men whose pictures, faded and time-worn as they are, in the National Gallery hard by, laugh to scorn the futile fripperies that depend for half their sheen on gilt frames and copal varnish. This young artist is one of Lanzi's and Vasari's men. He has plainly drunk long and eagerly at the Painter's Castaly: the fount of beauty and of grace that assuaged the thirst of those who painted the "Monna Lisa" and the "Belle Gardinière;" who modelled the "Horned Moses" and the "Slave;" who designed Peter's great Basilica, and the Ghiberti Gates at Florence.

The picture was shown again in the 1897 retrospective exhibition of Leighton's art. It was first entitled The Fisherman and Syren, and afterwards The Mermaid.

== Sources ==
- Ash, Russell (1995). Lord Leighton. London: Pavilion Books Limited. p. 10.
- Barrington, Russell (1906). The Life, Letters and Work of Frederic Leighton. Vol. 2. London: George Allen, Ruskin House. pp. 36–37, 62.
- Jones, Stephen; et al. (1996). Frederic Leighton, 1830–1896. Royal Academy of Arts, London: Harry N. Abrams, Inc. pp. 74, 110, 122, 165.
- Rhys, Ernest (1900). Frederic Lord Leighton: An Illustrated Record of his Life and Work. London: George Bell & Sons. pp. 16, 107, 122.
- Staley, Edgcumbe (1906). Lord Leighton of Stretton. London: The Walter Scott Publishing Co., Ltd. pp. 53–54.
- "Exhibition of the Royal Academy [Second Notice.]". The Daily Telegraph. 3 May 1858. pp. 5–6.
