= Kasper Klitgaard =

Danish handball player (born 1979)

Personal information
- Full name: Kasper Klitgaard
- Nationality: Danish (Denmark)
- Born: 24 March 1979 (age 47) Ramløse, Denmark
- Height: 177 cm (70 in)

Sport
- Sport: Handball
- Position: Left Winger
- Current club: Nordsjælland Håndbold
- Number: 22
National team
Years	Team	Apps	(Gls)
2004	Denmark	3	(1)

Kasper Klitgaard (born 24 March 1979) is a Danish former handballer. His last club was Danish Handball League side Nordsjælland Håndbold.

Klitgaard is noted for 3 appearances on the Danish national handball team.

Today he is the sporting director at Team Helsinge.
