= Fisher, Missouri =

Extinct hamlet in Missouri, U.S.

Coordinates: 39°33′39″N 93°36′26″W

Fisher is an extinct town in Carroll County, in the U.S. state of Missouri.

A post office called Fisher was established in 1896, and remained in operation until 1904. The origin of the name Fisher is uncertain.
