= Der Fischer =

1779 poem written by Johann Wolfgang von Goethe

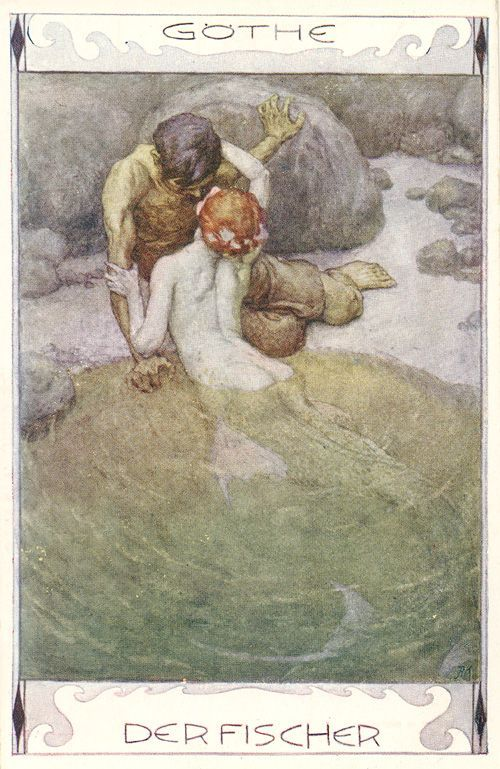
Illustration by Erich Schütz (c. 1920)

"Der Fischer" (English: "The Fisher") is a ballad by Goethe, written in 1779. Goethe's poem describes an exchange between a fisher and a mermaid who accuses him of luring her brood. As revenge, she enchants him with her song and pulls him into the water.

== Text ==
Das Wasser rauscht', das Wasser schwoll,
Ein Fischer saß daran,
Sah nach dem Angel ruhevoll,
Kühl bis ans Herz hinan.
Und wie er sitzt und wie er lauscht,
Teilt sich die Flut empor:
Aus dem bewegten Wasser rauscht
Ein feuchtes Weib hervor.

Sie sang zu ihm, sie sprach zu ihm:
»Was lockst du meine Brut
Mit Menschenwitz und Menschenlist
Hinauf in Todesglut?
Ach wüßtest du, wie's Fischlein ist
So wohlig auf dem Grund,
Du stiegst herunter, wie du bist,
Und würdest erst gesund.

Labt sich die liebe Sonne nicht,
Der Mond sich nicht im Meer?
Kehrt wellenatmend ihr Gesicht
Nicht doppelt schöner her?
Lockt dich der tiefe Himmel nicht,
Das feuchtverklärte Blau?
Lockt dich dein eigen Angesicht
Nicht her in ew'gen Tau?«

Das Wasser rauscht', das Wasser schwoll,
Netzt' ihm den nackten Fuß;
Sein Herz wuchs ihm so sehnsuchtsvoll
Wie bei der Liebsten Gruß.
Sie sprach zu ihm, sie sang zu ihm;
Da war's um ihn geschehn;
Halb zog sie ihn, halb sank er hin
Und ward nicht mehr gesehn.

Translation:

The waters purled, the waters swelled,—
A fisher sat near by,
And earnestly his line beheld
With tranquil heart and eye;
And while he sits and watches there,
He sees the waves divide,
And, lo! a maid, with glistening hair,
Springs from the troubled tide.

She sang to him, she spake to him,—
"Why lur'st thou from below,
In cruel mood, my tender brood,
To die in day’s fierce glow?
Ah! didst thou know how sweetly there
The little fishes dwell,
Thou wouldst come down their lot to share,
And be forever well.

"Bathes not the smiling sun at night—
The moon too—in the waves?
Comes he not forth more fresh and bright
From ocean's cooling caves?
Canst thou unmoved that deep world see,
That heaven of tranquil blue,
Where thine own face is beckoning thee
Down to the eternal dew?"

The waters purled, the waters swelled,
They kissed his naked feet;
His heart a nameless transport held,
As if his love did greet.
She spake to him, she sang to him;
Then all with him was o'er,—
Half drew she him, half sank he in,—
He sank to rise no more.

== Musical settings ==
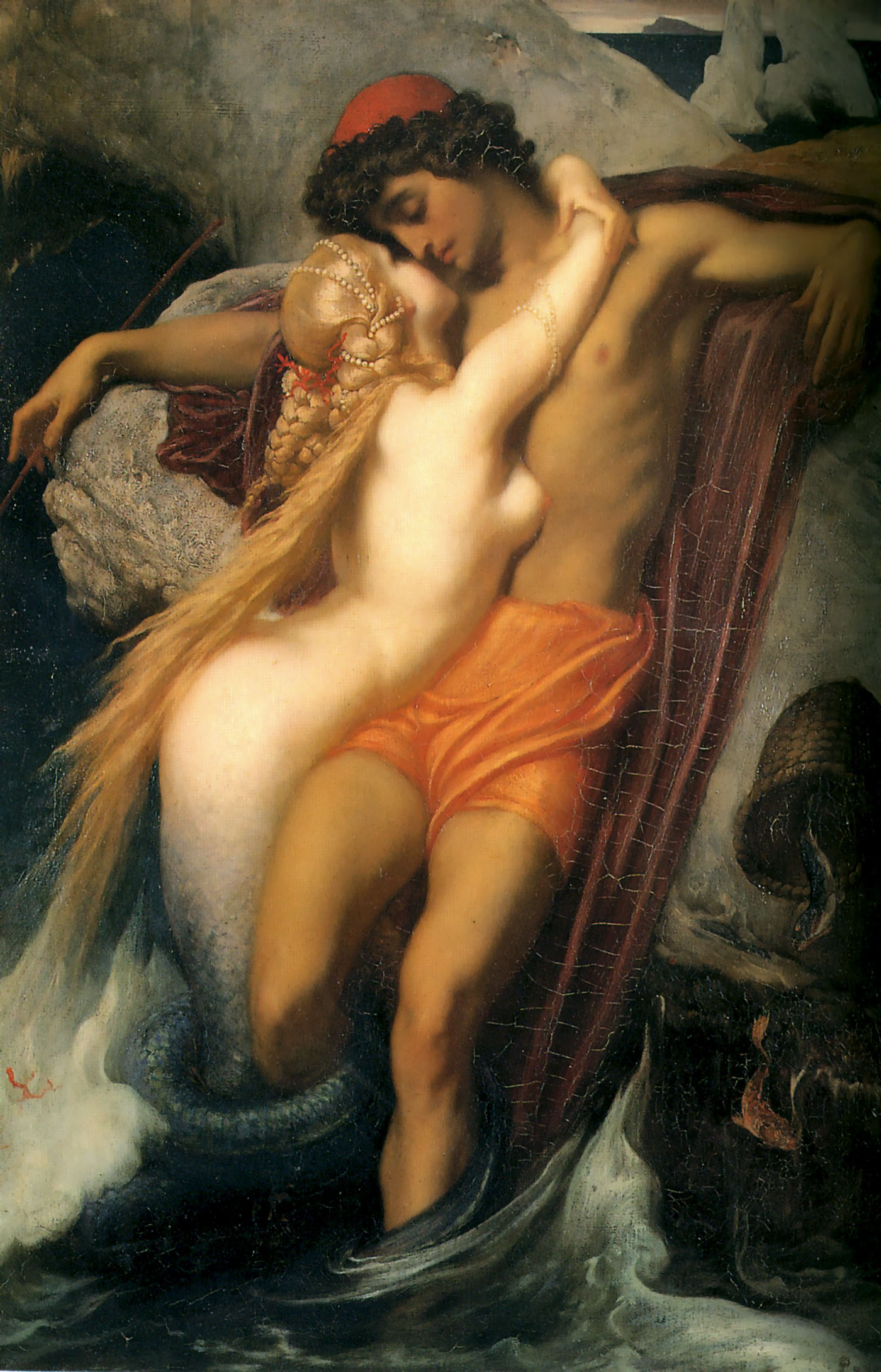
The Fisherman and the Syren, by Frederic Leighton (c. 1856–1858)

- Alphons Diepenbrock
- Anton Eberl
- Hans Sommer (1837–1922)
- Johann Vesque von Püttlingen (1803–1883)
- Anselm Hüttenbrenner (1794–1868)
- Fanny Mendelssohn
- Franz Schubert (1797–1828)
- Hector Berlioz (1803-1869)
- Claudio Santoro (1919-1989)

== Fine arts ==
Between 1856 and 1858, Frederic Leighton made the painting The Fisherman and the Syren, which is now on display in the Bristol City Museum and Art Gallery, with explicit reference to Goethe's poem:

Half drew she him,
Half sunk he in,
And never more was seen.

== Sources ==
- Brooks, Charles Timothy, trans. (1904). "The Fisher". In Carman, Bliss, et al. (eds.). The World’s Best Poetry. Vol. VI. Fancy. Philadelphia: John D. Morris & Co.
- Hyner, Bernadette H. & Stearns, Precious McKenzie (2009). Forces of Nature: Natural(-Izing) Gender and Gender(-Ing) Nature in the Discourses of Western Culture. Cambridge Scholars Publishing.
- Rhys, Ernest (1900). Frederic Lord Leighton: An Illustrated Record of his Life and Work. London: George Bell & Sons.
