= Fisher Island (disambiguation) =

Fisher Island is a census-designated place in Florida.

Fisher Island, or Fishers Island, may also refer to:

Antarctica

- Fisher Island (Antarctica)

Australia

- Fisher Island (Queensland)
- Fisher Island (Tasmania)
- Fisher Island Reef, Tasmania

Canada

- Qikiqtaryuaq (Bathurst Inlet), formerly Fishers Island, Nunavut

Germany

- Fischerinsel, a neighbourhood in Berlin

USA

- Fisher Island (Florida), an island in Miami-Dade County, Florida
- Fisher Island (Montana), an island in the Missouri River
- Fishers Island, New York

== See also ==
- Fisherman Island (disambiguation)
