= The Fishermen (Kirk novel) =

Danish collective novel by Hans Kirk

The Fishermen (Danish: Fiskerne) is a 1928 Danish novel by Hans Kirk, based on the true story of the conflict between the residents of the town of Gjøl and a group of fishermen who moved there from the North Sea coast.

The novel is based on a true story, and concerns the conflict between the newcomers, who observe a stricter form of Christian faith, and the existing residents. Kirk had a connection to the area through his father, and wrote the book while living at the old inn in the town, Gjøl Kro. It caused consternation in the town, but has sold more than 400,000 copies, more than any other books in Denmark except the Bible and the hymn book. It was Kirk's first novel, and in 1931 the Danish parliament awarded him an artist's stipend based on it.

The novel was adapted for radio in 1935, with Kirk as co-writer, and for television as a six-hour miniseries by DR in 1977 (rebroadcast in 1987).
