= Fisherman Island =

Fisherman Island or Fisherman's Island may refer to:

- Fisherman Island (Queensland), Australia
- Fisherman Island (New Zealand)
- Fisherman's Island, on Lake Pend Oreille, Idaho, United States
- Fisherman Island (Maine), United States
- Fisherman Island (Michigan), United States
- Fisherman's Island State Park, Michigan
- Fisherman Island (Virginia), United States
- Motungārara Island / Fishermans Island, New Zealand

== See also ==
- Fisher Island (disambiguation)
