= The Fishermen (sculpture) =

2018 sculpture by Jim and Christina Demetro

- Spanish: Los Pescadores
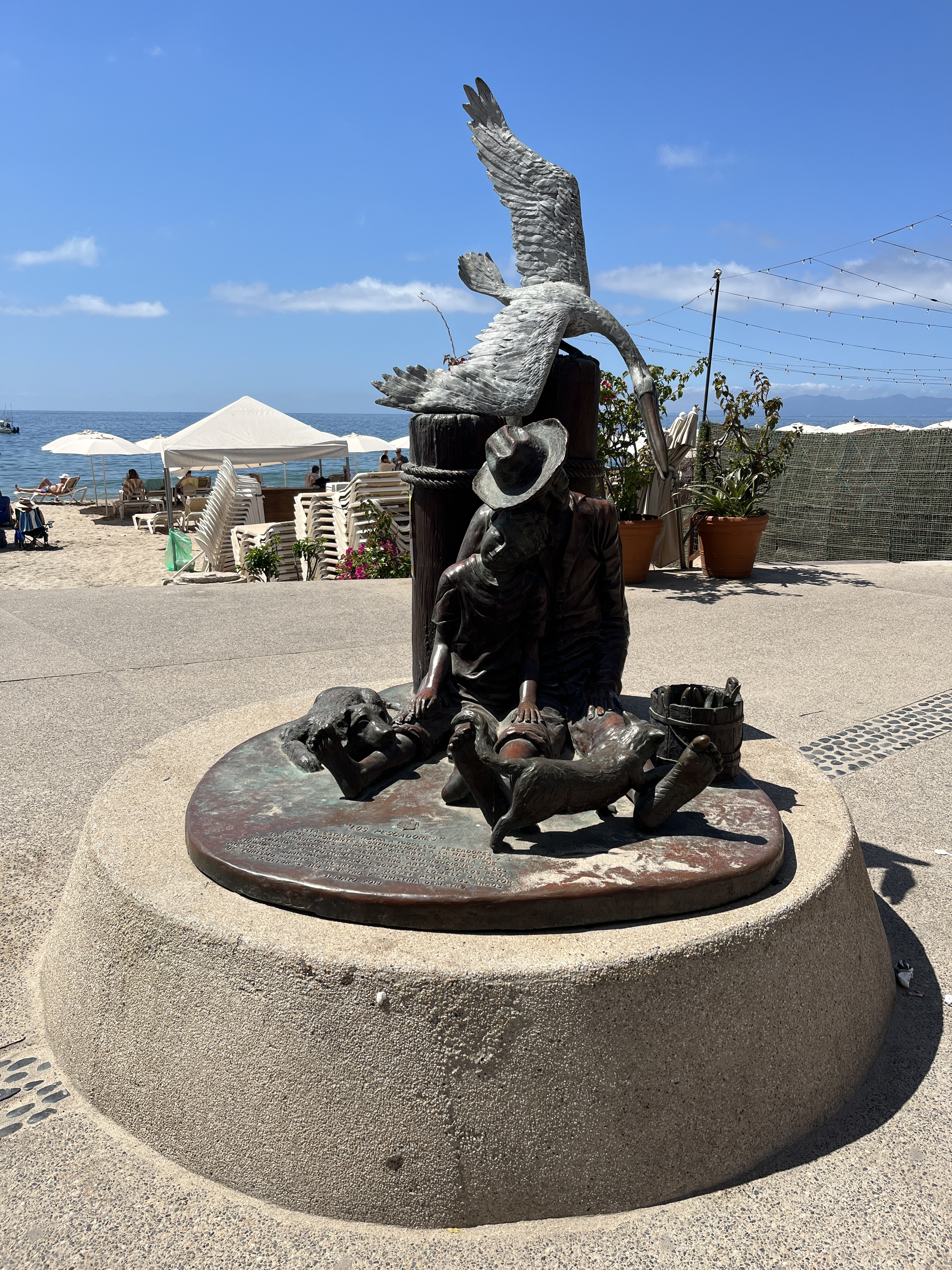
- The sculpture in 2023
- Artist: Jim Demetro; Christina Demetro
- Year: 2018
- Location: Puerto Vallarta, Jalisco, Mexico
- 20.6013°N 105.2386°W

The Fishermen (Spanish: "Los Pescadores") is a sculpture by Jim and Christina Demetro, installed in Puerto Vallarta.

== Description ==
The sculpture depicts a fisherman and his grandson napping, as well as a dog, a cat, a pelican, and a bucket of fish. Jim Demetro has said about the work's inspiration:

I was walking along the ocean and this fisherman caught a fish and he reeled it in and he took his fish off the hook and he put it in his bucket and this big pelican swooped down and grabbed the fish out of the bucket and jumped in the ocean with the fish and he tossed it up into the air to get in his beak, but it went in sideways like this, so he couldn't swallow it, so he tried and tried and tried and couldn't swallow it. So finally he came ashore and the fisherman grabbed him by the back of the neck and another one opened up his beak and took his fish out and put it back in the bucket and shooed the pelican off. That's a true story, I actually saw it happen.

An inscription reads, "This statue honors all fishermen and their important contributions to the history and traditions of Puerto Vallarta. This piece was supported by the generous contributions of citizens, the City Council, Mr. Arturo Dávalos Peña, Municipal President, Dr. Ramón González Lomelí, Director of Tourism Puerto Vallarta and Hotel Playa Los Arcos. Sculptors Jim Demetro and Christina Demetro. May 31, 2018".

== History ==
The sculpture was unveiled on June 1, 2018. Prior to the unveiling, the sculptors created a clay model and raised funds for the bronze by allowing people to "co-sculpt" the artwork for donations.
