= Mogens Klitgaard =

Danish author (1906–1945)

Mogens Klitgaard (23 August 1906 – 23 December 1945) was a Danish writer. He was born in Valby, Copenhagen. He published the novel Gud mildner Luften for de klippede Faar in 1938, about the superficiality of the bourgeoisie. He is most well-known, however, for his portrait of the man on the floor in Der sidder en Mand i en Sporvogn (1937) about a deroute during the economic crisis of the 1930s.

As a result of his activity in the Danish resistance movement, he fled to Sweden in 1943. He survived the war, but died soon after as a result of a recurrence of his childhood tuberculosis.
