= Nordic Bronze Age =

Archaeological period in Northern Europe

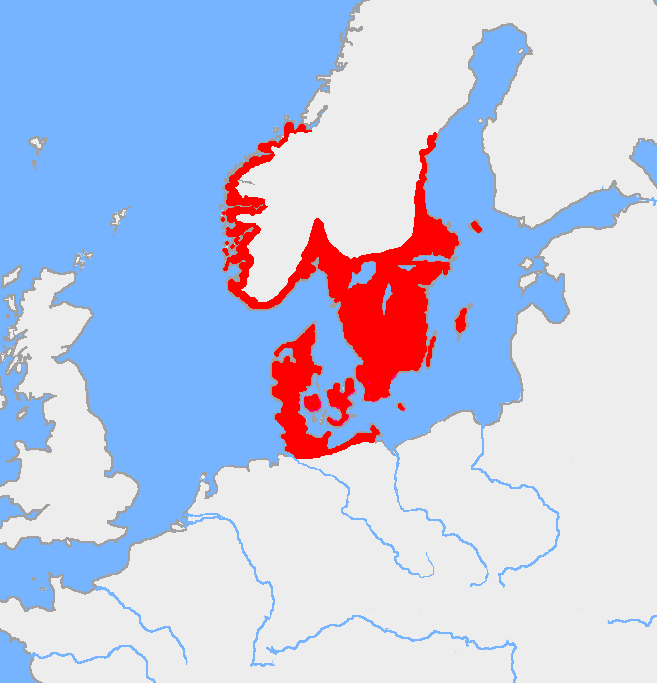
- Geographical range: Southern Scandinavia, northern Germany
- Period: Bronze Age
- Dates: c. 2000/1750–500 BC
- Preceded by: Battle Axe culture, Corded Ware culture, Bell Beaker culture, Nordic Stone Age
- Followed by: Jastorf culture, Pre-Roman Iron Age, Iron Age Scandinavia

The Nordic Bronze Age (also Northern Bronze Age, or Scandinavian Bronze Age) is a period of Scandinavian prehistory from c. 2000/1750–500 BC.

The Nordic Bronze Age culture emerged in the period 2000-1750 BC as a continuation of the Late Neolithic Dagger period, which is rooted in the Battle Axe culture (the Swedish-Norwegian Corded Ware variant), the Single Grave Culture (the north German and Danish Corded Ware variant) and Bell Beaker culture, as well as from influence that came from Central Europe. This influence most likely came from people similar to those of the Únětice culture, since they brought customs that were derived from Únětice or from local interpretations of the Únětice culture located in North Western Germany. The metallurgical influences from Central Europe are especially noticeable. The Bronze Age in Scandinavia can be said to begin shortly after 2000 BC with the introduction and use of bronze tools, followed by a more systematic adoption of bronze metalworking technology from 1750 BC.

The Nordic Bronze Age maintained close trade links with Mycenaean Greece, with whom it shares several striking similarities. Some cultural similarities between the Nordic Bronze Age, the Sintashta/Andronovo culture and peoples of the Rigveda have also been detected. (Note: "European Late Neolithic and Bronze Age cultures such as Corded Ware, Bell Beakers, Unetice, and the Scandinavian cultures are genetically very similar to each other... The close affinity we observe between peoples of Corded Ware and Sintashta cultures suggests similar genetic sources of the two... Among Bronze Age Europeans, the highest tolerance frequency was found in Corded Ware and the closely-related Scandinavian Bronze Age cultures... The Andronovo culture, which arose in Central Asia during the later Bronze Age, is genetically closely related to the Sintashta peoples, and clearly distinct from both Yamnaya and Afanasievo. Therefore, Andronovo represents a temporal and geographical extension of the Sintashta gene pool... There are many similarities between Sintasthta/Androvono rituals and those described in the Rig Veda and such similarities even extend as far as to the Nordic Bronze Age.") The Nordic Bronze Age region included part of northern Germany, and some scholars also include sites in what is now Estonia, Finland and Pomerania as part of its cultural sphere.

The people of the Nordic Bronze Age were actively engaged in the export of amber, and imported metals in return, becoming expert metalworkers. With respect to the number and density of metal deposits, the Nordic Bronze Age became the richest culture in Europe during its existence.

Iron metallurgy began to be practised in Scandinavia during the later Bronze Age, from at least the 9th century BC. Around the 5th century BC, the Nordic Bronze Age was succeeded by the Pre-Roman Iron Age and the Jastorf culture. The Nordic Bronze Age is ancestral to the Germanic peoples.

== History ==
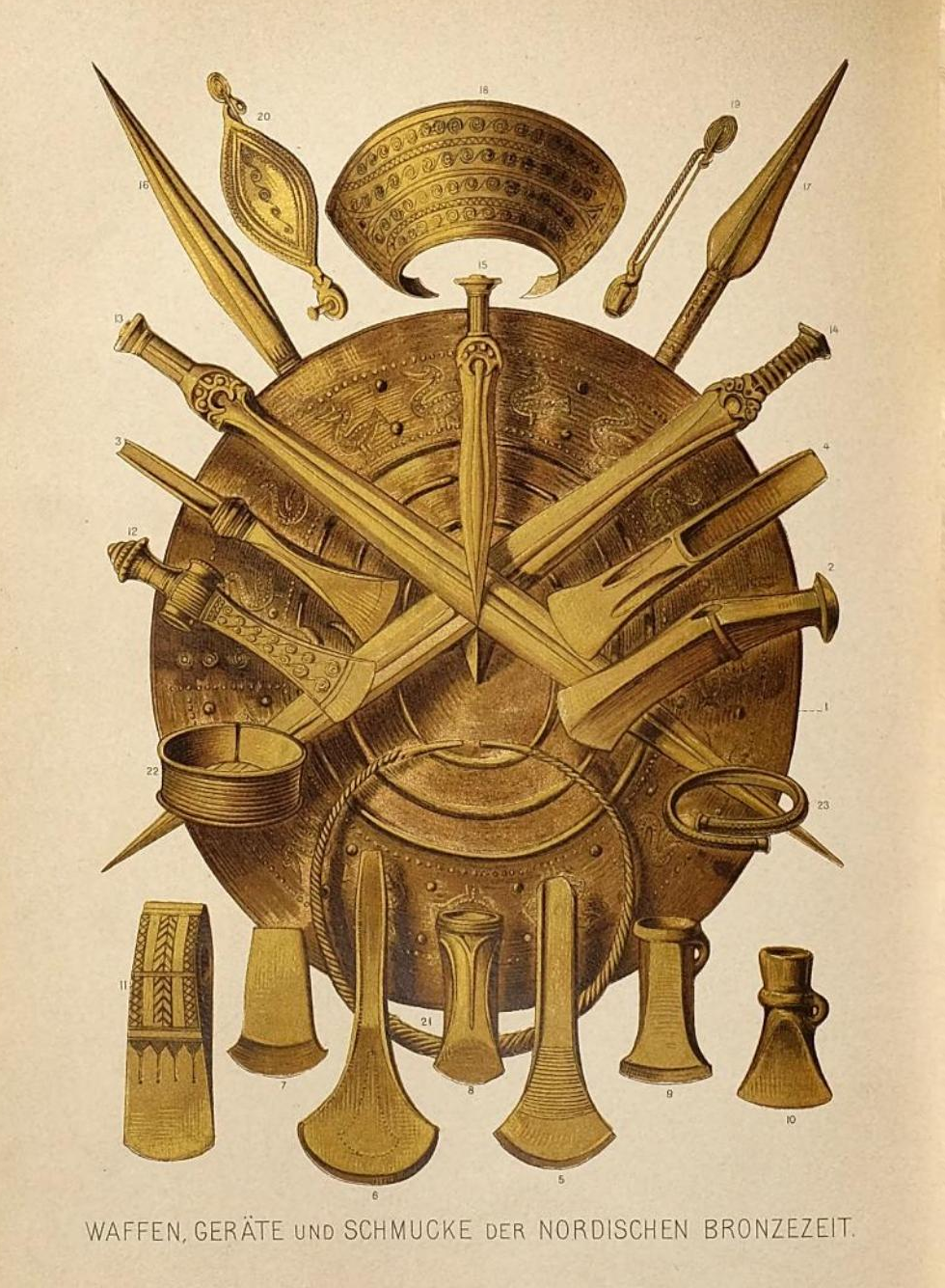
1887 illustration of Nordic Bronze Age artefacts

=== Origins ===
The Nordic Bronze Age is a successor of the Corded Ware culture in southern Scandinavia and Northern Germany. It appears to represent a fusion of elements from the Corded Ware culture and the preceding Pitted Ware culture. The decisive factor that triggered the change from the Chalcolithic Battle Axe culture into the Nordic Bronze Age is often believed to have been metallurgical influence as well as general cultural influence from Central Europe, similar in custom to those of the Únětice culture.

=== Chronology ===
Oscar Montelius, who coined the term used for the period, divided it into six distinct sub-periods in his piece Om tidsbestämning inom bronsåldern med särskilt avseende på Skandinavien ("On Bronze Age dating with particular focus on Scandinavia") published in 1885, which is still in wide use. His relative chronology has held up well against radiocarbon dating, with the exception that the period's start is closer to 1700 BC than 1800 BC, as Montelius suggested. For Central Europe a different system developed by Paul Reinecke is commonly used, as each area has its own artifact types and archaeological periods.

A broader subdivision is the Early Bronze Age, between 1700 BC and 1100 BC, and the Late Bronze Age, 1100 BC to 550 BC. These divisions and periods are followed by the Pre-Roman Iron Age.

== Culture ==
=== Settlements ===
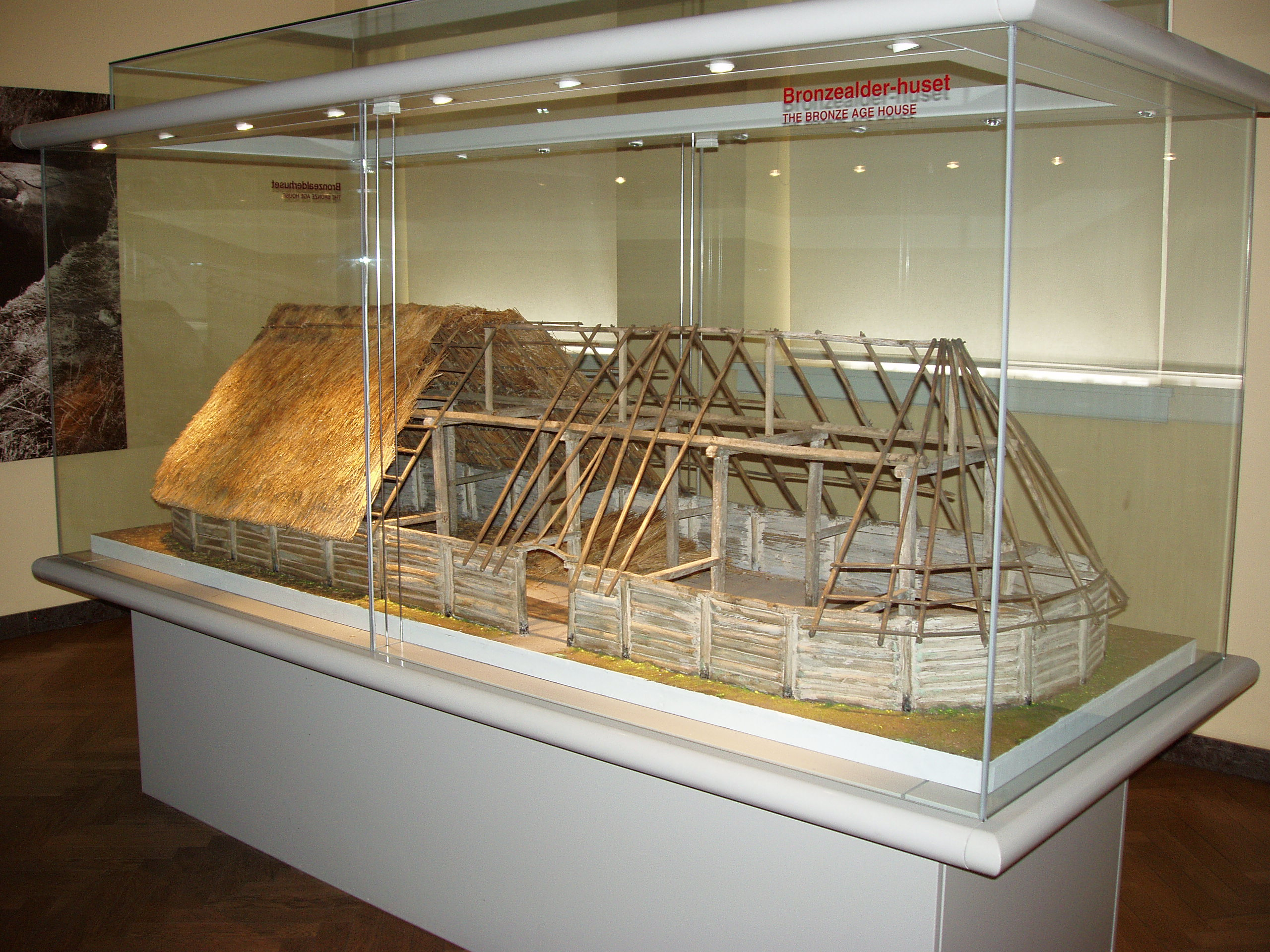
Model of a Bronze Age house, National Museum of Denmark

Settlement in the Nordic Bronze Age period consisted mainly of single farmsteads, which usually consisted of a longhouse plus additional four-post built structures (helms). Longhouses were initially two aisled, and after c. 1300 BC three aisled structure became normal. Some longhouses were exceptionally large (up to 10m wide by 50m in length, or 500 m^{2} in area) and have been described as "chiefly halls", with sitting areas "the size of a megaron in contemporary Mycenean palaces". Larger settlements are also known from the later Bronze Age (such as Hallunda and Apalle in Sweden, and Voldtofte in Denmark), as well as fortified sites, specialist workshops for metalwork and ceramic production, and dedicated cult houses.

Settlements were geographically located on higher ground, and tended to be concentrated near the sea. Certain settlements functioned as regional centres of power, trade, craft production, and ritual activity. The Bronze Age fortified town of Hünenburg bei Watenstedt in northern Germany (12th c. BC) served as a trading post for people from Scandinavia and the Baltic Sea region, as well as a cult centre and the seat of a ruling elite. The settlement was surrounded by a large stone-faced wall in the Late Bronze Age. Another Late Bronze Age settlement at Vistad in Östergötland, Sweden, was surrounded by a substantial wooden fortification pallisade.

The total population in Scandinavia during the Nordic Bronze Age is estimated to have been c. 300,000-500,000 people, with a relatively low population density of c. 12–15 people per km^{2} in the most densely populated micro-regions and four to six people in less dense areas.

=== Burials ===
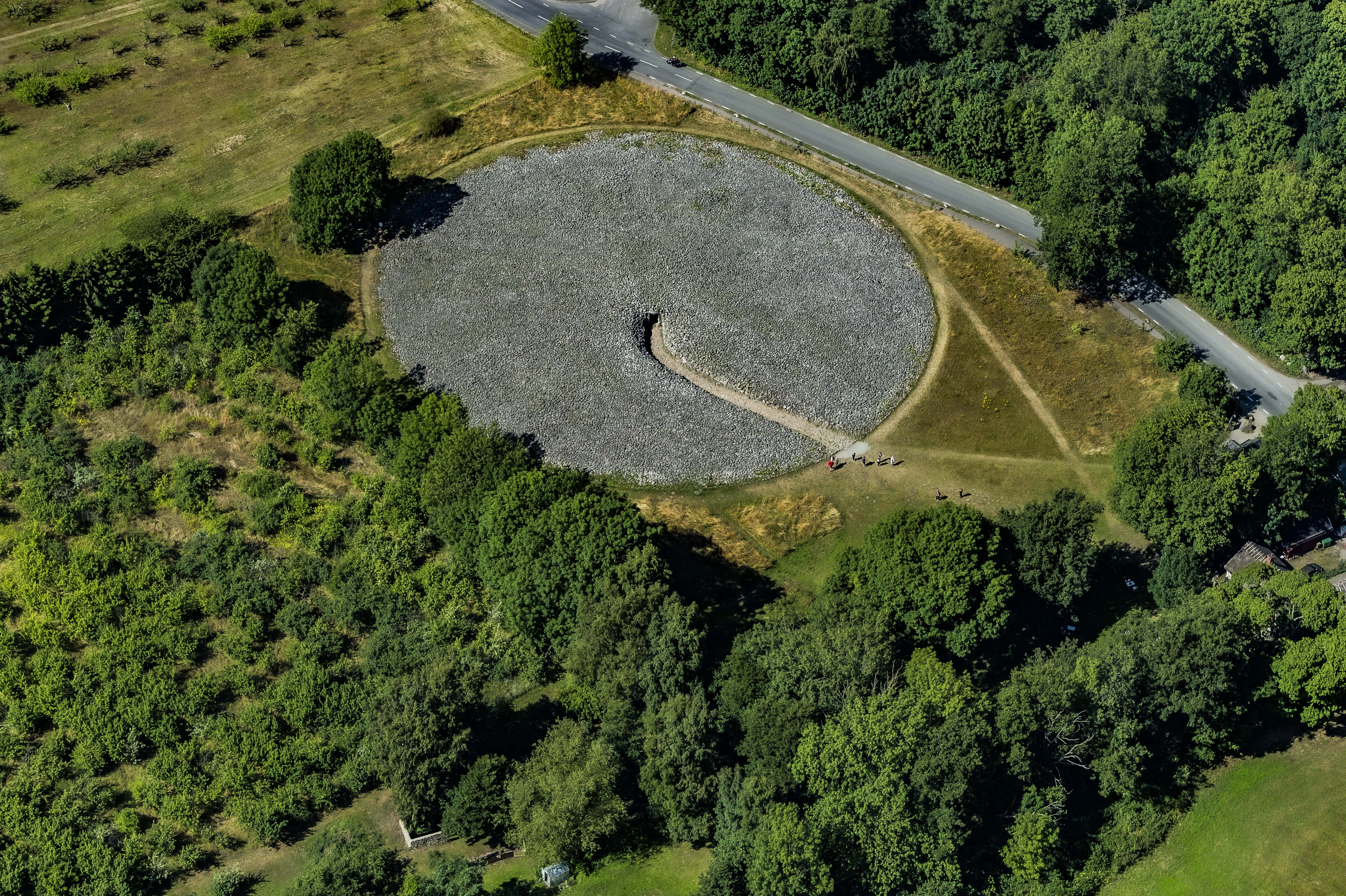
Kivik 'King's Grave', Sweden, c. 1400 BC

Associated with Nordic Bronze Age settlements are burial cairns, mounds and cemeteries, with interments including oak coffins and urn burials; other settlement associations include rock carvings, or bronze hoards in wetland sites. Some burial mounds are especially large and, with respect to the amount of gold and bronze in them, extraordinarily rich for this time period. Examples of prominent burial mounds include the Håga mound, Kivik King's Grave and Sagaholm in Sweden, and the Lusehøj, Buskehøj and Skelhøj in Denmark. A minimum of 50,000 burial mounds were constructed between 1500 and 1150 BC in Denmark alone.

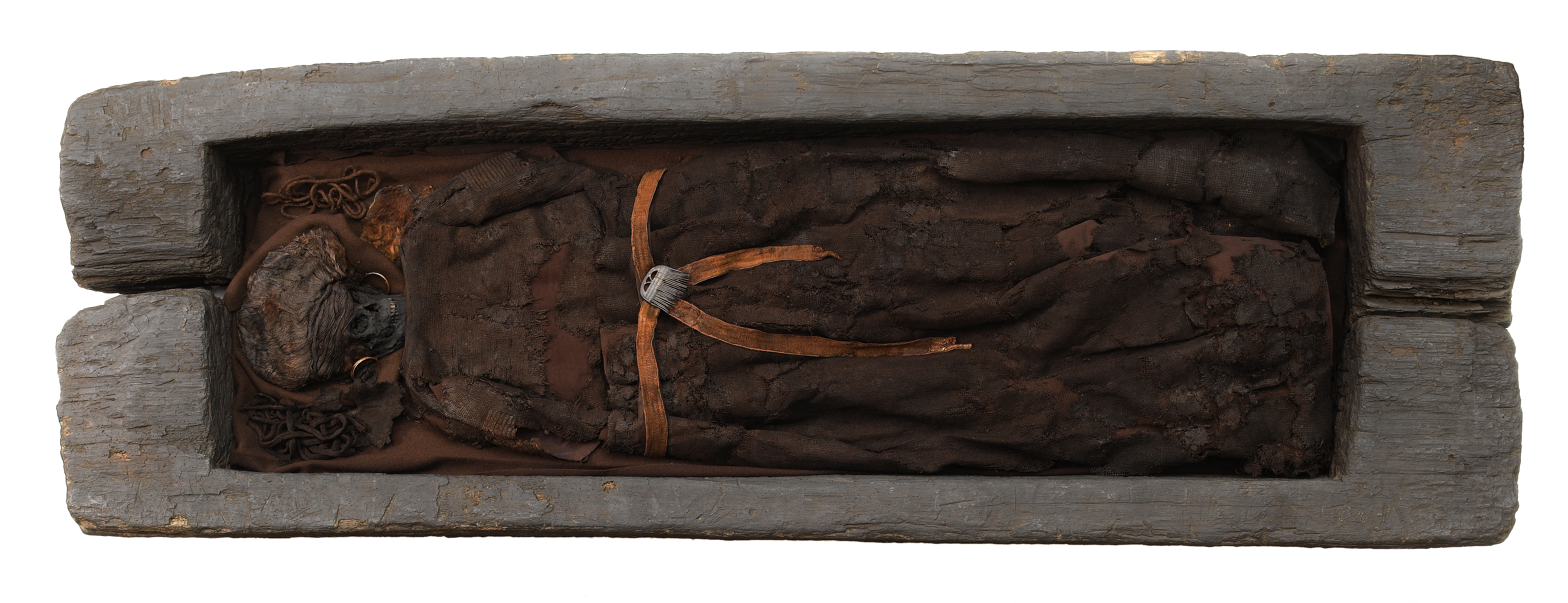
Skrydstrup Woman, partly mummified body and preserved textiles in an oak coffin, Denmark, c. 1300 BC

Oak coffin burials dating from the 14th–13th centuries BC contained well-preserved and partly-mummified bodies, along with their clothing and burial goods. Notable examples include the Egtved Girl, Skrydstrup Woman, and burials from Borum Eshøj and Trindhoj in Denmark. Bodies were intentionally mummified by watering the burial mounds to create a bog-like, oxygen-free environment within the graves, resulting in the preservation of soft tissue and hair.

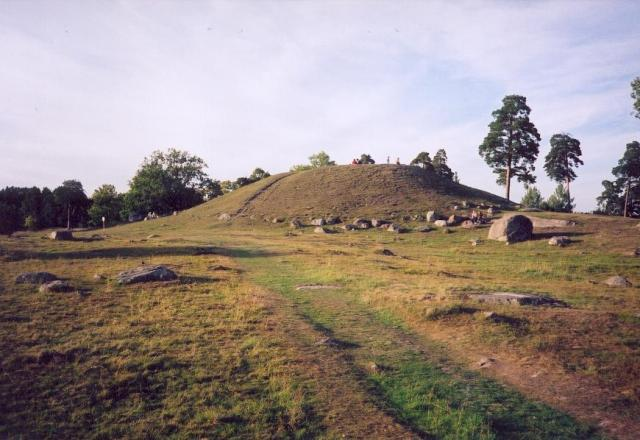
Håga burial mound, Sweden, c. 1000 BC

A fundamental change in burial customs took place at the turn from the Older to the Younger Bronze Age. After a long period of inhumation burials, people gradually switched to cremation burials. During Period III of the Early Bronze Age (1300-1100 BCE), cremated remains were still buried in the old tradition in elongated pits or tree/oak coffins. With the beginning of the Later Bronze Age (Period IV, 1100-900 BCE), urn burials became established, although for a long time they were still placed in and around barrows. It was not until the seventh century that the first urn fields were created. Researchers used to think that urnfields appeared at the beginning of the Iron Age, around 530 BCE, but new findings from a group of researchers at the Collaborative Research Centre 1266 at Kiel University show that this happened a century earlier than previously thought.

The Late Bronze Age King's Grave of Seddin in northern Germany (9th century BC) has been described as a "Homeric burial" due to its close similarity to contemporary elite burials in Greece and Italy. A large 'king's hall' and an associated settlement were located near to the Seddin grave.

=== Agriculture ===
In the Nordic Bronze Age, both agriculture (including cultivation of wheat, millet, and barley) and animal husbandry (keeping of domesticated animals such as cattle, sheep and pigs) were practiced. Fishing and hunting were also sources of food, which included shellfish, deer, elk, and other wild animals. There is evidence that oxen were used as draught animals; domesticated dogs were common, but horses were rarer and probably status symbols.

=== Metalwork ===
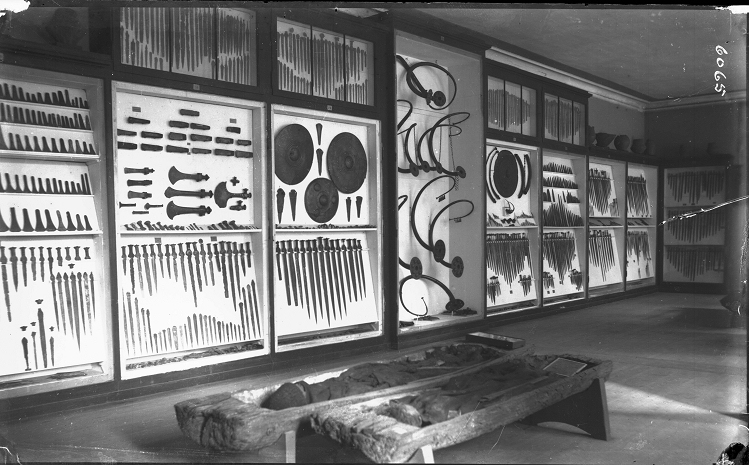
National Museum display, Denmark (photo from 1880)

Scandinavian Bronze Age sites present a rich and well-preserved legacy of bronze and gold objects. These valuable metals were all imported, primarily from Central Europe, but they were usually crafted locally and the craftsmanship and metallurgy of the Nordic Bronze Age was of a high standard. The lost-wax casting method was used to produce artefacts such as the Trundholm Sun Chariot and the Langstrup belt plate.

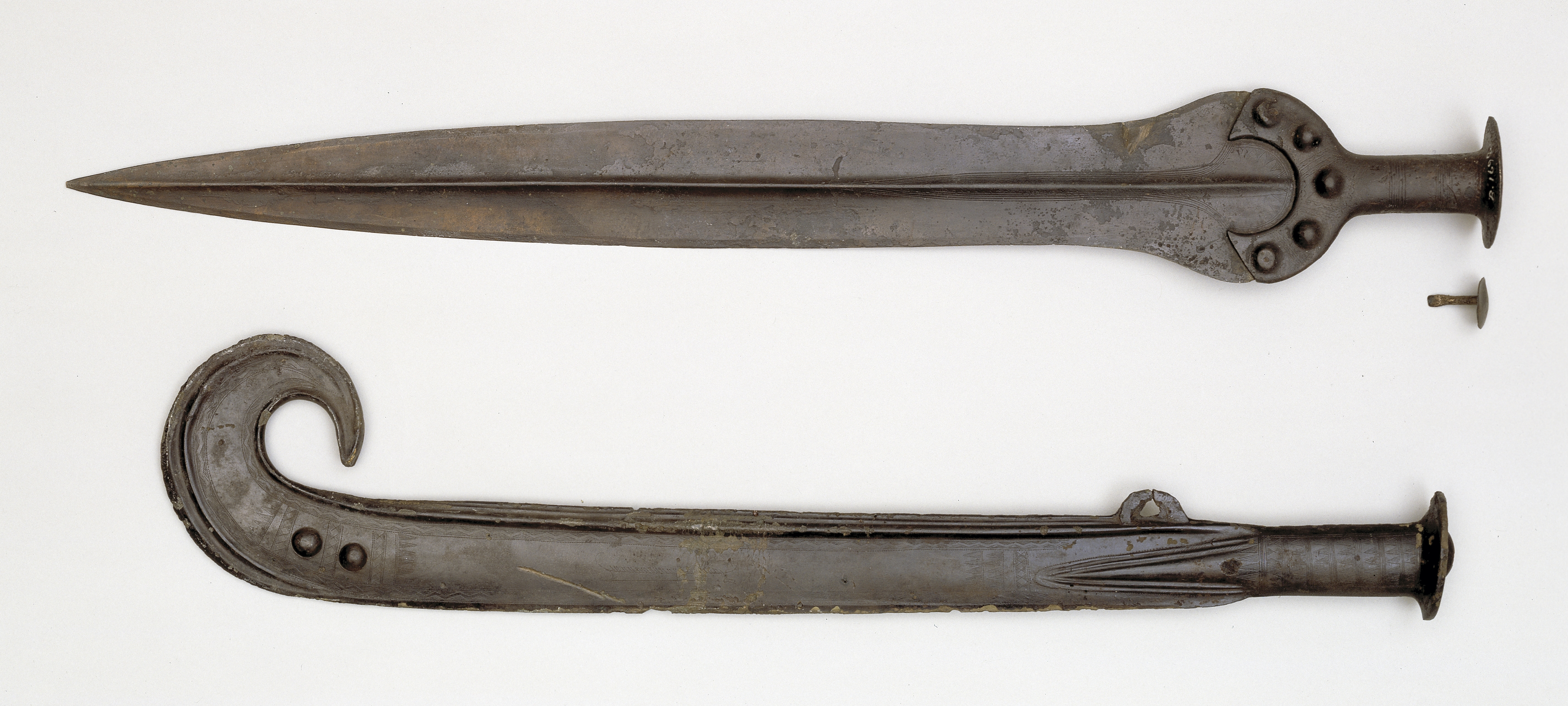
Bronze swords. Rørby, Denmark, 1700-1500 BC

Early examples of bronze artefacts include hoards from Pile in Sweden and Skeldal in Denmark, dating from c. 2000-1700 BC. Copper metallurgy had previously been practised by the Bell Beaker culture in Jutland (Denmark) since c. 2400 BC, including the production of axes and ornaments. During the 15th and 14th centuries BC, southern Scandinavia produced and deposited more elaborate bronzes in graves and hoards than any other region of Europe. With regards to the number and density of metal deposits, the Nordic Bronze Age became the richest culture in Europe. More Bronze Age swords have been found in Denmark than anywhere else in Europe, and uniform crucibles found at metal workshop sites indicate the mass production of certain metal artefacts. According to Kristiansen and Larsson, "Qualitatively the artistic and technical expressions [of the Nordic Bronze Age] are above anything in Europe except Minoan/Mycenaean culture; quantitatively there is no region in Europe with such an accumulation of high-quality weapons and ornaments during the period 1500–1000 BC, and that includes the Minoan/Mycenaean culture."

The archaeological legacy of the Nordic Bronze Age also encompasses locally crafted wool and wooden objects.

=== Rock carvings ===
The west coast of Sweden, namely Bohuslän, has the largest concentration of Bronze Age rock carvings in Scandinavia; and Scandinavia has the largest number of Bronze Age rock carvings in Europe. The west coast of Sweden is home to around 1,500 recorded rock engraving sites, with more being discovered every year. When the rock carvings were made, the area was the coastline; but it is now 25 meters above sea level. The engravings in the region depict everyday life, weapons, human figures, fishing nets, ships, chariots, plows, the sun, deer, bulls, horses, and birds. By far, the most dominant theme is human figures and ships, especially ships — 10,000 of which have recorded. The typical ship depicts a crew of six to thirteen. Rock carvings in the late Bronze Age, and even the early Iron Age, often depict conflict, power, and mobility. Important sites of Bronze Age rock art include Tanum in Sweden and Madsebakke in Denmark.

=== Warrior ethos ===
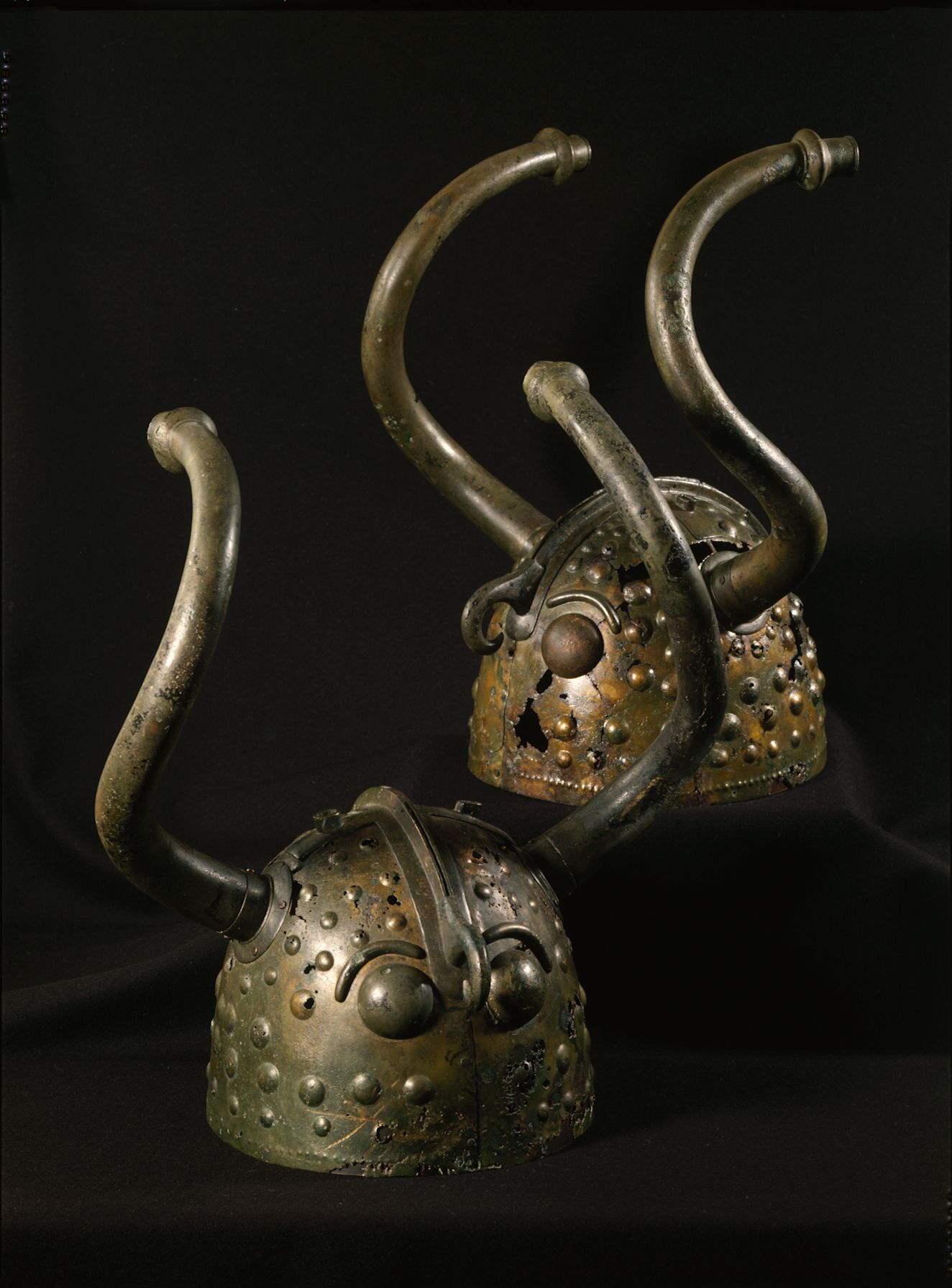
Veksø helmets, Denmark, c. 1200-1000 BC

The culture of the Nordic Bronze Age was that of a warrior culture, with a strong emphasis on weapons and status. Helle Vandkilde of Aarhus University, in her publications from 1995, describes most men of the period as having followed a warrior ethos. More than 70% of burials dating to the Nordic Bronze Age contain metal objects of various kinds, the most common objects being swords and daggers. It is noted that the people of the Nordic Bronze Age also placed great importance on helmets of intricate design, which they put much effort into making. However, not all of the weapons and armour of the Nordic Bronze Age were used for warfare. Some of them are believed to have been ceremonial, especially the helmets.

Despite the importance of weapons in their society, archaeological discoveries suggest that intrasocietal violence was not particularly common in the Nordic Bronze Age, especially not when compared to contemporary European Bronze Age cultures. The people of the Nordic Bronze Age seem to instead have been directing their military efforts outwards, likely against people of neighbouring cultures, and are believed to have participated in battles along the Amber Road and other trade routes that were important for the continuous prosperity of their society.

Many of the stone carvings from the Nordic Bronze Age depict boats in great numbers as well as groups of armed men manning the boats. Finds such as the Hjortspring boat, among others, give further credence to the theory that Bronze Age people in Scandinavia relied heavily on naval dominance of the waters surrounding their region in order to secure trade and safety.

==== Tollense valley battle ====
Ancient DNA and archaeological evidence show that people from the Nordic Bronze Age sphere were involved in the battle at the Tollense valley battlefield in northern Germany (13th century BC), as well as people from cultures in southern Central Europe. The Tollense battlefield is "the largest excavated and archaeologically verifiable battle site of this age in the world". The battle coincided with the beginning of the Late Bronze Age collapse in the Mediterranean region, including the collapse of the Mycenaean civilization in Greece, the Hittite civiilization in Anatolia, and the invasion of the Sea Peoples in Egypt. Not long after the Tollense battle, heavily fortified settlements began to be built in northern Europe. According to Helle Vandkilde, the Tollense battle marks beginning of a period of radical social change and "increased warfare everywhere."

=== International contacts and trade ===
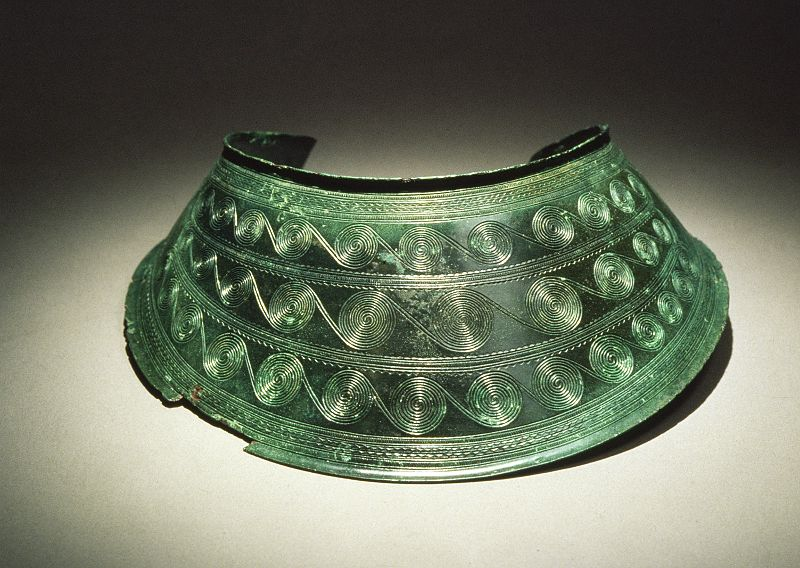
Bronze collar with spiral design from Loshult, Sweden, 1500-1300 BC

Increased metal production and exchange appears at around 2100 BCE, when copper was imported from Slovakia via central Germany, and tin from the British Isles. The triangular network is relevant for a few centuries during the Late Neolithic (2250-1700 BCE) and the beginning of the Early Bronze Age (1700-1600 BCE). This triangular network is slightly older, as shown by the distribution of straight-walled cups in Denmark and central Germany/Bohemia, and Scandinavian flint axes found on the British Isles. Copper was also imported from Britain in the Early Bronze Age in exchange for amber.

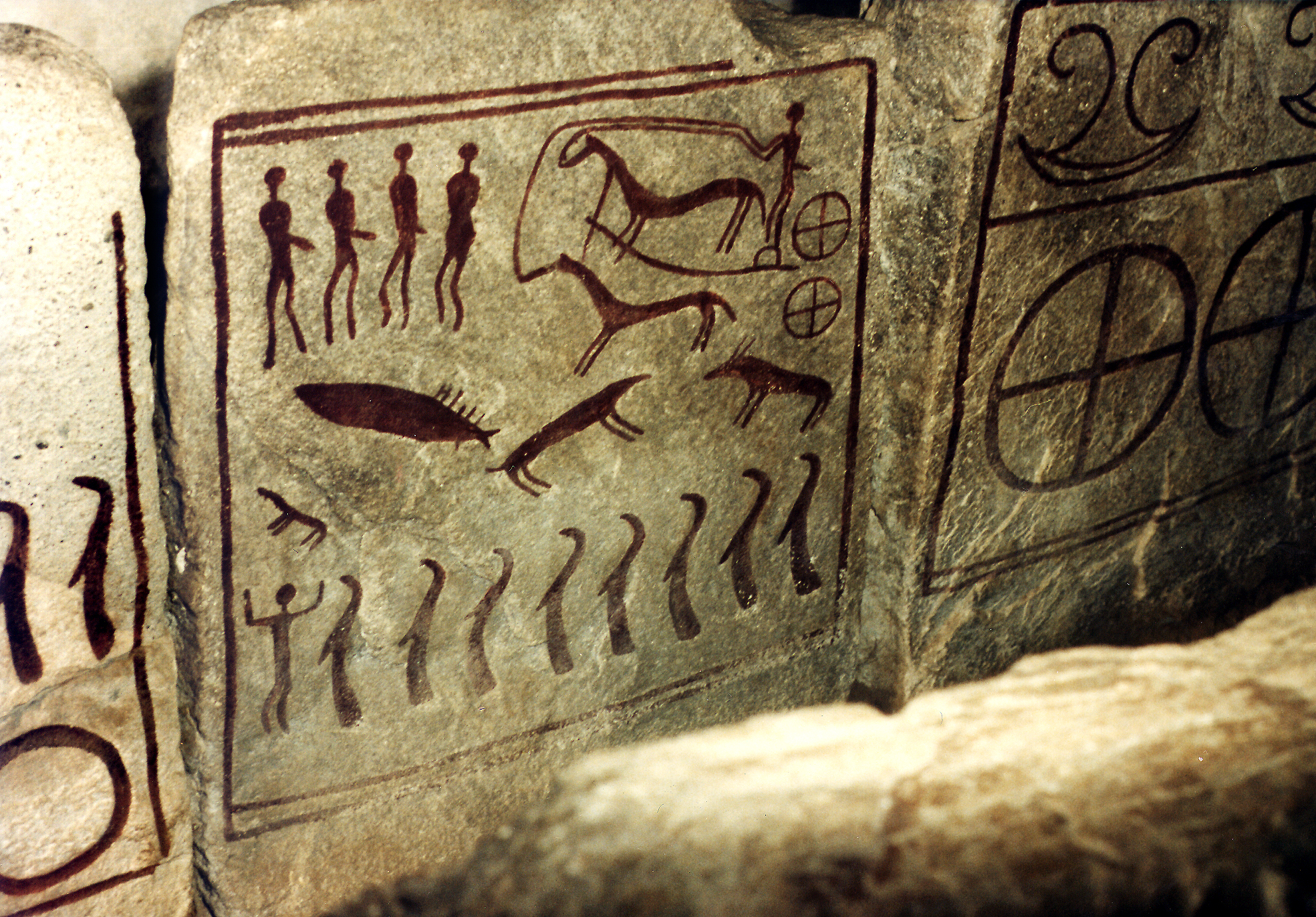
Chariot petroglyph, Kivik grave, Sweden, 16th-15th century BC

The Nordic Bronze Age maintained intimate trade links with the Tumulus culture and Mycenaean Greece. The Nordic Bronze Age exported amber through the Amber Road, and imported metals in return. During the time of the Nordic Bronze Age, metals, such as copper, tin and gold, were imported into Scandinavia on a massive scale. Copper was imported from Sardinia, Iberia and Cyprus. The trade network was briefly disrupted during the Late Bronze Age collapse in the 12th century BC.

Evidence for horse-drawn chariots appears in Scandinavia c. 1700 BC, around the same time or earlier than it appears in Greece. In both cases the chariots appear to have come from the region of the Carpathian Basin or the western steppe. Cheek-pieces and whip handles in Denmark dating from this time feature curvilinear 'wave-band' designs that are also found on contemporary artefacts from the Carpathian Basin and Greece, including in the elite shaft graves at Mycenae. These designs subsequently appear on Nordic Bronze Age metalwork, including on the gold disc of the Trundholm Sun Chariot. Engraved depictions of chariots appear in Scandinavian rock art from c. 1700 BC onwards, as they do on engraved stone stelae from Mycenae. The introduction of the chariot in Scandinavia coincided with the introduction of socketed spearheads, whose ultimate origin Vandkilde (2014) ascribes to the Seima-Turbino culture. Cheek-pieces and belt hooks adorned with horse heads are suggested to have originated from the Carpathian Basin, making their way into Scandinavia.

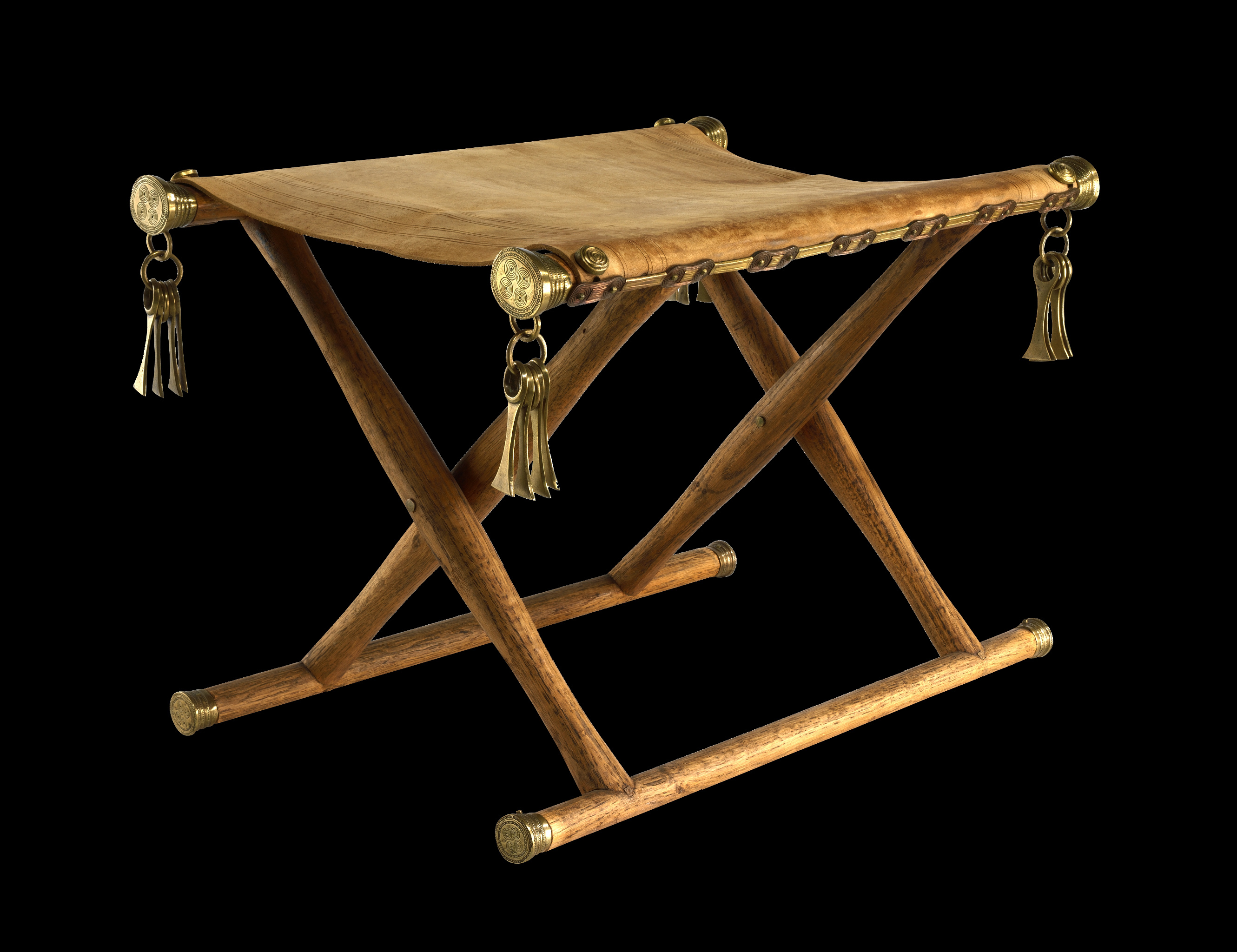
Daensen folding chair (reconstruction), Germany, c. 1400 BC

Chariot wheels in Scandinavia are depicted with four spokes, as in Mycenaean Greece and the Carpathian Basin. A depiction of a two-wheeled vehicle with four-spoked wheels is also known from Kültepe in Central Anatolia, dating from c. 1900 BC, concurrent with the appearance of steppe horses in this region. In contrast, chariot wheels from the Sintashta culture and Andronovo cultures near the Urals had more than four spokes. Miniature spoked-wheel models have been found in the Carpathian Basin dating to the 20th–19th centuries BC, and cheek-pieces are known there from c. 2000 BC. According to Maran (2020, 2014) chariots probably originated "in the entire zone between the Carpathian Basin and the Southern Ural", rather than just in the Ural region, and spread southwards from there to Greece and the Near East. In the case of Greece this is given some support by analyses of skeletal material from the shaft graves at Mycenae, which also indicate connections to the north. Chechushkov & Epimakhov (2018) suggest that chariot technology developed before 2000 BC in the Don-Volga interfluve, in the context of pre-Sintashta cultures (such as the Abashevo culture).

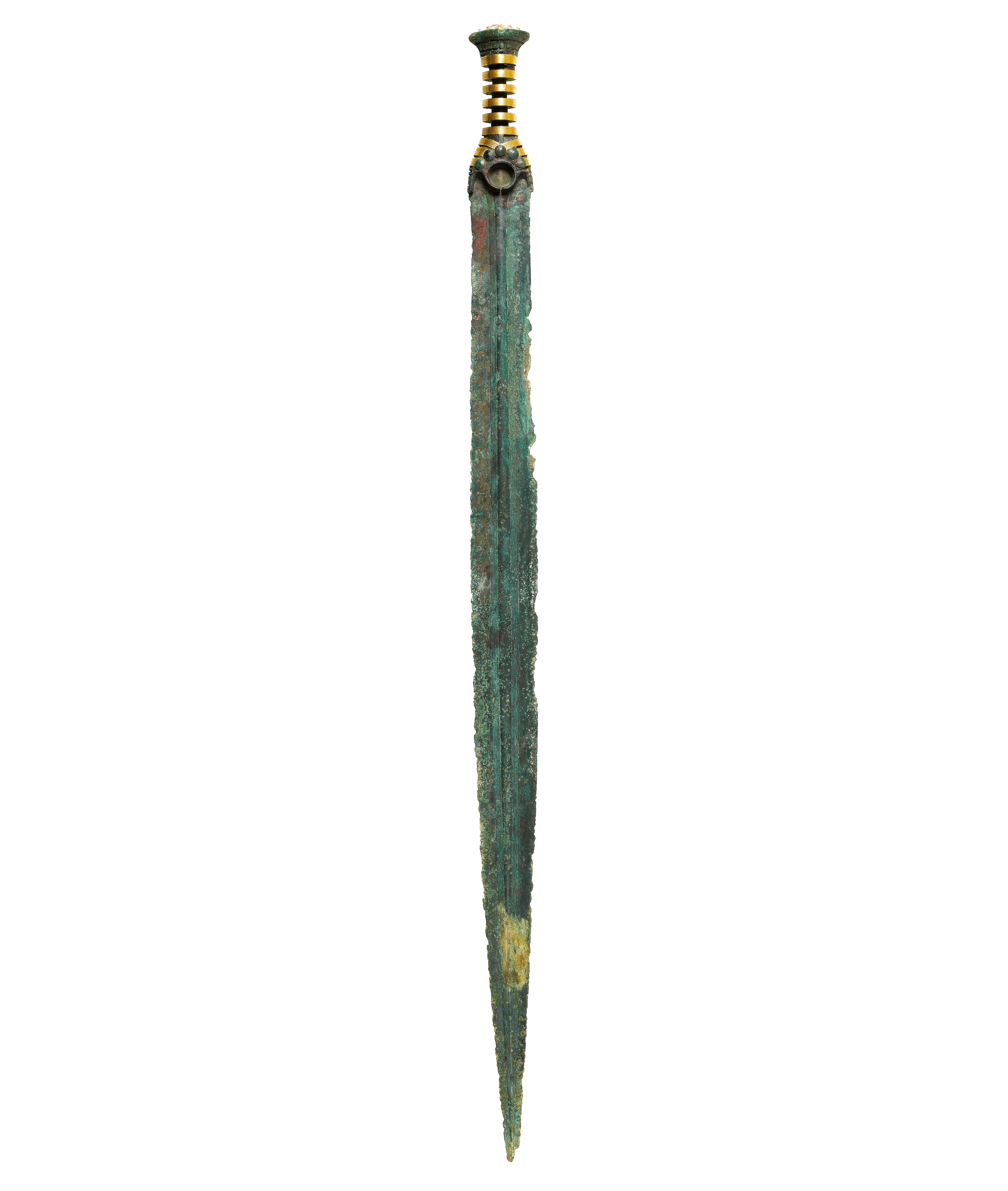
Bronze sword with gold hilt, Denmark, 1300-1100 BC

Baltic amber has been found in the elite shaft graves of Mycenae, dating from the 17th-16th centuries BC, as well as in other sites of Bronze Age Greece. The amber from early Mycenaean burials is in the form of necklaces which were made in Britain. Amber may have also been imported via the Únětice culture in central Europe.

According to Kristiansen and Larsson (2005), "foreign origins were most consciously demonstrated in the formation of the Nordic Bronze Age Culture from 1500 BC onwards, basing itself on a Minoan/Mycenaean template." During the 15th–14th centuries BC the Nordic Bronze Age and Mycenaean Greece shared the use of similar flange-hilted swords, as well as select elements of shared lifestyle, such as campstools, drinking vessels decorated with solar symbols, and tools for body care including razors and tweezers. This "Mycenaean package", including spiral decoration, was directly adopted in southern Scandinavia after 1500 BC, creating "a specific and selective Nordic variety of Mycenaean high culture" that was not adopted in the intermediate region of Central Europe. These similarities can not have come about without intimate contacts, probably through the travels of warriors and mercenaries. Archaeological evidence further indicates the existence in both regions of shared institutions linked to warriors. Specifically, the dual organisation of leadership between a Wanax (ritual chief) and a Lawagetas (warrior chief) in Mycenaean Greece was apparently replicated in the Nordic Bronze Age. However this dual organization may have also been part of a shared Indo-European tradition. Other similarities have been noted in artistic iconography from both regions and its associated cosmology. Some of the contacts between Scandinavia and Greece were probably conveyed through Central Europe.

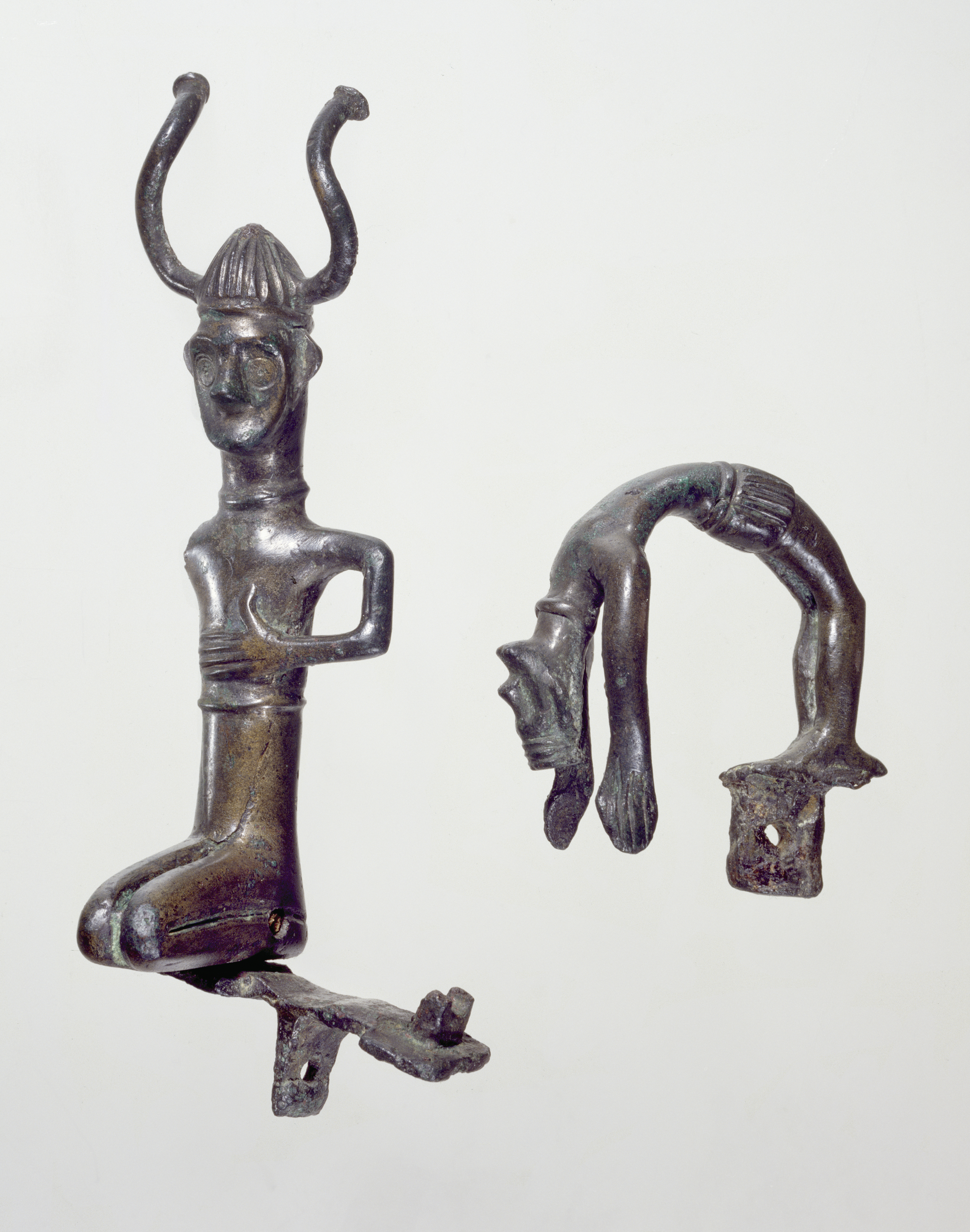
Bronze figurines from Grevensvænge, Denmark

Cultural connections with the Hittites have also been suggested. These include a sign or symbol akin to the Hittite hieroglyph meaning 'divine' found among the rock carvings at Fossum in Sweden, associated with possible images of divinities. According to Kristiansen & Larsson (2005), "From the eighteenth century BC until the beginning of the fifteenth century BC networks were operating between the Hittites, the steppe and the Carpathians, with direct link to northern Europe. During this period basic institutions were transmitted north in exchange for amber and horses, while at the same time the institution of chariotry was transmitted south from the steppe".

Kristiansen has a suggested a connection between a unique panel of petroglyphs at Oppeby in Sweden (dated to the 18th century BC) and signs of the 'Lipari script' attested on pottery from the island of Lipari (Italy) in the Tyrrhenian Sea, dating from c. 1500 BC, some of which show a close similarity to Linear A symbols, as well as to some Hittite symbols.

Trade and cultural contacts have also been noted between the Nordic Bronze Age and New Kingdom Egypt. The Nordic Bronze Age practice of log coffin burial and mummification may have been stimulated by Egyptian cultural influence, as it coincided with the appearance of Egyptian artefacts in Scandinavia and Baltic amber in Egypt (e.g. in the tomb of Tutankhamun). Intentional mummification within oak coffin burials is also attested in Britain at an earlier date however (c. 2300 BC), suggesting another possible origin for the practice.

Close similarities have been noted between Nordic Bronze Age figurines, horned helmets and rock art and similar artefacts and imagery from Late Bronze Age Sardinia and Iberia. Vandkilde links these to the Sea Peoples who attacked Egypt in 1178 BC, who "may even have included maritime warriors from the Atlantic zone and northern Europe." Similarities have also been noted between depictions of ships in Scandinavia and Northwest Iberia, supporting the existence of long-distance connections and maritime trade networks across Atlantic Europe.

Contacts during the Late Bronze Age (period IV–VI) were more intensive with Central Europe and Italy. A lot of similarities are seen in art and iconography between different continental Urnfield cultures and the Hallstatt culture. Copper was imported from Central Europe and Italy.

An ancient DNA study by Yediay et al. (2024, Preprint) identified two individuals buried in Cyprus dating from c. 1700 BCE who clustered with Nordic Bronze Age individuals. One of these individuals carried the male haplogroup I1 and displayed a non-local strontium isotope signature compatible with an origin in Scandinavia (particularly Sweden), revealing "an extraordinary journey from Scandinavia to Cyprus". The authors suggest that this may be related to the presence of ring ingots and dress pins from the Central European Únětice culture in Cyprus from the beginning of the 2nd millennium BCE.

=== Weights and measures ===
Several studies have found evidence for the existence of standardised units of weight and measurement in the Nordic Bronze Age.

=== Calendar ===
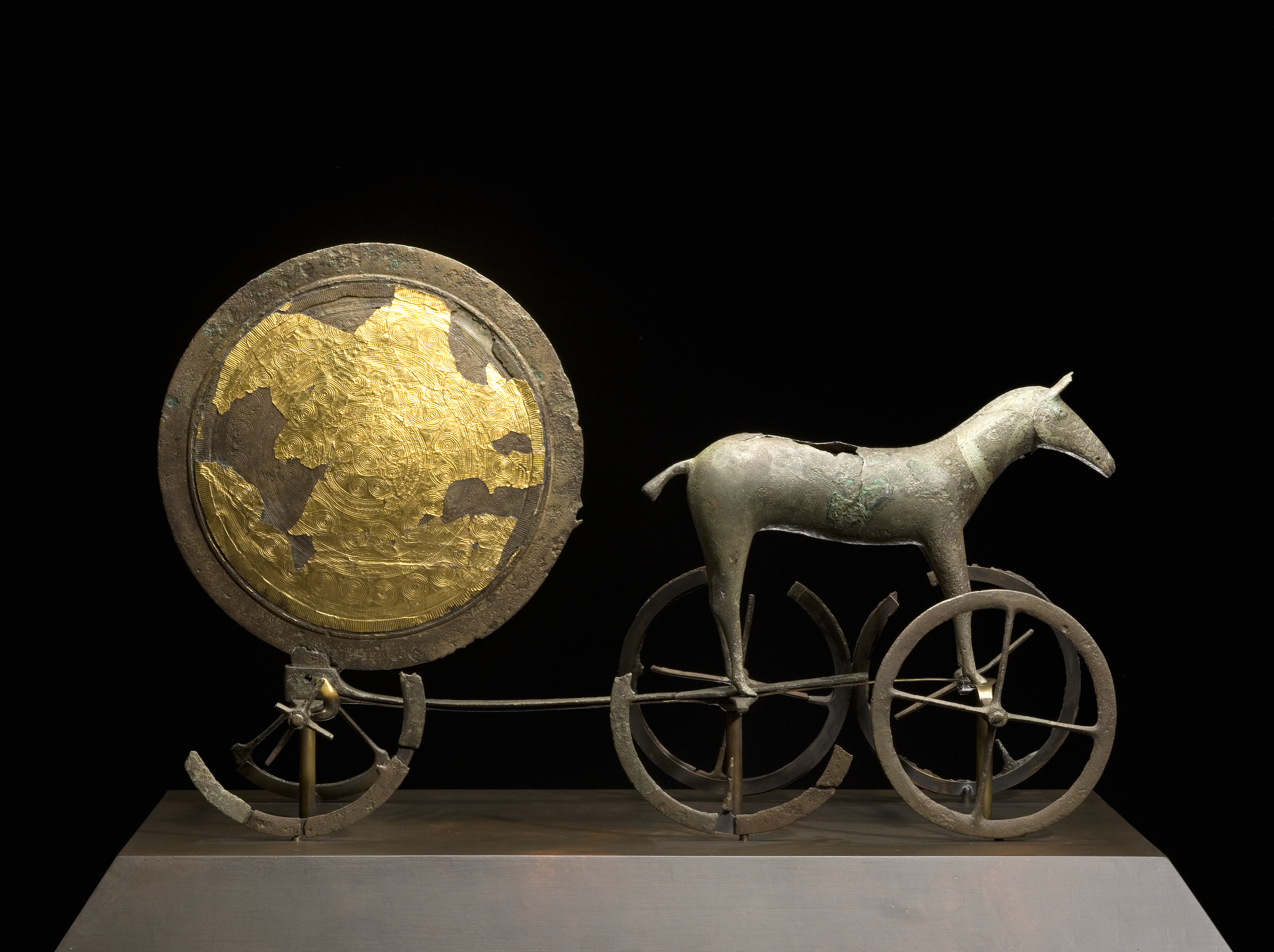
The Trundholm sun chariot, Denmark, c. 1500-1300 BC

Various authors have suggested that repeated motifs, symbols, stamps or markings found on certain Nordic Bronze Age artefacts numerically encode information related to astronomy and calendars. These artefacts include the disc of the Trundholm Sun Chariot, bronze belt plates (such as the Langstrup Belt Plate), gold bowls, bronze urns, the Balkåkra 'ritual object' and certain types of petroglyphs. These interpretations are related to similar analyses of objects from Central Europe such as the Nebra Sky Disc and Golden Hats, which are thought to encode similar information. These repeated symbols are often found on objects which invoke mythological imagery related to movements of the sun, such as the solar chariot, the solar boat, or the 'sun-bird-ship' motif.

The archaeologist Christoph Sommerfeld has argued that circular symbols on the Trundholm disc numerically encode knowledge of the 19-year lunisolar Metonic cycle, which may also be encoded on the Nebra Disc and Golden Hats. The archaeologist Mikkel Hansen has suggested that 'hand signs' and associated linear or circular markings found among Scandinavian petroglyphs are related to similar cast-markings found on bronze sickles from central Germany, notably from the Frankleben hoard, which are thought to represent a numeral system related to the lunar calendar.

A possible depiction of a tall conical hat on one of the stone stelae in the Kivik King's Grave, and other petroglyphs depicting individuals with tall conical hats, may be related to the conical Gold Hats from southern Germany and France, which are thought to have been worn by 'oracles' or 'king-priests' who had a knowledge of astronomy.

=== Religion and cult ===
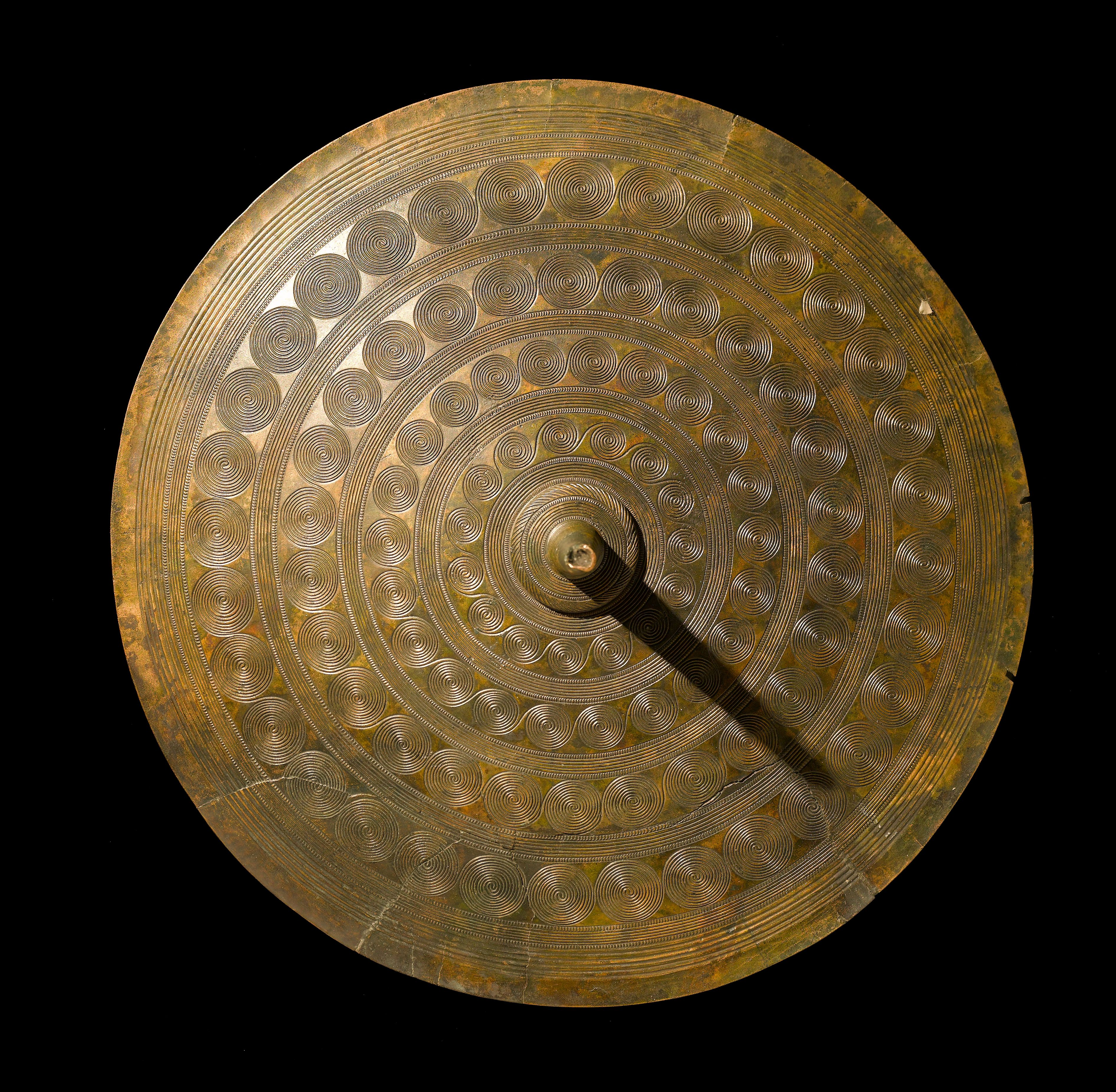
Langstrup belt plate, Denmark, 1400 BC.

There is no coherent knowledge about the Nordic Bronze Age religion, its pantheon, world view, and how it was practised. Written sources are lacking, but archaeological finds draw a vague and fragmented picture of the religious practices and the nature of the religion in this period. Only some possible sects and only certain possible tribes are known. Some of the best clues come from tumuli, elaborate artifacts, votive offerings, and rock carvings scattered across Northern Europe. There are many rock carving sites from this period. The rock carvings have been dated through comparison with depicted artifacts, for example bronze axes and swords. Many rock carvings are uncanny in resemblance to those found in the Corded Ware culture. There are also numerous Nordic Stone Age rock carvings, those of northern Scandinavia mostly portray elk.

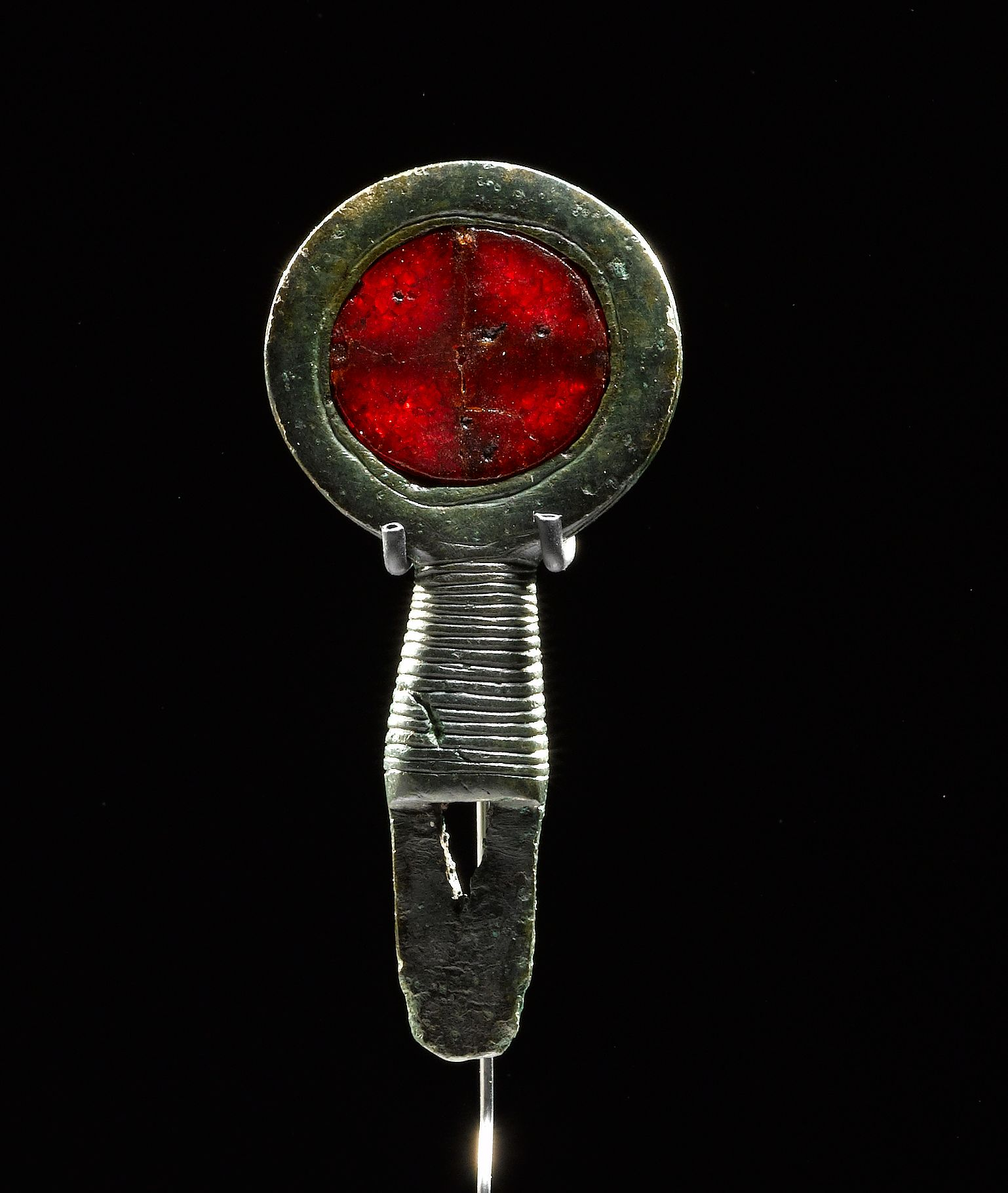
Amber sun cross, Denmark, c. 1200 BC

Many finds, especially rock carvings, indicate sun worship was central to the religion. The Sun, when personified, was conceived of as female and associated with various objects, like the swastika, sun cross, and boats, and animals such as horses, birds, snakes, and fish (see also Sól), though snakes may only have been associated with the Sun by one group of religious specialists, as seen on their razors; otherwise the myths depicted on rock carvings seem to indicate the opposite, that snakes were the enemy of the Sun. During the day, the Sun is thought to be transported by horse or by boat, then at night embarks a night ship to be transported in at night, switching for a day ship or horse afterwards, repeating this process every night and day in its journey.

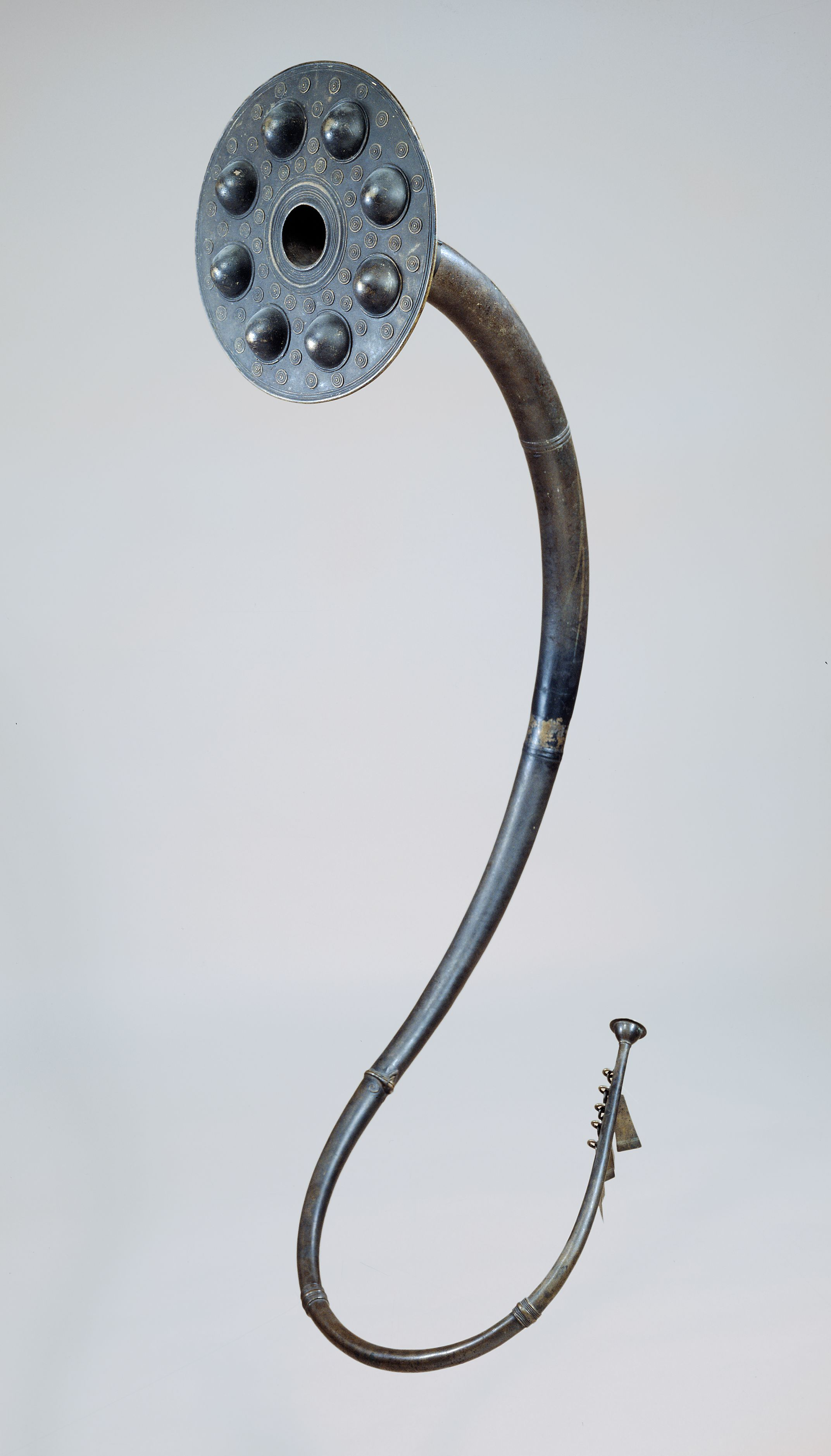
Bronze Lur from Denmark, c. 1000 BC

A pair of male twin gods are believed to have been worshiped in close conjunction with the sun goddess and were associated with objects such as lurs, horned helmets, and weapons, particularly axes and swords. Where sacrificial artifacts have been buried, they are often found in pairs and paired objects, like boats, are very common on rock carvings. The horned helmets found in sacrificial deposits are thought to be purely ceremonial and to have no practical function, i.e. in actual warfare. The Divine Twins are thought to be the protectors of the sun, ensuring its safe passage through the night so it can rise again in the morning and make its usual path across the daylit sky, repeating this every night and day.

Jeanette Varberg has proposed, in light of archaeological evidence pairing horse gear with women's ornaments (and wagons), that there may have been a goddess associated with war and horses that was worshiped in the Late Bronze Age which she calls the Lady of the Battle and of the Horse.

Sacrifices, including of animals, weapons, jewellery, and humans, often had a strong connection to bodies of water. Water bodies such as bogs, ponds, streams, and lakes were often used as ceremonial and holy places for sacrifices and many artifacts have been found in such locations. Ritual instruments such as bronze lurs have been uncovered, especially in the region of Denmark and western Sweden. Lurs are also depicted in several rock carvings and are believed to have been used in ceremonies.

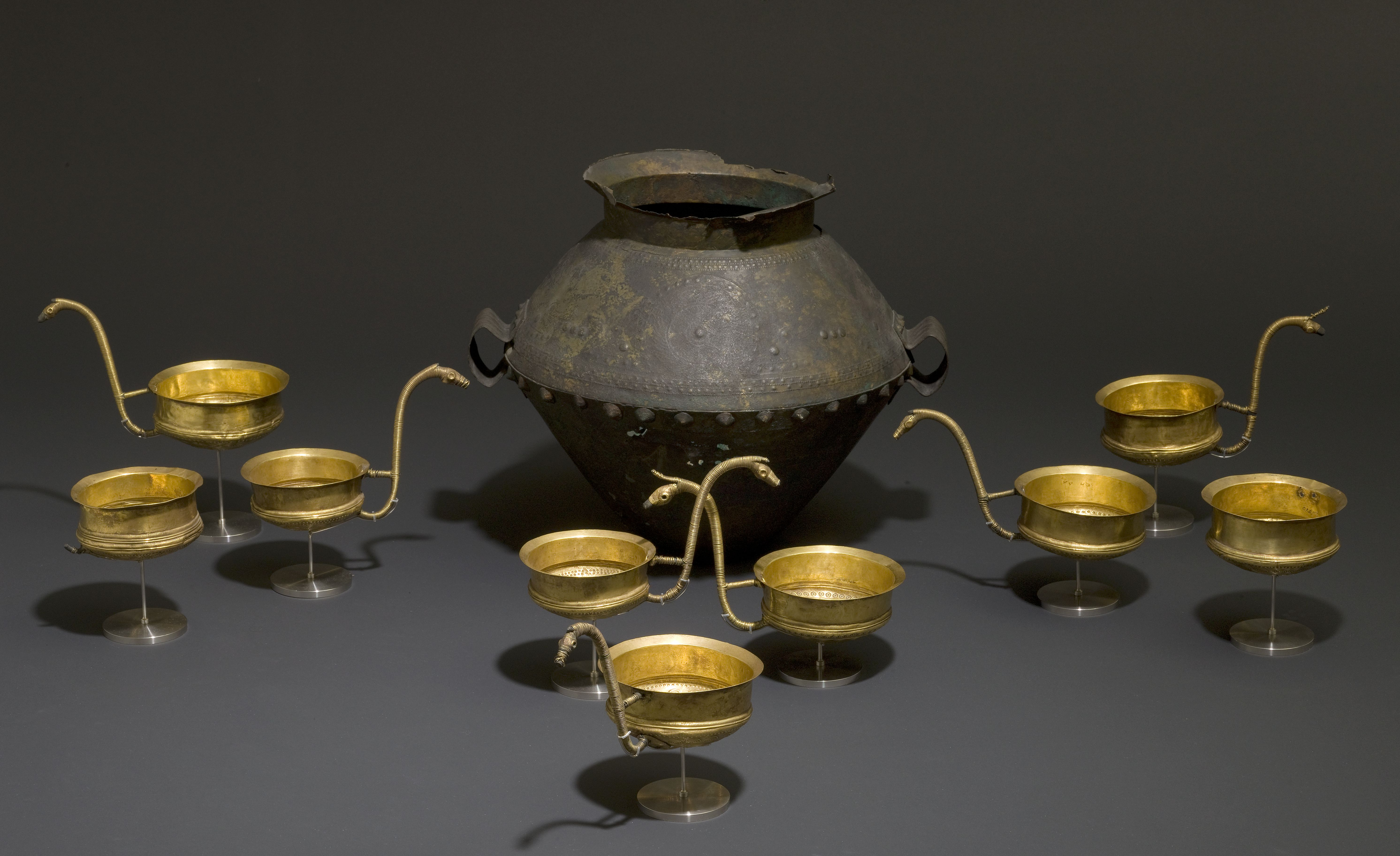
Bronze amphora and golden bowls from Funen, Denmark, c. 1000 BC

Nordic Bronze Age religion and mythology is believed to be mostly Indo-European in character and to itself be the ancestor to Norse mythology and religion and wider Germanic mythology and religion.

Similarities have been noted between Nordic Bronze Age imagery and the Nebra Sky Disc from central Germany associated with the Únětice culture. Harald Meller has suggested that the Nebra hoard, with its depictions of the sun, ship, and serpents "contains all the elements of a mythological narrative ... which would be depicted thousands of times centuries later in the visual world of the Nordic Bronze Age, above all in rock art."

It has been suggested that certain petroglyphs known as cupmarks may have been used for divination.

=== Seamanship ===
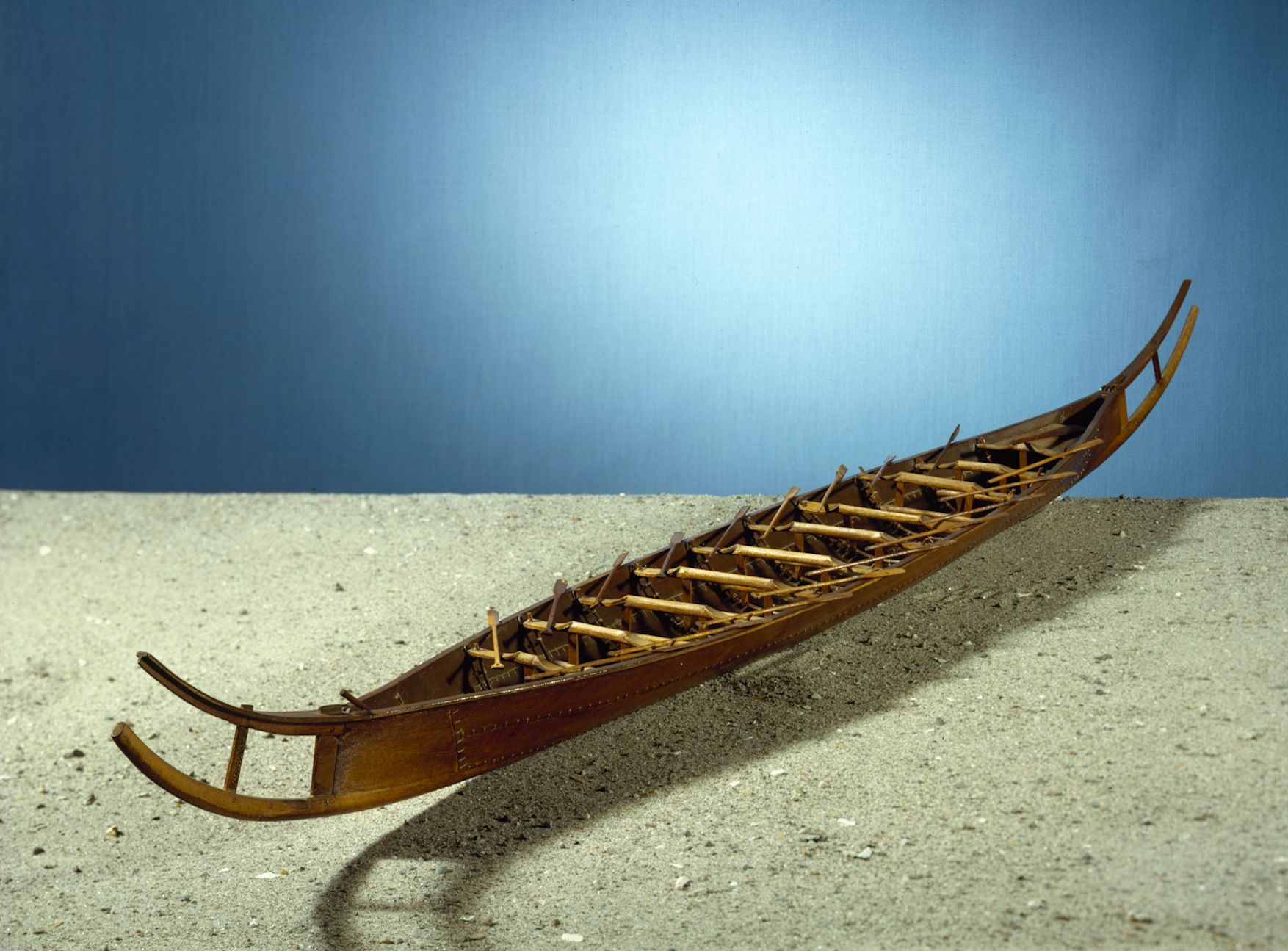
Model of the Hjortspring boat, c. 400 BC, which closely resembles Bronze Age petroglyphs

Thousands of rock carvings from the Nordic Bronze Age depict ships, and the large stone burial monuments known as stone ships. Those sites suggest that ships and seafaring played an important role in the culture at large. The depicted ships, most likely represents sewn plank built canoes used for warfare, fishing and trade. These ship types may have their origin as far back as the Neolithic period and they continue into the Pre-Roman Iron Age, as exemplified by the Hjortspring boat. 3,600-year-old bronze axes and other tools made from Cypriot copper have been found in the region.

Researchers note that there is great continuity in the way that ships continuously had a strong importance in Scandinavian society. The boat building and seafaring traditions that were established during the Nordic Bronze Age lasted throughout the ages and were further developed upon during the Iron Age. Some archaeologists and historians believe that the culmination of this sea-focused culture was the Viking Age.

== Climate ==
The Nordic Bronze Age was initially characterized by a warm climate that began with a climate change around 2700 BC. The climate was comparable to that of present-day central Germany and northern France and permitted a fairly dense population and good opportunities for farming; for example, grapes were grown in Scandinavia at this time. A minor change in climate occurred between 850 BC and 760 BC, introducing a wetter, colder climate and a more radical climate change began around 650 BC.

== Genetics ==
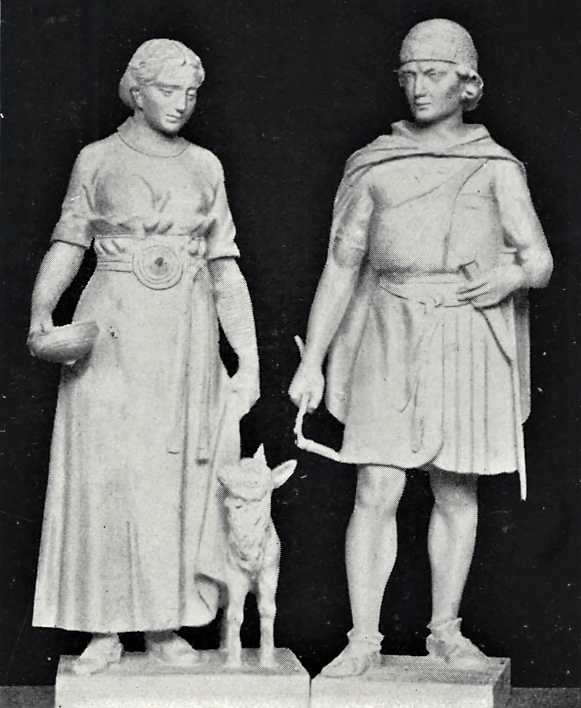
Model reconstruction of a Nordic Bronze Age couple

A June 2015 study published in Nature found the people of the Nordic Bronze Age to be closely genetically related to the Corded Ware culture, the Beaker culture and the Únětice culture. People of the Nordic Bronze Age and Corded Ware show the highest lactose tolerance among Bronze Age Europeans. The study suggested that the Sintashta culture, and its succeeding Andronovo culture, represented an eastward migration of Corded Ware peoples.

In the June 2015 study, the remains of nine individuals of the Northern Bronze Age and earlier Neolithic cultures in Denmark and Sweden from ca. 2850 BC to 500 BC, were analyzed. Among the Neolithic individuals, the three males were found to be carrying haplogroup I1, R1a1a1 and R1b1a1a2a1a1. Among the individuals from the Nordic Bronze Age, two males carried I1, while two carried R1b1a1a2.

A 2024 study published in Nature analyzed around 40 individuals from Late Neolithic and Bronze Age Southern Scandinavia. The study found evidence for three distinct genetic clusters:

LNBA phase I - Dated to 4,600 and 4,300 cal. bp and archaeologically associated with the Battle Axe culture and early Single Grave culture. The males in the LNBA phase I cluster belonged to haplogroup R1a.

LNBA phase II - Dated to 4,300–3,700 cal. bp and archaeologically associated with the Flint Dagger period (c. 2300-2000 BC). The males in the LNBA phase II cluster belonged to haplogroup R1b.

LNBA phase III - A final stage from around 4,000 cal. bp onwards, in which a distinct cluster of Scandinavian individuals dominated by males with I1 Y-haplogroups appears. Archaeologically associated with a migration of people from the north or northeast and the emergence of stone cist burials, leading to the start of the Nordic Bronze Age. The study found that the LNBA phase III cluster forms the predominant source in supervised ancestry modelling for future populations in Iron Age Scandinavia and Viking Age Scandinavia, as well as non-Scandinavian populations with Scandinavian or Germanic association, for example Anglo-Saxons, Goths and Langobards. These findings are in accordance with the archaeological and linguistic associations of the Nordic Bronze Age with early Germanic speakers. 'Paleo-Germanic' is believed to have been spoken in Scandinavia during the Bronze Age, evolving into Proto-Germanic by the early Iron Age.

== Gallery ==
=== Artefacts ===
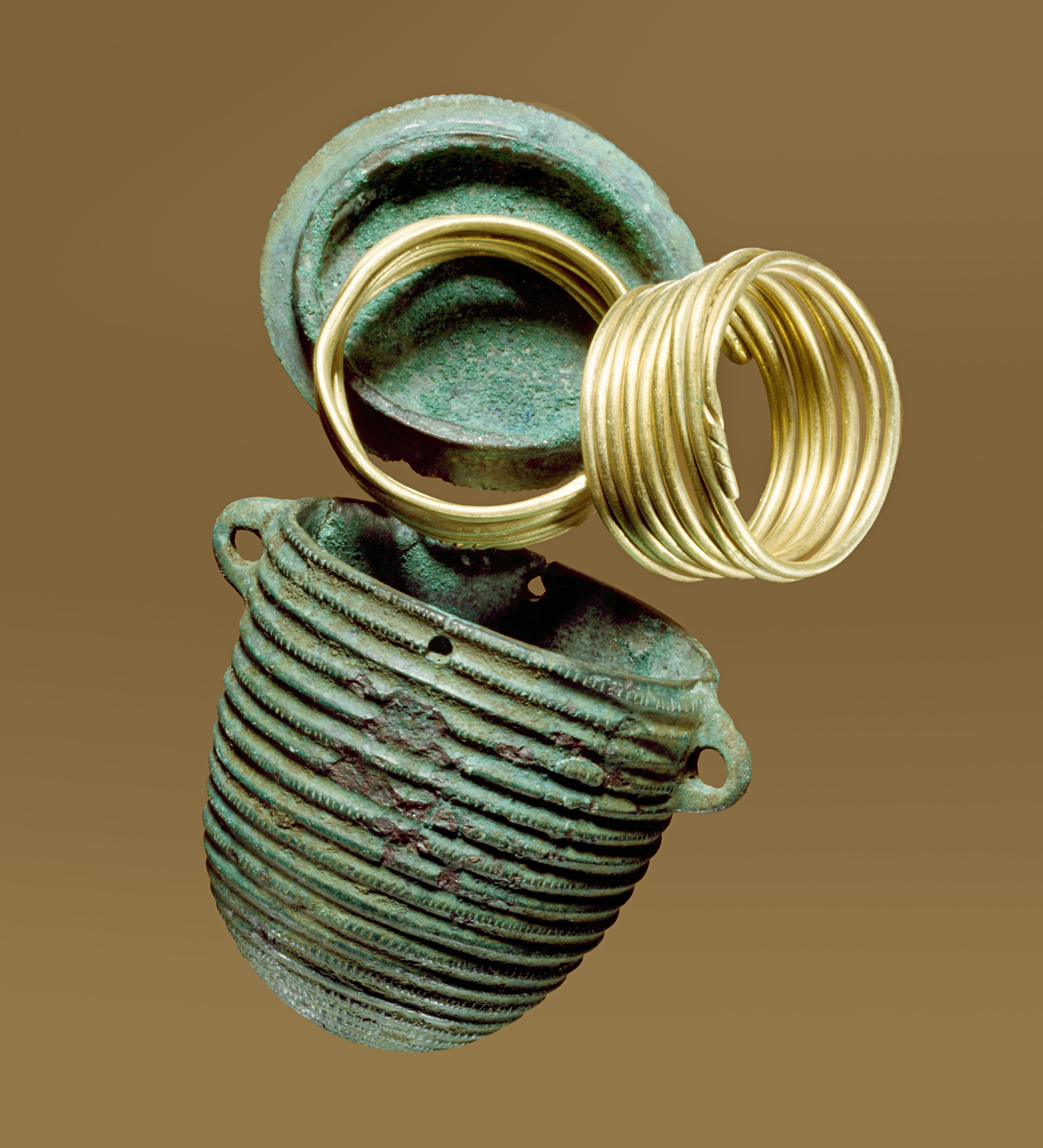
Bronze box with gold rings from Skeldal, Denmark, 1950-1700 BC

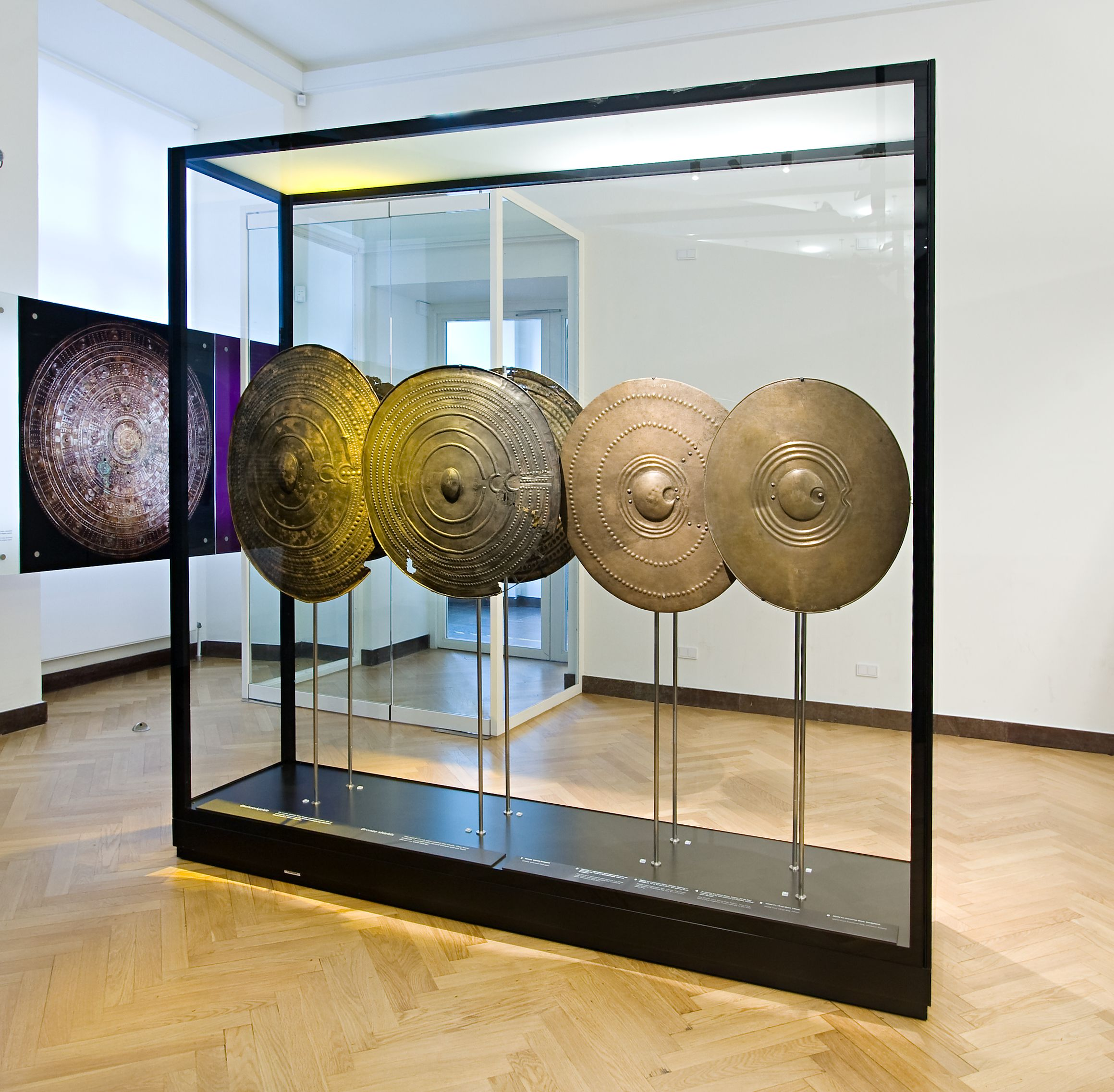
Bronze shields from Denmark and Sweden

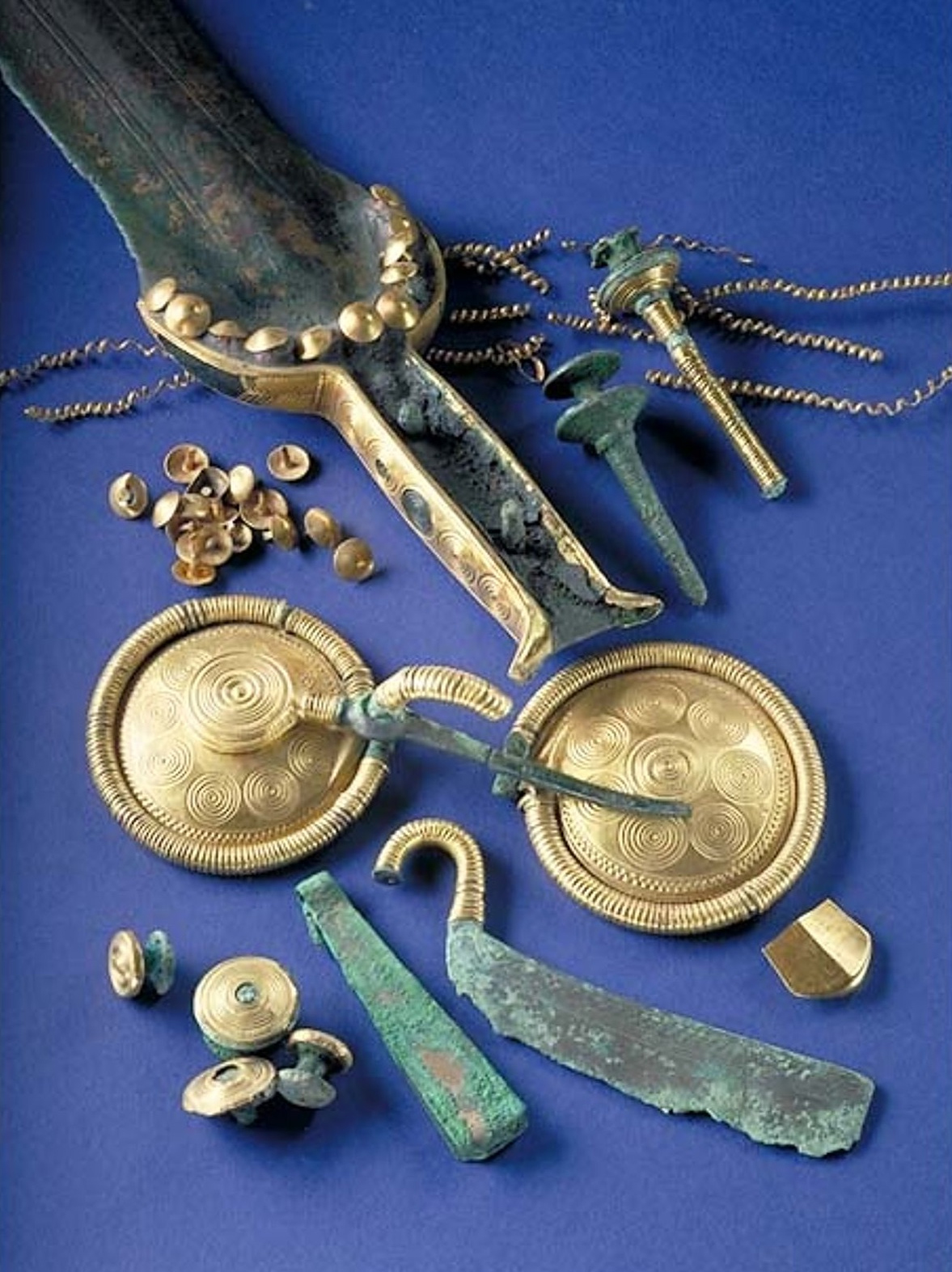
Grave goods, Håga mound, c. 1000 BC

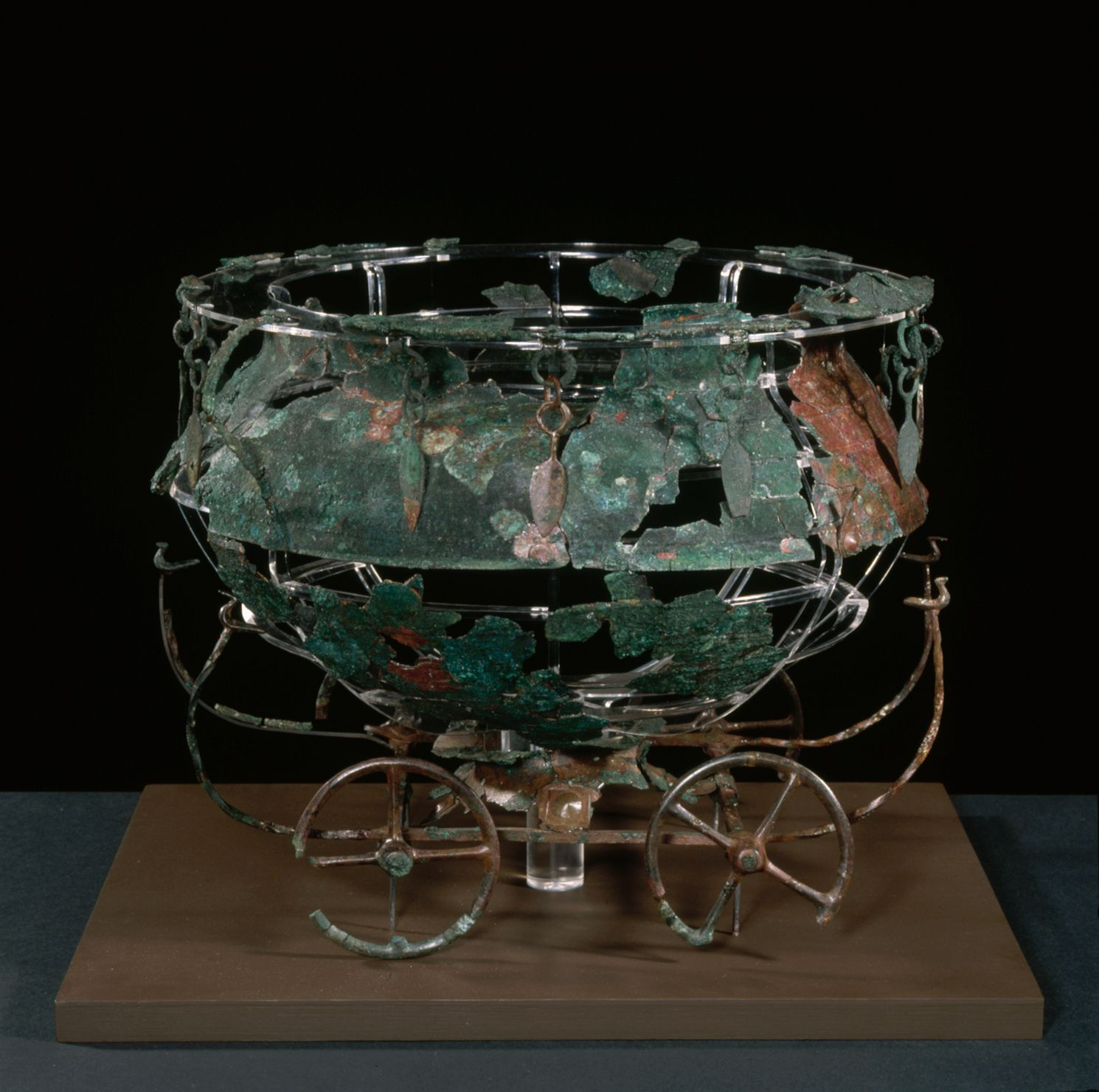
Skallerup vessel, Denmark, 1300-1100 BC

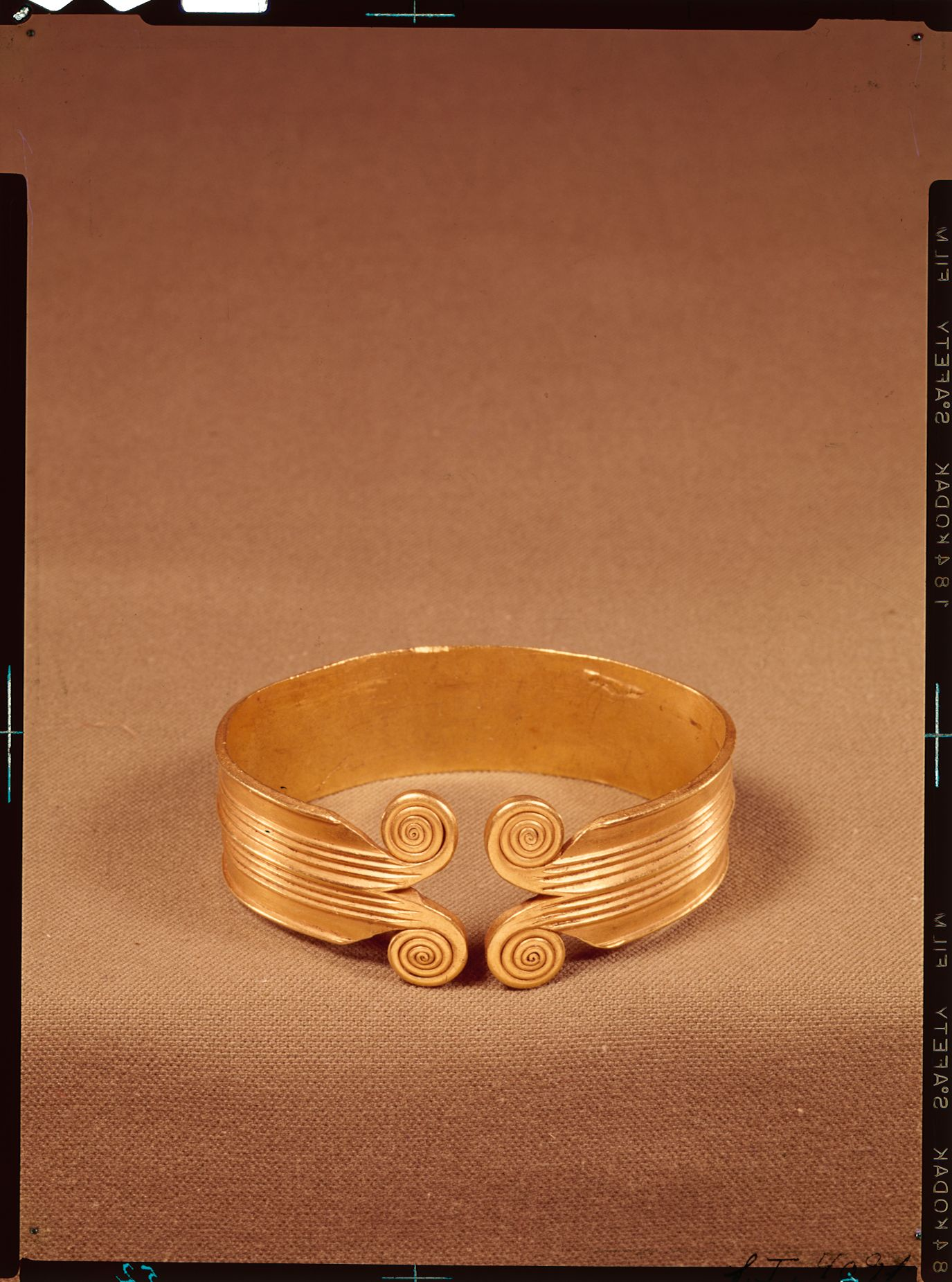
Gold bracelet, Denmark

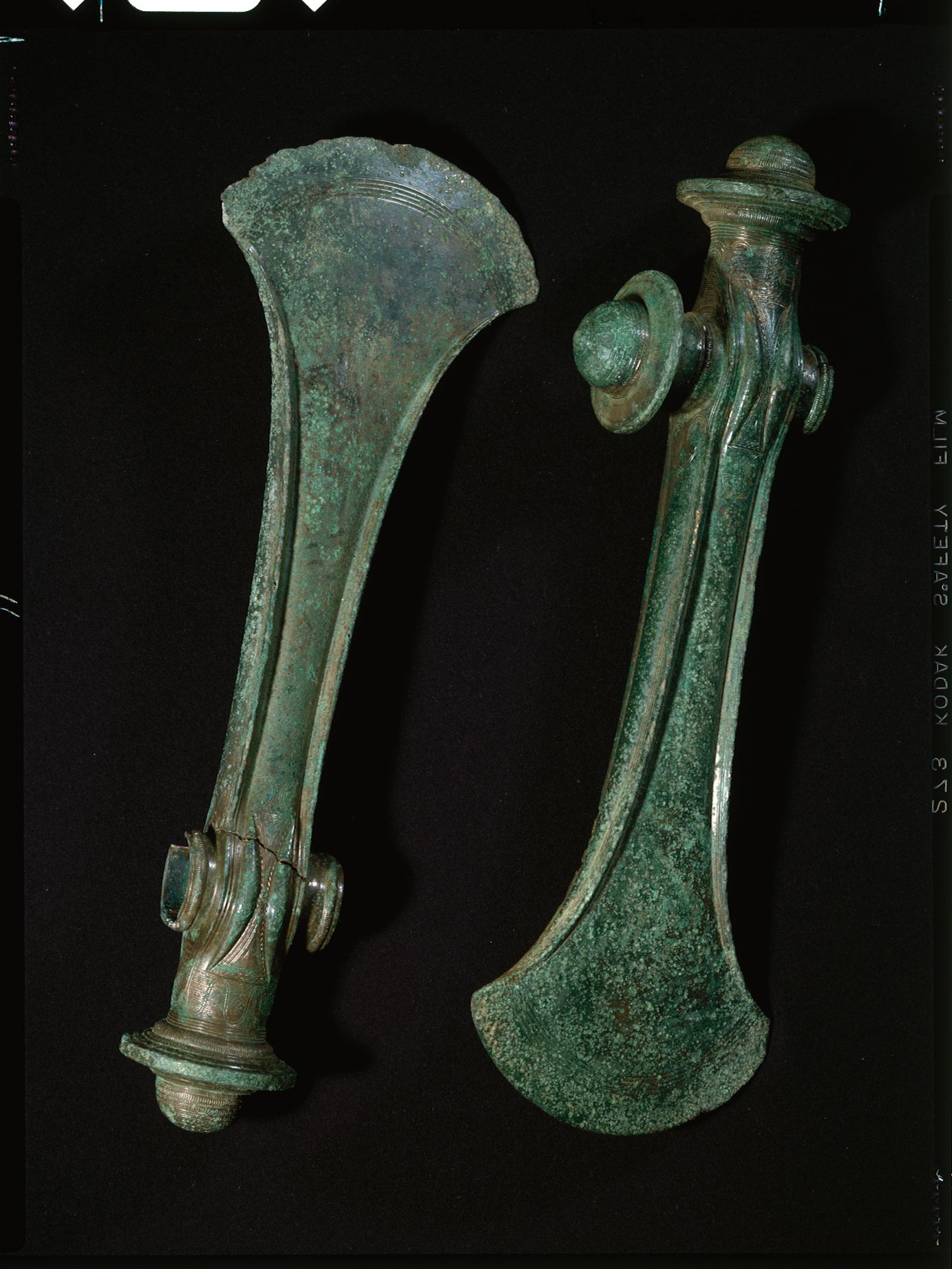
Bronze axes, Denmark.

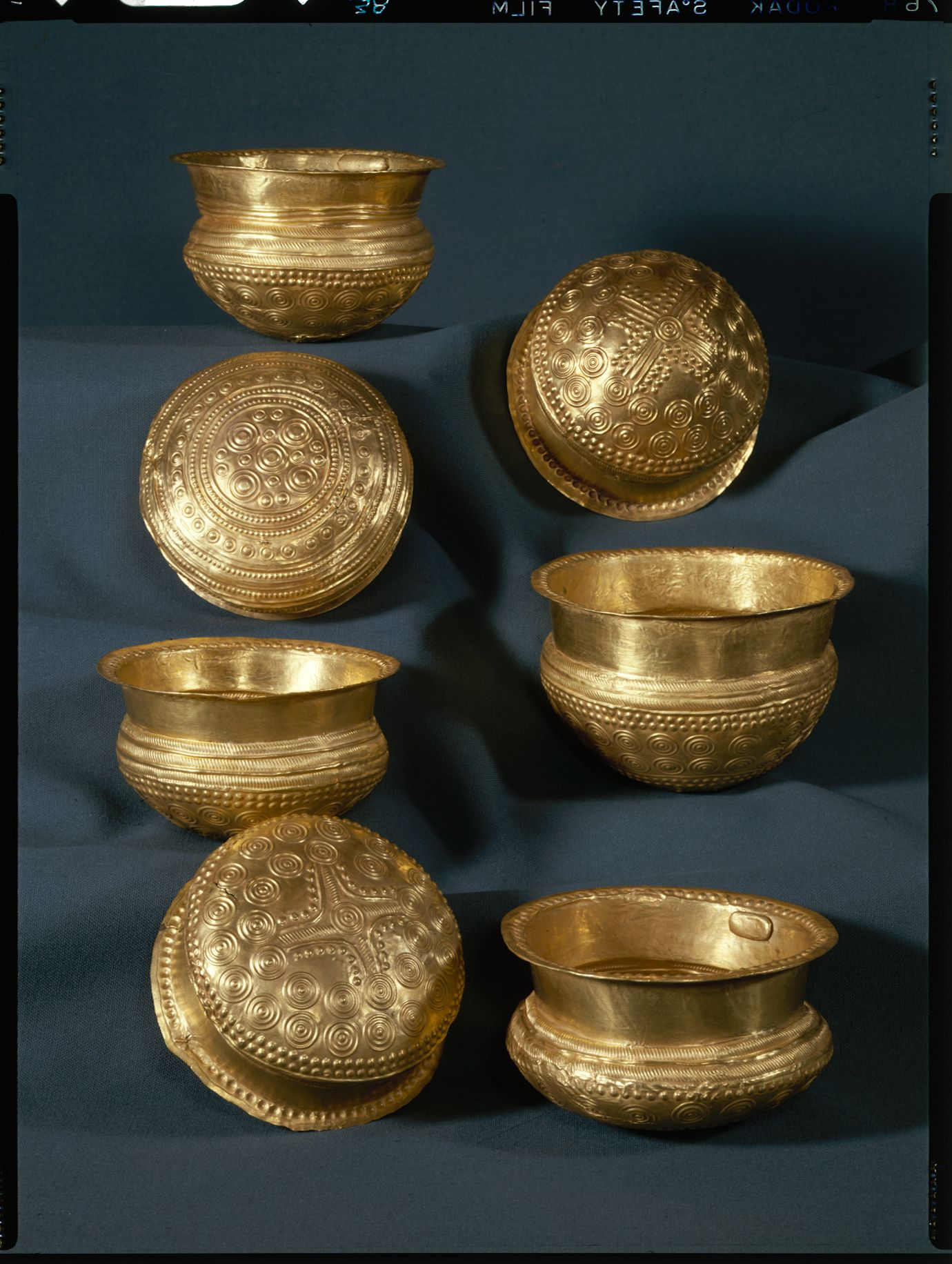
Gold bowls, Denmark, 1000-800 BC

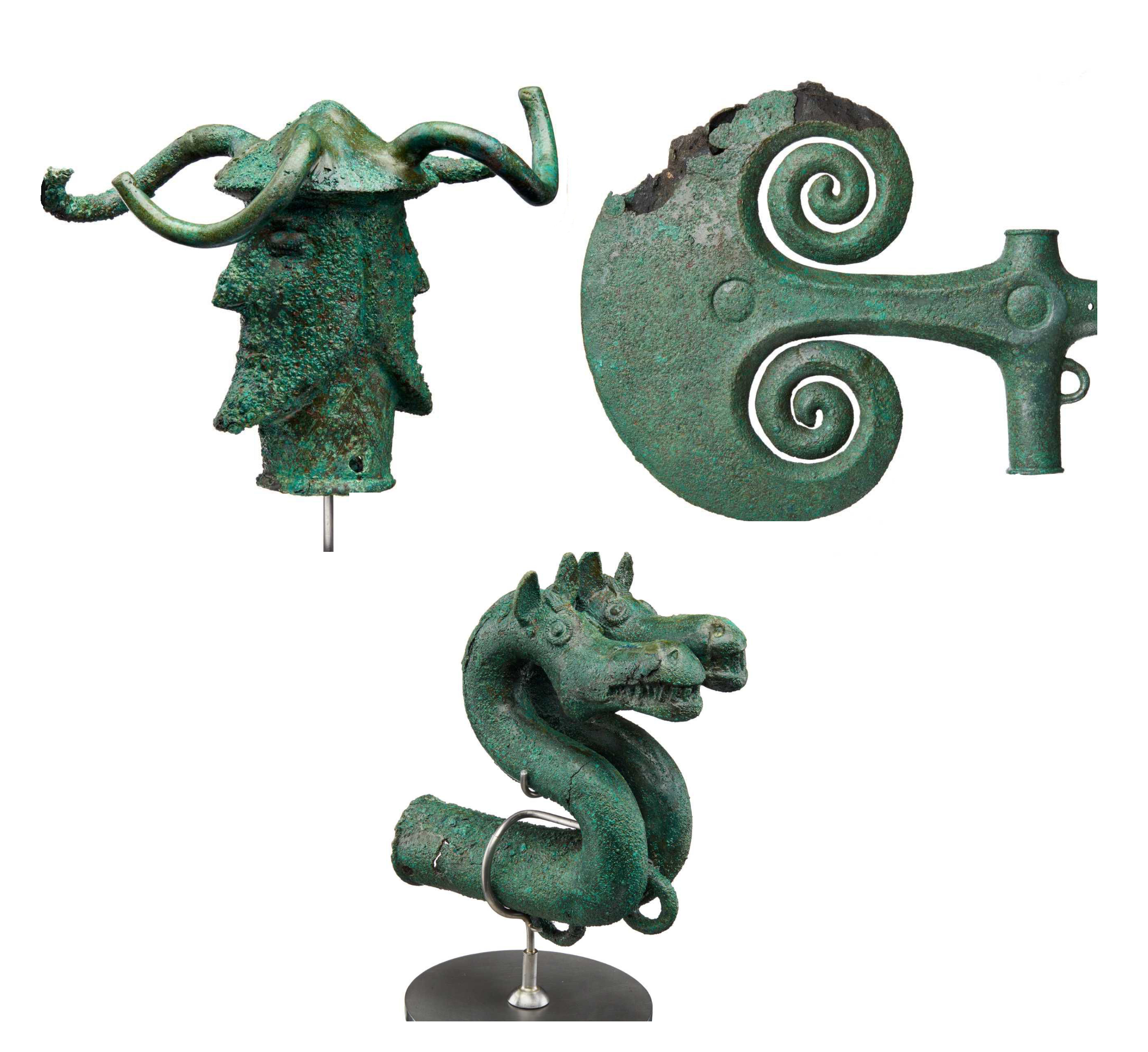
Kallerup hoard, Denmark, 1200-1000 BC

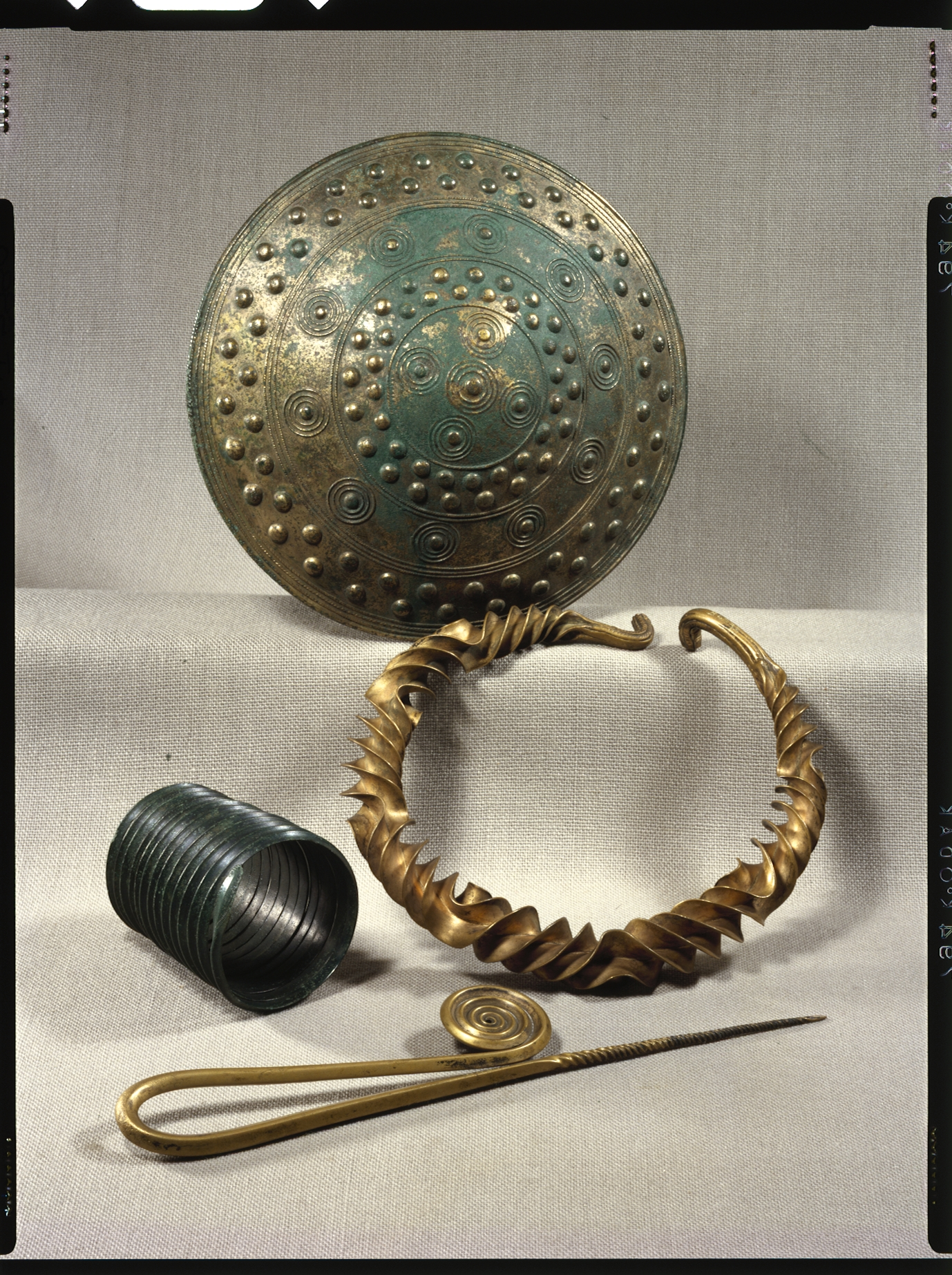
Bronze and gold votive items.

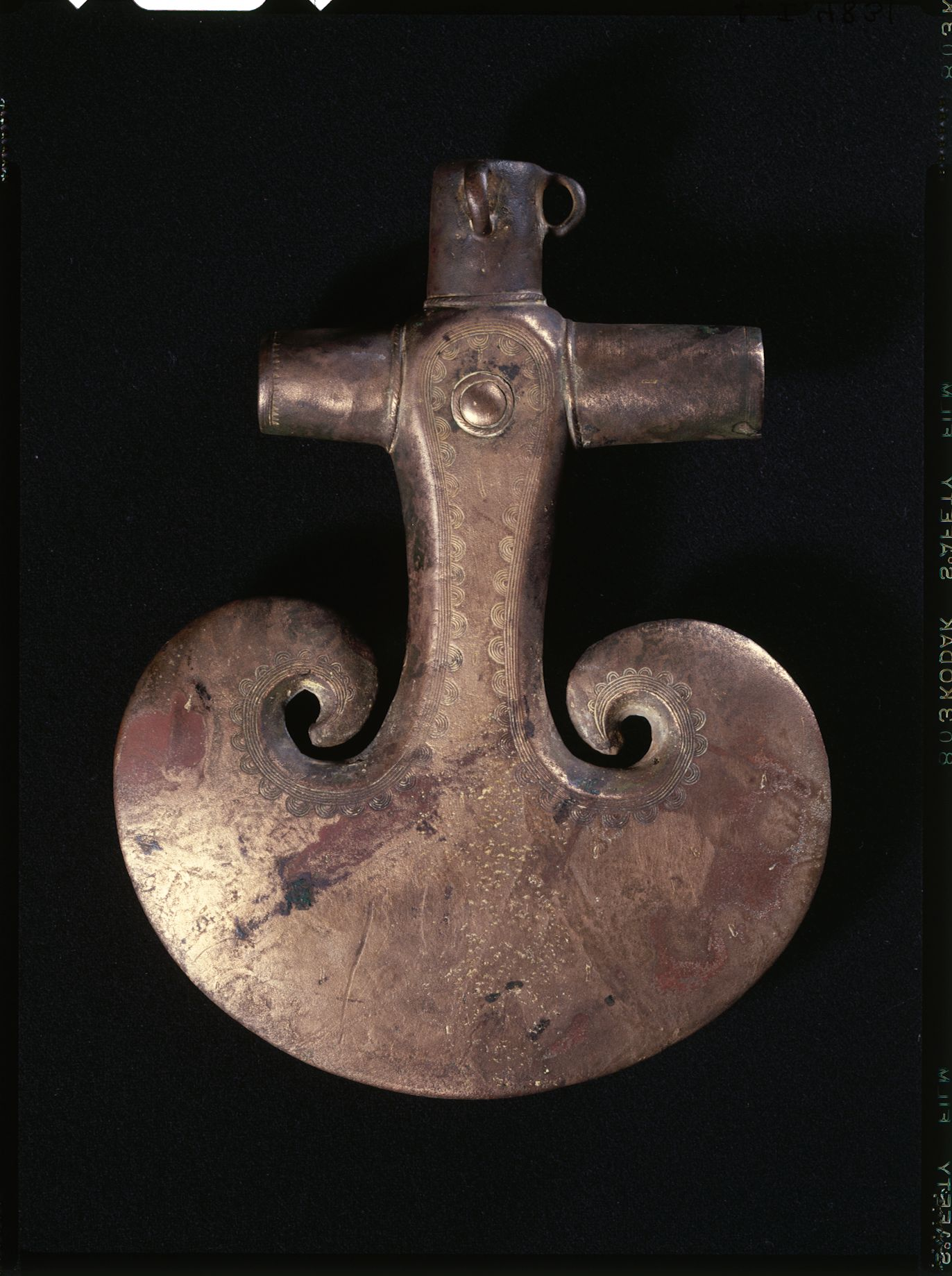
Ceremonial axe, Denmark, after c. 1100 BC.

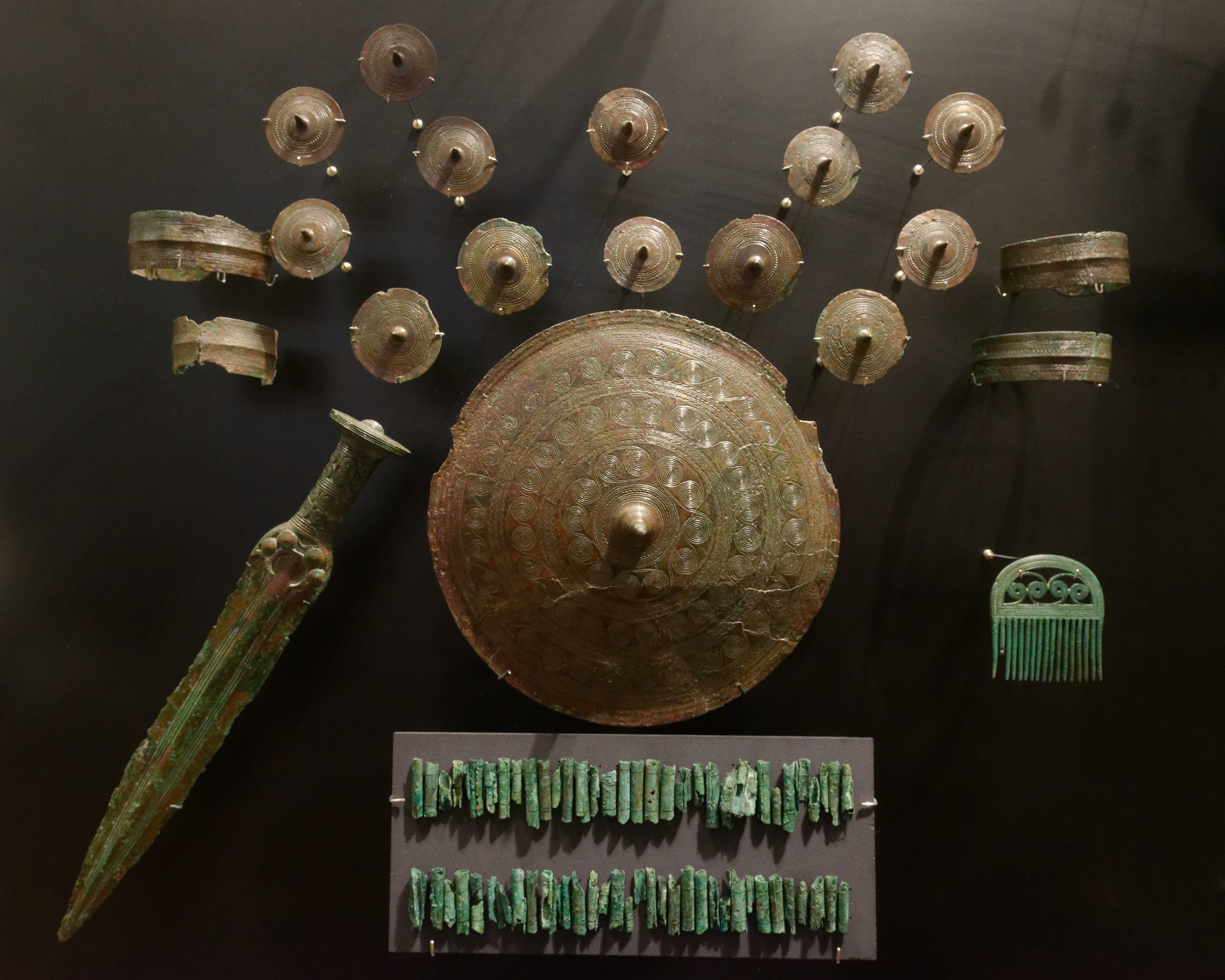
Grave goods from Hverrus, Denmark, 1400 BC

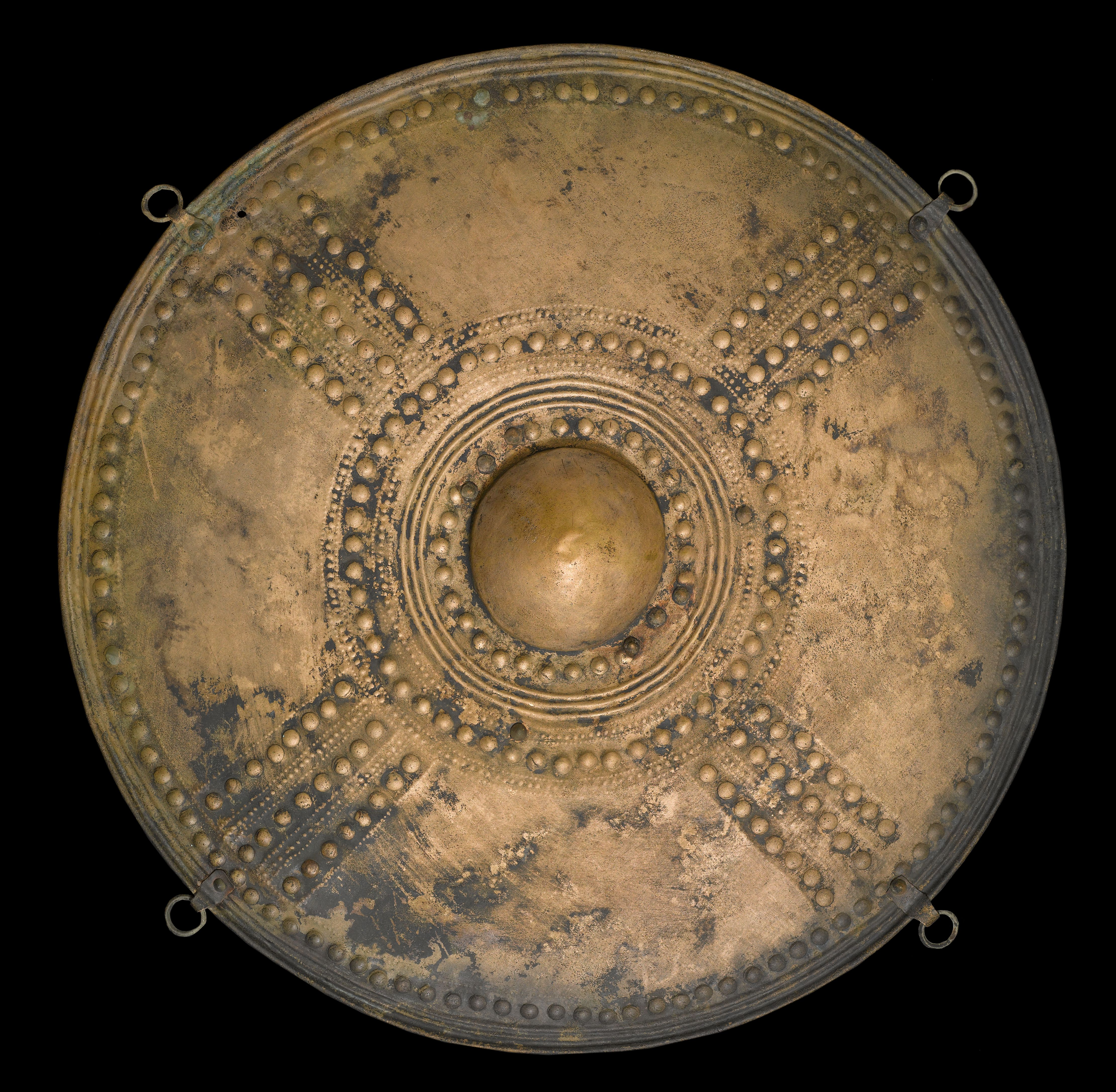
Bronze shield from Sørup, Denmark

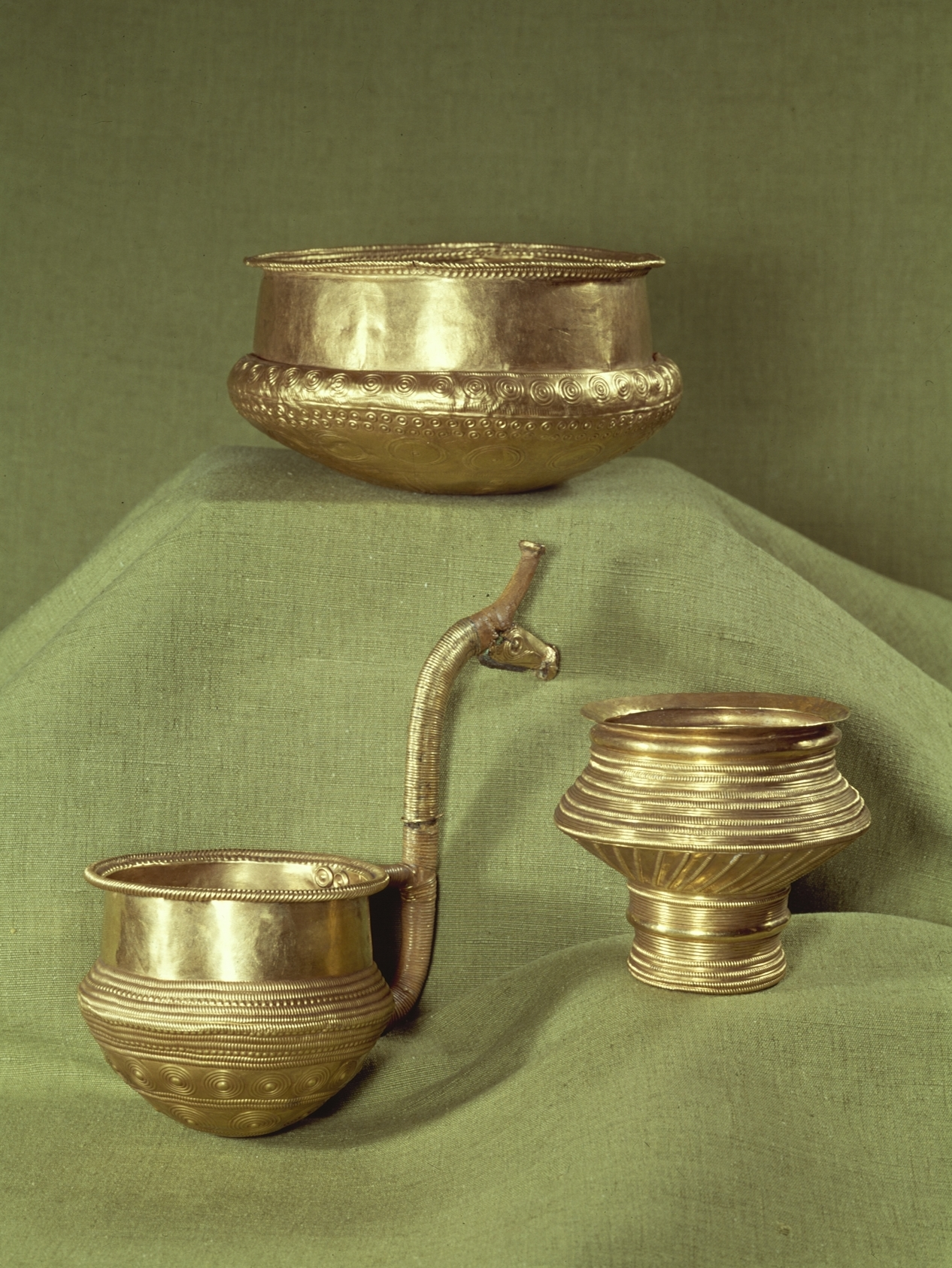
Golden vessels from Borgbjerg, Denmark

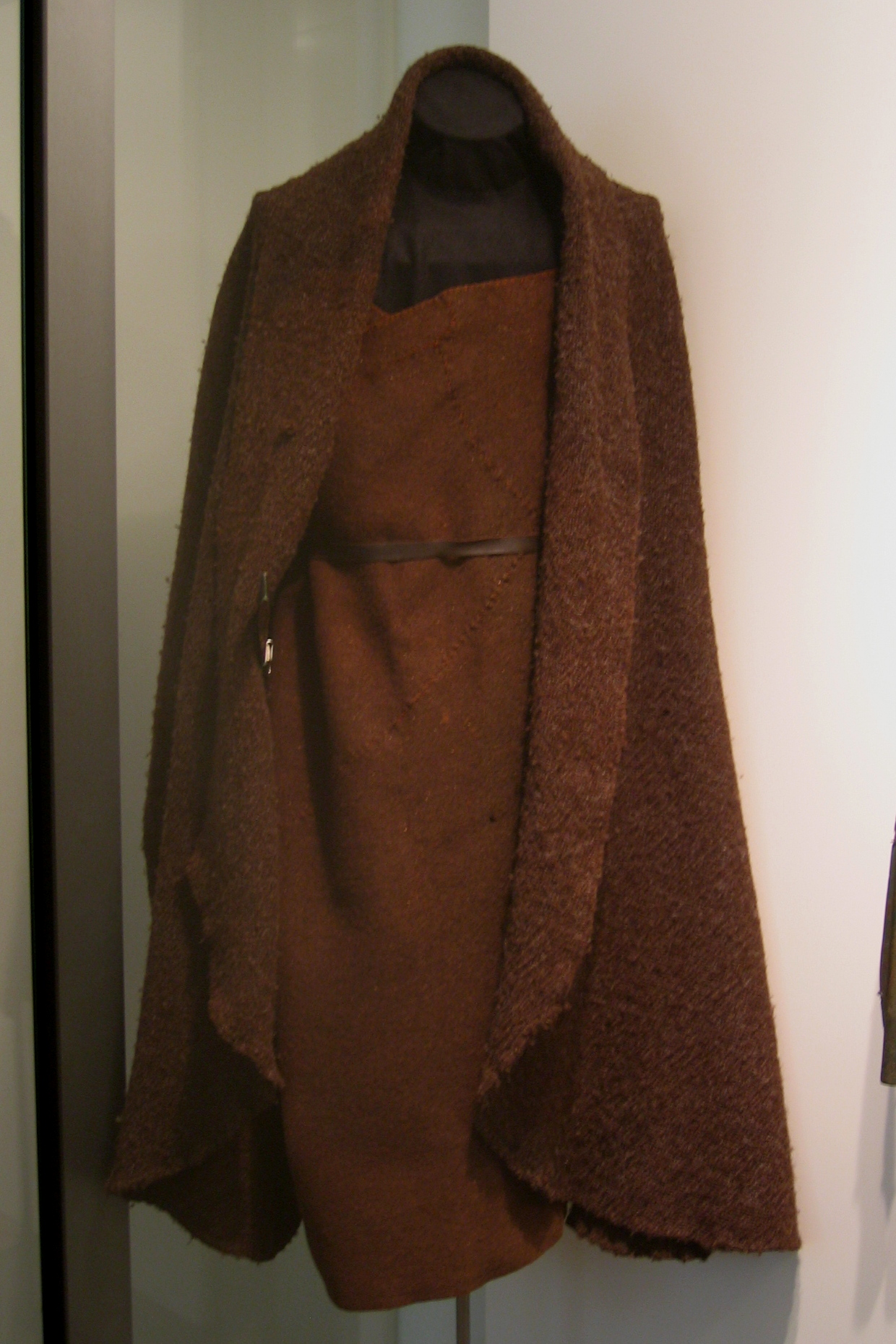
Trindhøj man wool clothing, Denmark, c. 1350 BC

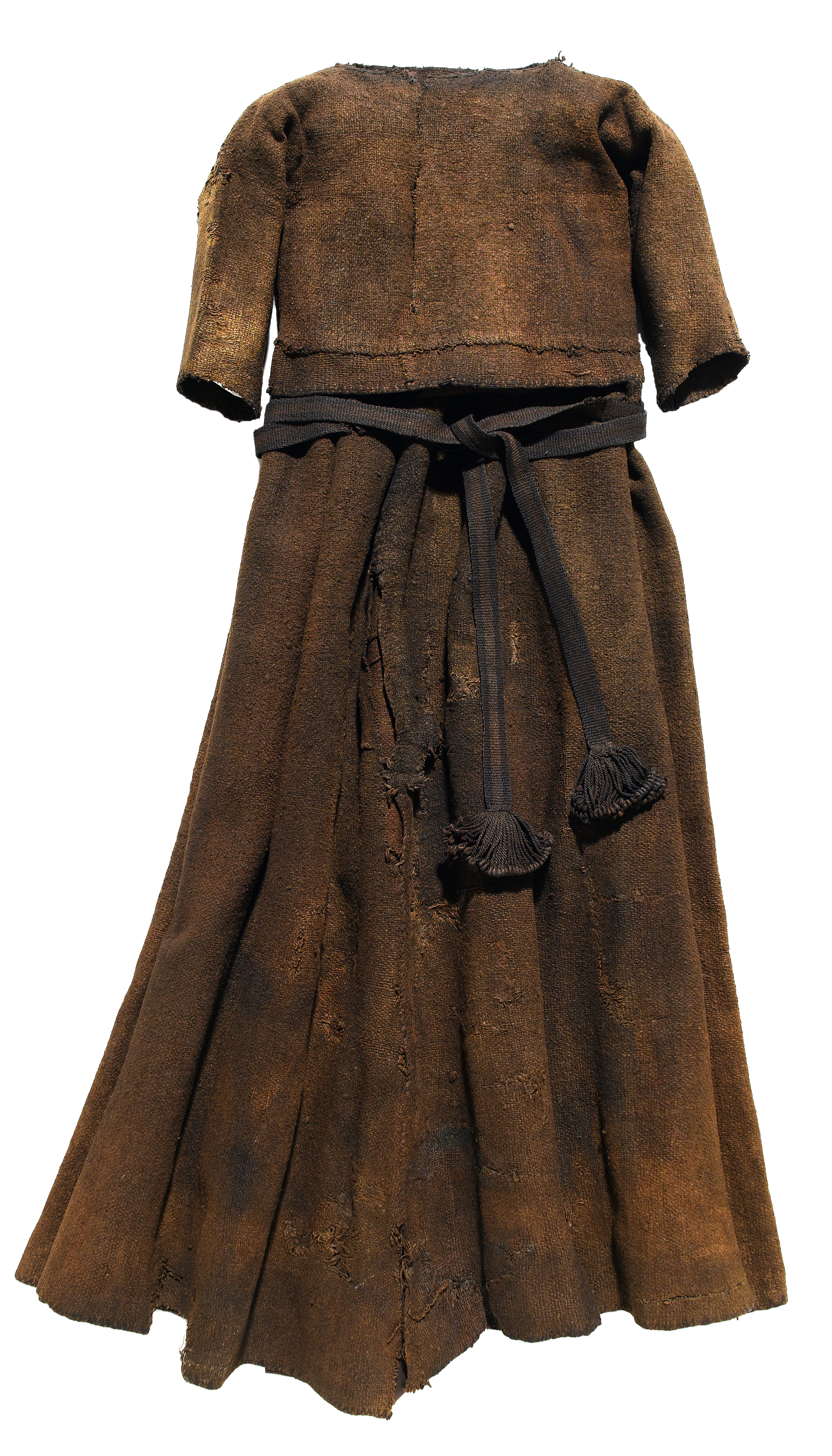
Clothes from Borum Eshøj, c. 1350 BC

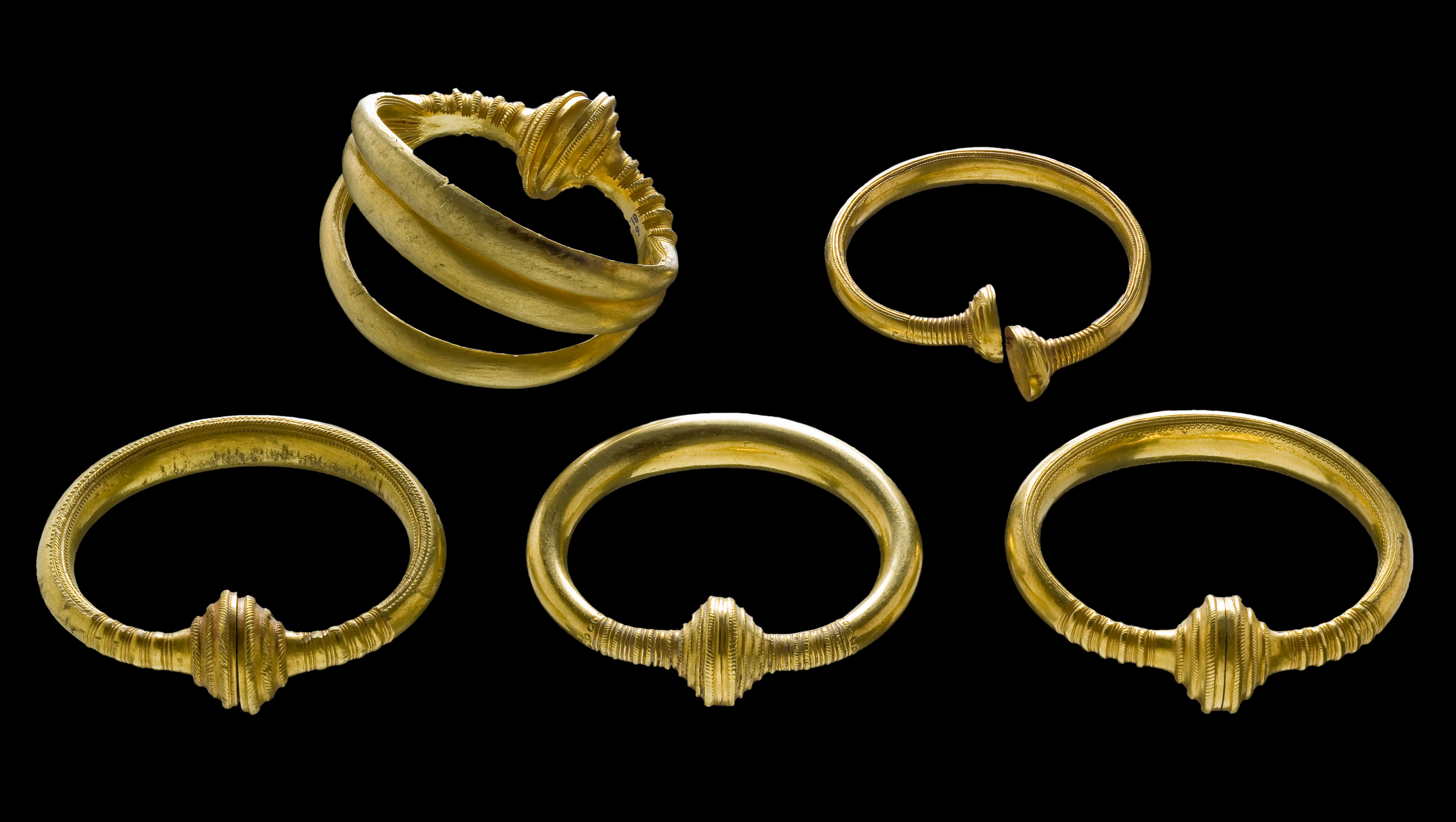
Gold rings, Denmark

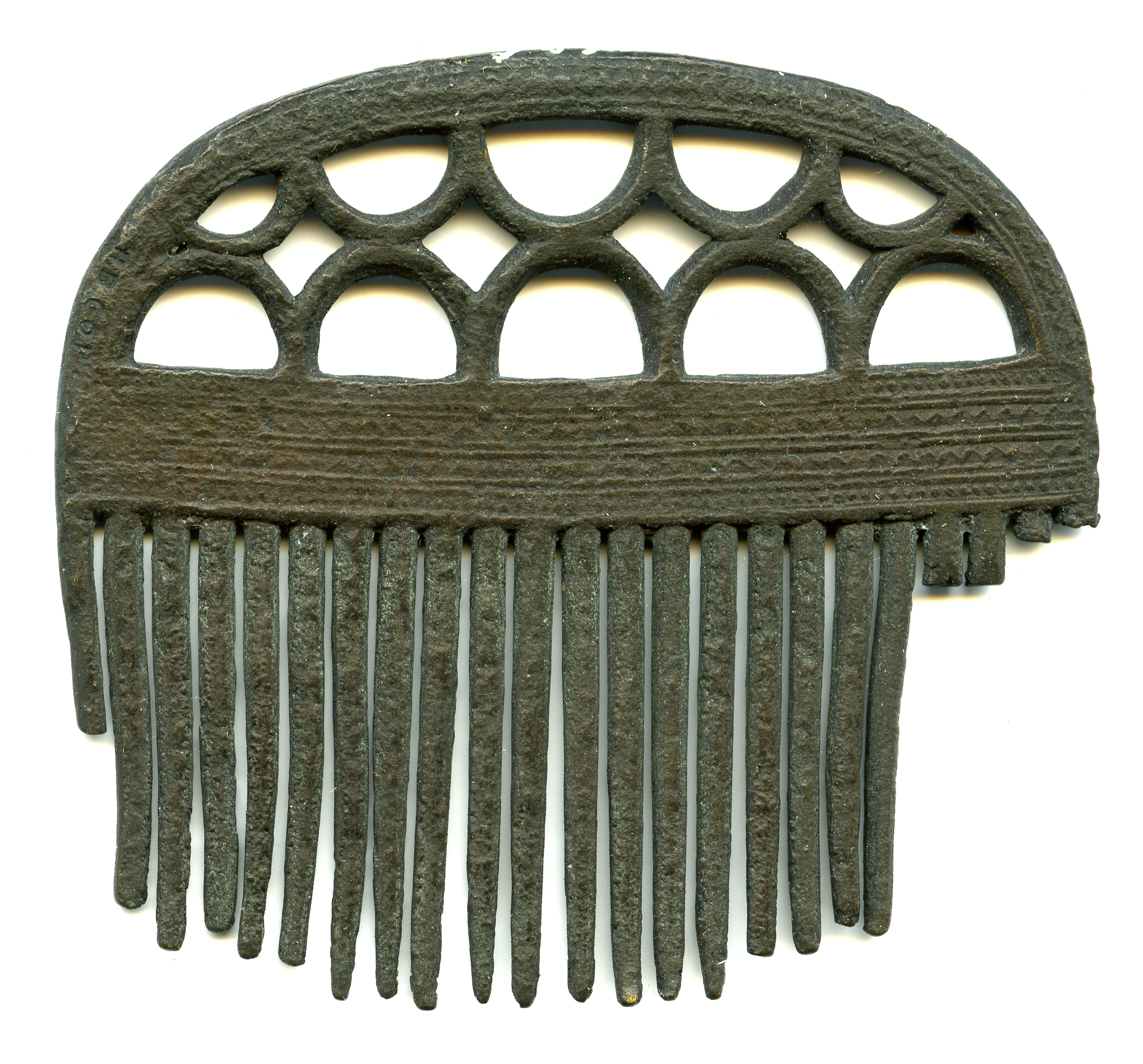
Bronze combs. Gotland, Sweden

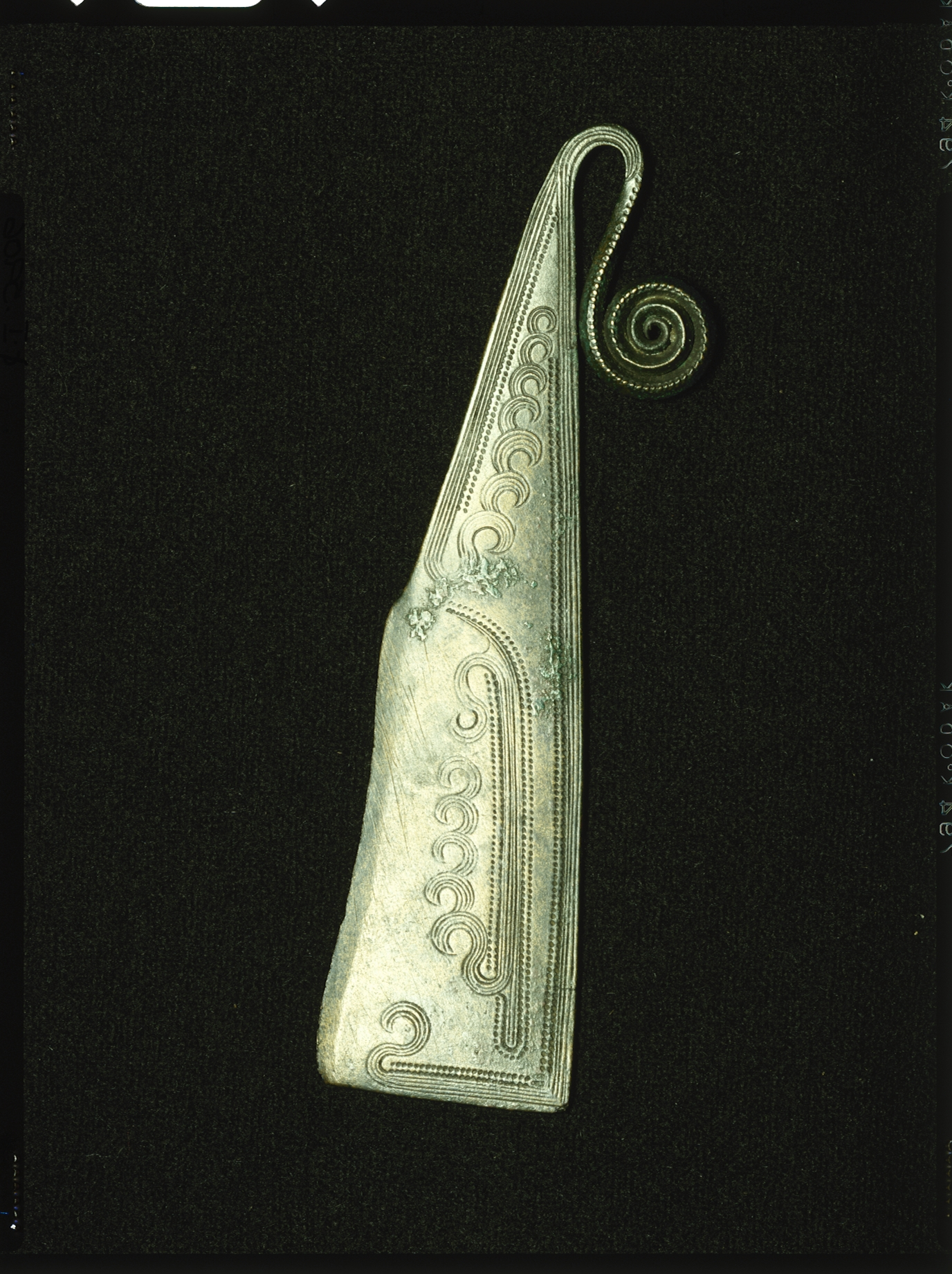
Bronze razor for shaving. Scania, Sweden

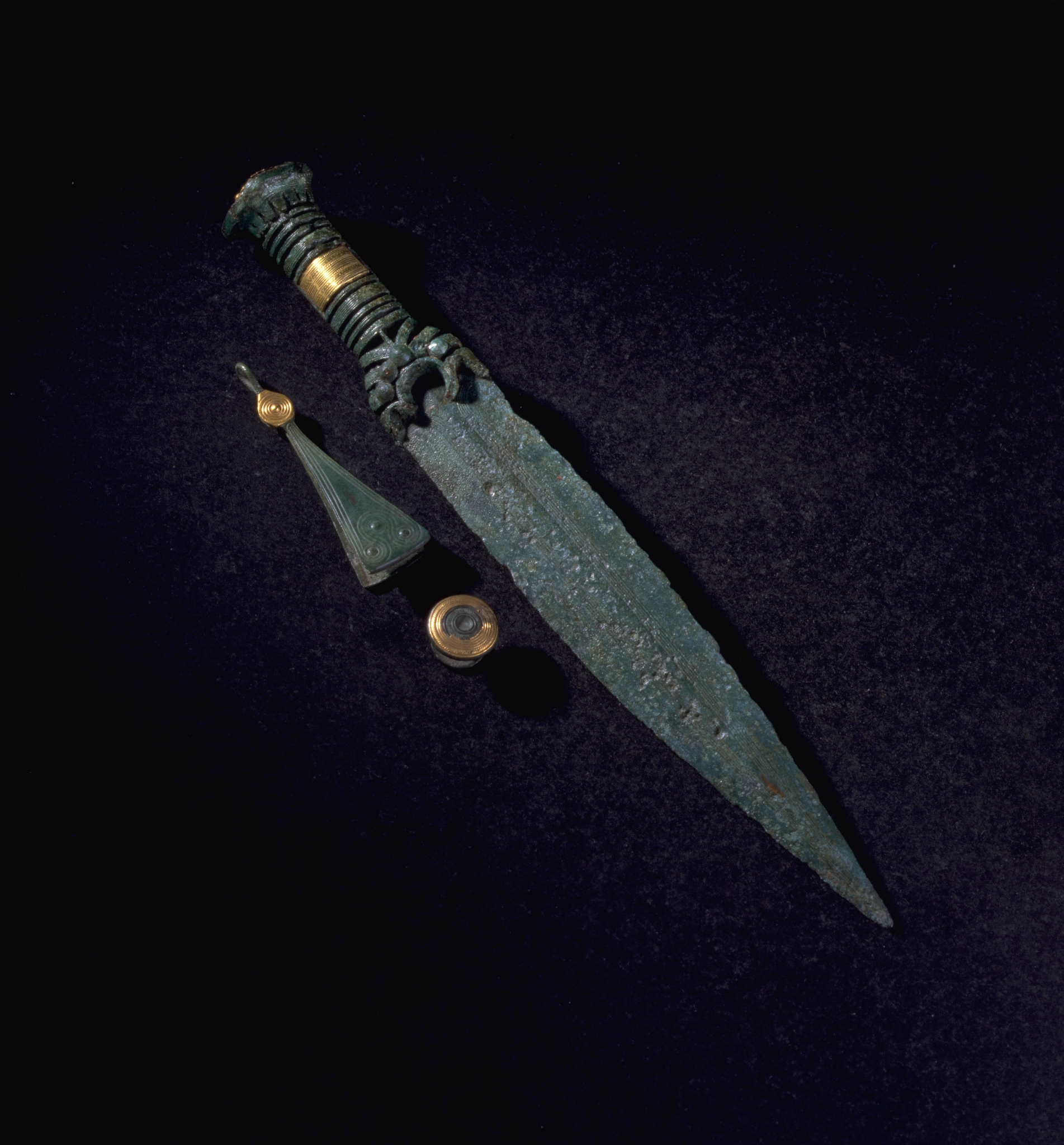
Dagger, tweezers and button with gold decoration, Sweden

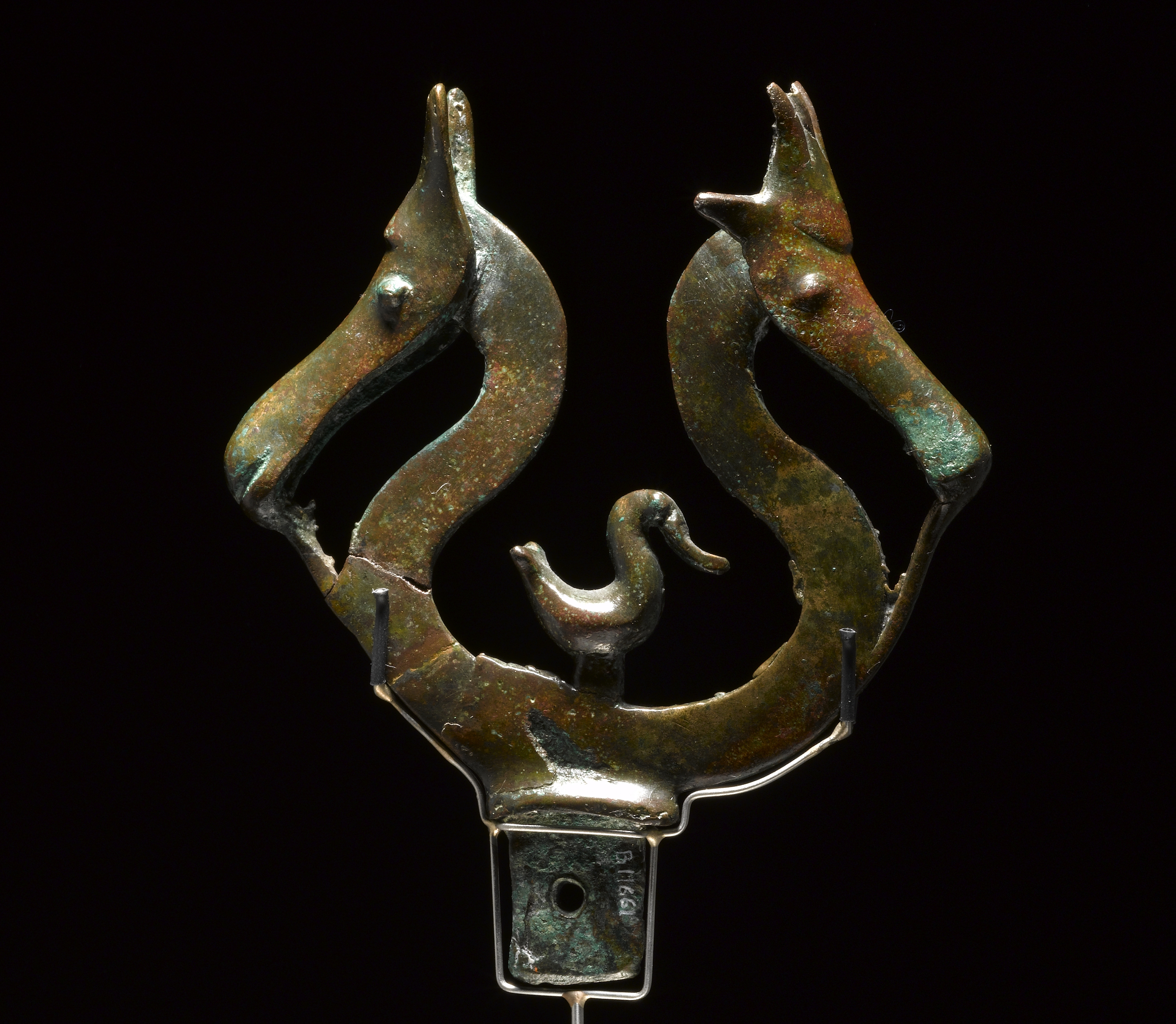
Bronze animal figurines, Denmark

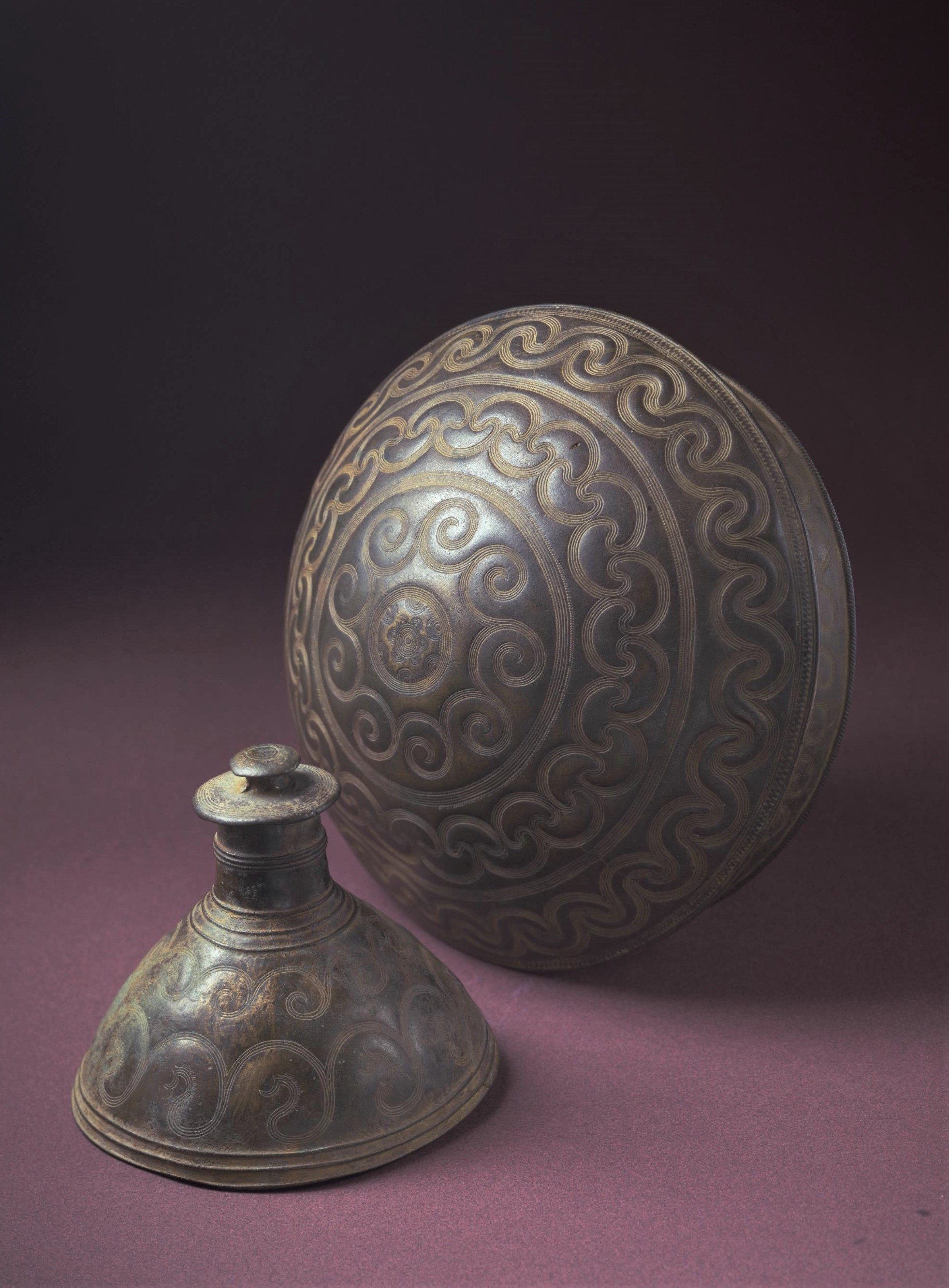
Bronze vessels, Sweden, c. 900 BC

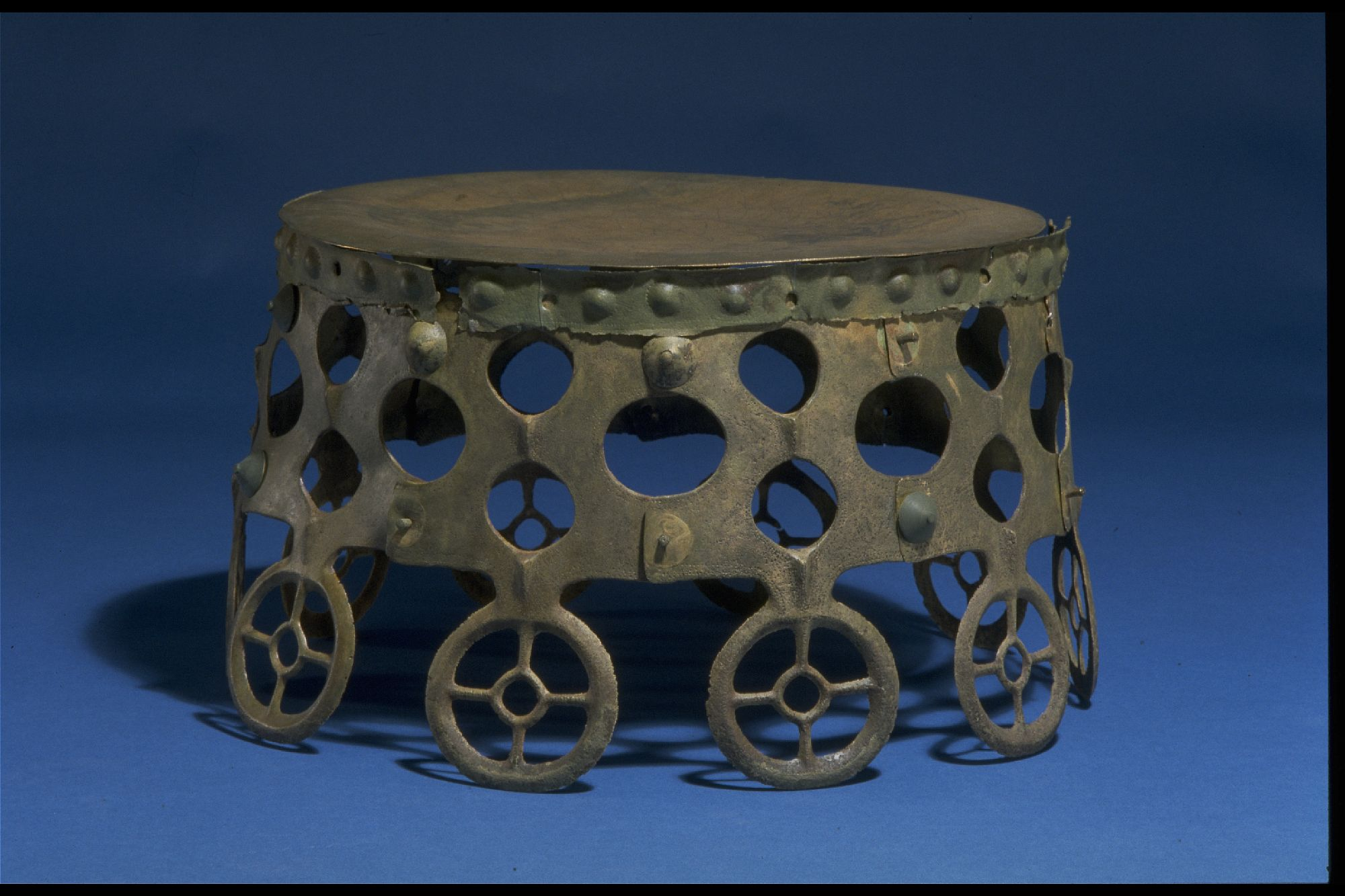
Balkåkra Ritual Object, Sweden, c. 1500-1300 BC

Horned ritual headdress from Hagendrup, Denmark, c. 1400 BC

Blue glass beads, imported from Egypt and Mesopotamia

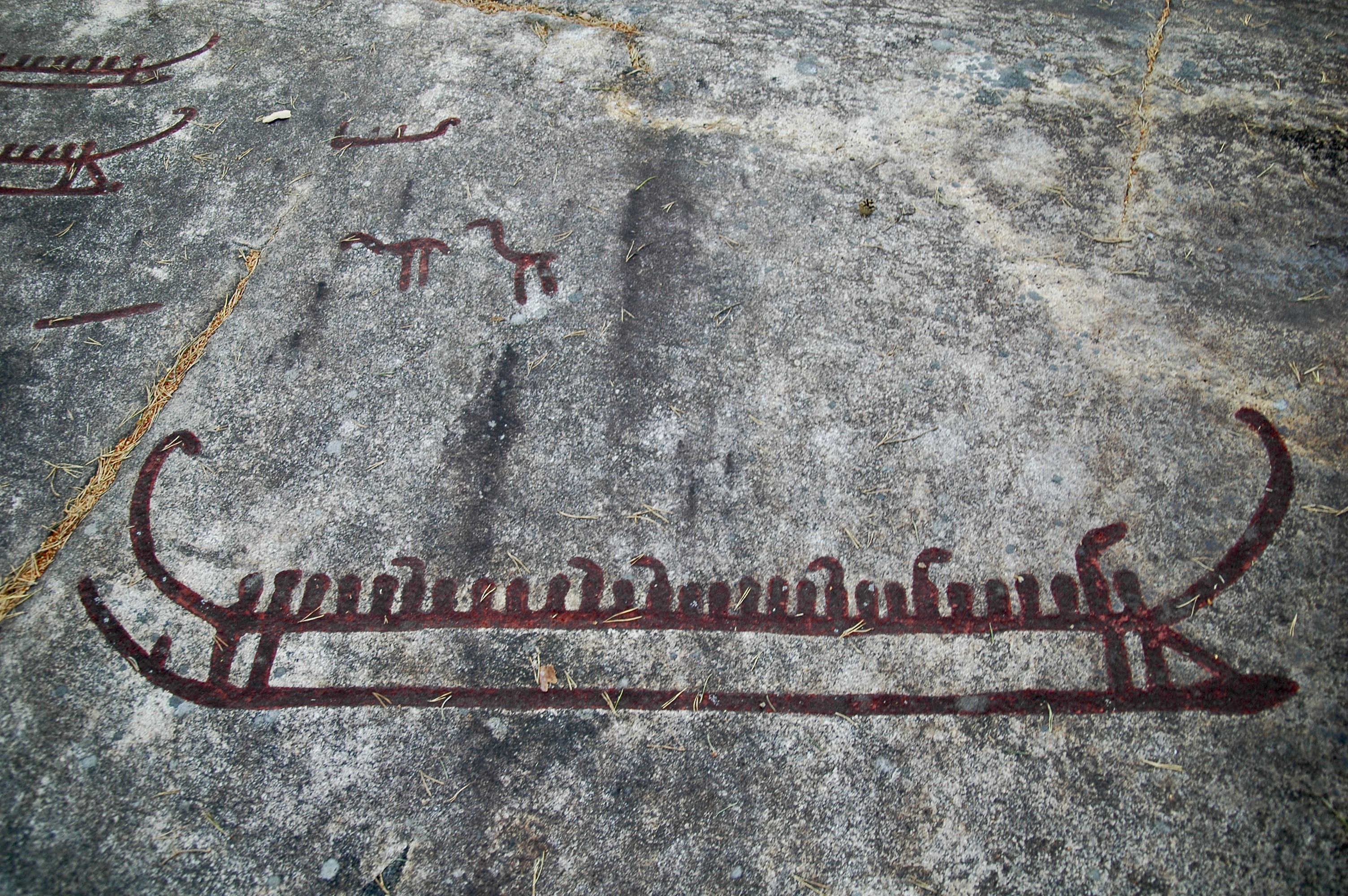
Boat petroglyph, Tanum, Sweden

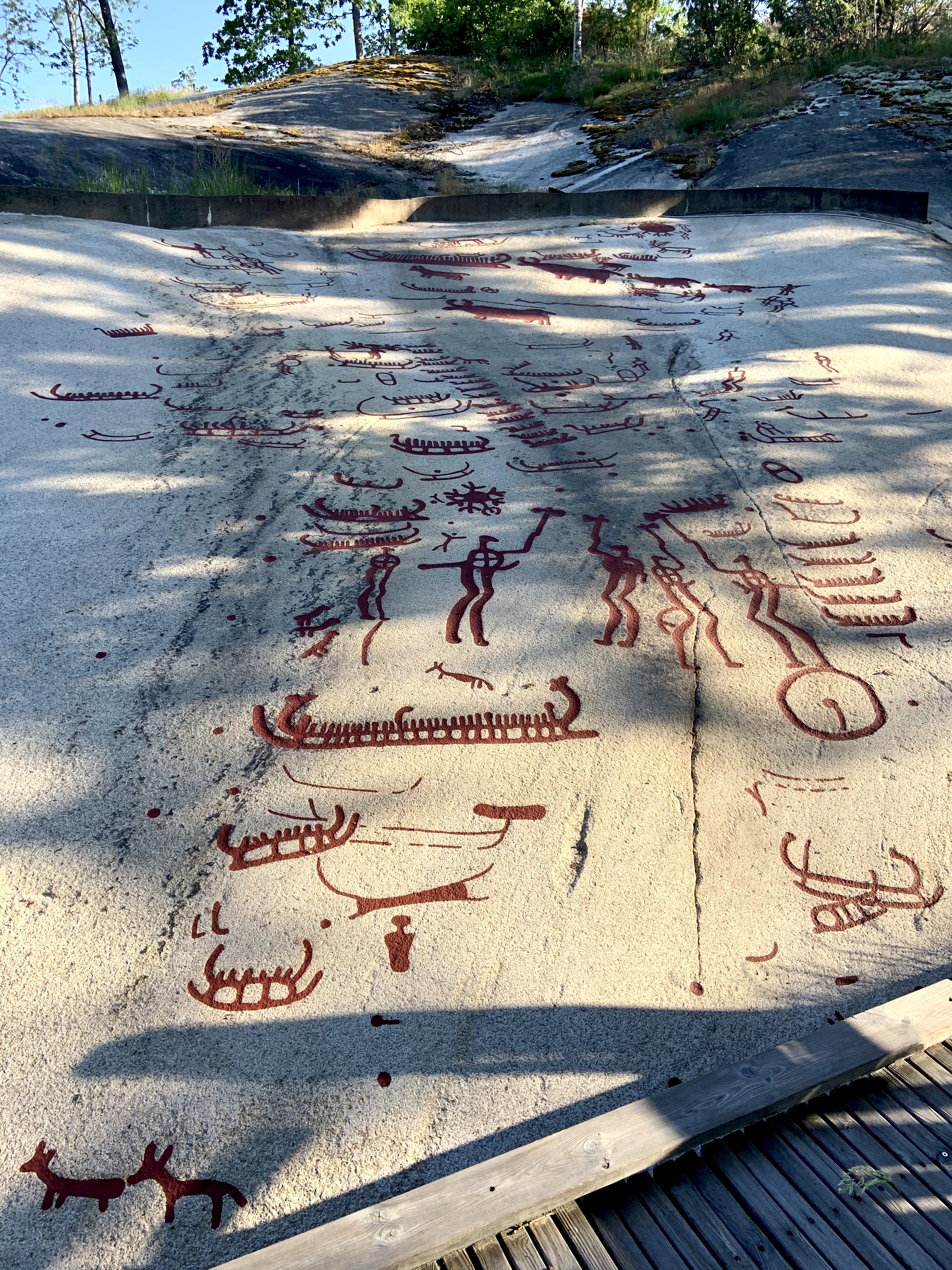
Petroglyphs in Tanumshede, western Sweden

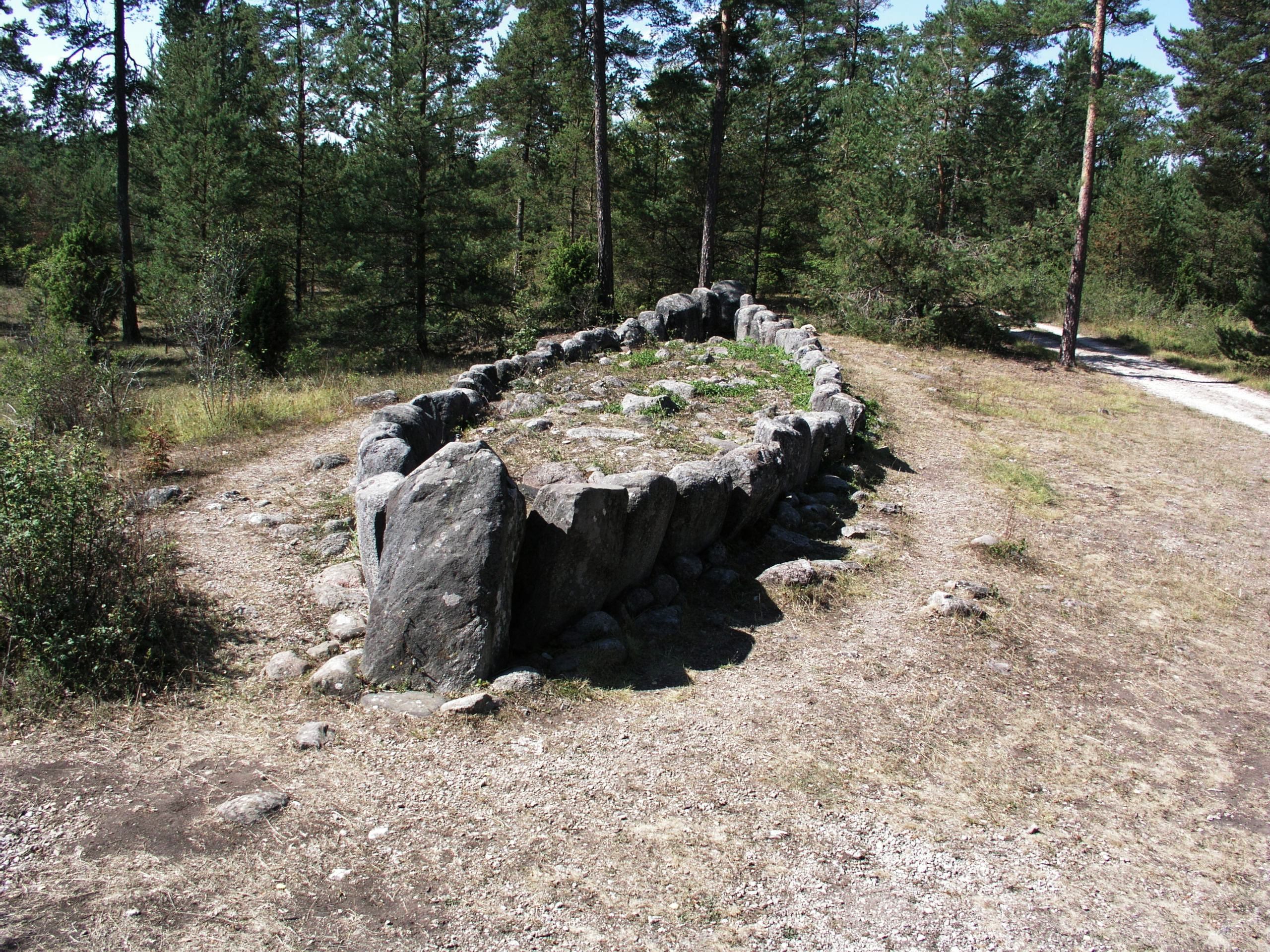
Stone ship monuments. Gotland in Sweden

=== Buildings and settlements ===
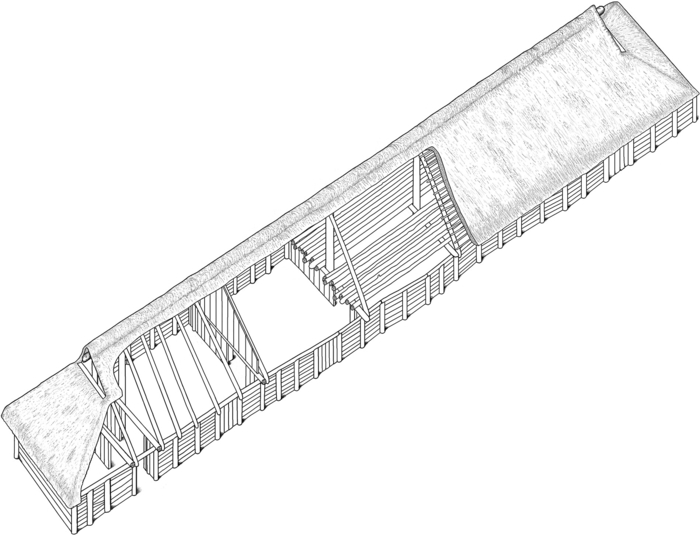
Longhouse reconstruction, Denmark, c. 1900 BC.

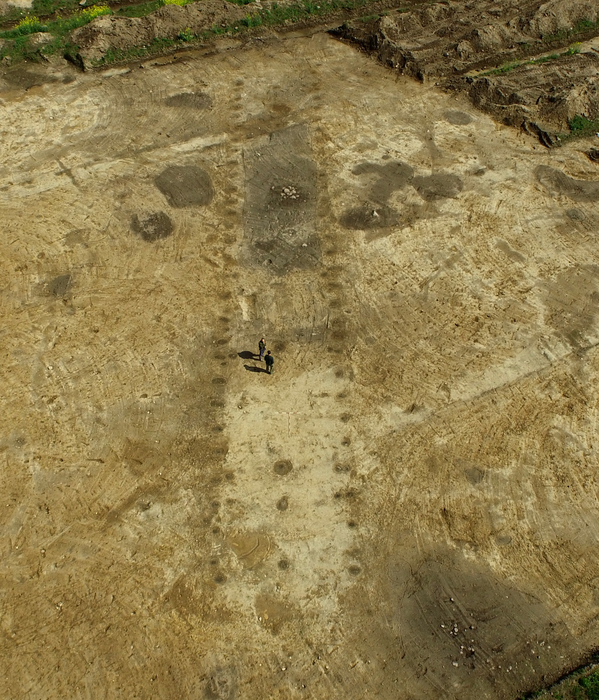
Longhouse remains, Denmark, c. 1900 BC.

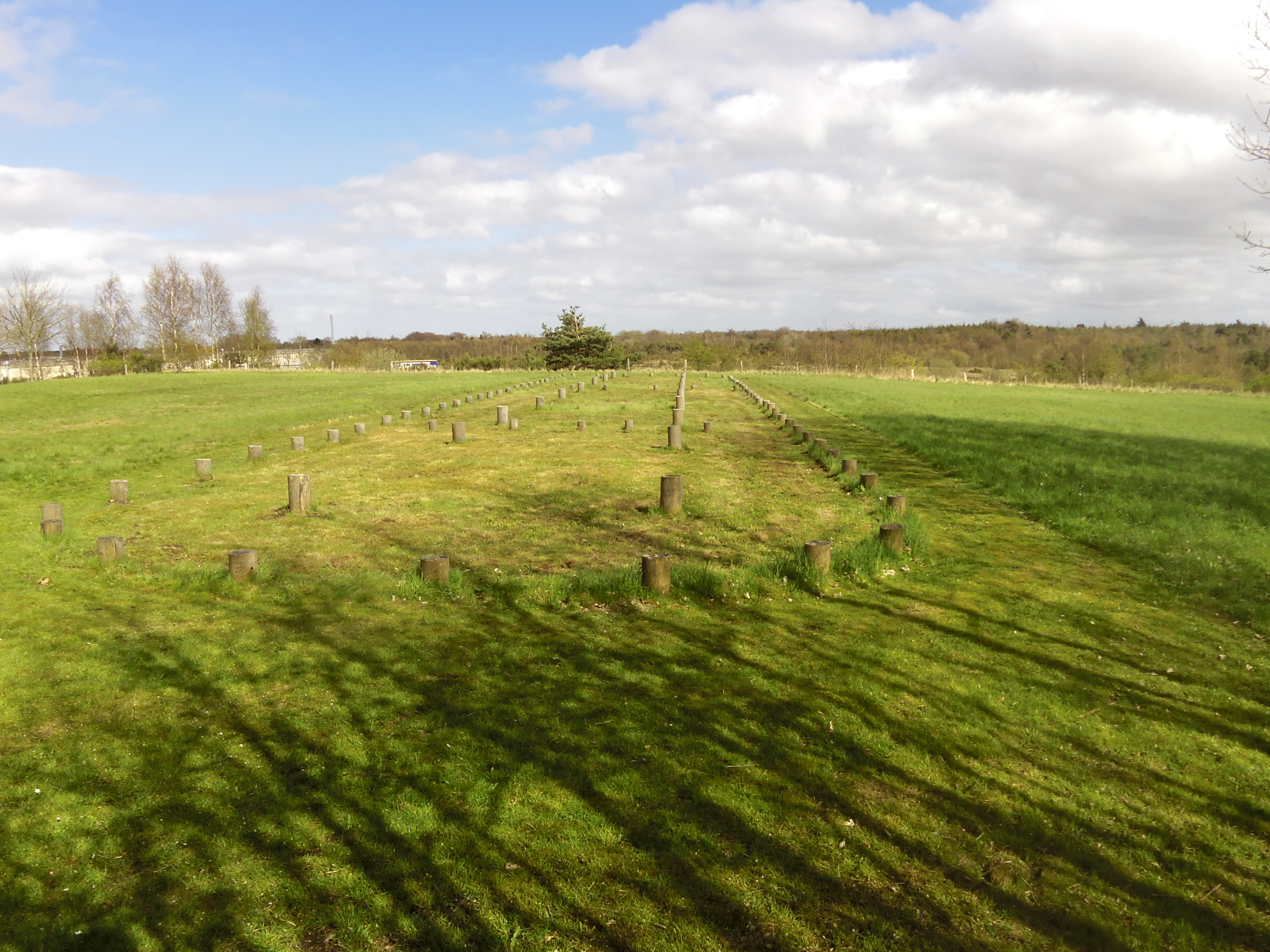
Outline of a 500 m^{2} chieftain's hall at Skrydstrup, Denmark, c. 1500 BC.

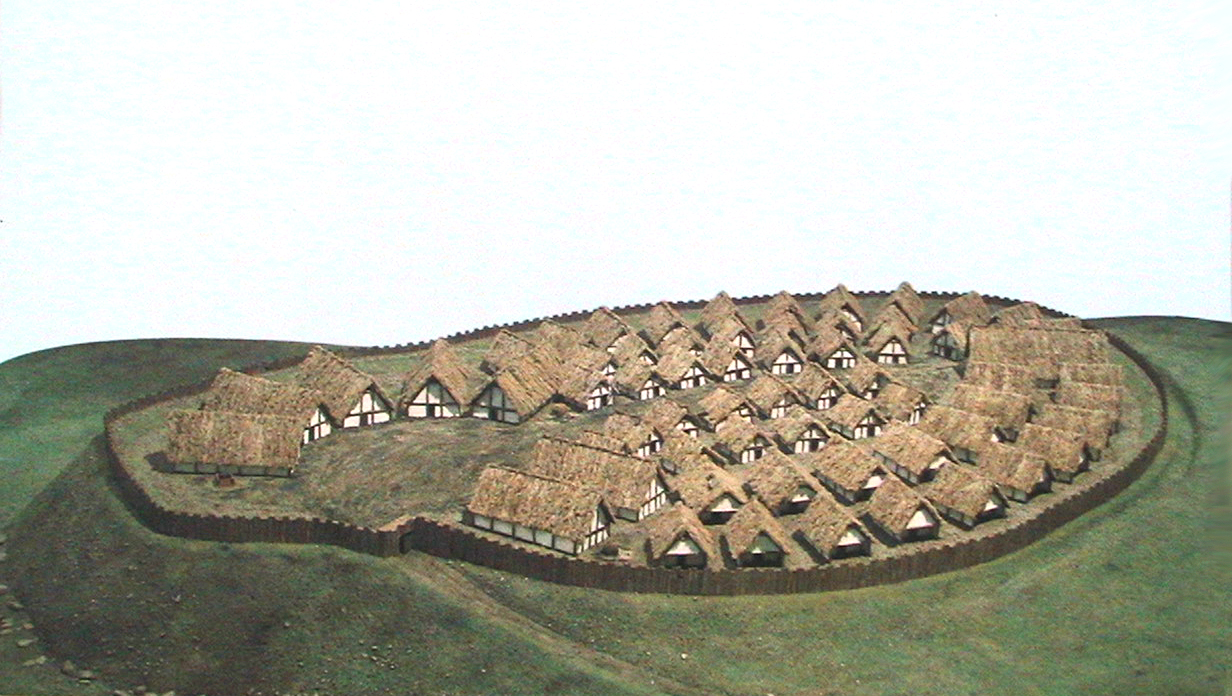
Hünenburg bei Watenstedt, Germany, central settlement reconstruction, c. 1000 BC.

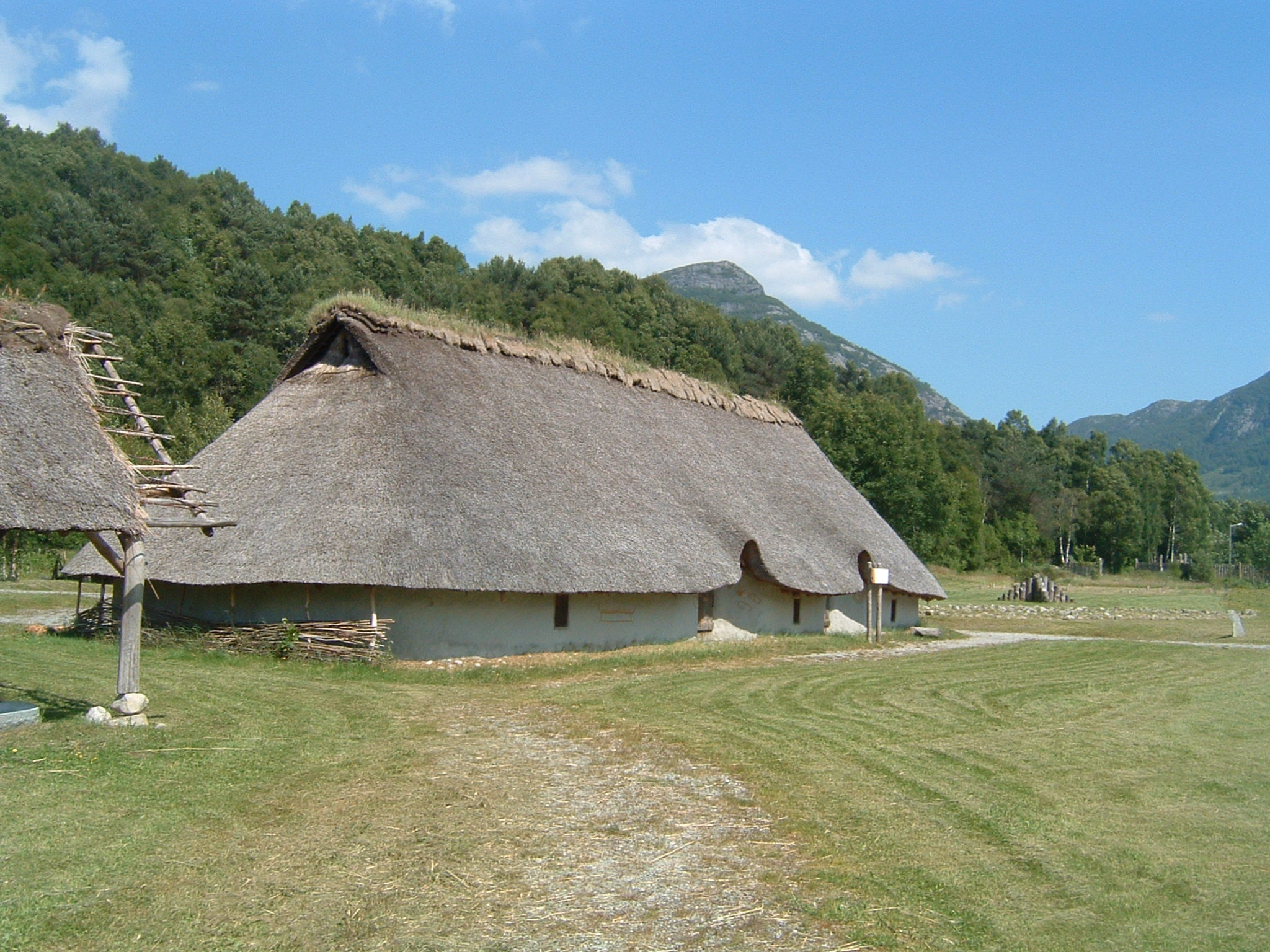
Bronze Age house at Landa, Norway, c. 1500 BC, reconstruction

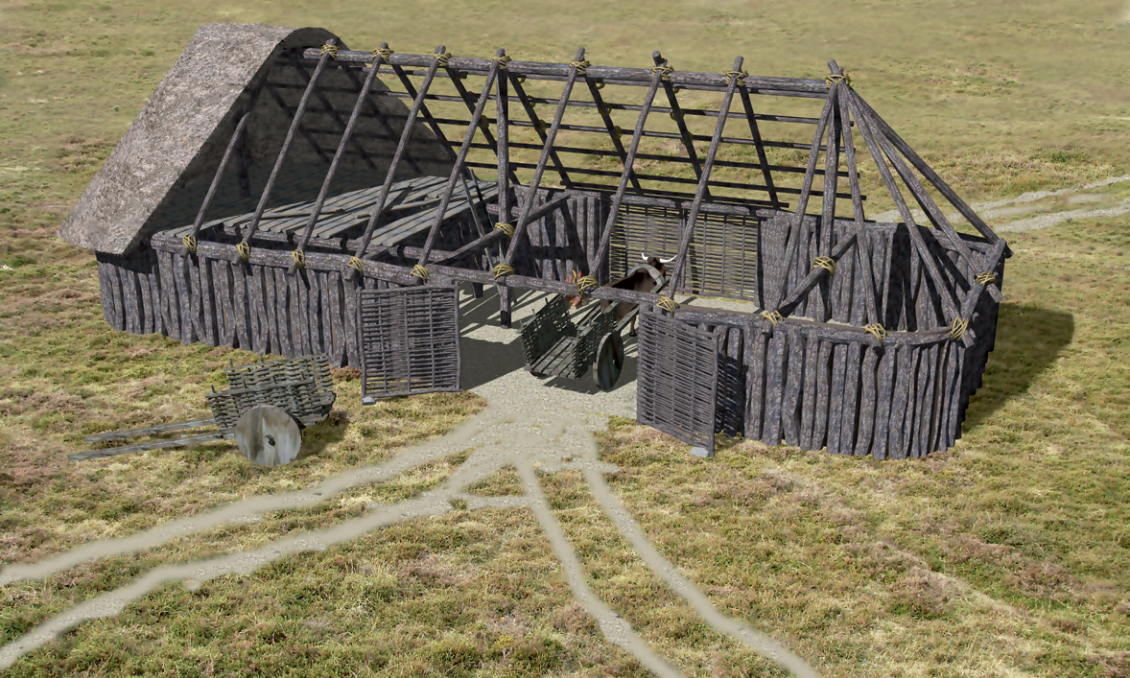
Reconstruction of a building at Østbirk, Denmark, c. 1800 BC

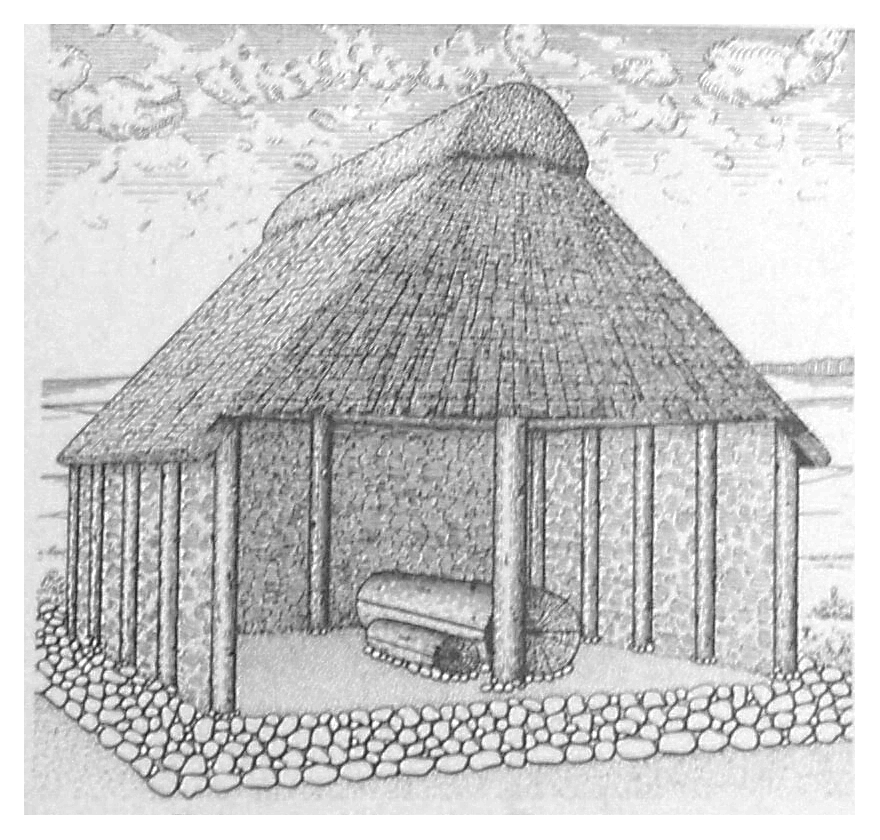
Illustration of a mortuary house with log-coffin burial at Tesperhude, northern Germany, c. 1200 BC

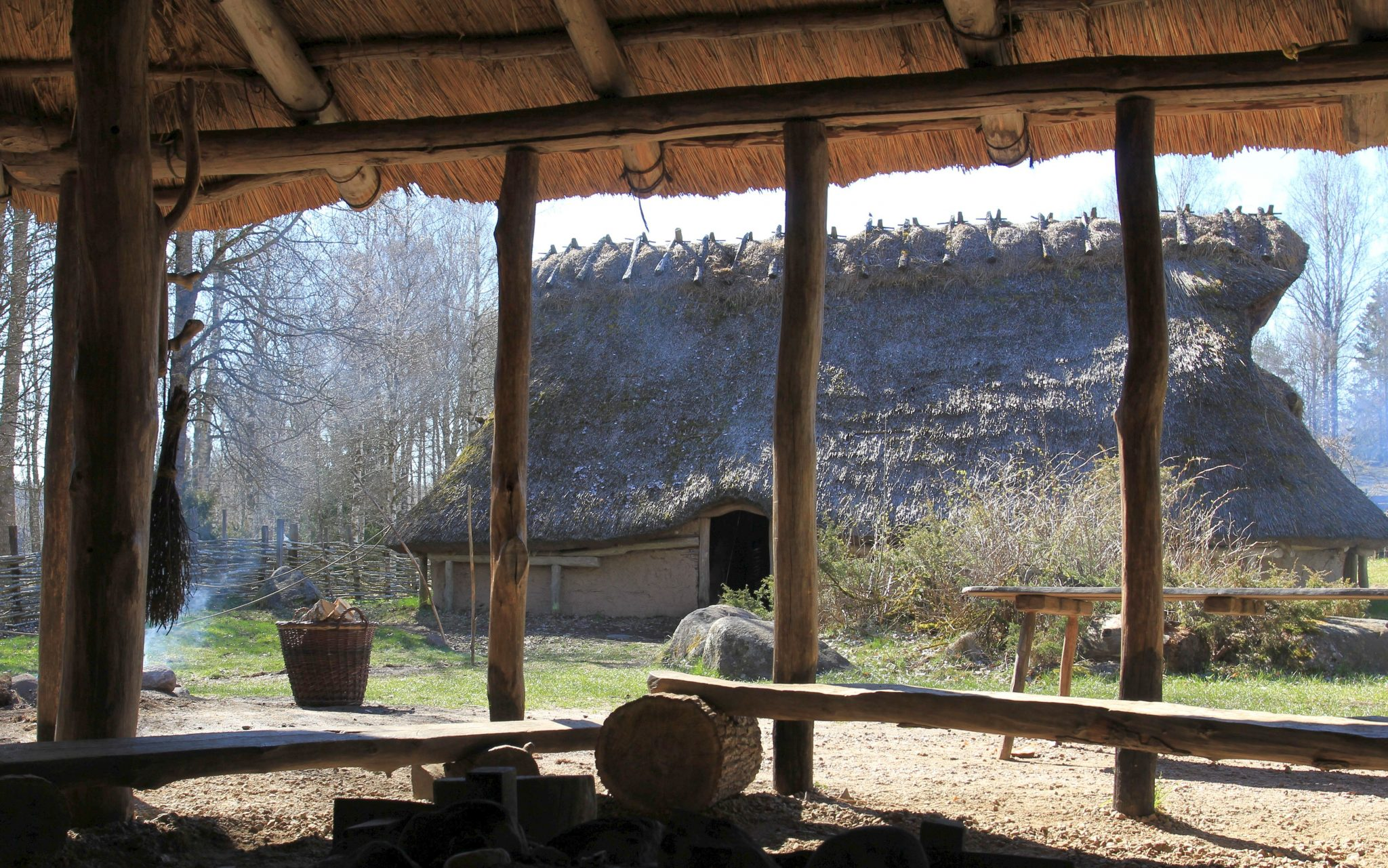
House reconstruction, Sweden

== See also ==
- Bronze Age Europe
- Bronze Age sword
- Egtved Girl
- The King's Grave
- Stone ships
- Rock Carvings in Tanum
- Pomeranian culture
- Single Grave culture

== Bibliography ==
- Allentoft, ME (11 June 2015). "Population genomics of Bronze Age Eurasia". Nature. 522 (7555). Nature Research: 167–172. Bibcode:2015Natur.522..167A. doi:10.1038/nature14507. PMID 26062507. S2CID 4399103. Archived from the original on 13 July 2019.
- Dabrowski, J. (1989) Nordische Kreis un Kulturen Polnischer Gebiete. Die Bronzezeit im Ostseegebiet. Ein Rapport der Kgl. Schwedischen Akademie der Literatur Geschichte und Alter unt Altertumsforschung über das Julita-Symposium 1986. Ed Ambrosiani, B. Kungl. Vitterhets Historie och Antikvitets Akademien. Konferenser 22. Stockholm.
- Davidson, H. R. Ellis and Gelling, Peter: The Chariot of the Sun and other Rites and Symbols of the Northern European Bronze Age.
- K. Demakopoulou (ed.), Gods and Heroes of the European Bronze Age, published on the occasion of the exhibition "Gods and Heroes of the Bronze Age. Europe at the Time of Ulysses", from 19 December 1998, to 5 April 1999, at the National Museum of Denmark, Copenhagen, London (1999), ISBN 0-500-01915-0.
- Demougeot, E. La formation de l'Europe et les invasions barbares, Paris: Editions Montaigne, 1969–1974.
- Douglas Price, Theron (2015). Ancient Scandinavia: An Archaeological History from the First Humans to the Vikings. Oxford University Press. ISBN 978-0-19-023197-2.
- Elliott, Rachel (2020). Håga in context: An analysis of the Håga complex in the Bronze Age landscape of the Mälar Valley region (PDF) (Thesis). Uppsala University. Archived (PDF) from the original on 29 December 2021.
- Frei, Karin Margarita (21 August 2019). "Mapping human mobility during the third and second millennia BC in present-day Denmark". PLOS One. 14 (8) e0219850. PLOS. Bibcode:2019PLoSO..1419850F. doi:10.1371/journal.pone.0219850. PMC 6703675. PMID 31433798.
- Goldhahn, Joakim (2013). "Rethinking Bronze Age Cosmology: A North European Perspective". The Oxford Handbook of the European Bronze Age. Oxford University Press. pp. 248–265. doi:10.1093/oxfordhb/9780199572861.013.0014. ISBN 978-0-19-957286-1. Archived from the original on 27 December 2021.
- Gubanov, I.B (June 2012). "Grave Circle B at Mycenae in the Context of Links Between the Eastern Mediterranean and Scandinavia in the Bronze Age". Archaeology, Ethnology and Anthropology of Eurasia. 40 (2). Elsevier B.V.: 99–103. doi:10.1016/j.aeae.2012.08.011.
- Henriksen, Mogens (2021). "Voldtofte – a Bronze-Age power centre from south-western Funen. Outlining 180 years of research – and still working!". Årbogen Odense Bys Museer. Odense City Museums. pp. 70–91. ISBN 978-87-902674-0-7. Archived from the original on 25 February 2023.
- Holst, Mads Kähler (2013). "Bronze Age 'Herostrats': Ritual, Political, and Domestic Economies in Early Bronze Age Denmark". Proceedings of the Prehistoric Society. 79: 265–296. doi:10.1017/ppr.2013.14. S2CID 129517784. Archived from the original on 29 December 2021.
- Iversen, Rune (2014). "Bronze Age acrobats: Denmark, Egypt, Crete". World Archaeology. 46 (2): 242–255. doi:10.1080/00438243.2014.886526. S2CID 162668376. Archived from the original on 19 December 2021.
- Kaliff, Anders. 2001. Gothic Connections. Contacts between eastern Scandinavia and the southern Baltic coast 1000 BC – 500 AD.
- Kristiansen, Kristian; Suchowska-Ducke, Paulina (December 2015). "Connected Histories: the Dynamics of Bronze Age Interaction and Trade 1500–1100 bc". Proceedings of the Prehistoric Society. 81. Cambridge University Press: 361–392. doi:10.1017/ppr.2015.17.
- Kristiansen, Kristian (2005). The Rise of Bronze Age Society. Cambridge University Press. p. 278. ISBN 978-0-521-84363-8. Archived from the original on 29 March 2023.
- Kristiansen, Kristian (2010). "Decentralized Complexity: The Case of Bronze Age Northern Europe". Pathways to Power. Fundamental Issues in Archaeology. Springer, New York, NY. pp. 169–192. doi:10.1007/978-1-4419-6300-0_7. ISBN 978-1-4419-6299-7. Archived from the original on 19 December 2021.
- Mathieson, Iain (23 November 2015). "Genome-wide patterns of selection in 230 ancient Eurasians". Nature. 528 (7583). Nature Research: 499–503. Bibcode:2015Natur.528..499M. doi:10.1038/nature16152. PMC 4918750. PMID 26595274.
- Mathieson, Iain (21 February 2018). "The Genomic History of Southeastern Europe". Nature. 555 (7695). Nature Research: 197–203. Bibcode:2018Natur.555..197M. doi:10.1038/nature25778. PMC 6091220. PMID 29466330.
- Melheim, Lene (2016). "Bronze casting and cultural connections:Bronze Age workshops at Hunn, Norway". Praehistorische Zeitschrift. 91 (1): 42–67. doi:10.1515/pz-2016-0003. S2CID 165147445. Archived from the original on 29 December 2021.
- Montelius, Oscar, 1885. Om tidsbestämning inom bronsåldern med särskilt avseende på Skandinavien.
- Musset, L. Les invasions: les vagues germanique, Paris: Presses universitaires de France, 1965.
- Nykamp, Moritz (2021). "Towards timing and stratigraphy of the Bronze Age burial mound royal tomb (Königsgrab) of Seddin (Brandenburg, northeastern Germany)". E&G Quaternary Science Journal. 70 (1): 1–17. Bibcode:2021EGQSJ..70....1N. doi:10.5194/egqsj-70-1-2021. S2CID 231839079. Archived from the original on 15 July 2022.
- Nørgaard, Heide W. (2018). Bronze Age Metalwork: Techniques and traditions in the Nordic Bronze Age 1500-1100 BC. Archaeopress. doi:10.2307/j.ctvndv72s. JSTOR j.ctvndv72s. S2CID 202513736.
- Schmidt, Karl Horst [in German] (1991). "The Celts and the Ethnogenesis of the Germanic People". Historische Sprachforschung. 104 (1). Vandenhoeck & Ruprecht: 129–152. JSTOR 40849016.
- Thomas, Homer L. (1992). "Archaeology And Indo-European Comparative Linguistics". In Polomé, Edgar C. (ed.). Reconstructing Languages and Cultures. Vol. 1. Walter de Gruyter. pp. 281–315. ISBN 978-3-11-012671-6. Archived from the original on 23 April 2023.
- Thrane, Henrik (2013). "Scandinavia". The Oxford Handbook of the European Bronze Age. Oxford University Press. pp. 746–764. doi:10.1093/oxfordhb/9780199572861.013.0041. ISBN 978-0-19-957286-1. Archived from the original on 29 December 2021.
- Varberg, Jeanette (2014). "Between Egypt, Mesopotamia and Scandinavia: Late Bronze Age glassbeads found in Denmark". Journal of Archaeological Science. 54: 168–181. doi:10.1016/j.jas.2014.11.036. Archived from the original on 18 December 2021.
- Zvelebil, Marek (1997). "Pitted Ware And Related Cultures Of Neolithic Northern Europe". In Bogucki, Peter I.; Crabtree, Pam J. (eds.). Ancient Europe 8000 B.C.--A.D. 1000: Encyclopedia of the Barbarian World. Ancient Europe 8000 B.C.- A.D. 1000: An Encyclopedia of the Barbarian World. Vol. 1. Scribner. pp. 431–435. ISBN 0-684-80669-X.
