= List of motifs on banknotes =

This is a list of current motifs on the banknotes of different countries and territories. The customary design of banknotes in most countries is a portrait of a notable citizen on the front (or obverse) and a different motif on the back (or reverse) - often something relating to that person. One exception to this is the euro banknotes, where non-existent architectural structures have been chosen to avoid the impression of a national bias. Even though most banknotes have more than one motif on each side, only the main motifs are described here.

== Afghanistan ==
The official currency of Afghanistan is the Afghan Afghani (AFN). The motifs used are:

Denomination	Obverse	Reverse
AFN 1	Seal of Da Afghanistan Bank	Shrine of Hazrat Ali
AFN 2	Seal of Da Afghanistan Bank	Taq-e Zafar
AFN 5	Seal of Da Afghanistan Bank	Bala Hissar fortress
AFN 10	Ahmad Shah Durrani mausoleum	Taq-e Zafar and Lion Gat
AFN 20	Mahmud of Ghazni's Tomb	Arg King's Palace
AFN 50	Shah-Do Shamshira Mosque	Salang Pass
AFN 100	Pul-e Khishti Mosque	Qala-e-Bost
AFN 500	Great Mosque of Herat	Kandahar International Airporttower
AFN 1,000	Shrine of Ali	Tomb of Ahmad Shah Durrani

== Albania ==
The official currency of Albania is the Albanian lek (ALL). The motifs used are:

Denomination	Obverse	Reverse
ALL 200	Naim Frashëri	Birthplace of Naim Frashëri
ALL 500	Ismail Kemal	Vlorë independence building
ALL 1,000	Pjetër Bogdani	Church of Vau
ALL 2,000	Gentius	Amphitheatre at Butrinto (near Saranda), yellow gentian (Gentiana lutea)
ALL 5,000	Skanderbeg	Krujë Castle
ALL 10,000	Asdreni	National flag

== Algeria ==
The official currency of Algeria is the Algerian dinar (DZD). The motifs used are:

Denomination	Obverse	Reverse
DZD 100	Charging Arab horse riders	Two men on horses, battleship
DZD 200	Decorative Koranic motifs and symbols, mosque, olive and fig branches	Traditional Koranic school and Kalam
DZD 500	Battle on elephants	Waterfall, ancient ruins, men on elephants
DZD 500	Globe, Alcomsat-1	Satellite dishes, outline of Algeria
DZD 1,000	A buffalo, paintings at Tassili n'Ajjer	Prehistoric Algerian landscape, painting from Tassili n’Ajjer
DZD 1,000	Arab League emblem, paintings from Tassili n’Ajjer	Prehistoric Algerian landscape, painting from Tassili n’Ajjer
DZD 1,000	Djamaa el Djazaïr	Loom, teapot
DZD 2,000	University professor lecturing students in amphitheatre, researchers in scientific laboratory	High rise building, olive tree
DZD 2,000	The historical leaders of the Front de libération nationale	Royal Mausoleum of Batna
DZD 2,000	Martyrs' Memorial	Tassili N'Ajjer National Park

== Angola ==
The official currency of Angola is the Angolan kwanza (AOA). The motifs used are:

Denomination	Obverse	Reverse
AOA 200	Agostinho Neto	Pedras Negras de Pungo
AOA 500	Agostinho Neto	Tundavala gap
AOA 1,000	Agostinho Neto	Planalto Central mountain range
AOA 2,000	Agostinho Neto	Leba mountain range
AOA 5,000	Agostinho Neto	Ruins of the Cathedral of São Salvador do Congo

== Argentina ==
The official currency of Argentina is the Argentine peso (ARS). The motifs used are:

Denomination	Obverse	Reverse
ARS 10	Manuel Belgrano	National Flag Memorial
ARS 20	Juan Manuel de Rosas	Battle of Vuelta de Obligado
ARS 20	Guanaco	Patagonian Desert
ARS 50	Domingo Faustino Sarmiento	Casa de Gobierno
ARS 50	Outline of the Falkland Islands	Gaucho Antonio Rivero riding a horse and holding a waving Argentine flag
ARS 50	Andean condor	Aconcagua
ARS 100	Julio Argentino Roca	Campaña del Desierto
ARS 100	María Eva Duarte de Perón	Ara Pacis
ARS 100	Taruca	Sierra de Famatina
ARS 200	Southern right whale	Valdes Peninsula
ARS 500	Jaguar	Yungas
ARS 1,000	Hornero	Pampas
ARS 1,000	José de San Martín	Crossing of the Andes
ARS 2,000	Ramón Carrillo and Cecilia Grierson	Carlos Malbrán National Institute of Microbiology
ARS 10,000	Manuel Belgrano and María Remedios del Valle	Soldiers pledging allegiance to the Argentine flag
ARS 20,000	Juan Bautista Alberdi	Juan Bautista Alberdi’s birthplace

== Armenia ==
The official currency of Armenia is the Armenian dram (AMD). The motifs used are:

1998-2017 series
Denomination	Obverse	Reverse
AMD 50	Aram Khachaturian	Scene from the ballet Gayane by Khachaturian
AMD 100	Viktor Hambardzumyan	Byurakan Observatory
AMD 500	Alexander Tamanian	Government House in Yerevan
AMD 1,000	Yeghishe Charents	An image of old Yerevan
AMD 5,000	Hovhannes Tumanyan	Nature scene from Lori
AMD 10,000	Avetik Isahakyan	An image of old Gyumri
AMD 20,000	Martiros Saryan	Detail from an Armenian landscape
AMD 50,000	Etchmiadzin Cathedral	St. Gregory the Illuminator and king Tiridates the Great holding a symbol representing the Armenian Church
AMD 100,000	Abgar V of Edessa	Abgar V of Edessa receiving the mandylion from St. Thaddeus (not pictured)

2018 (2017) - present
Denomination	Obverse	Reverse
AMD 500	Reliquary containing a fragment of Noah's Ark	Noah, his family members and animals
AMD 1,000	Paruyr Sevak	Paryur Sevak house (museum), Zangakatun; statue of Sevak
AMD 2,000	Tigran Petrosian	Tigran Petrosian Chess House, statue of Petrosyan
AMD 5,000	William Saroyan	Statue of Saroyan, early 20th century view of Baghesh
AMD 10,000	Komitas	Statue of Komitas, Gevorgian Seminary
AMD 20,000	Ivan Aivazovsky	Statue of Aivazovsky, Aivazovsky National Art Gallery
AMD 50,000	Saint Gregory the Illuminator	Statue of Saint Gregory the Illuminator, Khor Virap monastery

== Aruba ==
The official currency of Aruba is Aruban florin (AWG). The motifs used are:

Denomination	Obverse	Reverse
AWG 10	Green sea turtle	Bushiribana gold mill ruins
AWG 25	Venezuelan troupial	Arawak pottery and cave paintings
AWG 50	Red land crab	Willem III Tower, Fort Zoutman
AWG 100	Green iguana	Baile di Cinta dancers
AWG 200	Crested caracara	Caha di orgel

== Australia ==
The official currency of Australia is the Australian dollar (AUD). The motifs used are:

Denomination	Obverse	Reverse
AUD 5	Queen Elizabeth II	Parliament House
AUD 10	A. B. 'Banjo' Paterson	Dame Mary Gilmore
AUD 20	Mary Reibey	John Flynn
AUD 50	David Unaipon	Edith Cowan
AUD 100	Dame Nellie Melba	Sir John Monash

== Azerbaijan ==
The official currency of Azerbaijan is the Azerbaijani manat (AZN). The motifs used are:

Denomination	Obverse	Reverse
AZN 1	Daf, kamancheh, tar	Map of Azerbaijan
AZN 5	Books and a quill	Map of Azerbaijan
AZN 10	Palace of the Shirvanshahs and the Maiden Tower	Map of Azerbaijan
AZN 20	Sword, helmet, shield	Map of Azerbaijan
AZN 50	Youth, stairs	Map of Azerbaijan
AZN 100	Gosha Gala Gapi	Map of Azerbaijan
AZN 200	Heydar Aliyev Center	Map of Azerbaijan
AZN 500	Khodaafarin stone bridges	Mausoleum of Molla Panah Vagif

== Bahamas ==
The official currency of The Bahamas is the Bahamian dollar (BSD). The motifs used are:

Denomination	Obverse	Reverse
BSD 1/2	Queen Elizabeth II	Sister Sarah
BSD 1	Sir Lynden O. Pindling	Royal Bahamas Police Force Band
BSD 3	Queen Elizabeth II	Sailing boats
BSD 5	Cecil Wallace-Whitfield	Junkanoo dance
BSD 10	Queen Elizabeth II	Hope Town
BSD 10	Sir Stafford Lofthouse Sands	Hope Town
BSD 20	Sir Milo B. Butler	Nassau Harbour
BSD 50	Sir Roland T. Symonette	Central Bank of The Bahamas building
BSD 100	Queen Elizabeth II	Blue Marlin
BSD 100	Arthur Dion Hanna	Blue Marlin

== Bahrain ==
The official currency of Bahrain is the Bahraini dinar (BHD). The motifs used are:

Denomination	Obverse	Reverse
BHD 1/2	Old Bahrain Court	Bahrain International Circuit
BHD 1	Al Hedya Al Khalifiya School	Galloping Arabian Horses
BHD 5	Shaikh Isa House	First oil well in Bahrain
BHD 10	King Hamad ibn Isa Al Khalifah	Shaikh Isa Bin Salman Al Khalifa Causeway
BHD 20	King Hamad ibn Isa Al Khalifah	Al Fateh Islamic Center

== Brazil ==
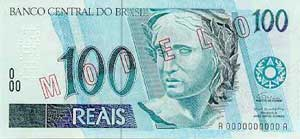
Obverse of a 100 Brazilian real banknote

The official currency of Brazil is the Brazilian real (BRL). The motifs used are:

Denomination	Obverse	Reverse
BRL 1 (no longer in circulation)	The Republic's Effigy	Sapphire-spangled emerald hummingbird
BRL 2	The Republic's Effigy	Hawksbill turtle
BRL 5	The Republic's Effigy	Great egret
BRL 10	The Republic's Effigy	Greenwing macaw
BRL 20	The Republic's Effigy	Golden lion tamarin
BRL 50	The Republic's Effigy	Jaguar
BRL 100	The Republic's Effigy	Dusky grouper
BRL 200	The Republic's Effigy	Maned wolf

== Canada ==
The official currency of Canada is the Canadian dollar (CAD). The motifs used on the Frontier Series, the most recent banknotes of the Canadian dollar released by the Bank of Canada, are:

Denomination	Obverse	Reverse
CAD 5	Wilfrid Laurier	Canadarm 2 (multifunction robotic arm) and Dextre (Special Purpose Dexterous Manipulator - SPDM), astronaut in space
CAD 10	John A. Macdonald	The Canadian (transcontinental passenger train from Montreal to Vancouver), mountains
CAD 20	Queen Elizabeth II	Canadian National Vimy Memorial
CAD 50	William Lyon Mackenzie King	CCGS Amundsen
CAD 100	Robert Borden	Medical research, electrocardiogram track pattern, strand of DNA, woman at a microscope, bottle of insulin

== China, People's Republic of ==
The official currency of China is the Chinese yuan (CNY). The motifs used are:

Denomination	Obverse	Reverse
CNY 1	Mao Zedong	Three Pools Mirroring the Moon at West Lake
CNY 5	Mao Zedong	Mount Tai
CNY 10	Mao Zedong	Three Gorges of the Yangtze River
CNY 20	Mao Zedong	Scenery of Guilin
CNY 50	Mao Zedong	Potala Palace
CNY 100	Mao Zedong	Great Hall of the People

== Colombia ==
The official currency of Colombia is the Colombian peso (COP). The motifs used are:

Denomination	Obverse	Reverse
COP 1000	Jorge Eliécer Gaitán (face)	Jorge Eliécer Gaitán (body until the chest) and a crowd
COP 2000	Francisco de Paula Santander	The door of the Casa de la moneda
COP 5000	José Asunción Silva	Hacienda El Paraiso, from the novel Maria
COP 10,000	Policarpa Salavarrieta	Guaduas main plaza
COP 20,000	Julio Garavito Armero	The Moon, a reference to the Garavito Crater
COP 50,000	Jorge Isaacs	A paragraph from the novel María

== Croatia ==
The official currency of Croatia is the Croatian kuna (HRK). The motifs used are:

Denomination	Obverse	Reverse
HRK 5	Fran Krsto Frankopan and ban Petar Zrinski	Castle in Varaždin (mirrored)
HRK 10	Juraj Dobrila	Arena in Pula
HRK 20	Ban Josip Jelačić	Castle of the Eltz family in Vukovar and Vučedol Dove
HRK 50	Ivan Gundulić	Dubrovnik
HRK 100	Viceroy (ban) Ivan Mažuranić	Church of Saint Vitus in Rijeka
HRK 200	Stjepan Radić	Building of the High military command in the Austrian fortress Tvrđa in Osijek
HRK 500	Marko Marulić	Diocletian's Palace in Split
HRK 1000	Ante Starčević	Statue of the medieval king Tomislav and Zagreb cathedral in Zagreb

== Czech Republic ==
The official currency of Czech Republic is the Czech koruna (CZK). The motifs used are:

Denomination	Obverse	Reverse
CZK 20	Ottokar I. of Bohemia	Crown and Seal of Ottokar I. of Bohemia (withdrawn to 31.8.2008)
CZK 50	Saint Agnes of Bohemia	St. Salvator's Church ceiling (part of Convent of St. Agnes of Bohemia in Prague) and ornamental letter A (withdrawn to 31.3.2011)
CZK 100	Charles IV	Seal of Charles University in Prague
CZK 200	John Amos Comenius	Orbis Pictus, an adult's hand passing to a child's hand
CZK 500	Božena Němcová	Laureate woman symbolizing all woman characters in Němcová's books
CZK 1000	František Palacký	Eagle spread its wings over the Archbishop's Castle in Kroměříž, where a constitution preparing parliament of Austrian Empire was held in 1848
CZK 2000	Emmy Destinn	Euterpe and musical motifs like violin
CZK 5000	Tomáš Garrigue Masaryk	Gothic and Baroque buildings in Prague, in centre dominating St. Vitus Cathedral

== Denmark ==
The official currency of Denmark is the Danish krone (DKK). The motifs used are:

Denomination	Obverse	Reverse
DKK 50	Sallingsund Bridge	Skarpsalling vessel
DKK 100	Little Belt Bridge	Hindsgavl dagger
DKK 200	Knippelsbro	Langstrup belt plate
DKK 500	Queen Alexandrine Bridge	Keldby bronze pail
DKK 1000	Great Belt Bridge	Trundholm Sun Chariot

== Egypt ==
The official currency of Egypt is the Egyptian pound (EGP). The motifs used are:

Denomination	Obverse	Reverse
LE 1	the Mosque of Sultan Qaitbay	a part of the facade of Abu Simbel Temple
LE 5	Mosque of Ibn Tulun جامع أحمد بن طولون, in Cairo	the River Nile bestowing its blessing on the Valley
LE 10	Al Rifa'i Mosque جامع الرفاعى, in Cairo	A statue of Khafre الملك خفرع
LE 20	Mosque of Muhammad Ali جامع محمد على at the Citadel, Cairo	relief pharaonic drawings on one of the pillars of Sesostris I Temple
LE 50	Abu Hariba Mosque	an inside view of Edfu Temple
LE 100	Mosque-Madrassa of Sultan Hassan جامع السلطان حسن, in Cairo	head of the Sphinx statue
LE 200	Mosque of Qanybay El-Rammah	The Seated Scribe

== Estonia ==
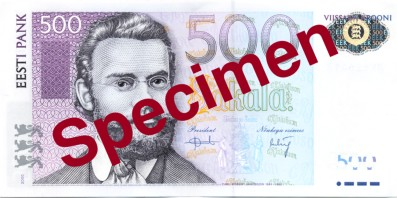
Carl Robert Jakobson on the obverse side of the 500 EEK banknote.

The former currency of Estonia was the Estonian kroon (EEK). The motifs used are:

Denomination	Obverse	Reverse
EEK 1	Kristjan Raud	Toompea Castle in Tallinn
EEK 2	Karl Ernst von Baer	University of Tartu
EEK 5	Paul Keres	The Narva river and the Jaanilinn stronghold
EEK 10	Jakob Hurt	The Tamme-Lauri oak at Urvaste
EEK 25	A. H. Tammsaare	A view of Vargamäe
EEK 50	Rudolf Tobias	The Estonia Opera House in Tallinn
EEK 100	Lydia Koidula	Baltic Klint
EEK 500	Carl Robert Jakobson	A barn swallow flying over a landscape

== Euro area (EU) ==
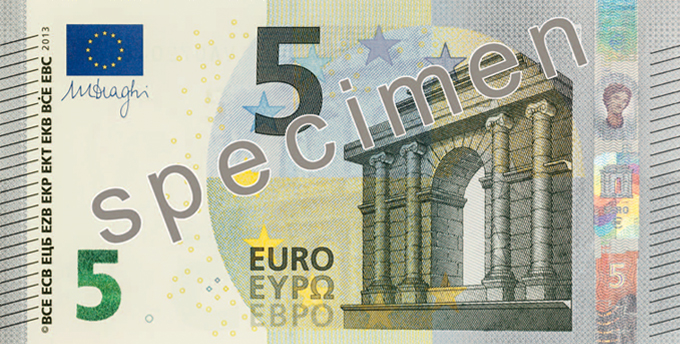

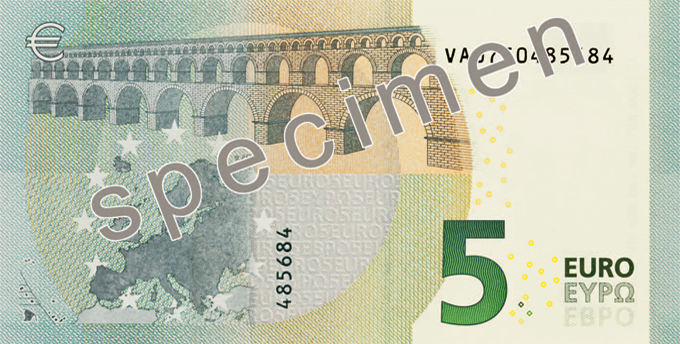
The 5 euro note of the Europa series.

The official currency of the 21 Eurozone countries (and a number of other territories) is the euro (EUR). The motifs used are:

Denomination	Obverse	Reverse
EUR 5	Classical gateway	Classical bridge
EUR 10	Romanesque gateway	Romanesque bridge
EUR 20	Gothic windows	Gothic bridge
EUR 50	Renaissance windows	Renaissance bridge
EUR 100	Baroque/Rococo gateway	Baroque/Rococo bridge
EUR 200	Art Nouveau windows	Art Nouveau bridge
EUR 500	Modern windows	Modern bridge

== Hungary ==
The official currency of Hungary is the Hungarian forint (HUF). The motifs used are:

Denomination	Obverse	Reverse
HUF 200	Charles I	Diósgyőr Castle
HUF 500	Francis II Rákóczi	Sárospatak Castle
HUF 1000	King Matthias Corvinus	Hercules Fountain in Visegrád
HUF 2000	Gábor Bethlen	Bethlen and his scientists
HUF 5000	Count István Széchenyi	Széchenyi Mansion in Nagycenk
HUF 10,000	King Stephen I of Hungary	Esztergom
HUF 20,000	Ferenc Deák	The old House of Commons in Pest (today: Italian Cultural Institute)

== Iceland ==
The official currency of Iceland is the Icelandic króna (ISK). The motifs used are:

Denomination	Obverse	Reverse
ISK 500	Jón Sigurðsson	Reykjavík grammar school
ISK 1000	Brynjólfur Sveinsson	Brynjólfskirkja
ISK 2000	Jóhannes S. Kjarval	Painting and drawing by Karval
ISK 5000	Ragnheiður Jónsdóttir	Laufáskirkja altar cloth
ISK 10,000	Jónas Hallgrímsson	Eurasian golden plover

== India ==
The official currency of India is the Indian rupee (INR). Currently the Reserve Bank of India issues the Mahatma Gandhi series and the Mahatma Gandhi New Series banknotes. The motifs used in it are:

Denomination	Obverse	Reverse
INR 5	Mahatma Gandhi	Tractor
INR 10	Mahatma Gandhi	Sun Temple, Konark
INR 20	Mahatma Gandhi	Ellora Caves
INR 50	Mahatma Gandhi	Hampi
INR 100	Mahatma Gandhi	Rani ki vav
INR 200	Mahatma Gandhi	Sanchi Stupa
INR 500	Mahatma Gandhi	Red Fort
INR 2000	Mahatma Gandhi	Mangalyaan

== Indonesia ==
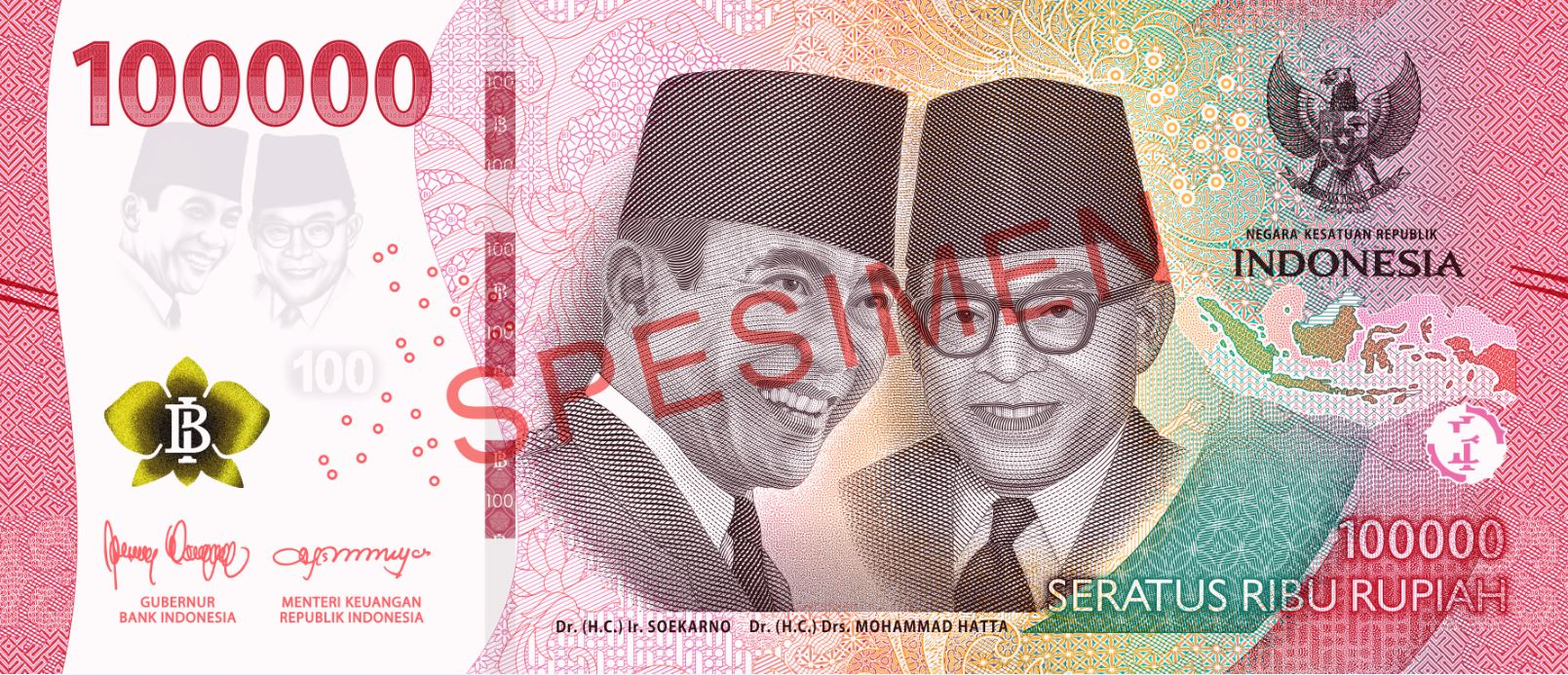
Obverse of a IDR 100,000 banknote

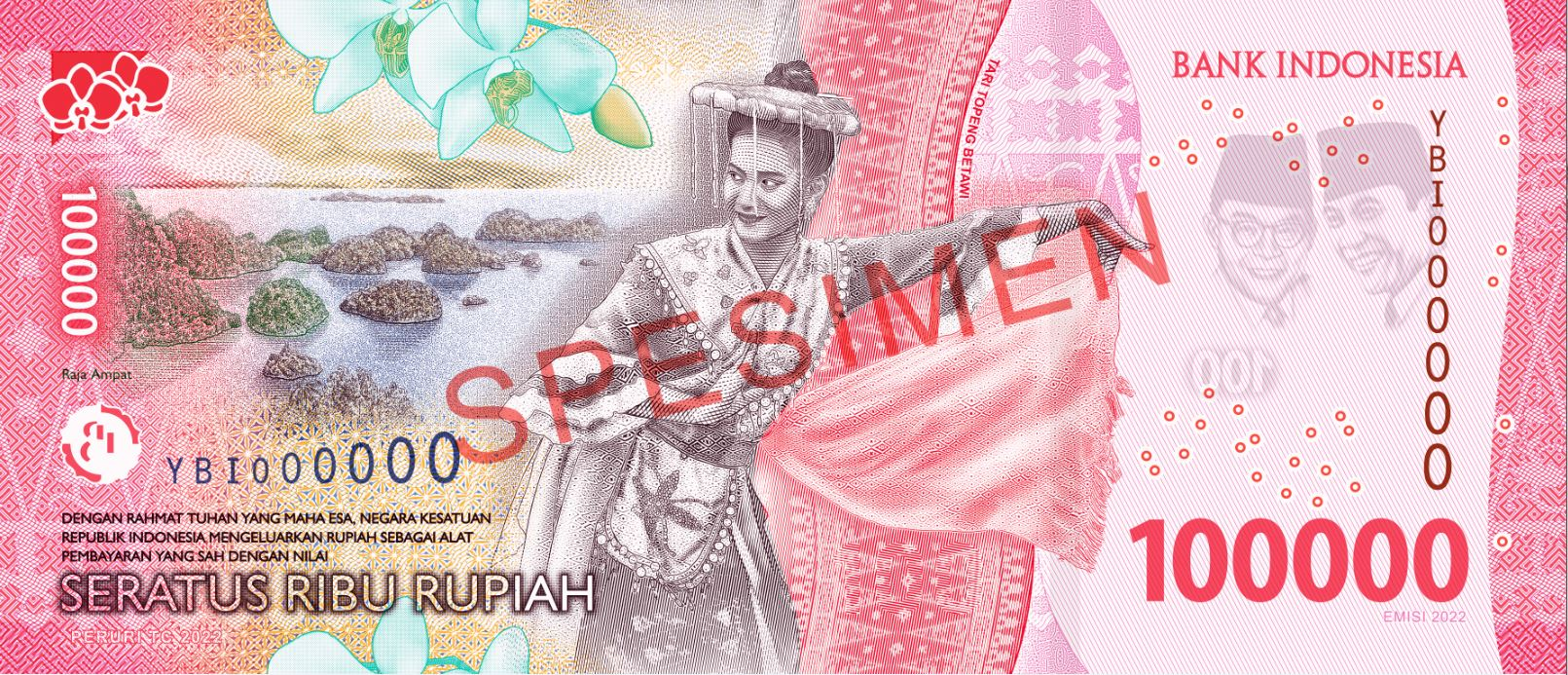
Reverse of a IDR 100,000 banknote

The official currency of Indonesia is the Indonesian Rupiah (IDR). The motifs used are:

Denomination	Obverse	Reverse
IDR 1000	Tjut Meutia	Tifa dance and Banda Neira
IDR 2000	Mohammad Husni Thamrin	Piring dance and Sianok Canyon
IDR 5000	Idham Chalid	Gambyong dance and Mount Bromo
IDR 10,000	Frans Kaisiepo	Pakarena dance and Wakatobi National Park
IDR 20,000	Gerungan Saul Samuel Jacob Ratulangi	Gong dance and Derawan Islands
IDR 50,000	Djuanda Kartawidjaja	Legong dance and Komodo National Park
IDR 100,000	Sukarno and Mohammad Hatta	Topeng Betawi dance and Raja Ampat Islands

== Iran ==
The official currency of Iran is the Iranian rial (IRR). The motifs used are:

Denomination	Obverse	Reverse
IRR 100	Ayatollah Modarres	Old building of Islamic Consultative Assembly
IRR 200	Jame' Mosque of Yazd	Jahad-e Sazandegi (جهاد سازندگی)
IRR 500	Friday prayers	University of Tehran main entrance
IRR 1000	Ruhollah Khomeini	Dome of the Rock
IRR 2000	Ruhollah Khomeini	Kaaba
IRR 5000	Ruhollah Khomeini	traditional decorative birds and flowers pattern
IRR 5000	Ruhollah Khomeni	OMID satellite, Safir 2 rocket, globe with the marked territory of Iran
IRR 5000	Ruhollah Khomeni	Pottery of Zabol (Eastern Iran)
IRR 10,000	Ruhollah Khomeini	Mount Damavand
IRR 20,000	Ruhollah Khomeini	Naqsh-e Jahan Square
IRR 50,000	Ruhollah Khomeini	Map of Iran with Atom symbol, quote in Persian from the prophet Mohammed, and "Persian Gulf" in English
IRR 100,000	Ruhollah Khomeini	Saadi's Mausoleum in Shiraz

== Iraq ==
The official currency of Iraq is the Iraqi Dinar (IQD). The motifs used are:

2003 Series:

Denomination	Obverse	Reverse
IQD 50	Grain silos at Basra	Date palms
IQD 250	An Arabic astrolabe أسطرلاب	Spiral minaret of the Great Mosque of Samarra
IQD 1000	An Islamic gold dinar coin, دينار إسلامي ذهبي	Mustansiriya School, Baghdad
IQD 5000	Geli Ali Beg waterfall, شلال كلي علي بك	Al-Ukhaidir Fortress, Karbala
IQD 10,000	Ibn al-Haytham	The hunchbacked minaret Great Mosque of al-Nuri in Mosul
IQD 25,000	A Kurdish farmer holding a sheaf of wheat, a tractor and An Islamic gold dinar coin	Carving of the Code of King Hammurabi

2004 Series:

Denomination	Obverse	Reverse
IQD 500	Dukan Dam	winged bull, Lamassu
IQD 10,000	Ibn al-Haytham	The hunchbacked minaret Great Mosque of al-Nuri in Mosul
IQD 25,000	A Kurdish farmer holding a sheaf of wheat, a tractor and An Islamic gold dinar coin	Carving of the Code of King Hammurabi

2006 Series:

Denomination	Obverse	Reverse
IQD 5000	Geli Ali Beg waterfall, شلال كلي علي بك	Al-Ukhaidir Fortress, Karbala
IQD 10000	Ibn al-Haytham	The hunchbacked minaret Great Mosque of al-Nuri in Mosul
IQD 25,000	A Kurdish farmer holding a sheaf of wheat, a tractor and An Islamic gold dinar coin	Carving of the Code of King Hammurabi

2008 Series:

Denomination	Obverse	Reverse
IQD 25,000	A Kurdish farmer holding a sheaf of wheat, a tractor and An Islamic gold dinar coin	Carving of the Code of King Hammurabi

2010 Series:

Denomination	Obverse	Reverse
IQD 5000	Geli Ali Beg waterfall, شلال كلي علي بك	Al-Ukhaidir Fortress, Karbala
IQD 10,000	Ibn al-Haytham	The hunchbacked minaret Great Mosque of al-Nuri in Mosul
IQD 25,000	A Kurdish farmer holding a sheaf of wheat, a tractor and An Islamic gold dinar coin	Carving of the Code of King Hammurabi

2012 Series:

Denomination	Obverse	Reverse
IQD 250	An Arabic astrolabe أسطرلاب	Spiral minaret of the Great Mosque of Samarra
IQD 1000	An Islamic gold dinar coin, دينار إسلامي ذهبي	Mustansiriya School, Baghdad

2013 Series (1434 hijry) Islamic calendar :

Denomination	Obverse	Reverse
IQD 1000	An Islamic gold dinar coin, دينار إسلامي ذهبي	Mustansiriya School, Baghdad
IQD 5000	Geli Ali Beg waterfall, شلال كلي علي بك	Al-Ukhaidir Fortress, Karbala
IQD 10,000	Ibn al-Haytham	The hunchbacked minaret Great Mosque of al-Nuri in Mosul

2013 Series (1435 hijry) Islamic calendar :

Denomination	Obverse	Reverse
IQD 250	An Arabic astrolabe أسطرلاب, one intaglio circle at left front	Spiral minaret of the Great Mosque of Samarra
IQD 500	Dukan Dam, Two intaglio circles at left front	winged bull, Lamassu
IQD 1000	An Islamic gold dinar coin, دينار إسلامي ذهبي, Three intaglio circles at left front	Mustansiriya School, Baghdad
IQD 5000	Geli Ali Beg waterfall, شلال كلي علي بك, one intaglio bar at left front	Al-Ukhaidir Fortress, Karbala
IQD 10,000	Freedom Monument in Baghdad, Jawad Saleem, two intaglio bar at left front	The hunchbacked minaret Great Mosque of al-Nuri in Mosul
IQD 25,000	A Kurdish peasant holding a jug, a tractor and An Islamic gold dinar coin, three intaglio bar at left front	Carving of the Code of King Hammurabi

2015 Series :

Denomination	Obverse	Reverse
IQD 500	Dukan Dam, two intaglio circles at left front	winged bull, Lamassu, Add Kurdish language
IQD 10,000	Freedom Monument in Baghdad, Jawad Saleem, two intaglio bar at left front	The hunchbacked minaret Great Mosque of al-Nuri in Mosul
IQD 25,000	A Kurdish peasant holding a jug, a tractor and An Islamic gold dinar coin, three intaglio bar at left front	Carving of the Code of King Hammurabi
IQD 50,000	Water wheel on the Euphrates river Noria, Date palm, Gali Ali Beg waterfall in Arbil, four intaglio bar at left front	Mesopotamian Marshes, reed house, Euphrates and Tigris rivers

Table of Iraqi Banknotes according to the years of issue:

Denomination	2003	2004	2006	2008	2010	2012	2013/1434	2013/1435	2015
IQD 50	Yes								
IQD 250	Yes					Yes		Yes	
IQD 500		Yes						Yes	Yes
IQD 1000	Yes					Yes	Yes	Yes	
IQD 5000	Yes		Yes		Yes		Yes	Yes	
IQD 10,000	Yes	Yes	Yes		Yes		Yes	Yes	Yes
IQD 25,000	Yes	Yes	Yes	Yes	Yes			Yes	Yes
IQD 50,000									Yes

== Japan ==
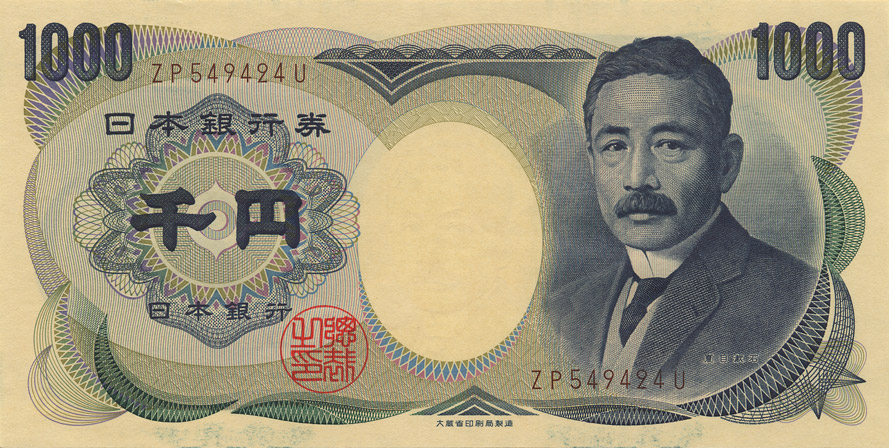
Obverse of a 1984 series 1000 Japanese yen banknote

The official currency of Japan is the Japanese yen (JPY). The motifs used are:

1984 Series (Series D):

Denomination	Obverse	Reverse
JPY 1000	Natsume Sōseki	Pair of Cranes
JPY 5000	Nitobe Inazo	Mount Fuji, Lake Motosuko and Cherry blossoms
JPY 10,000	Fukuzawa Yukichi	Pair of Pheasants

2000 Special (Series D):

Denomination	Obverse	Reverse
JPY 2000	Shureimon (the Gate of Shurei)	scene from Genji Monogatari (the Tale of Genji). On lower right is a portrait of the writer, Murasaki Shikibu from 1000 years ago.

2004 Series (Series E):

Denomination	Obverse	Reverse
JPY 1000	Noguchi Hideyo	Mount Fuji, Lake Motosuko and Cherry blossoms
JPY 5000	Higuchi Ichiyō	Kakitsubata-zu (Painting of Irises, a work by Ogata Korin)
JPY 10,000	Fukuzawa Yukichi	Statue of hōō (phoenix) from Byōdō-in Temple

== Jersey ==
Banknotes of the Jersey pound (JEP) are issued in Jersey. The motifs used are:

Denomination	Obverse	Reverse
JEP 1	Queen Elizabeth II	St. Helier Parish Church (commemorative showing Mont Orgueil also in circulation)
JEP 5	Queen Elizabeth II	La Corbière lighthouse
JEP 10	Queen Elizabeth II	The Death of Major Pierson, Battle of Jersey
JEP 20	Queen Elizabeth II	St. Ouen's manor
JEP 50	Queen Elizabeth II	Government House

== Korea, South ==
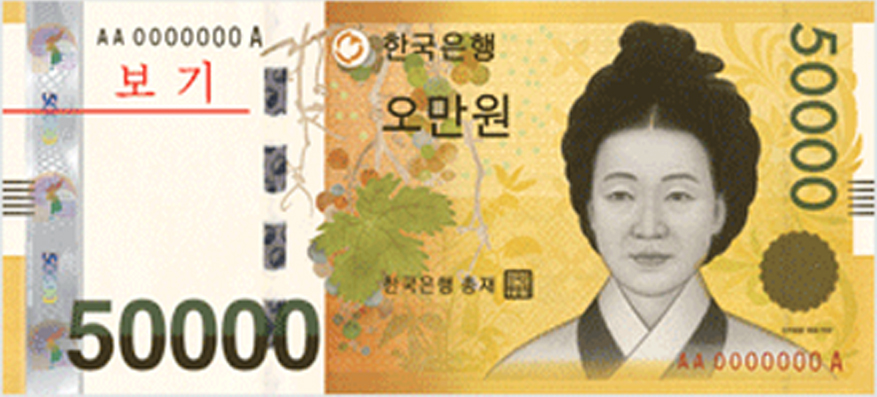
Obverse side of a South Korean note of 50,000 won

The official currency of South Korea is the South Korean Won (KRW). The motifs used are:

Denomination	Obverse	Reverse
KRW 1000	Yi Hwang; Seonggyungwan	Dosan Seowon (Kyesang Jeonggeodo)
KRW 5000	Yi I Ojukheon	Chochoongdo
KRW 10,000	King Sejong the Great; Irworobongdo; Yongbieocheonga	Honcheonsigye, Cheonsang Yeolcha Bunyajido
KRW 50,000	Shin Saimdang	Poongjukdo

== Lithuania ==
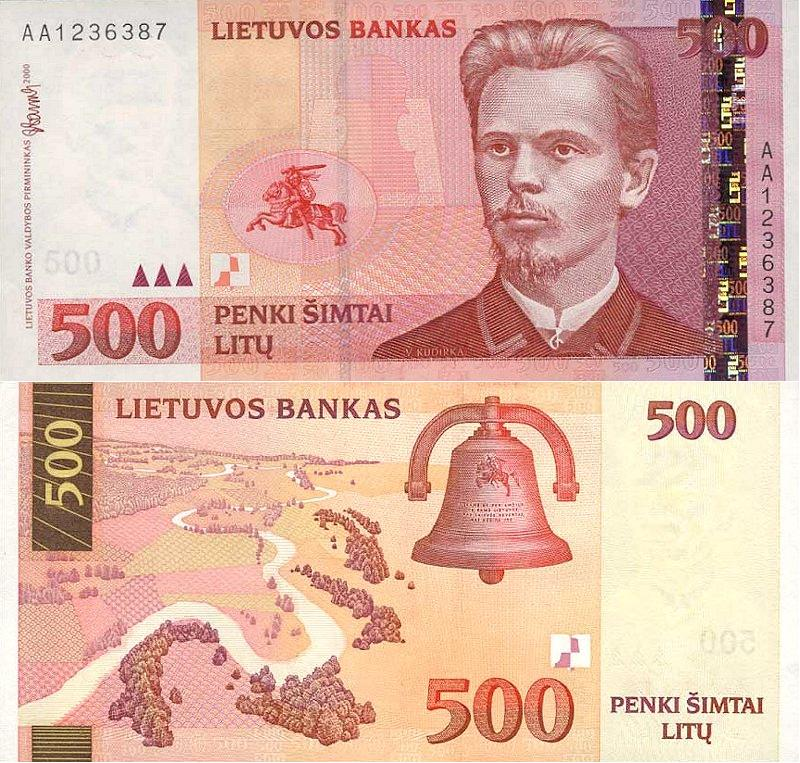
500litas banknote (obverse and reverse)

The former currency of Lithuania is the Lithuanian litas (LTL). The motifs used are:

Denomination	Obverse	Reverse
LTL 1 (no longer in print)	Žemaitė	Wooden church of Palūšė
LTL 2 (no longer in print)	Motiejus Valančius	Trakai Island Castle
LTL 5 (no longer in print)	Jonas Jablonskis	Sculpture "Vargo mokykla" (School of Hardship) by Petras Rimša
LTL 10	Steponas Darius and Stasys Girėnas	Lituanica flying over the Atlantic Ocean
LTL 20	Maironis	Vytautas the Great War Museum and its carillon tower, the Statue of Liberty in Kaunas
LTL 50	Jonas Basanavičius	Vilnius Cathedral and its belfry, Monument to Grand Duke Gediminas, Gediminas Tower and the Hill of Three Crosses
LTL 100	Simonas Daukantas	Vilnius Old Town: Vilnius University and the Church of St. Johns
LTL 200	Vydūnas	Lighthouse in Klaipėda
LTL 500	Vincas Kudirka	Loops of the Neman River

== Malaysia ==
The official currency of Malaysia is the Malaysian ringgit (MYR). The motifs used are:

Denomination	Obverse	Reverse
MYR 1	Tuanku Abdul Rahman	Cultural & Tourism Industry
MYR 2	Tuanku Abdul Rahman	Telecommunication Industry
MYR 5	Tuanku Abdul Rahman	ICT Technology
MYR 10	Tuanku Abdul Rahman	Transportation Industry
MYR 50	Tuanku Abdul Rahman	Petrochemical industry
MYR 100	Tuanku Abdul Rahman	Heavy Industry

2012 version

Denomination	Obverse	Reverse
MYR 1	Tuanku Abdul Rahman	Wau bulan
MYR 5	Tuanku Abdul Rahman	Rhinoceros hornbill
MYR 10	Tuanku Abdul Rahman	Rafflesia
MYR 20	Tuanku Abdul Rahman	Hawksbill and leatherback turtle
MYR 50	Tuanku Abdul Rahman	Malaysia's first Prime Minister, Tunku Abdul Rahman Putra Al-Haj, Agriculture Industry
MYR 100	Tuanku Abdul Rahman	Mount Kinabalu and pinnacles rock formations of Gunung Api valley

== New Zealand ==
The official currency of New Zealand is the New Zealand Dollar (NZD). The motifs used are:

Denomination	Obverse	Reverse
NZD 5	Sir Edmund Hillary; Aoraki / Mount Cook	Hoiho (yellow-eyed penguin)
NZD 10	Kate Sheppard; White camellia flowers	Whio (blue duck)
NZD 20	Queen Elizabeth II; New Zealand Parliament Buildings	Kārearea (New Zealand falcon)
NZD 50	Sir Āpirana Ngata; Porourangi Meeting House	Kōkako (blue wattled crow)
NZD 100	Lord Rutherford of Nelson; Nobel Prize medal	Mohua (yellowhead)

== Norway ==
The official currency of Norway is the Norwegian krone (NOK). The motifs used are:

Denomination	Obverse	Reverse
NOK 50	Peter Chr. Asbjørnsen	Water lilies
NOK 100	Kirsten Flagstad	Norwegian National Opera
NOK 200	Kristian Birkeland	Northern lights
NOK 500	Sigrid Undset	Wreath
NOK 1000	Edvard Munch	Sun (painting by Munch)

== Pakistan ==
The official currency of Pakistan is the Pakistani rupee (PKR). The motifs used are:

Denomination	Obverse	Reverse
PKR 5	Muhammad Ali Jinnah	Gwadar Sea Port, Gawadar, Balochistan.
PKR 10	Muhammad Ali Jinnah	Entrance to the Khyber Pass, Khyber Agency, FATA.
PKR 20	Muhammad Ali Jinnah	Mohenjo-daro near Larkana
PKR 50	Muhammad Ali Jinnah	Karakoram 2 (K2) mountain in Gilgit Baltistan
PKR 100	Muhammad Ali Jinnah	Quaid-e-Azam's Residency in Ziarat
PKR 500	Muhammad Ali Jinnah	Badshahi Mosque in Lahore
PKR 1000	Muhammad Ali Jinnah	Islamia College Peshawar in Peshawar
PKR 5000	Muhammad Ali Jinnah	Shah Faisal Mosque in Islamabad

== Paraguay ==
Obverse of a 1000 Paraguayan guaraní banknote.

The official currency of Paraguay is the Paraguayan guaraní (PYG). The motifs used are:

Denomination	Obverse	Reverse
PYG 1000	Francisco Solano López	Oratorio de la Virgen de la Asunción and Panteón Nacional de los Héroes
PYG 2000	Adela and Celsa Speratti	Parade with flags
PYG 5000	Carlos Antonio López	Palacio de los López
PYG 10,000	José Gaspar Rodríguez de Francia	Historical scene from 1811
PYG 20,000	Paraguayan woman	Central Bank of Paraguay building in Asunción
PYG 50,000	Paraguayan soldier	Casa de la Independencia
PYG 50,000 (2007 version)	Agustín Pío Barrios	Guitar labeled "Mangore"
PYG 100,000	Roque González de Santa Cruz	The Itaipu Dam

== Peru ==
The official currency of Peru is the Peruvian sol (PEN). The motifs used are:

Denomination	Obverse
PEN 10	José Quiñones Gonzales
PEN 20	Raúl Porras Barrenechea
PEN 50	Abraham Valdelomar Pinto
PEN 100	Jorge Basadre Grohmann
PEN 200	Saint Rose of Lima

== Philippines ==
The official currency of the Philippines is the Philippine peso (PHP). The motifs used are:

Denomination	Obverse	Reverse
PHP 5	Emilio Aguinaldo	Scene from the Philippine Declaration of Independence
PHP 10	Apolinario Mabini	Barasoain Church
PHP 10 (Centennial Series)	Apolinario Mabini and Andres Bonifacio	Barasoain Church and the initiation rites of the Katipunan
PHP 20	Manuel L. Quezon, Declaration of Filipino as the national language, Malacañan Palace	Banaue Rice Terraces, palm civet, Cordilleras weave design
PHP 50	Sergio Osmeña, First Philippine Assembly, Leyte Landing	Taal Lake in Batangas, giant trevally, Batangas embroidery design
PHP 100	Manuel A. Roxas, Old BSP building in Intramuros, Manila, Inauguration of the Third Philippine Republic	Mayon Volcano in Albay, Whale shark, Bicol textile design
PHP 200	Diosdado P. Macapagal, EDSA People Power 2001, Aguinaldo Shrine in Kawit, Cavite, Barasoain Church in Malolos, Bulacan, the swearing-in of Gloria Macapagal Arroyo as president	Chocolate Hills in Bohol, Philippine tarsier, Visayas weave design
PHP 500	Corazon C. Aquino, Benigno S. Aquino, Jr., EDSA People Power I, Benigno Aquino monument in Makati	Subterranean Underground River in Puerto Princesa, Palawan, blue-naped parrot, Southern Philippines cloth design
PHP 1000	José Abad Santos, Vicente Lim, Josefa Llanes Escoda; Centennial celebration of Philippine independence; Medal of Honor, which was awarded to Abad Santos, Lim, and Escoda	Tubbataha Reefs Natural Park in Sulu Sea, South Sea pearl, Mindanao design for T'nalak (Ikat-dyed abaca)

== Poland ==
The official currency of Poland is the Polish złoty (PLN). The motifs used are:

Denomination	Obverse	Reverse
PLN 10	Mieszko I	Silver coin from the reign of Mieszko I
PLN 20	Boleslaus I the Brave	Silver coin from the reign of Boleslaus I
PLN 50	Casimir III the Great	Eagle from the royal seal of Casimir III
PLN 100	Wladislaus II Jagiełło	Eagle from the tombstone of Wladislaus II
PLN 200	Sigismund I the Old	Eagle from the Sigismund Chapel, Wawel Hill
PLN 500	John III Sobieski	Eagle from the royal seal of John III Sobieski, Wilanów Palace

== Romania ==
The official currency of Romania is the Romanian leu (RON). The motifs used are:

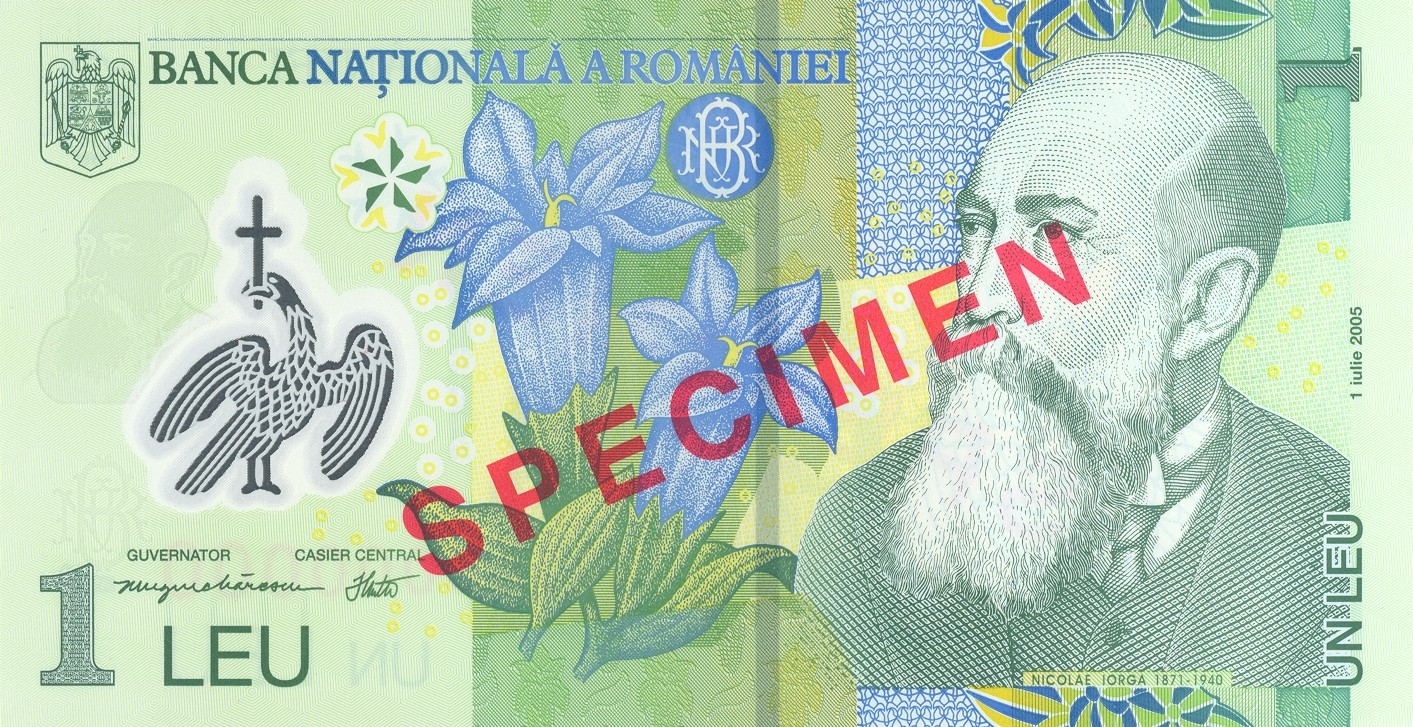
One leu banknote obverse

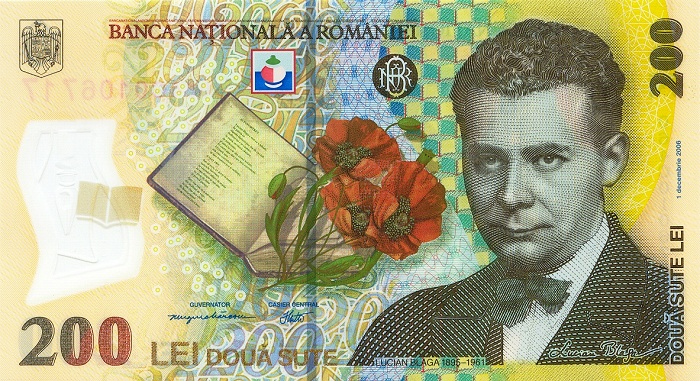
Two hundred lei banknote obverse. The newest banknote.

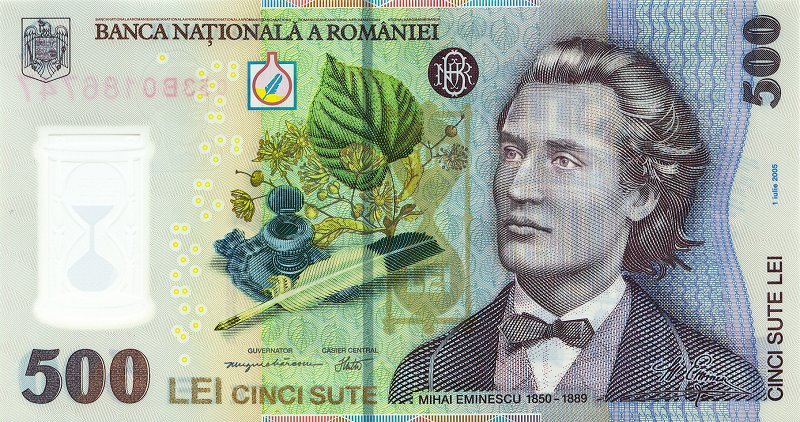
Five hundred lei banknote obverse

Denomination	Obverse	Reverse
RON 1	Nicolae Iorga (1871–1940), Coat of arms of Romania at top left	Curtea de Argeş Cathedral at center-left, the Flag and coat of arms of Wallachia|Wallachian eagle at left
RON 5	George Enescu (1881–1955), Coat of arms of Romania at top left	Romanian Athenaeum concert hall at left, A fragment of the score of the Enescu's opera King Oedipus above. A musician's piano at centre right.
RON 10	Nicolae Grigorescu (1838–1907, Hollyhock flower, an artist's palette and paintbrush	Nicolae Grigorescu's painting "Rodica"
RON 50	Aurel Vlaicu (1882–1913), A mountain flower edelweiss, an aircraft propeller, Coat of arms of Romania at top left	Mountain eagle head, "Vlaicu II" aircraft design and "Gnome" engine sketch
RON 100	Ion Luca Caragiale (1852–1912), Comedy masks and a violet flower	Old building of the Bucharest National Theatre, Caragiale's statue at left
RON 200	Lucian Blaga (1895–1961), Coat of arms of Romania at top left, poppies	A watermill and the Hamangia Thinker
RON 500	Mihai Eminescu (1850–1889), Lime tree blossoms, a quill and an inkpot	Timpul newspaper, University Library in Iaşi

== Russia ==
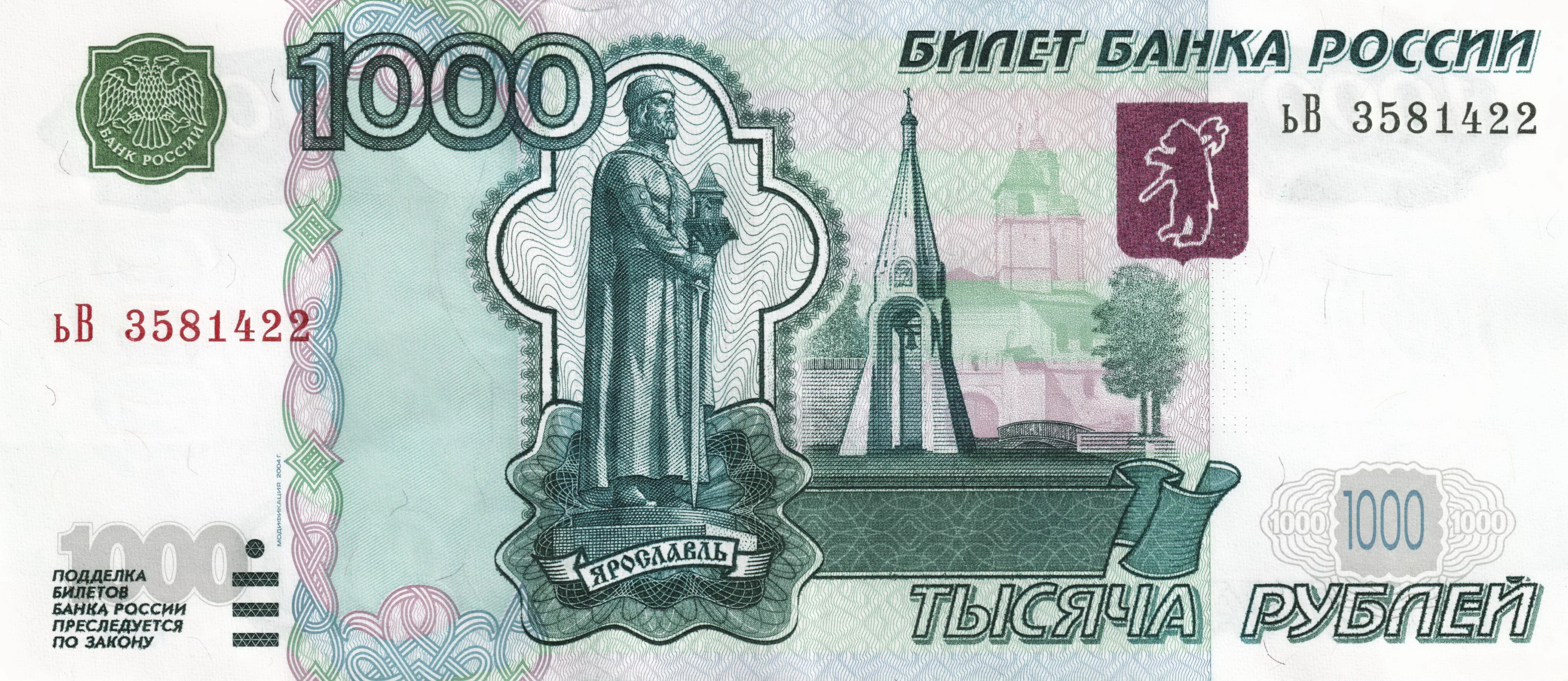
Obverse of a 1000 Russian ruble banknote

The official currency of Russia is the Russian ruble (RUB). The motifs used are:

Denomination	Obverse	Reverse
RUB 10	Krasnoyarsk, chapel and bridge over Yenisei	Krasnoyarsk Dam
RUB 50	Saint Petersburg, Sculpture from Rostral Column	Former stock exchange building
RUB 100 (1997)	Sculpture from Bolshoi Theatre, Moscow	The Bolshoi Theatre
RUB 100 (2022)	Spasskaya Tower, Moscow State University, Shukhov Tower, Ostankino Tower, Zaryadye Park, Moscow	Central Federal District: Rzhev Memorial (Tver Oblast), Kulikovo Field (Tula Oblast), cranes
RUB 200	Monument to the Sunken Ships, Sevastopol	Chersonesus
RUB 500	Peter the Great and Port of Arkhangelsk	Solovetsky Monastery
RUB 1000	Yaroslav the Wise, Chapel of Our Lady of Kazan in Yaroslavl	St. John the Baptist Church, Yaroslavl
RUB 2000	Russky Bridge, Vladivostok	Vostochny Cosmodrome
RUB 5000	Nikolay Muravyov-Amursky, Khabarovsk Cliff	Khabarovsk Bridge

== Serbia ==
The official currency of Serbia is the Serbian dinar (RSD). The motifs used are:

Denomination	Obverse	Reverse
RSD 10	Vuk Stefanović Karadžić	First Slavic Congress in Prague
RSD 20	Petar II Petrović Njegoš	Njegoš' figure, Mount Lovćen
RSD 50	Stevan Stojanović Mokranjac	Motif from Mokranjac's musical score
RSD 100	Nikola Tesla	Tesla's electro-magnetic induction engine
RSD 200	Nadežda Petrović	Gračanica monastery
RSD 500	Jovan Cvijić	Stylized ethnic motifs
RSD 1000	Ðorđe Vajfert	Interior of National Bank of Serbia building
RSD 2000	Milutin Milanković	Sun's disk; fragment of Milanković’s work
RSD 5000	Slobodan Jovanović	Interior of Serbian Parliament

== South Africa ==
The official currency of South Africa is the South African rand (ZAR). The motifs used are:

Denomination	Obverse	Reverse
ZAR 10	Rhinoceros	Agriculture
ZAR 10	Nelson Mandela	Rhinoceros
ZAR 20	Elephant	Mining
ZAR 20	Nelson Mandela	Elephant
ZAR 50	Lion	Manufacturing
ZAR 50	Nelson Mandela	Lion
ZAR 100	Buffalo	Tourism
ZAR 100	Nelson Mandela	Buffalo
ZAR 200	Leopard	Transport and Communications
ZAR 200	Nelson Mandela	Leopard

== Sweden ==
The official currency of Sweden is the Swedish krona (SEK). The motifs used are:

Denomination	Obverse	Description	Reverse	Description
SEK 20	Selma Lagerlöf	First female winner of the Nobel Prize for literature	Nils Holgersson	Lagerlöf character
SEK 50	Jenny Lind	Opera singer	Silver harp	
SEK 100	Carl Linnaeus	Founder of modern taxonomy	Bee pollinating a flower	Combines Linnaeus' interests in botany and zoology
SEK 500	King Charles XI	Bank of Sweden was founded during his reign	Christopher Polhem	Scientist and industrialist
SEK 1000	King Gustav Vasa	United the Swedes	Harvest by Olaus Magnus	Olaus was a historian of the northern peoples

== Switzerland ==
The official currency of Switzerland is the Swiss franc (CHF). The motifs used are:

Denomination	Obverse	Description	Reverse
CHF 10	Le Corbusier	Architect	Le Corbusier's buildings in Chandigarh
CHF 20	Arthur Honegger	Composer	Elements from Honegger's Pacific 231
CHF 50	Sophie Taeuber-Arp	Painter and sculptor	Taeuber-Arp's Dada Head
CHF 100	Alberto Giacometti	Painter and sculptor	Giacometti's Man Walking
CHF 200	Charles Ferdinand Ramuz	Writer	Swiss mountains and Lavaux area
CHF 1000	Jacob Burckhardt	Historian	Detail from the Palazzo Strozzi

== Republic of China (Taiwan) ==
The official currency of Taiwan is the New Taiwan dollar (TWD). The motifs used are:

Denomination	Obverse	Reverse
TWD 100	Sun Yat-sen	Chung-Shan Building
TWD 200	Chiang Kai-shek	The Office of the President
TWD 500	Youth baseball	Formosan sika deer and Dabajian Mountain
TWD 1000	Elementary education	Mikado pheasant and Jade Mountain
TWD 2000	FORMOSAT-1, technology	Formosan landlocked salmon and Nanhu Mountain

== Thailand ==
The official currency of Thailand is the Thai Baht (THB). The motifs used are:

Denomination	Obverse	Reverse
THB 20	King Vajiralongkorn	Kings Buddha Yodfa Chulaloke (Rama I) and Buddha Loetla Nabhalai (Rama II); Grand Palace and Thai mural of a scene from Enau
THB 50	King Vajiralongkorn	Kings Nangklao (Rama III) and Mongkut (Rama IV); Chinese junk and Phra Nakhon Khiri Historical Park
THB 100	King Vajiralongkorn	Kings Chulalongkorn (Rama V) and Vajiravudh (Rama VI); Picture of Chulalongkorn's royal trip to Norway in his second European trip and Picture of Vajiravudh and his National Scout Organization of Thailand
THB 500	King Vajiralongkorn	Kings Prajadhipok (Rama VII) and Ananda Mahidol (Rama VIII); Picture of Granting of the first constitution and Picture of Ananda Mahidol visit to Sampheng after the World War II
THB 1000	King Vajiralongkorn	Kings Bhumibol Adulyadej (Rama IX) and Vajiralongkorn (Rama X); Picture of Bhumibol Adulyadej taking a lotus given by the elder Thoum and Picture of Vajiralongkorn visit to the rural Thailand

== Turkey ==
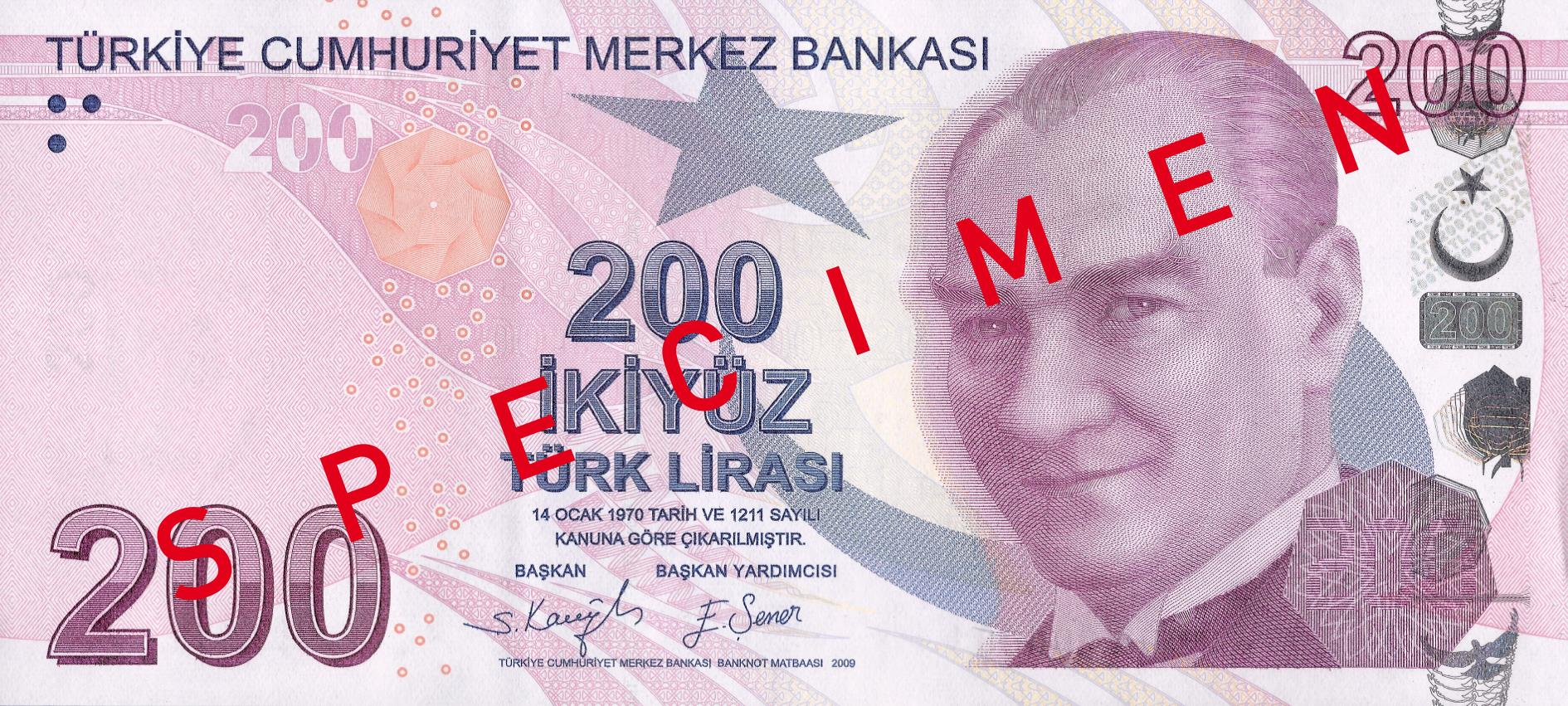
Obverse of the 200 lira banknote

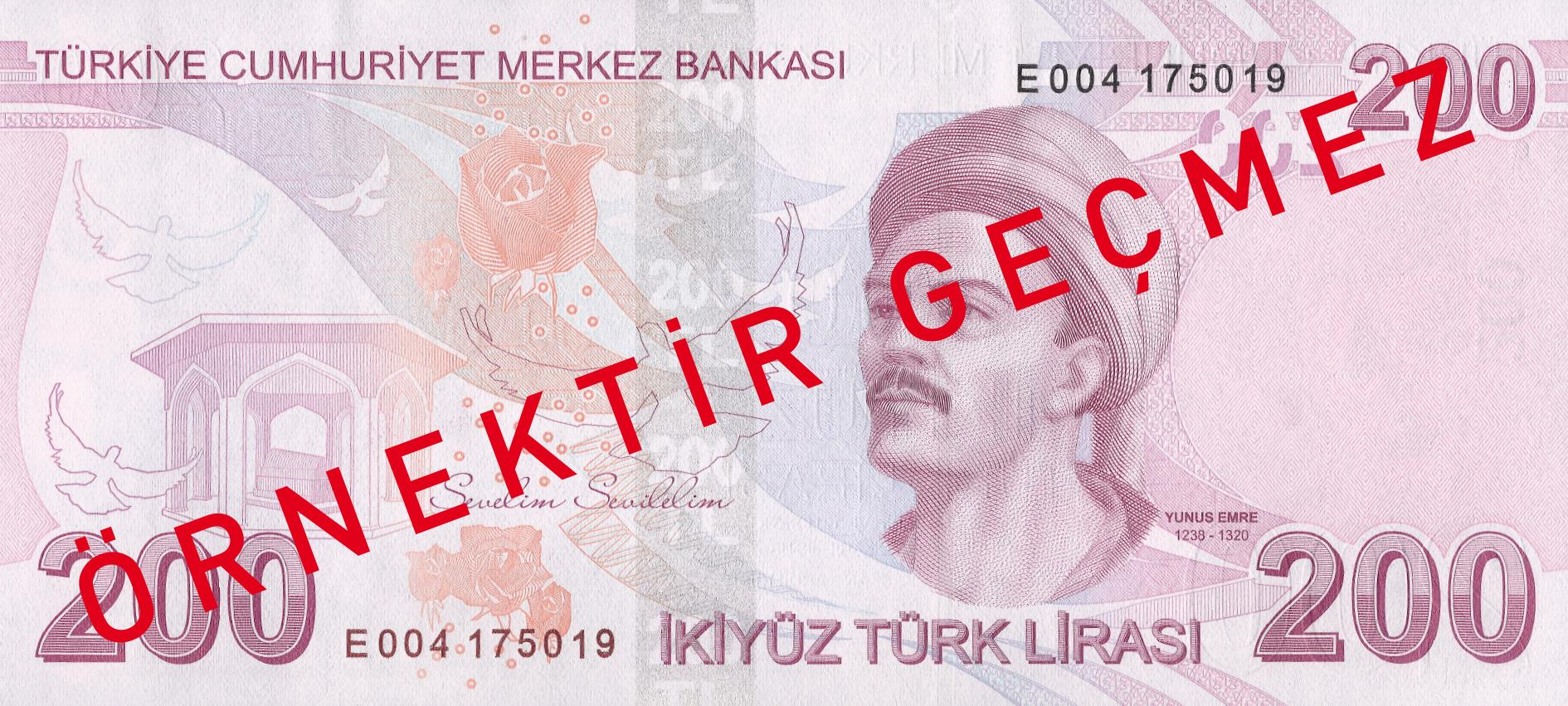
Reverse of the 200 lira banknote

The official currency of Turkey is the Turkish lira (TRY). The motifs used are:

Denomination	Obverse	Reverse	Description
TRY 5	Mustafa Kemal Atatürk (1881–1938)	Aydın Sayılı (1913–1993)	Historian of science
TRY 10	Mustafa Kemal Atatürk	Cahit Arf (1910–1997)	Mathematician
TRY 20	Mustafa Kemal Atatürk	Mimar Kemaleddin (1870–1927)	Architect
TRY 50	Mustafa Kemal Atatürk	Fatma Aliye Topuz (1862–1936)	Writer
TRY 100	Mustafa Kemal Atatürk	Buhurizade Itri (1640? - 1711)	Composer
TRY 200	Mustafa Kemal Atatürk	Yunus Emre	Poet

== Ukraine ==
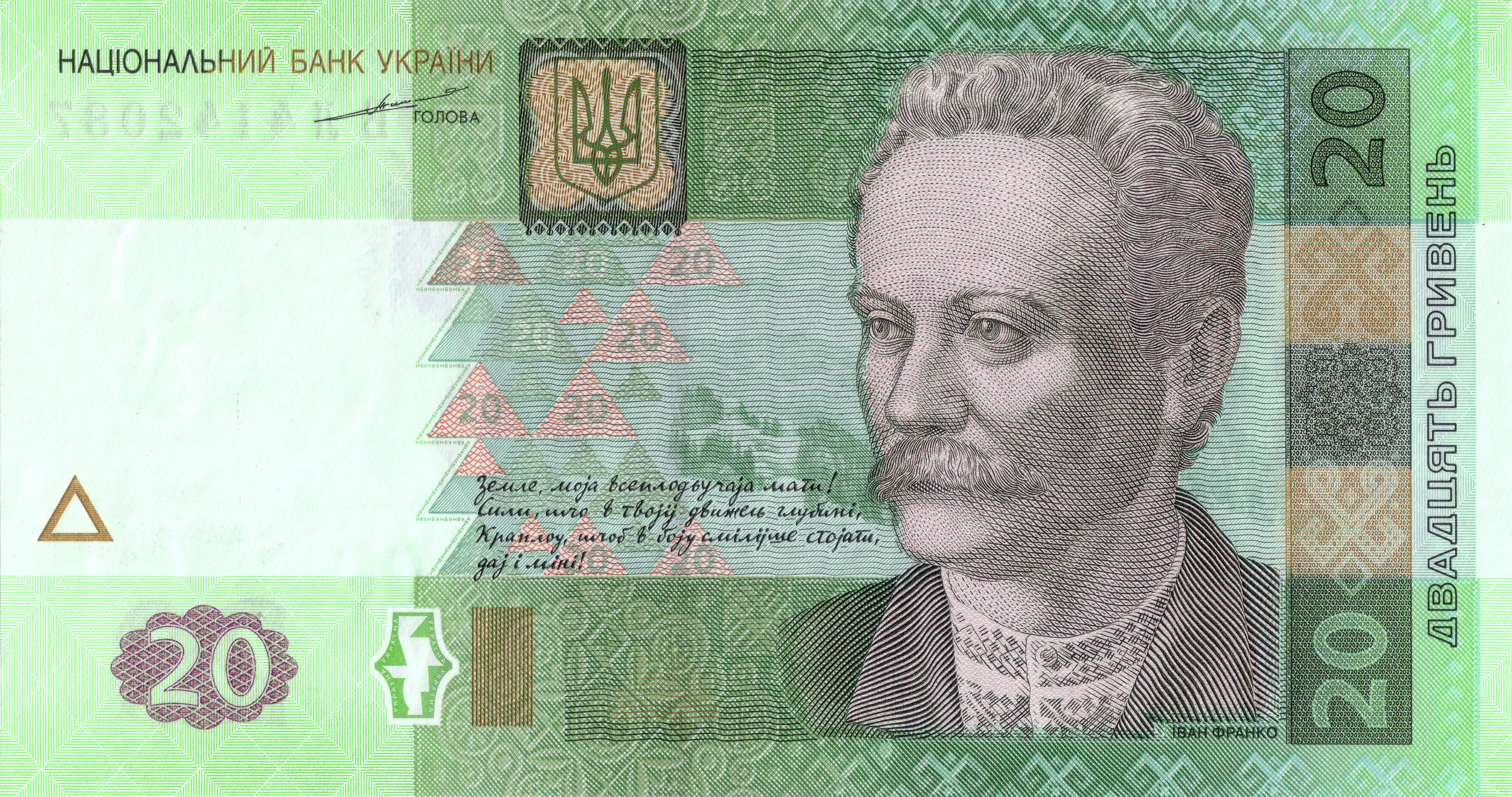
Obverse of a 20 Ukrainian hryvnia banknote, 2003

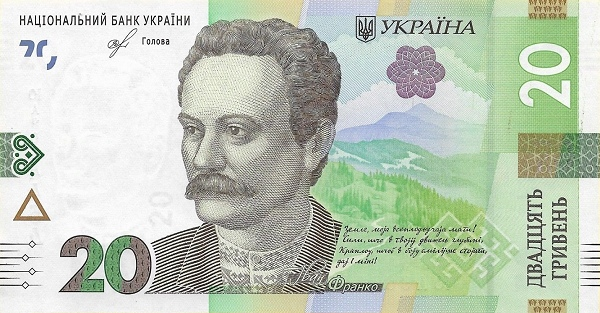
Obverse of a 20 Ukrainian hryvnia banknote, 2018

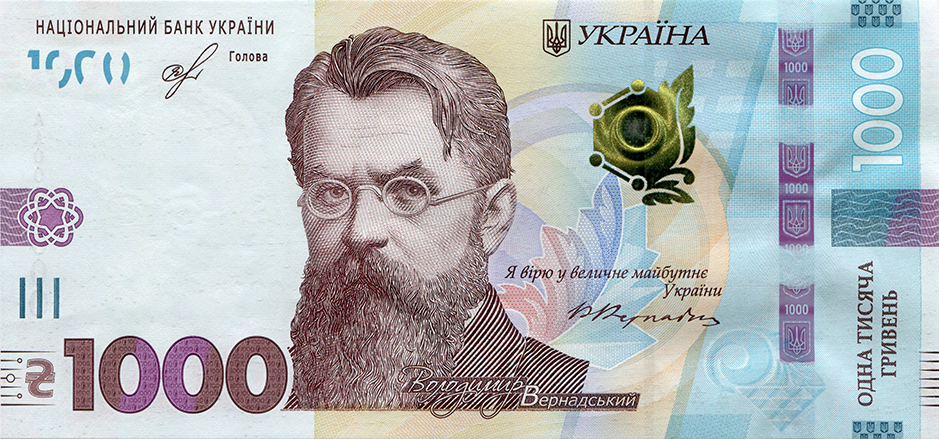
Obverse of a 1000 Ukrainian hryvnia banknote, 2019

The official currency of Ukraine is the Ukrainian hryvnia (UAH). The motifs used are:

Denomination	Obverse	Description	Reverse
UAH 1	Volodymyr the Great	First Christian ruler	Kyiv in the time of Kievan Rus'
UAH 2	Yaroslav the Wise	Prince of Kievan Rus'	Saint Sophia Cathedral in Kyiv
UAH 5	Bohdan Khmelnytskyi	Father of the nation	A church in Subotiv
UAH 10	Ivan Mazepa	National hero	Cave Monastery in Kyiv
UAH 20	Ivan Franko	Writer and thinker	Opera house in Lviv
UAH 50	Mykhailo Hrushevsky	Historian and statesman	Parliament building in Kyiv
UAH 100	Taras Shevchenko	Writer, artist, founder of modern written Ukrainian language	Dnieper
UAH 200	Lesya Ukrainka	Writer	Fortress in Lutsk
UAH 500	Hryhoriy Skovoroda	Philosopher and composer	Mohyla Academy in Kyiv
UAH 1000	Vladimir Vernadsky	Scientist and philosopher	The building of the Presidium of the National Academy of Sciences of Ukraine

== United Kingdom ==
The currency of the UK is the pound sterling, represented by the symbol £. The Bank of England is the central bank, responsible for issuing currency. Banks in Scotland and Northern Ireland retain the right to issue their own notes, subject to retaining enough Bank of England notes in reserve to cover the issue.

=== England & Wales ===
The official currency of England is the pound sterling (GBP). The motifs used are:

Denomination	Obverse	Reverse	Description
GBP 5	Queen Elizabeth II	Winston Churchill	Prime Minister of the United Kingdom, 1940–1945, and 1951–1955
GBP 5	King Charles III	Winston Churchill	Prime Minister of the United Kingdom, 1940–1945, and 1951–1955
GBP 10	Queen Elizabeth II	Jane Austen	Author
GBP 10	King Charles III	Jane Austen	Author
GBP 20	Queen Elizabeth II	J. M. W. Turner	Painter
GBP 20	King Charles III	J. M. W. Turner	Painter
GBP 50	Queen Elizabeth II	Alan Turing	Computer scientist and World War II codebreaker
GBP 50	King Charles III	Alan Turing	Computer scientist and World War II codebreaker

=== Scotland ===
The official currency of Scotland is the Pound sterling (GBP). Under Scottish legislation, banknotes are issued by commercial banks, not the government. The motifs issued by the Bank of Scotland are:

Denomination	Obverse	Reverse
GBP 5 (Tercentenary series (1995))	Sir Walter Scott	vignette of oil and energy
GBP 5 (Bridges series (2007))	Sir Walter Scott	Brig o' Doon
GBP 10 (Tercentenary series (1995))	Sir Walter Scott	vignette of distilling and brewing
GBP 10 (Bridges series (2007))	Sir Walter Scott	Glenfinnan Viaduct
GBP 20 (Tercentenary series (1995))	Sir Walter Scott	vignette of education and research
GBP 20 (Bridges series (2007))	Sir Walter Scott	Forth Bridge
GBP 50 (Tercentenary series (1995))	Sir Walter Scott	vignette of arts and culture
GBP 50 (Bridges series (2007))	Sir Walter Scott	Falkirk Wheel
GBP 100 (Tercentenary series (1995))	Sir Walter Scott	vignette of leisure and tourism
GBP 100 (Bridges series (2007))	Sir Walter Scott	Kessock Bridge

The Royal Bank of Scotland issues:

Denomination	Obverse	Reverse
GBP 1	Lord Ilay	Edinburgh Castle
GBP 5	Lord Ilay	Culzean Castle
GBP 10	Lord Ilay	Glamis Castle
GBP 20	Lord Ilay	Brodick Castle
GBP 50	Lord Ilay	Inverness Castle
GBP 100	Lord Ilay	Balmoral Castle

The Clydesdale Bank issues:

Denomination	Obverse	Reverse
GBP 5	Robert Burns	vignette of mouse and rose
GBP 5	Alexander Fleming	vignette of St. Kilda
GBP 10	Mary Slessor	vignette of Nigeria and missionary work
GBP 10	Robert Burns	vignette of the Old and New Towns of Edinburgh
GBP 20	Robert the Bruce	vignette of Bruce, Wallace, Stirling Castle
GBP 20	Robert the Bruce	vignette of the New Lanark textile factory
GBP 50	Adam Smith	vignette of 18th century engineering and agriculture
GBP 50	Elsie Inglis	vignette of the Antonine Wall
GBP 100	Lord Kelvin	Kelvin's university lecture room
GBP 100	Charles Rennie Macintosh	vignette of the Heart of Neolithic Orkney, Maes Howe rock monuments, the Stones of Stenness, the Ring of Brodgar, and the Skara Brae rock formation (Orkney Islands)

== United States ==
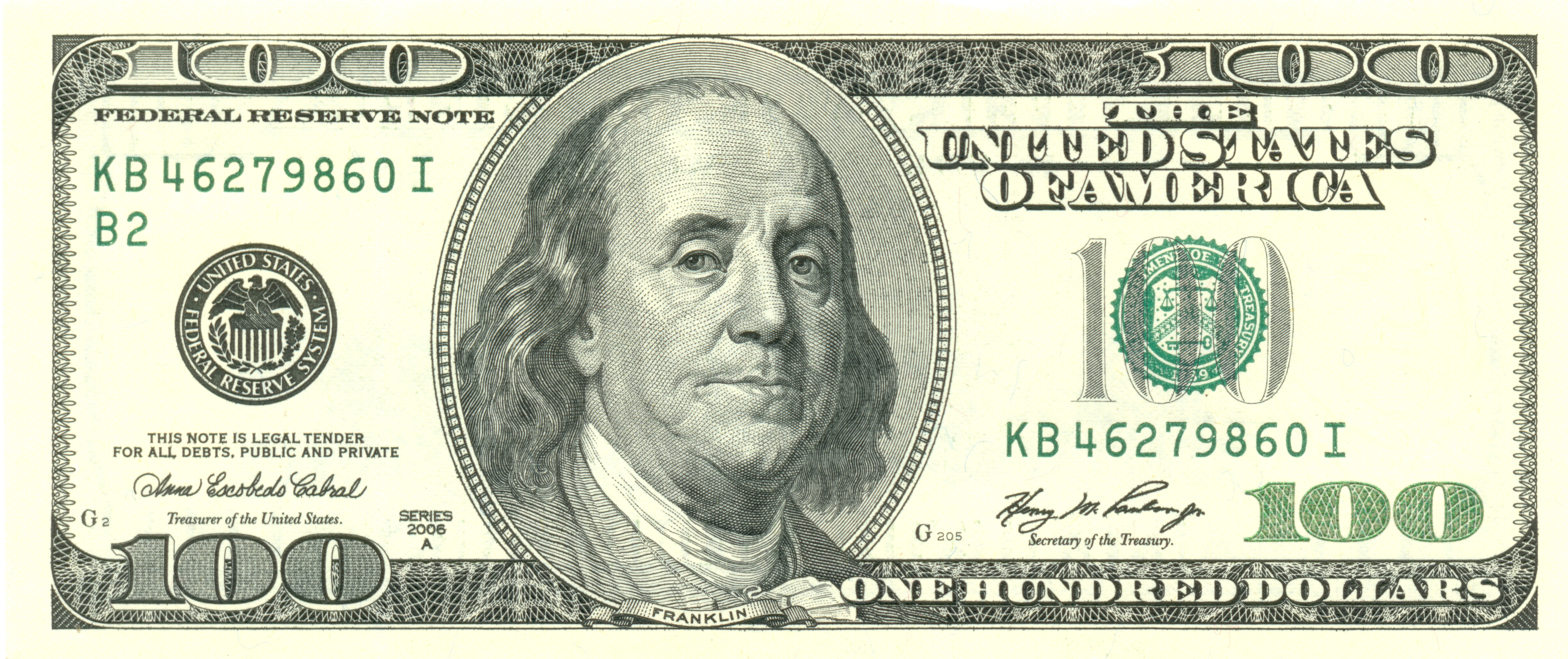
Obverse of a 100 U.S. dollar banknote

The official currency of the United States is the United States dollar (USD). The motifs used are:

Denomination	Obverse	Description	Reverse
USD 1	George Washington	First President	Great Seal of the United States
USD 2	Thomas Jefferson	Third President	Declaration of Independence
USD 5	Abraham Lincoln	16th President	Lincoln Memorial
USD 10	Alexander Hamilton	First Secretary of the Treasury	Treasury Building
USD 20	Andrew Jackson	Seventh President	White House
USD 50	Ulysses S. Grant	18th President	Capitol
USD 100	Benjamin Franklin	Founding Father	Independence Hall

== See also ==
- List of people on banknotes
