= Bornhöved Burial Mound =

In 2018, as part of the Collaborative Research Center "Scales of Transformations" (CRC1266) at Kiel University and led by Jutta Kneisel and Vera Hubensack, an excavation was carried out on the burial mound LA 117 in Bornhöved. This mound was notable not only for its unusual construction but also for the significant role fire played in the burial process.

Although the excavation yielded only a few artifacts, an interdisciplinary research team was able to analyze the construction phases of the burial mound and the different periods of use of the site.

== Location and context ==
Burial mound LA 117 is part of a group of five mounds situated on a southwest–northeast oriented moraine ridge. This ridge is home to more than 280 burial mounds. A well-known site in the vicinity is "Mang de Bargen."

LA 117 itself was relatively shallow and located on a small moraine hill, barely visible in the landscape. Despite its modest height of approximately 0.30 m and a diameter of about 17.5 m, it was clearly recognizable as an artificial elevation. Radiocarbon dating (14C) determined that the mound was constructed between 1884 and 1736 cal BC, marking its initial phase.

== The temporal sequence ==
=== The central grave ===
The central grave measured 2.78 × 1.41 m and was dug about 1 meter deep into the sandy subsoil at the core of the mound. In its lower section, a faint "body shadow" was detected, suggesting a crouched burial oriented northwest–southeast, with the head positioned to the south. No other body burials were preserved, but given that the mound was originally much higher, it is likely that additional burials once existed. However, seven urn burials were found along the mound's perimeter.

=== The role of fire ===
A distinctive feature of the site was a reconstructed trench surrounding the grave. Charred oak beams and hazelwood, possibly remnants of wattle construction, were found encircling the entire mound. Additionally, remains of false oat grass (Arrhenatherum elatius), which could have been used as tinder, were discovered. These findings suggest that a wooden structure once enclosed the burial and was deliberately set on fire. This event took place more than a century after the mound’s construction, between 1661 and 1509 cal BC.

=== Later modifications ===
Between 1396 and 1195 cal BC, a ring of 16 wooden posts was erected at a distance of 3.5–4 m around the mound, forming a slightly oval shape measuring approximately 20 × 17 meters. The posts, preserved at depths of 50–70 cm, had postholes with diameters of 20–30 cm. Following this modification, additional urn burials were added to the site.

== Cultural significance ==
The burial mound LA 117 reveals a dynamic history of construction, reconstruction, ritual practices, and secondary usage. Particularly noteworthy is the fire-setting event in the 17th/16th century BC. Fire has played a crucial role in rituals and transformative processes for millennia. During the Bronze Age, the shift from inhumation to cremation and the use of urns as containers for cremated remains exemplify this cultural transformation. The evidence from Bornhöved reinforces this historical pattern.
