= Caragiale (surname) =

Caragiale is a surname in Romania, associated with several members of a theatrical and literary family:

- Ion Luca Caragiale, playwright, short story writer and journalist, a leading figure in Romanian literature
- Costache and Iorgu Caragiale, theater managers and dramaturgs, Ion Luca's uncles
- Mateiu Caragiale, novelist and short story writer, Ion Luca's oldest son
- Luca Caragiale, poet, Ion Luca's youngest son

== See also ==
- I. L. Caragiale, Dâmbovița, a commune in Dâmboviţa County
- I. L. Caragiale National Theatre
- Statue of Ion Luca Caragiale (Bucharest)
