= Banknotes of Denmark, 1997 series =

Series of Danish banknotes

The 1997 series of Danish Banknotes are part of the physical form of Denmark's currency, the Danish Krone (kr.), issued by Danmarks Nationalbank. The 1997 series commenced in March 1997 and has since been replaced by the 2009 series. As of 2025, they are no longer legal tender and have been taken out of circulation.

The series was introduced gradually between 1997 and 1999. Its issue began on 10 March 1997 with the debut of the 200 kr. denomination, issued to bridge the gap between the 100 kr. and 500 kr. denominations. Between 2002 and 2005 the security features of the notes were improved to include holograms and fluorescent elements. In 2006, the national bank began designing new banknotes to replace this series. It officially began to be phased out with the issuance of the new 50 kr. banknote on 11 August 2009.

The 1997 series was printed on cotton paper with metallic threads. Each banknote features a portrait of famous Danish artist or scientist beside a rosette with the note's denomination. The reverse side of each note depicts an early stone relief from a Danish church. The banknotes within the series are all the same height (72mm), though each denomination has a different width in order to make the notes distinguishable to those with visual impairments.

== 50-kroner note ==
50 kroner note

Danmarks Nationalbank issued the 50 kroner bank note (DKK50) on 7 May 1999 and updated it on 25 August 2005. It has been out of print since 11 August 2009.

Danish writer Karen Blixen is featured on the front side of the bill and decorated with flowers, which Blixen was said to be fond. The design on the reverse is inspired by a stone relief centaur from Landet Church on the island of Tåsinge.

The 50 krone banknote has the word "femti", not "halvtreds" which is the usual Danish word for fifty. Femti is a word used for cheques. The Danish National bank first used it on the 50 krone banknote issued in 1957, and the 1997 banknote is thus the third to use this word. However, on the new banknote issued on 11 August 2009 the word "halvtreds" is used instead of "femti".

== 100-kroner note ==
100 kroner note

Danmarks Nationalbank issued the 100 kroner bank note (DKK100) on 22 November 1999 and updated it on 27 November 2002. It has been out of print since 4 May 2010.

Danish composer Carl Nielsen is featured on the front side of the bill. The reverse of the 100-kroner banknote shows a basilisk from Tømmerby Church in Vester Hanherred in northern Denmark. Around half of all Danish banknotes in circulation are 100-kroner banknotes, making it the principal banknote in the series.

The 100-kroner bill is sometimes referred to as a hund (Danish for 'dog'), from a shortening of the word hundrede (a hundred).

== 200-kroner note ==
200 kroner note

Danmarks Nationalbank issued the 200 kroner bank note (DKK200) on 10 March 1997 and updated it on 9 April 2003. It has been out of print since 19 October 2010.

Danish actress Johanne Luise Heiberg is featured on the front side of the bill, while a lion from the apse of Viborg Cathedral is featured on the reverse side.

== 500-kroner note ==
500 kroner note

Danmarks Nationalbank issued the 500 kroner bank note (DKK500) on 12 September 1997 and updated it on 24 September 2003. It has been out of print since 15 February 2011.

Danish nuclear physicist Niels Bohr is featured on the front of the bill. The Danish Central Bank was heavily criticized by the Danish Cancer Society for choosing a portrait of Dr Bohr smoking a pipe, in an age of smoking bans. A knight in armour fighting a dragon is featured on the reverse side which was derived from a stone relief from Lihme Church in northern Jutland.

The 500 kroner bill is sometimes referred to as a plovmand (ploughman) because previous issues of the bill featured a picture of a man with a plough.

== 1000-kroner note ==
1000 kroner note

Danmarks Nationalbank issued the 1000 kroner bank note (DKK1000) on 18 September 1998 and updated on 25 November 2004.

Danish artists Anna and Michael Ancher are featured on the front side of the bill. The portraits featured on the banknote were inspired by two paintings by Danish artist Peder Severin Krøyer made in 1884, and originally hung on the walls in the dining room at Brøndums Hotel in Skagen. The anchor background pattern on the banknote does not directly refer to the artists' surname (anker means anchor in Danish), but to a necklace worn by Anna. The back of the banknote shows a tournament scene from a sepulchral monument in Bislev Church near Nibe.

The 1000 kroner bill is sometimes referred to as a tudse (toad), from a word play on the word tusinde (a thousand). It was the largest denomination of the 1997 series. The banknote is 165 mm x 72 mm.

== Security features ==
The design of each banknote in the series incorporates various security devices. When the banknotes are tilted, various motifs appear in the hologram, including a hologram showing its value in both Roman and Arabic numbers. Fluorescent colours, which are visible under ultraviolet light, are also used on both sides of the banknotes. Some of these features were not part of the series' original run, but were integrated between 2002 and 2005.

50 kroner: The hologram alternately shows the figure 50, the Roman numeral L and a flower. Fluorescent effects: Centaur on obverse and green print on the reverse.

100 kroner: Hologram: Two musical notes, the Roman numeral "C." and the number "100." When the note is tilted the "C" grows larger and a rainbow appears. Using a magnifying glass, it is possible to see a microprinted "100" in the outer line around the letter "C." Fluorescent effects: Basilisk on obverse and orange print on the reverse.

200 kroner: Hologram: A lion, the Roman numeral "CC," and the number "200." When the note is tilted the "CC" grows larger. Fluorescent effects: Lion on obverse and green print on the reverse.

500 kroner: Hologram: An atom, the number 500, and the Roman numeral "D". The current version of the 500 kroner banknote was designed to be very hard to counterfeit. The hologram cannot be colour copied. Fluorescent effects: Knight on obverse and orange print on the reverse.

1000 kroner: Hologram: A palette, the number 1000 and the Roman numeral "M". Fluorescent effects: Horseman on obverse and orange print on the reverse.

== List of notes ==
1997 Series
Value	Dimensions	Main colour	Description			Date of	
Value	Dimensions	Main colour	Obverse	Reverse	Watermark	first printing	issue
50 kroner	125 × 72 mm	Purple	Karen Blixen	Centaur from Landet Church	As portrait	1999; 2005	7 May 1999; 25 August 2005
100 kroner	135 × 72 mm	Orange	Carl Nielsen	Basilisk from Tømmerby Church	As portrait	1999; 2002	22 November 1999; 27 November 2002
200 kroner	145 × 72 mm	Green	Johanne Luise Heiberg	Lion from Viborg Cathedral	As portrait	1997; 2003	10 March 1997; 9 April 2003
500 kroner	155 × 72 mm	Blue	Niels Bohr	Knight fighting a dragon from Lihme Church	As portrait	1997; 2003	12 September 1997; 24 September 2003
1000 kroner	165 × 72 mm	Red	Anna, Michael Ancher	Tournament from Bislev Church	Anna Ancher	1998; 2004	18 September 1998; 25 November 2004
For table standards, see the banknote specification table.
