= Mang de Bargen =

German archaeological site

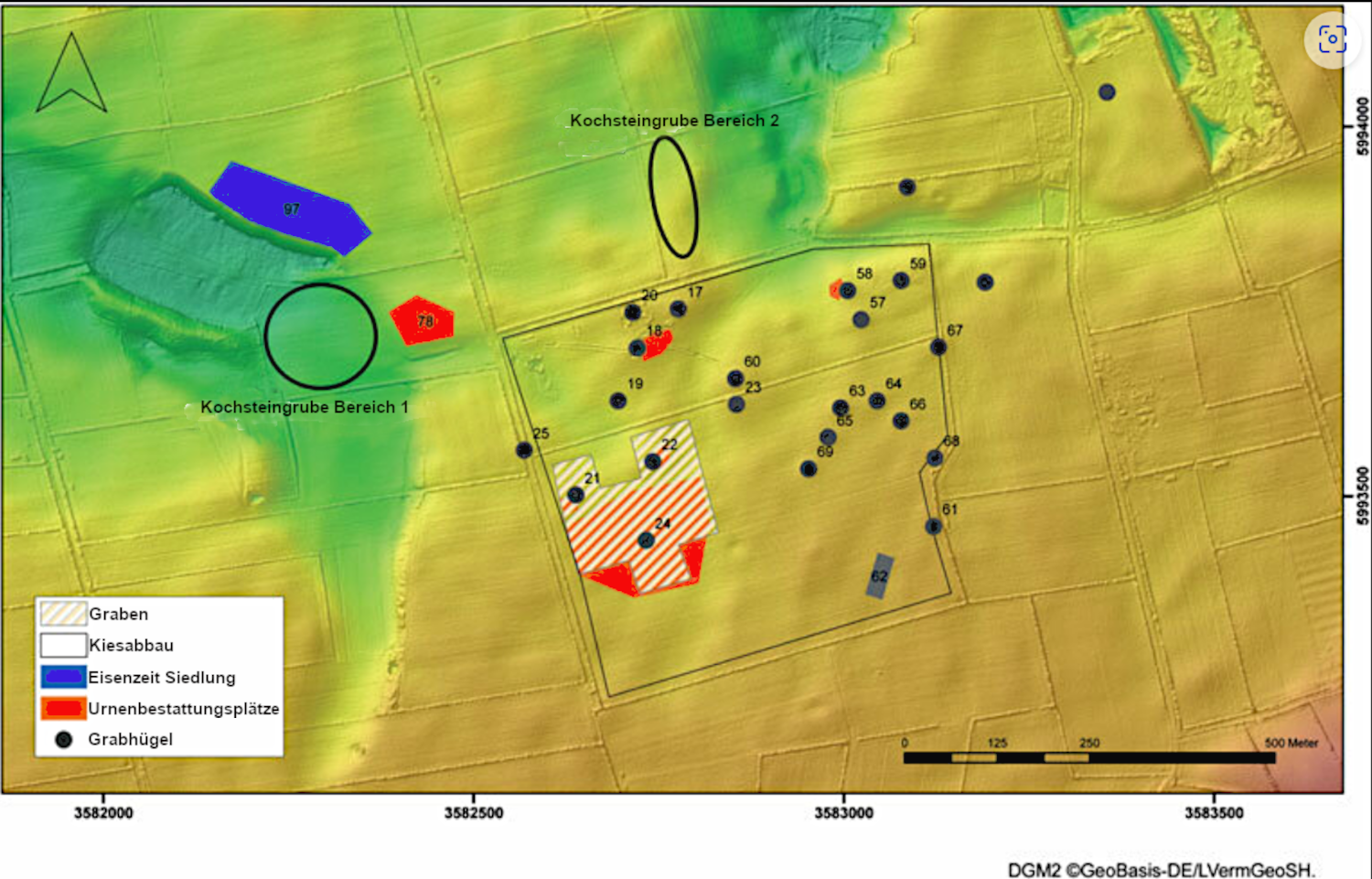
Site plan of the Mang de Bargen site with cemetery and settlements

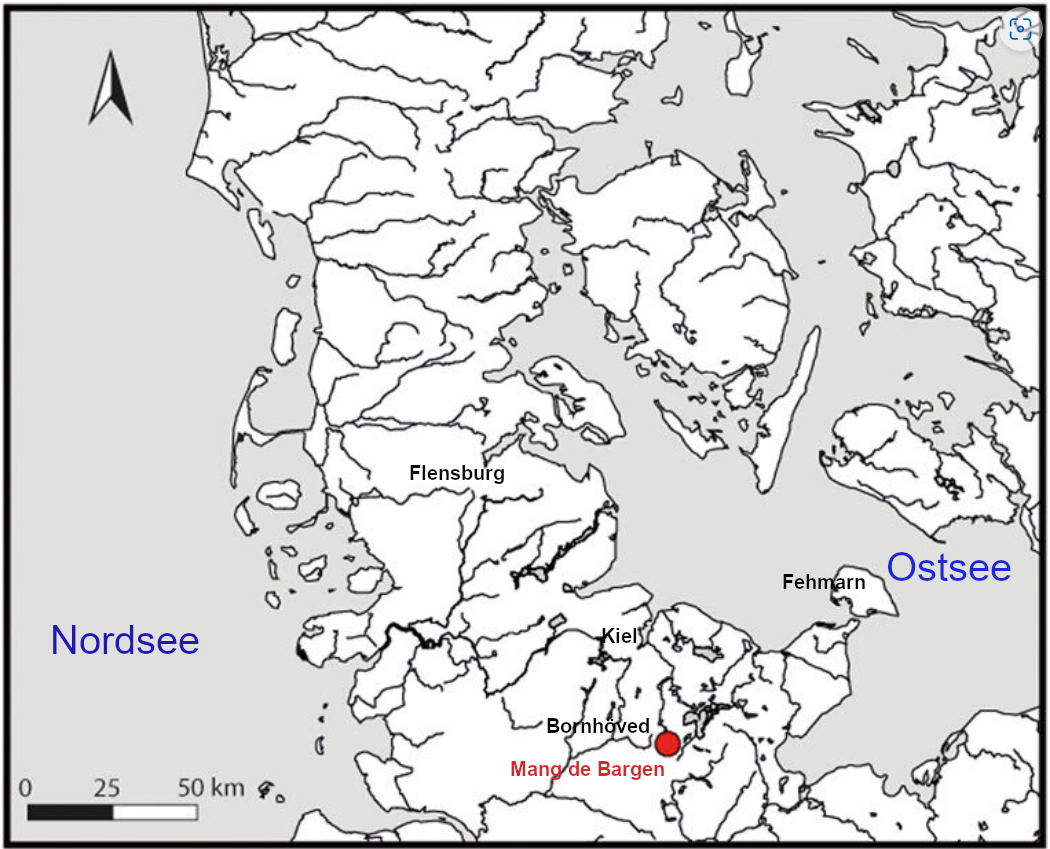
Location of the site Mang de Bargen in northern Germany

Mang de Bargen is a Bronze Age burial site located in the municipality of Bornhöved, in the Segeberg district of Schleswig-Holstein, Germany. The site is part of a larger group of burial mounds that were used repeatedly between approximately 2200 and 60 BCE.

== Archaeological investigations ==
Mang de Bargen has been the subject of extensive archaeological research since 1976, conducted in multiple phases. These studies have included the excavation of burial mounds and ecological analyses of surrounding soils and sediment layers. Since 2016, the site has been a focus of the Collaborative Research Center 1266 (CRC 1266) at Kiel University, which integrates ecological and archaeological data to investigate societal and cultural transformations during the Bronze Age.

Research at Mang de Bargen includes archaeobotanical and palaeobotanical analyses that provide insights into agricultural practices and environmental changes in the region during the (Nordic) Bronze Age. Notable findings include a field of cooking stone pits contemporaneous with the burial mounds, dating to around 1400–1100 BCE.

== Burials ==
The burial site consists of numerous mounds used from the Late Neolithic to the Early Iron Age. Initial excavations in 1976 identified 23 burial mounds, although subsequent assessments recorded only 20, as some had been significantly damaged or destroyed. Of these, 11 preserved discernible burial features, such as stone settings. The burial mounds often exhibited multiple phases of use, with more complex structures, such as stone frames or parallel stone rows, being characteristic of the Late Neolithic. During the developed Early Bronze Age (ca. 1500–1300 BCE), these structures became less elaborate.

Burial practices at Mang de Bargen evolved over time. Early burials were primarily inhumations, while secondary cremations became increasingly common in later periods. Cremated remains were either deposited in urns or scattered within burial mounds, often along the edges or nearby. Grave goods varied in quantity and material, reflecting cultural changes. While Late Neolithic burials featured simple flint tools—such as a notable fishtail dagger (like the famous Hindsgavl dagger)—later burials included bronze items such as daggers, ornaments, and ceramic vessels.

== Cultural significance ==
Interdisciplinary studies at Mang de Bargen have identified six cultural transformation phases from the Late Neolithic to the Pre-Roman Iron Age, marked by shifts in burial practices, grave construction, and grave goods.

Most of the burial mounds were initially constructed during the Late Neolithic (2300–1700 BCE), with significant expansions occurring during the Early Bronze Age 1700–1100 BCE). By 1400–1300 BCE, no new mounds were built, and cremation burials began to replace inhumations. Initially, cremated remains were scattered in wooden coffins, but by 1200–1100 BCE, urn burials became standard. These changes align with the emergence of the Urnfield culture, which spread across Europe during this period.

Significant changes in grave goods occurred in the 4th century BCE, transitioning from bronze jewelry and weapons to iron-age attire components such as belt fittings, fibulae, and pins. These findings illustrate technological advancements and evolving social structures during the transition from the Bronze to the Iron Age.

== Literature ==
- Schaefer-Di Maida, S. 2022. Der Fundplatz von Mang de Bargen – Ein bronzezeitliches Gräberfeld in Schleswig-Holstein. In: Archäologie in Schleswig, 19, 97–122.
- Schaefer-Di Maida, S. 2022. Current Research on Bronze Age ‘Cooking Stone Pits’ in Northern Germany and Southern Scandinavia. European Journal of Archaeology 25(4):463-482. doi:10.1017/eaa.2022.19.
- Stefanie Schaefer-Di Maida: Unter Hügeln. Bronzezeitliche Transformationsprozesse in Schleswig-Holstein am Beispiel des Fundplatzes von Mang de Bargen (Bornhöved, Kr. Segeberg). Sidestone Press, Leiden 2024.
- Kneisel, J., Schaefer-Di Maida, S., Dreibrodt, S., Filipovic, D., 2020. Mang de Bargen – Bornhöved Bronzezeitliche Gräberlandschaft und eine ungewöhnliche Hügelkonstruktion. Archäologische Nachrichten aus Schleswig-Holstein, 92–93.
- Kneisel, J., Dörfler, W., Dreibrodt, S., Schaefer-Di Maida, S., & Feeser, I. (2019). Cultural change and population dynamics during the Bronze Age: Integrating archaeological and palaeoenvironmental evidence for Schleswig-Holstein, Northern Germany. The Holocene, 29(10), 1607–1621. https://doi.org/10.1177/0959683619857237

== Links ==
https://www.allesbleibtanders.com/en/modules/illumination/
