= One hundred lei =

- Country: Romania
- Value: 100 Romanian leu
- Width: 147 mm
- Height: 82 mm
- Security features: watermark, security thread, transparent window, microprinting, blacklight printing, micro perforations, latent writing, EURion constellation
- Material used: polymer
- Years of printing: since 2005

Obverse
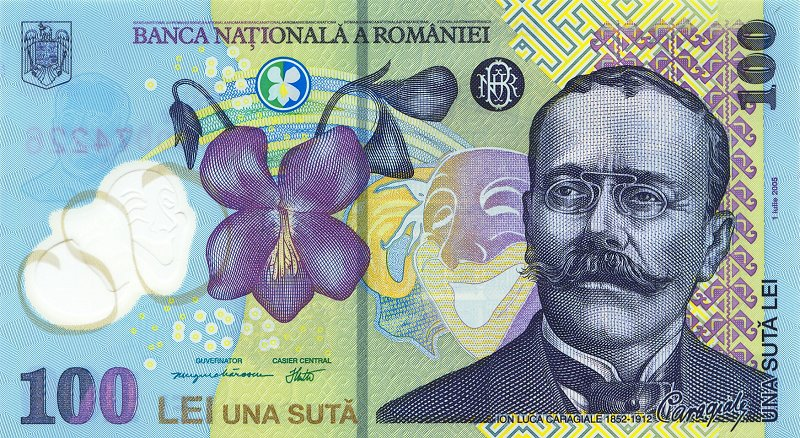
- Design: Ion Luca Caragiale, Sweet violet, mask of Comedy
- Designer: National Bank of Romania
- Design date: 2005

Reverse
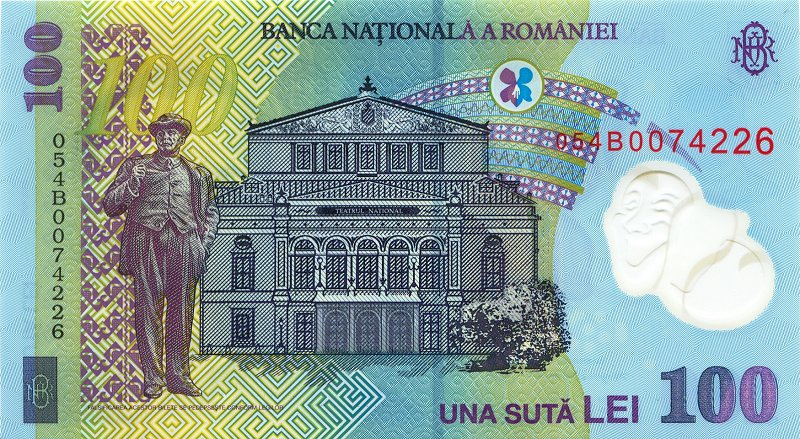
- Design: Old building of the National Theatre of Bucharest, statue of Caragiale, mask of Tragedy
- Designer: National Bank of Romania
- Design date: 2005

The one hundred lei banknote is one of the circulating denomination of the Romanian leu. It is the same size as the 2002 series of the 100 euro banknote.

The main color of the banknote is blue. It pictures, on the obverse the playwright, short story writer, poet, theater manager, political commentator and journalist Ion Luca Caragiale, and on the reverse the old building of the Bucharest National Theatre, and the statue of Ion Luca Caragiale. The one hundred lei banknote is the only banknote that pictures a personality both on the obverse and reverse.

== History ==
In the past, the denomination was also in the coin form, as follows:

First leu (1867-1947)

- banknote issues: 1877 (the hypothecary issue), 1881 (re-issues: 1881, 1882, 1883, 1884, 1885, 1886, 1888, 1889, 1890, 1891, 1892, 1893, 1894, 1896, 1897, 1898, 1899, 1900, 1902, 1904, 1905, 1906, 1907), 1910 (re-issues: 1911, 1912, 1913, 1914, 1915, 1916, 1917, 1919, 1920, 1921, 1922, 1923, 1924, 1925, 1926, 1927, 1928, 1929, 1930, 1931, 1932, 1940, 1942), 1917 (issued by the Romanian General Bank and circulated in the German occupation area between 1917-1918)
- coin issues (anniversary editions): 1906 (gold), 1922 (gold)
- coin issues: 1932, 1936 (re-issue: 1938), 1943 (re-issue: 1944)
- banknote issues: 1944 (issued by the Red Army Comandament and circulated in 1944), 1945

Second leu (1947-1952)

- banknote issue: 1947 (re-issue: December 1947)

Third leu - ROL (1952-2005)

- banknote issues: 1952, 1966
- coin issue: 1991 (re-issues: 1992, 1993, 1994, 1995, 1996)

Fourth leu - RON (since 2005)

- banknote issue: 2005 (redesigned issue of the former 1.000.000 lei banknote, whereas 1.000.000 third lei = 100 fourth lei)

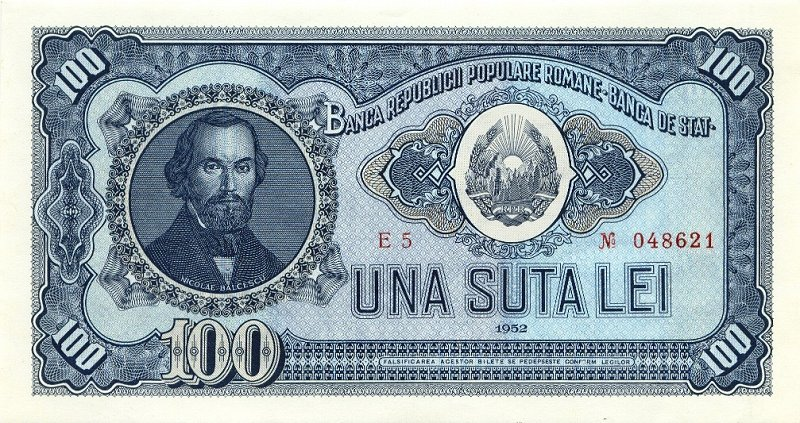
Obverse

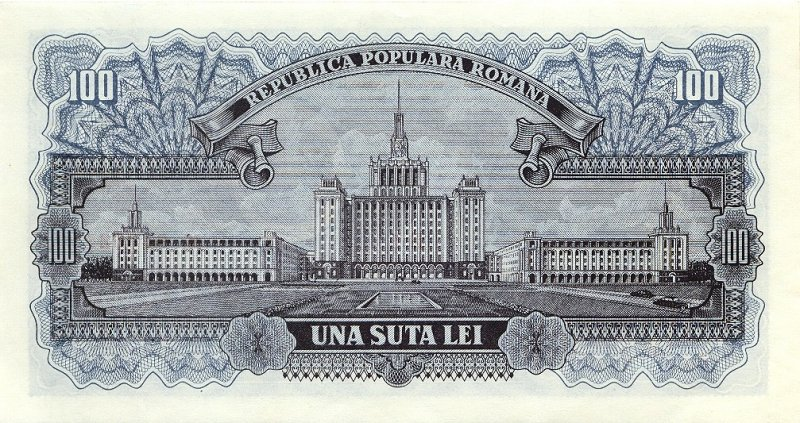
Reverse

1952 100 lei issue

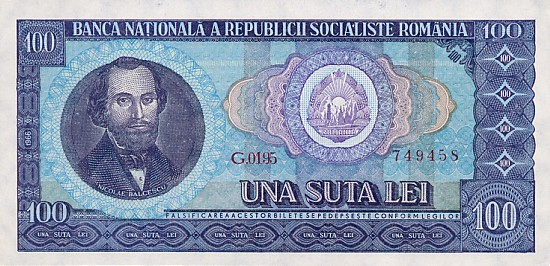
Obverse

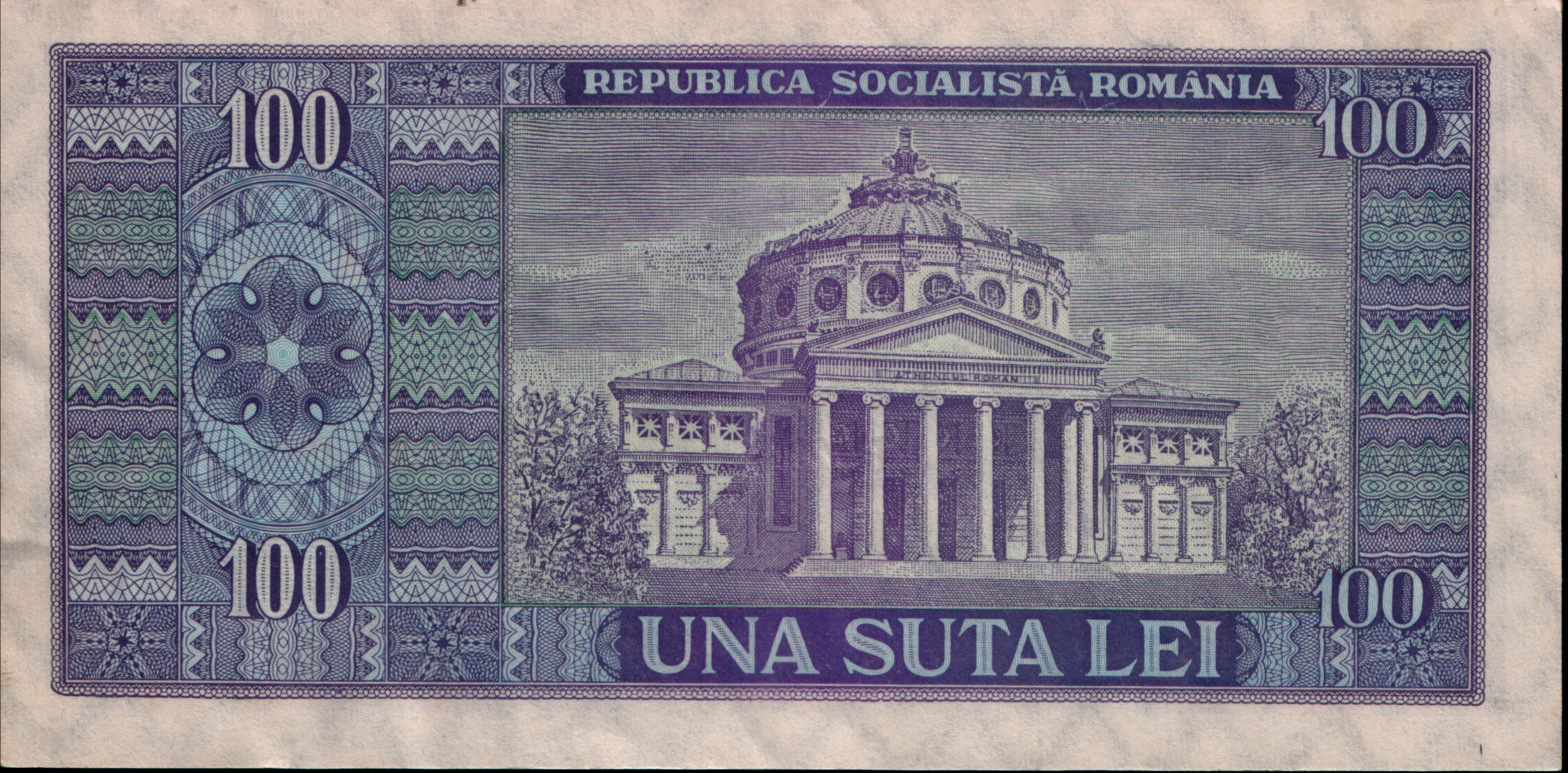
Reverse

1966 100 lei issue
