= Banknotes of Denmark, 2009 series =

The 2009 series of Danish banknotes commenced in August 2009 and replaced the 1997 series. The theme of the notes is bridges of Denmark and ancient Danish artifacts found in the vicinity of the bridges. Danish artist Karin Birgitte Lund was selected to design the 2009 series after a competition. The competition specified the bridges theme as mandatory, and it was her idea to include the artifacts on the reverse side.

The sizes of the 2009 banknotes are identical to the 1997 banknotes, in order to avoid alterations to automated teller machines. The height is 72 millimetres, and the lengths are from 125 mm to 165 mm, increasing by 10 mm for each new value.

The Danish central bank gradually upgraded the 2009 series to make it more secure against counterfeiting. The upgraded banknotes constitute the 2009A series. The 1000-krone banknote was not upgraded, as it was phased out, along with all banknotes made before the 2009 series, on 31 May 2025.

== 50-krone banknote ==

The 50-krone banknote was issued on 11 August 2009. It features the Sallingsund Bridge and the Skarpsalling Vessel dating from around 3200 BC. This denomination features the word "halvtreds" (English: fifty) instead of "femti," which was used on the previous series 50 DKK notes; "femti" (lit. 'five tens') was usually used for reasons of convenience written on cheques.

== 100-krone banknote ==

The 100-krone banknote was issued on 4 May 2010. It features the Old Little Belt Bridge and the Hindsgavl Dagger dating from 1900 to 1700 BC.

== 200-krone banknote ==

The 200-krone banknote was issued on 19 October 2010. It features the Knippelsbro and the Langstrup Belt Plate from the early Bronze Age, approximately 1400 BC.

== 500-krone banknote ==

The 500-krone banknote was issued on 15 February 2011. It features the Queen Alexandrine Bridge and the Keldby Vessel from the 4th or early 3rd century BC. The banknote was upgraded in 2020.

== 1000-krone banknote ==

The 1000-krone banknote was issued on 24 May 2011. It features the Great Belt Bridge and the Trundholm Sun Chariot from the early Bronze Age, approximately 1400 BC. The 1000-krone was taken out of circulation on 31 May 2025, and is no longer legal tender.
