= Hindsgavl Dagger =

Danish flint dagger from ~1800 BCE

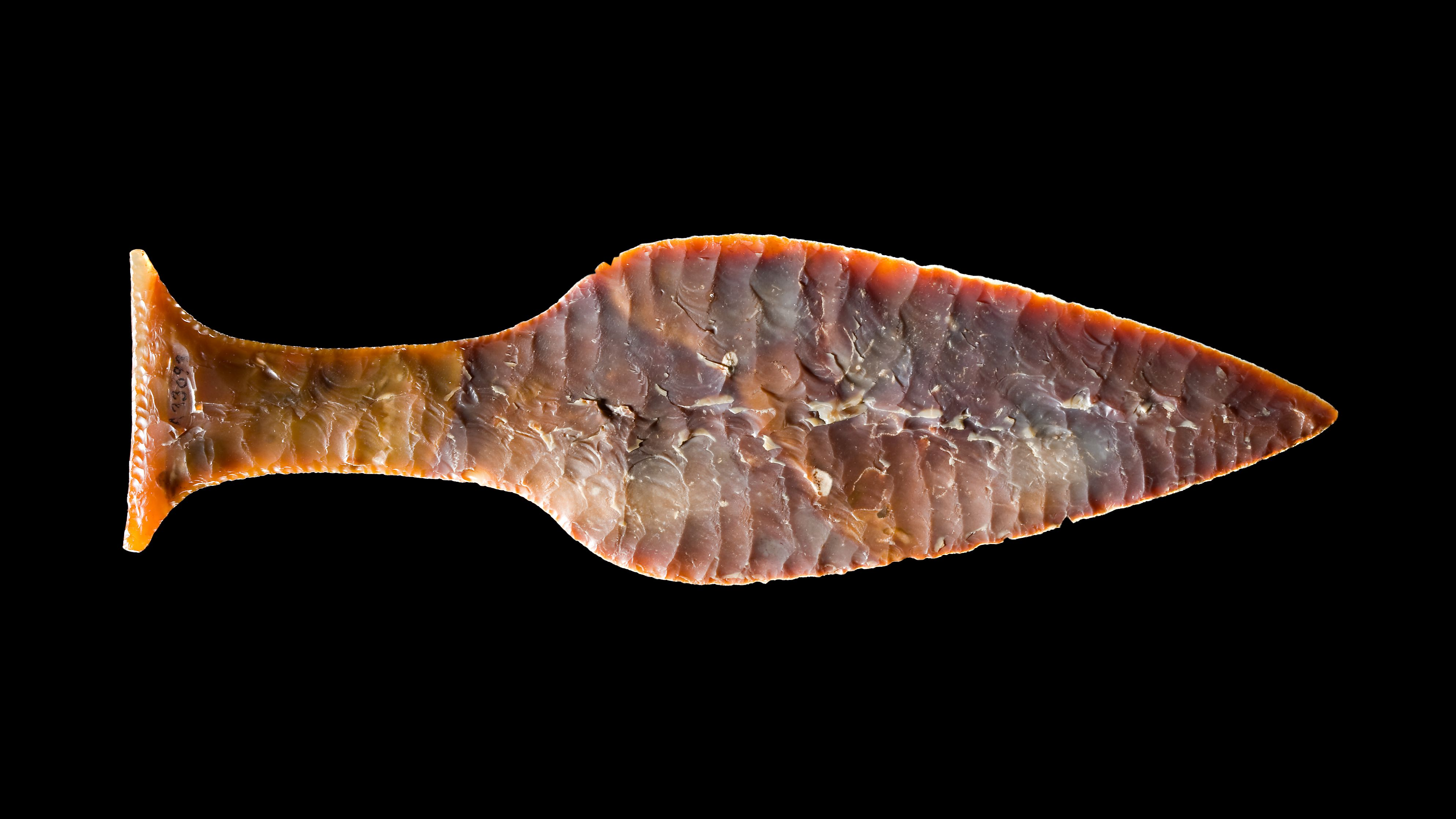
- Material: Flint
- Created: c. 1900-1800 BC
- Discovered: 1867; Fænø
- Present location: National Museum of Denmark

The Hindsgavl Dagger (Danish: Hindsgavldolken), found in 1886 on the Danish island of Fænø, then owned by Hindsgavl Manor on Funen, hence the name, is one of the finest examples of a so-called fishtail flint dagger from the end of the Nordic Stone Age. It is now in the collection of the National Museum of Denmark. It is featured on the current Danish 100-krone banknote.

== History ==
The dagger was discovered in 1867 by a little boy in a field on the island of Fænø, then part of the Hindsgavl Manor. When he saw it, he shouted to his mother, "look, mum, what a beautiful stone!". The estate manager, who was standing nearby, bought the dagger from the boy for a daler and gifted it to the owner of the estate. In 1889, when Paris was both hosting the Exposition Universelle and an archeological congress, Denmark contributed to an exhibition of archeological artefacts. However, since the National Museum of Denmark under Danish law was not allowed to loan out its objects, Denmark could only send copies and artefacts from private collections. The owner of Hindsgavl Manor, Basse Fønss, agreed to loan out the Hindsgavl Dagger. Sophus Müller, director of the National Museum, was so impressed with it that he convinced Fønss to deposit it in the museum on a permanent basis. After Fønss's death in 1922, the museum purchased it from his heirs.

== Description ==
The Hindsgavl Dagger was made of flint in around 1900–1800 BC. It is 29.5 cm (11.6 in) long and has a blade thickness of less than 1 cm (0.39 in). It is an example of a so-called fishtail dagger, named for the shape of the handle. The design was inspired by imported bronze daggers, which had already started to appear on the Scandinavian market. Production of flint daggers continued well into the Nordic Bronze Age.

== 2009 series 100-krone banknote ==
The Hindsgavl Dagger is featured on the 100-krone banknote on the 2009 series banknotes of Denmark .

== Gallery ==
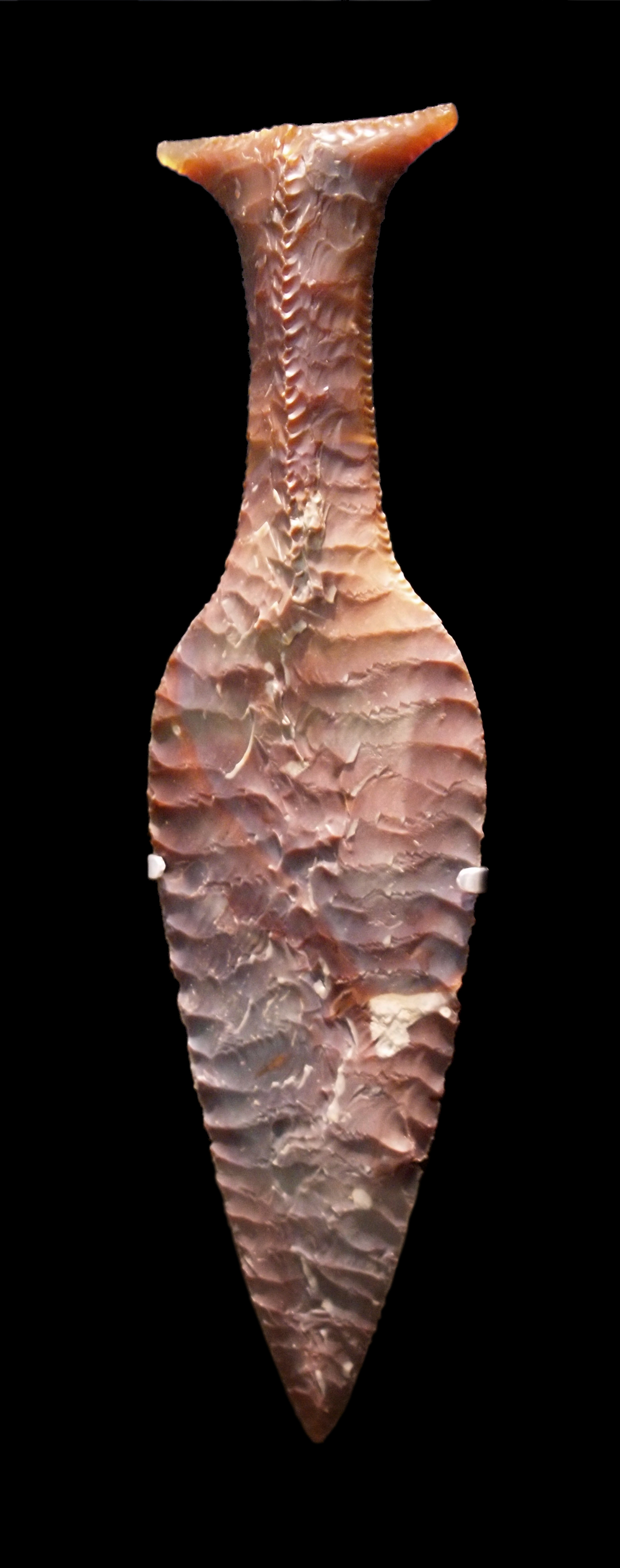

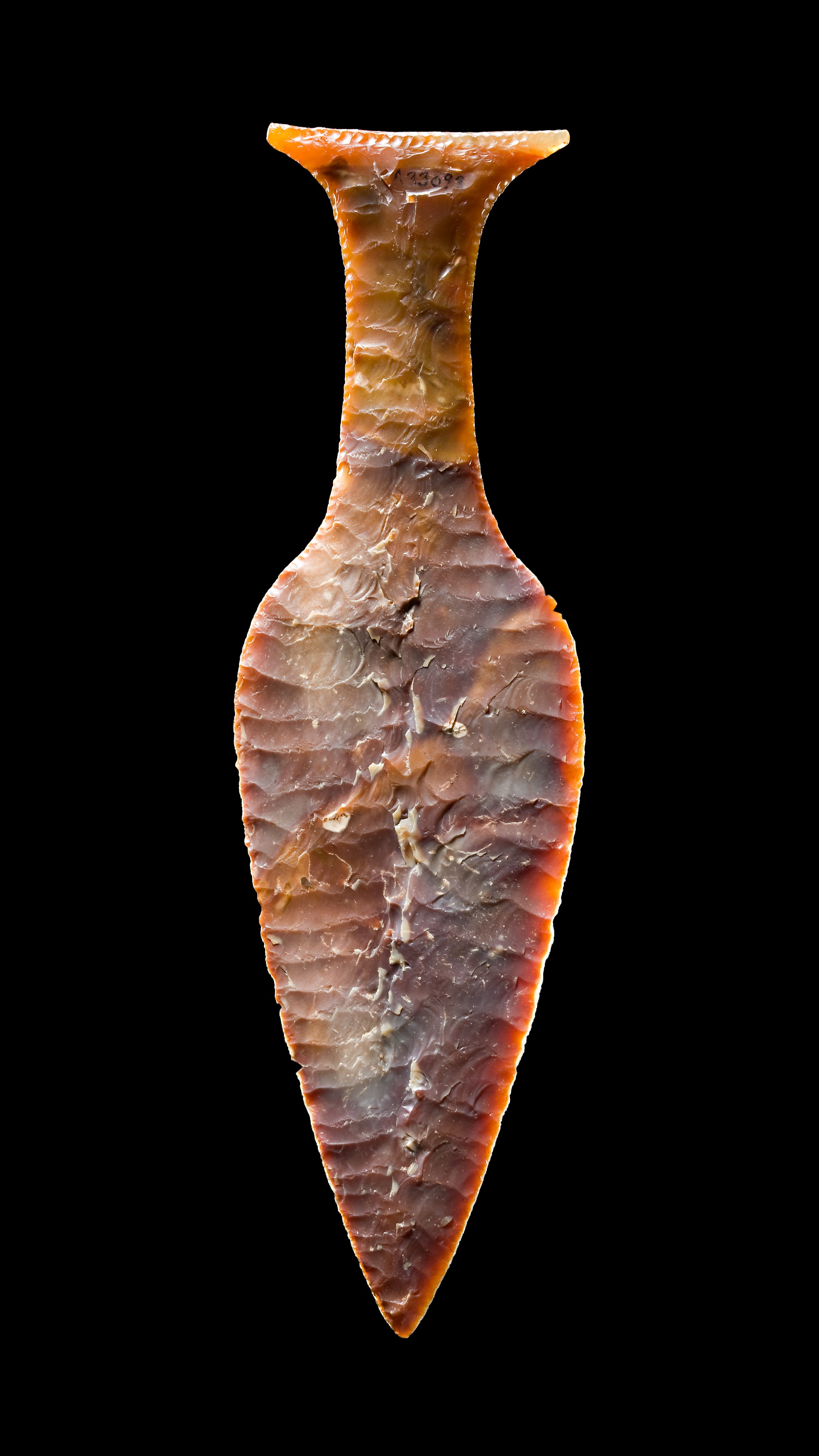

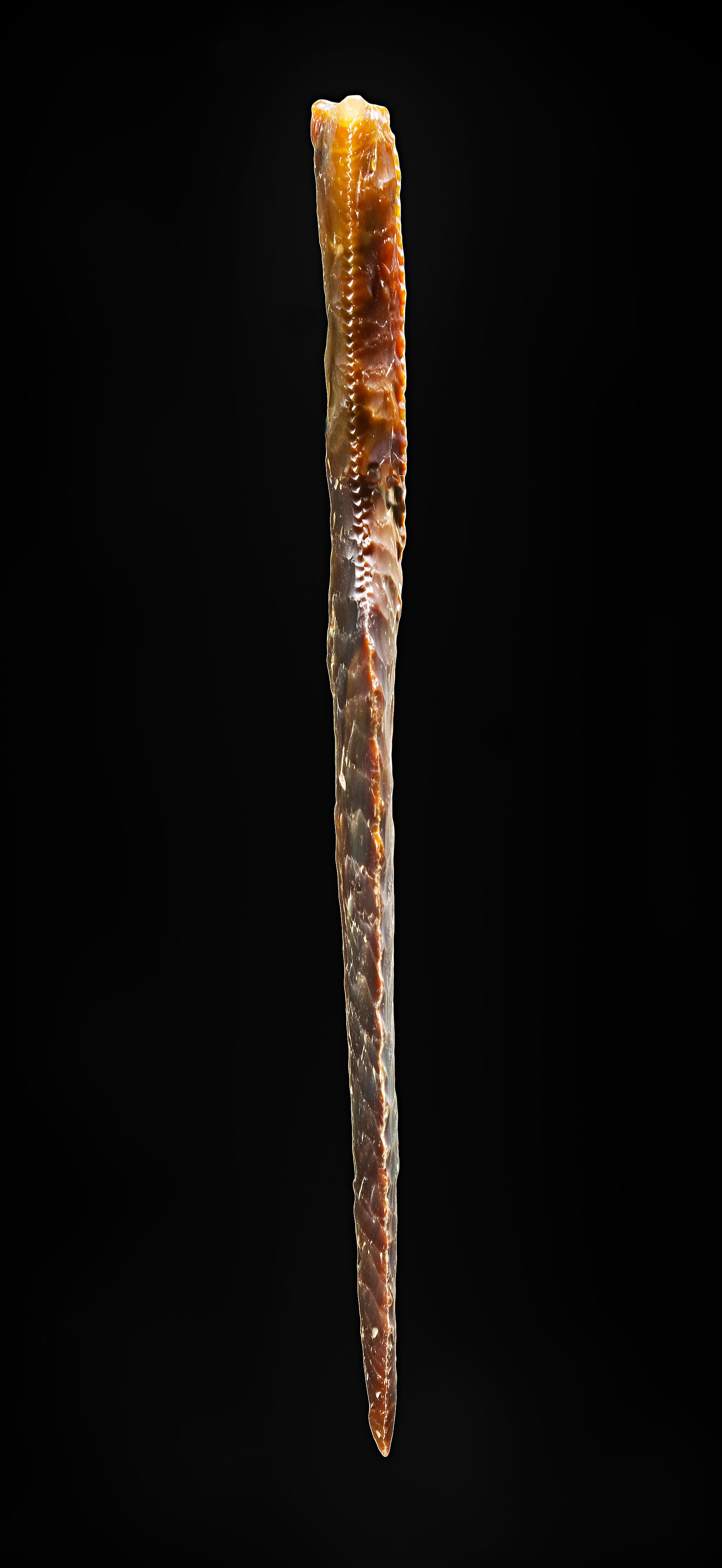
Side view

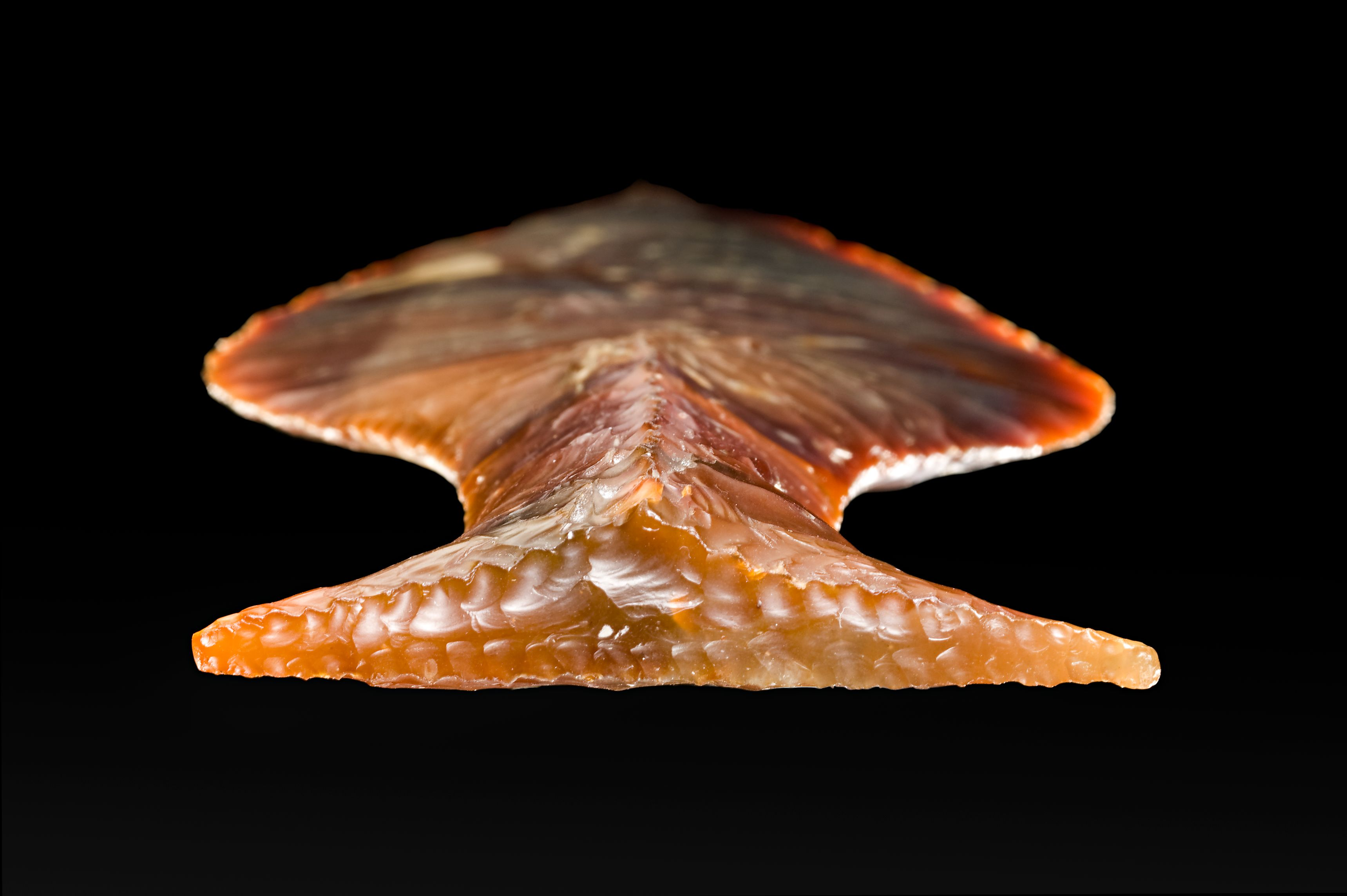
