= Statue of Ion Luca Caragiale (Bucharest) =

Statue in central Bucharest, Romania

Coordinates: 44°26′30.70″N 26°6′22.48″E

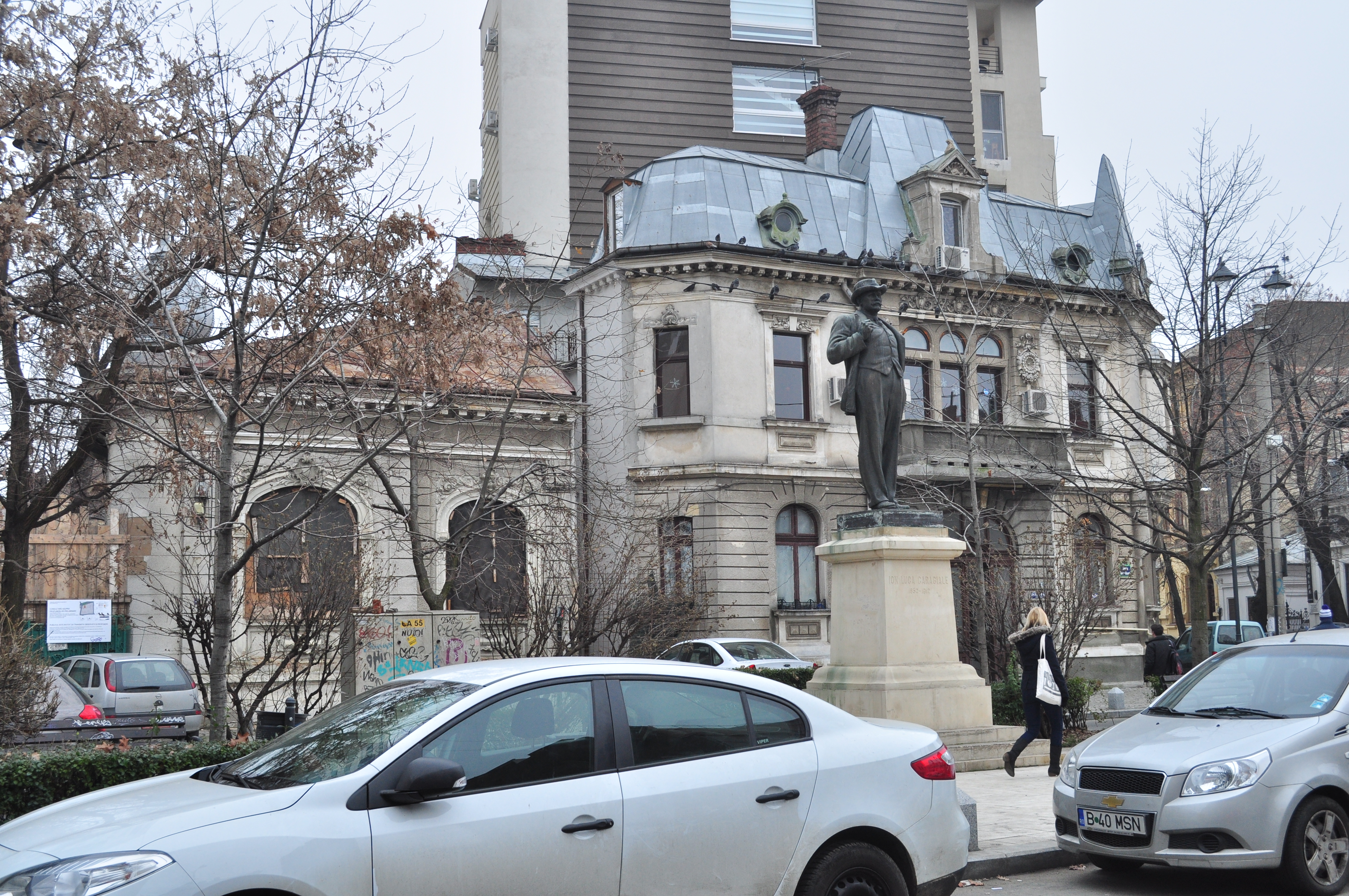
The statue, on Maria Rosetti Street, 2014

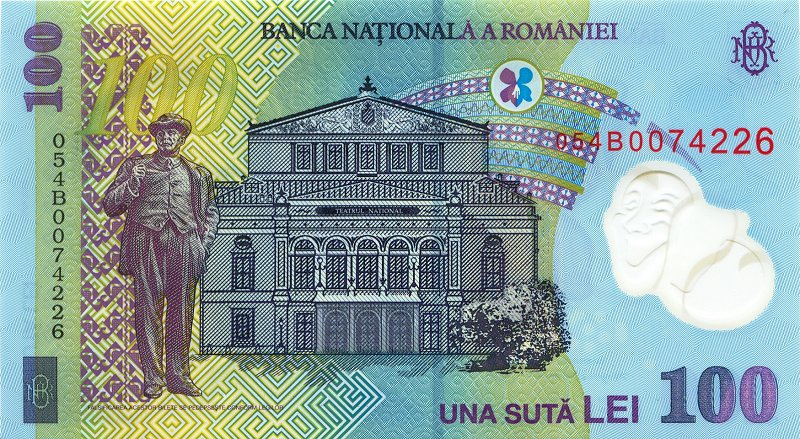
The statue, featured on the 100 lei banknote

A statue of Ion Luca Caragiale, sculpted by Constantin Baraschi, is located on Maria Rosetti Street in central Bucharest, Romania. It is placed in front of the house where the dramatist and short story writer Ion Luca Caragiale once lived.

In 1957, Baraschi took part in the contest for the statue of Soviet leader Vladimir Lenin, which Communist authorities meant to place in front of the Casa Scînteii, a newly built Socialist Realist structure in northern Bucharest. His bronze sculpture lost the contest to the one designed by Boris Caragea, so Baraschi decided to replace the head of Lenin's statue with that of Caragiale. He was once again refused, because this statue could have been seen as mocking Lenin. However, the statue was bought by the state and, after years of being kept in a courtyard in the Splaiul Independenței area, it was moved to the Cartea Românească Publishing House courtyard from General Berthelot Street, perhaps at the intervention of influential novelist Marin Preda.

In 1998, nine years after the 1989 Revolution, the Cartea Românească building was returned to its rightful owner; the Ministry of Culture had to take the statue into its patrimony, and subsequently moved it in front of a house where Caragiale lived once, on Maria Rosetti Street. In 2002, Dinu Săraru, chairman of the National Theatre Bucharest, oversaw the statue's move to a new location on University Square, in front of the Theatre's building. After Săraru resigned from office, on 11 February 2006, it was moved back to Maria Rosetti Street, because the move had not been approved and, as such, was technically illegal. A statue of the major Romanian actor Grigore Vasiliu Birlic, is planned to take its place in University Square.

The statue is featured in the foreground of the reverse of the 100 lei banknote, at its old location in front of the old building of the Bucharest National Theatre.
