= List of rivers of Denmark =

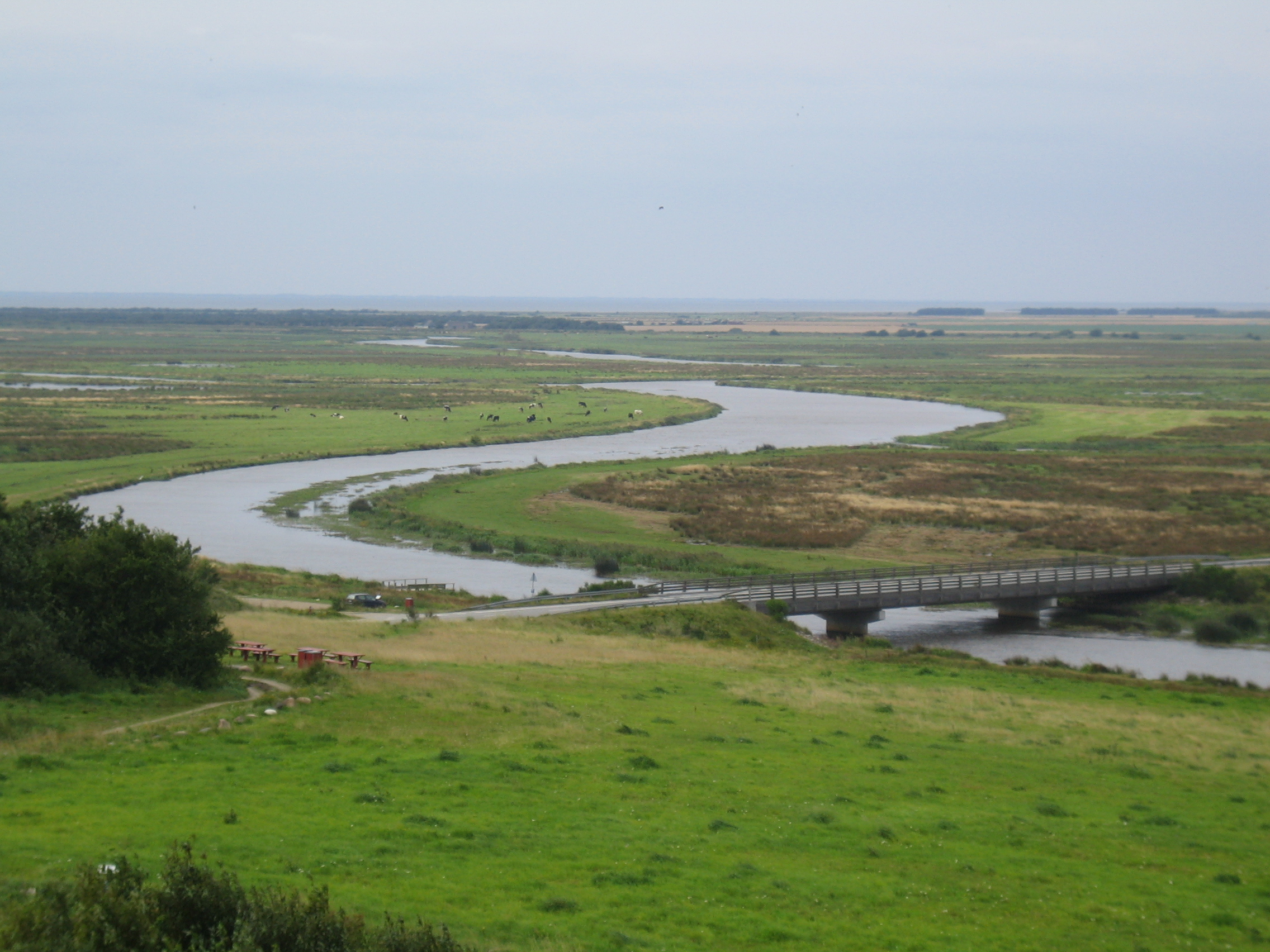
Skjern Å, the largest river in Denmark by water volume

Denmark has approximately 900 streams with outlet to the sea. Almost half are less than 5 kilometres (3.1 mi) long. 52 of them are over 25 kilometres (16 mi) long and 17 are over 50 kilometres (31 mi) long.

The longest river is Gudenå with 156.3 kilometres (97.1 mi) while Skjern Å has the largest discharge at the mouth with on average 30 cubic metres per second (1,100 cu ft/s).

The rivers longer than 50 kilometres (31 mi) are:

The longest rivers in Denmark measured from source to outlet in the sea incl. stretches through lakes.
Number	Stream	Length		Included lakes	Measured through the tributaries	Located on
Number	Stream	km	mi	Included lakes	Measured through the tributaries	Located on
1	Gudenå	156.3	97.1	Bredvad Sø, Mossø, Gudensø, Ry Mølle Sø, Lillesø, Birksø, Julsø, Borre Sø, Brassø, Langsø, Sminge Sø, Tange Sø		Jutland
2	Skjern Å	104.1	64.7	Rørbæk Sø, Nedersø, Kulsø, Hastrup Sø, MES		Jutland
3	Storå	101.7	63.2	Holstebro Vandkraftsø		Jutland
4	Karup Å	92.8	57.7		Skygge Å/Elbæk	Jutland
5	Varde Å	90.5	56.2		Grindsted Å/Vandel Bæk	Jutland
6	Suså	86.5	53.7	Tystrup/Bavelse Sø		Zealand
7	Odense Å	81.8	50.8		Hågerup Å (29.7 km (18.5 mi))	Funen
8	Vidå	80.2	49.8		Sønderå/Bjerndrup Mølleå	Jutland
9	Ribe Å	76.5	47.5		Gram Å/Nørreå/Fovs Å	Jutland
10	Halleby Å	65.5	40.7	Tissø	Tysinge Å	Zealand
11	Rye Å	64.2	39.9		Hellum Bæk	Jutland
12	Kongeå	63.6	39.5		(72.3 km (44.9 mi) if measured via Gesten Å)	Jutland
13	Uggerby Å	60.6	37.7		Møllebæk	Jutland
14	Brede Å	54.4	33.8		Fiskbæk	Jutland
15	Skals Å	54.1	33.6		Kousted Å	Jutland
16	Simested Å	51.4	31.9			Jutland
17	Lindenborg Å	50.2	31.2			Jutland
