= List of lakes of Denmark =

This list of lakes of Denmark includes the largest lakes in Denmark

== Largest lakes by area ==
Lakes of Denmark by area
Rank	Lake	Area (km^{2})
1.	Arresø	39.5
2.	Esrum Sø	17.4
3.	Stadil Fjord	17.3
4.	Mossø	16.6
5.	Saltbæk Vig	16.1
6.	Tissø	12.7
7.	Furesø	9.3
8.	Skanderborg sø	8.6
9.	Søndersø	8.4
10.	Tystrup Sø	6.7
11.	Tømmerby Fjord	6.0
12.	Vejlen/Ulvedyb	5.9
13.	Julsø	5.8
14.	Tange Sø	5.5
15.	Lund Fjord	5.1

== Lakes larger than 5 hectares ==
Denmark has approximately 120,000 lakes and ponds with an area of at least 0.1 hectares (1000 m^{2}). Of these, 1,032 lakes have an official name.

=== A ===
- Arresø
- Arreskov Lake

=== B ===
- Bagsværd Sø
- Barup Sø
- Bastrup Sø
- Bechers Sø
- Brokholm Sø
- Buresø
- Bølling Sø

=== D ===
- Damhus Sø
- Donssøerne
- Dybesø

=== E ===
- Emdrup Lake
- Esrum Sø

=== F ===
- Farum Sø
- Ferring Sø
- Filsø
- Fuglsang Sø
- Furesø
- Fussing Sø
- Fårup Sø

=== G ===
- Gentofte Lake
- Gribsø
- Grynderup Sø
- Gråsten Slotssø
- Gurre Sø
- Gødstrup Sø

=== H ===
- Haderslev Dam
- Hald Sø
- Hampen Sø
- Hejrede Sø
- Hinge Sø
- Horn Sø
- Hovedsø
- Hunesø

=== J ===
- Jystrup Sø

=== K ===
- Karlsgårde Sø
- Kilen
- Klejtrup Sø

=== L ===
- Legind Sø
- Louns Sø
- Lund Fjord
- Lyngby Sø

=== M ===
- Madum
- Maribosøerne

=== N ===
- Nordborg Sø
- Nors Sø
- Nørresø (Maribosøerne)
- Nørresø (Viborg)

=== O ===
- Oldenor

=== R ===
- Ring Sø
- Røgbølle Sø
- Rørbæk Sø

=== S ===
- Sjælsø
- Sjørring Sø
- Slivsø
- Solbjerg Engsø
- Stadil Fjord
- Store Grankule
- Store Kattinge Sø
- Stubbe Sø
- Sunds Sø
- Søby Sø
- Søbygård Sø
- Søerne
- Sønder Lem Vig
- Søndersø (Maribosøerne)
- Søndersø (Nordsjælland)
- Søndersø (Viborg)

=== T ===
- Teglgård Sø
- Tissø
- Tjele Langsø
- Tofte Sø
- Tuelsø
- Tversted-søerne
- Tystrup Sø

=== U ===
- Uglesø

=== V ===
- Vandet Sø
- Vandkraftsøen
- Vedsø
- Vejlesø
- Vessø
- Viborgsøerne
- Vilsted Sø

== See also ==
- List of forests in Denmark
- List of rivers of Denmark
