= Sagaholm =

Bronze age burial site in Sweden

Coordinates: 57.4447°N 14.1020°E

Sagaholm is the site of Bronze Age burial mounds (Sagaholmshögen). Sagaholm is located in Ljungarums parish just south of Jönköping in Småland, Sweden.

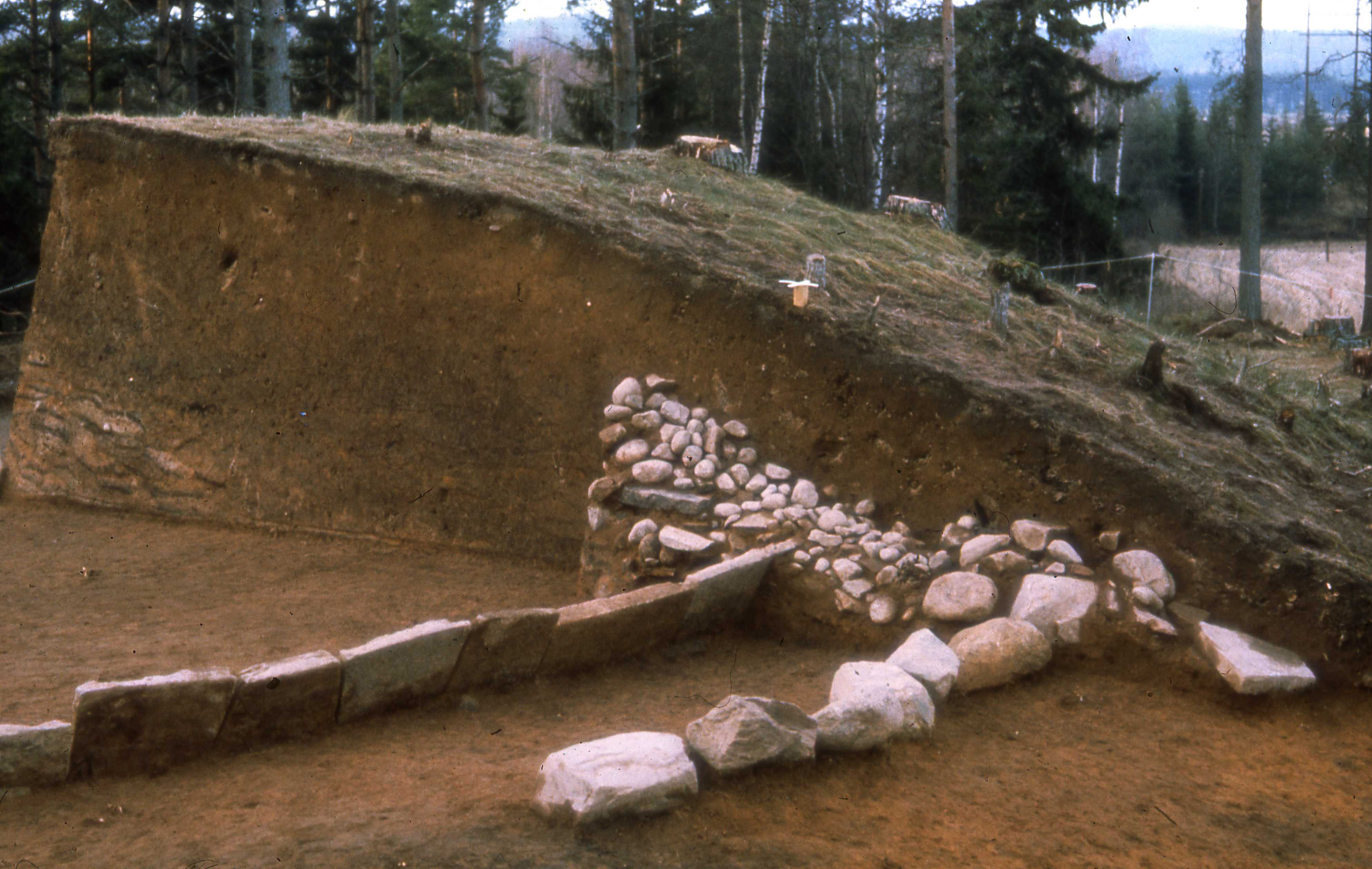
Sagaholmshögen)

== Sagaholmshögen ==
Sagaholmshögen is a cairn dating from the early Nordic Bronze Age (c. 1700–500 BC). The site had a large barrow with a circle of slabs of sandstone, probably numbering as many as 100. Only 45 graves remain, with 18 of them adorned with petroglyphs depicting ships, animals and people, including scenes of zoophilia. The finds are presently on display in Jönköpings County Museum (Jönköpings läns museum) in Jönköping.

== See also ==
- The King's Grave
- Trundholm sun chariot
- Skelhøj

== Sources ==
- Goldhahn, Joakim (2006) Om döda och efterlevande med exempel från Bredrör, Skelhøj, Sagaholm och Mjeltehaugen (Bergen, Norway: "Arkeologiske Skrifter". Pg 283–303) ISBN 9171914897
