= The King's Grave =

Bronze Age grave in Kivik, Sweden

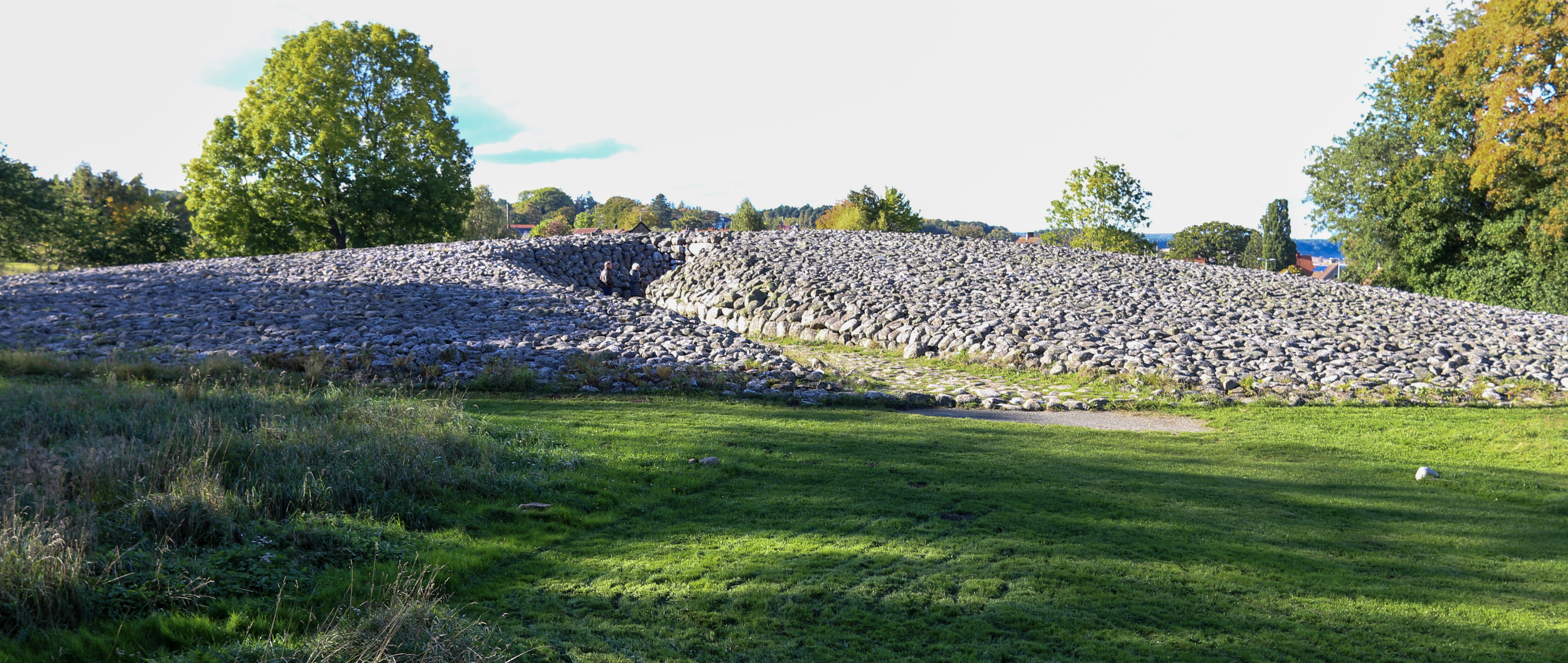
- Kiviksgrave burial site near Kivik, Sweden

- Location within Sweden
- 55°41′N 14°14′E
- Location: Scania, Sweden

The King's Grave (Kungagraven i Kivik, Kiviksgraven) is an archaeological site. It is situated near Kivik in the southeastern portion of Scania, Sweden. The site is what remains of an unusually grand Nordic Bronze Age double burial dating from circa the 15th century BC.

== Site ==
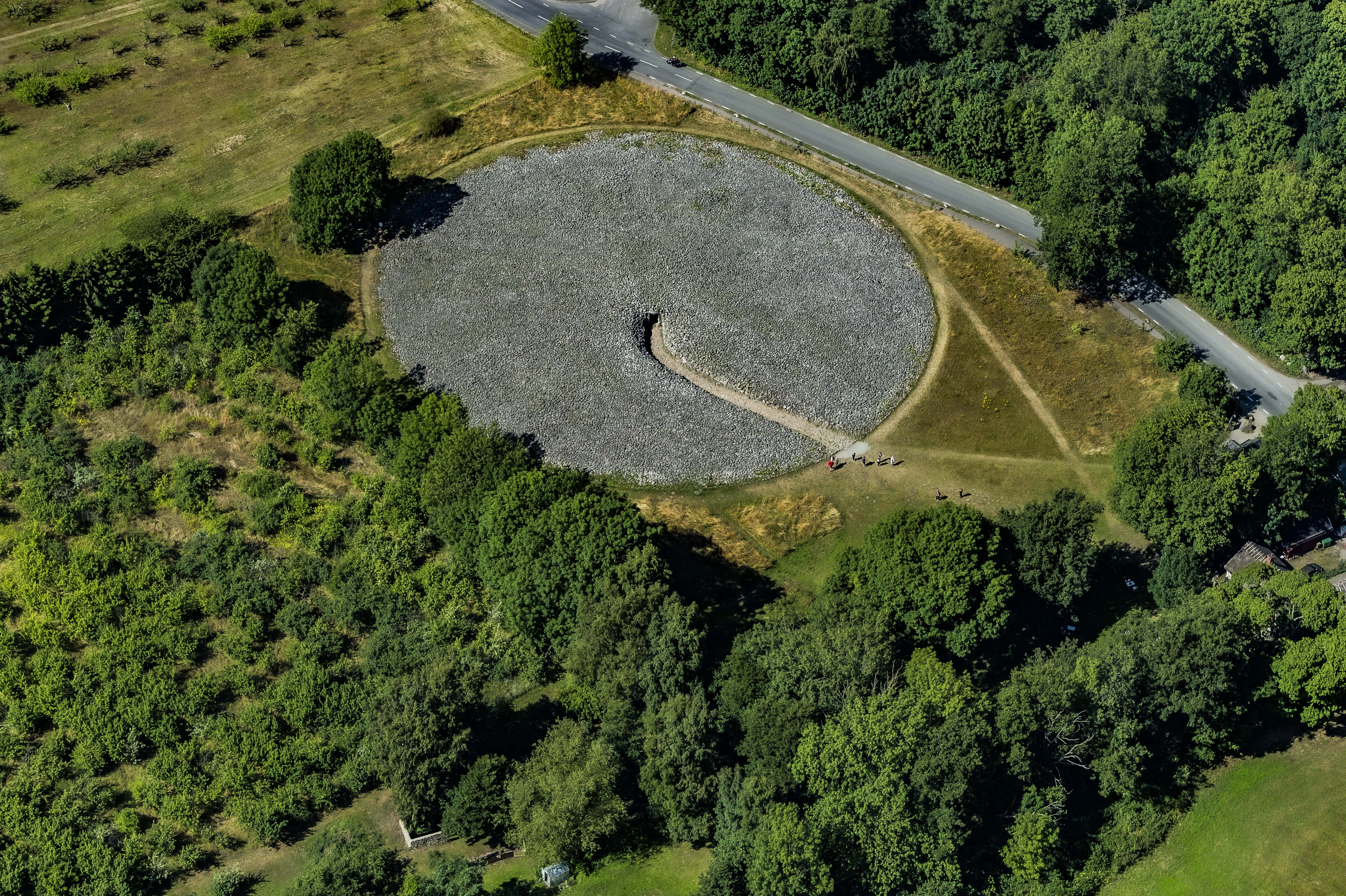
Aerial view of the King's Grave

The King's Grave lies near Kivik in southeastern Scania, Sweden. The monument is a cairn, a burial mound constructed largely from stone, and is one of the largest known burial monuments in northern Europe.

In its restored form, the circular cairn measures about 75 metres (250 ft) across and 3.5 metres (11 ft) high. Near its centre is a cist, a stone-built burial chamber approximately 4 metres (13 ft) long and 1.5 metres (4.9 ft) wide. Its decorated stone slabs form the inner sides of the chamber.

== Discovery and excavation ==
By the 18th century, the cairn was being used as a source of stone for local construction. On 14 June 1748, local farmers Lasse Pärsson and Anders Sahlberg opened the burial chamber while removing stone from the monument for field walls. They were not searching for treasure, but the discovery quickly gave rise to rumours that they had found and concealed valuables. The men were arrested and accused of withholding treasure considered the property of the Swedish state; part of the subsequent court proceedings was held at the cairn itself.

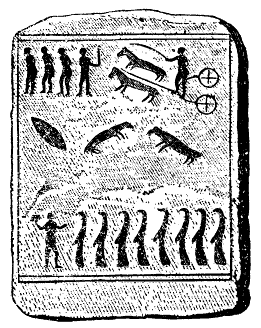
A decorated slab from the burial chamber, illustrated in the 1911 Nordisk familjebok

Pärsson and Sahlberg were released on 8 June 1749 for lack of evidence. Their testimony provides some of the earliest evidence for what the chamber contained when it was opened: they reported seeing artefacts inside, but none were preserved and they are known only from historical accounts.

The petroglyphs that would later make the monument famous initially went unnoticed. They were not mentioned during the proceedings against Pärsson and Sahlberg, and Swedish naturalist Carl Linnaeus did not record them when he passed the cairn in late May 1749. The carvings were first recognized in 1756.

Nearly two centuries after the chamber was opened, Swedish archaeologist Gustaf Hallström (1880–1962) excavated the monument in 1931. The excavation recovered human remains and fragmented bronze objects from the principal cist.

== Petroglyphs ==
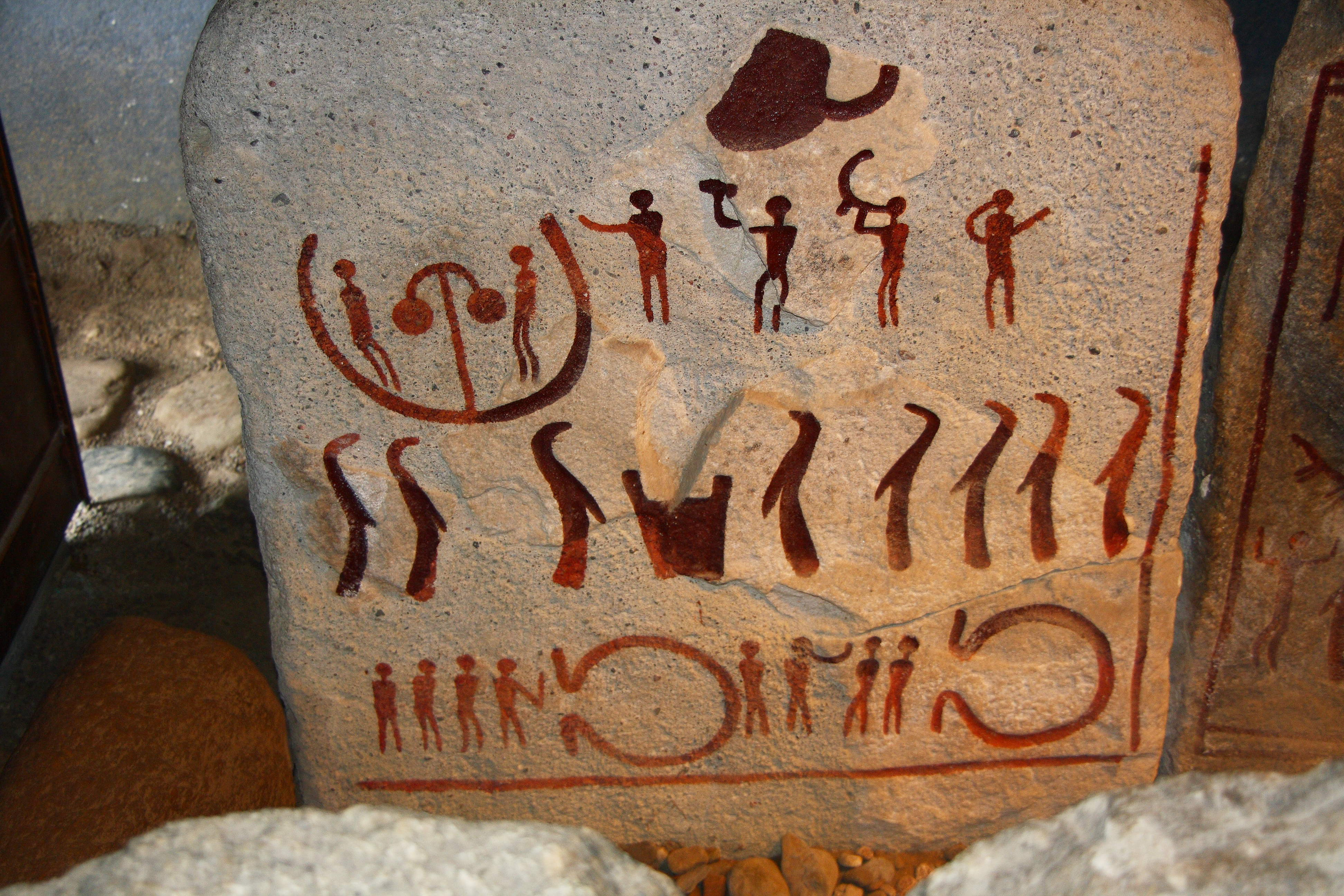
A carved slab depicting eight human figures

The principal cist is formed from ten upright stone slabs, eight of which are decorated with petroglyphs on the surfaces facing the burial chamber. The carvings were first recognised in 1756, eight years after the cist was opened during quarrying in 1748. They are among the best-known examples of Nordic Bronze Age art.

The carvings depict people, ships, birds, fish, horses, axes, circular symbols and figures playing lurs. They also include a chariot drawn by two horses and fitted with four-spoked wheels.

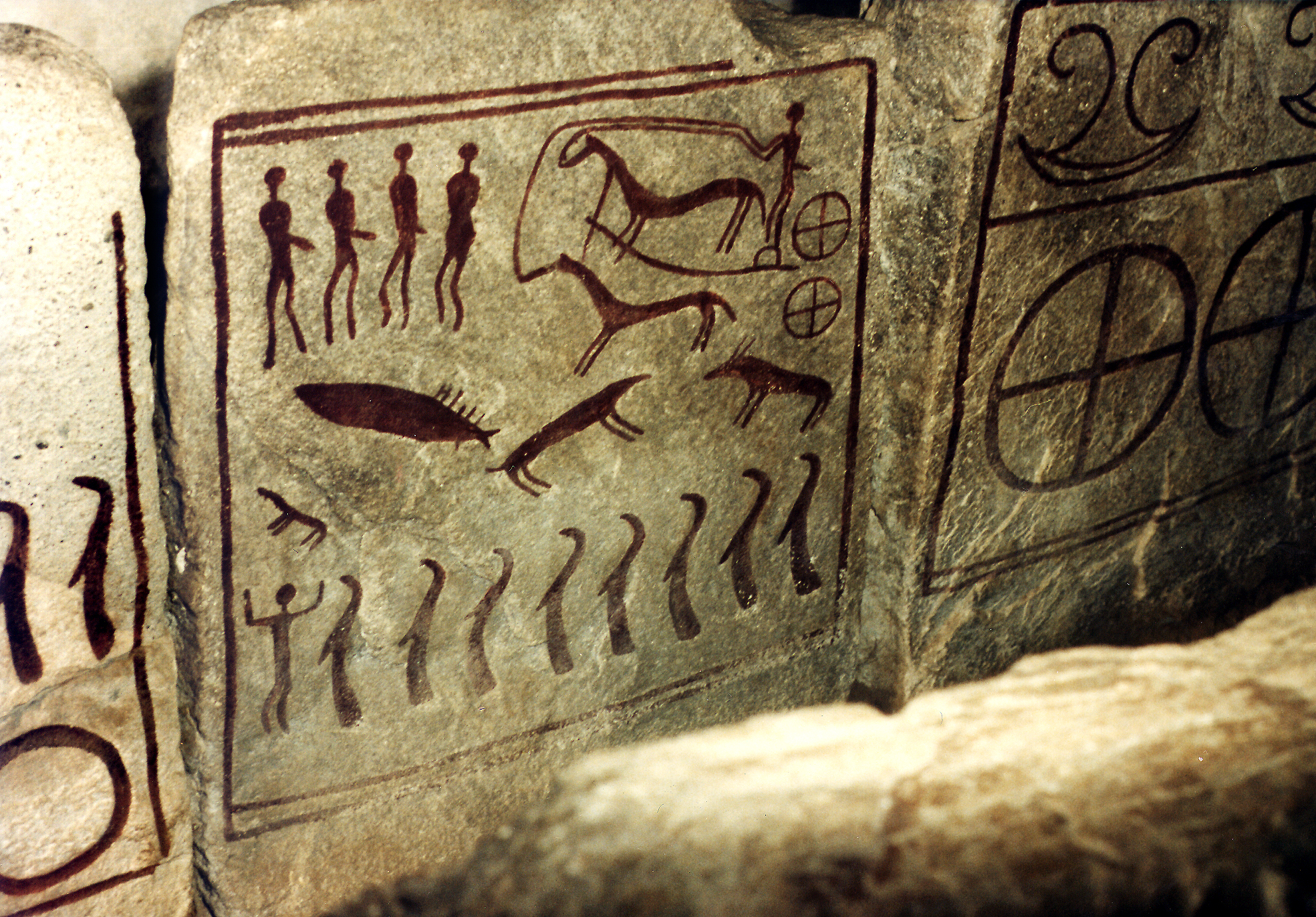
A carved slab depicting a chariot drawn by two horses

After most of the original grave goods were lost, the carved slabs became the principal focus of archaeological study. During the 19th century, Swedish zoologist and archaeologist Sven Nilsson (1787–1883) argued that the carvings reflected the presence of Phoenician settlers in Scandinavia. British archaeologist John Lubbock (1834–1913) supported Nilsson's theory in his book Pre-Historic Times (1865), suggesting that the human figures represented on the carvings "may fairly be said to have a Phoenician, or Egyptian appearance." Nilsson's interpretation was later rejected as archaeological knowledge of the monument and the Bronze Age developed.

== Human remains ==
Only a small quantity of human remains survived within the principal cist because the monument had been looted before archaeological excavation. During excavations between 1931 and 1933, Swedish archaeologist Gustaf Hallström (1880–1962) recovered several teeth and fragments of bone from the chamber.

A reanalysis of the remains by Swedish archaeologist Joakim Goldhahn found that they came from at least five people: four adolescents and one adult. Radiocarbon dating showed that the burials took place during at least three separate periods between approximately 1400 and 800 BCE. This indicates that the principal cist remained open and continued to receive burials for about 600 years.

The adult dated to the 9th century BCE, several centuries later than both the decorated stone cist and the associated bronze objects. These findings challenged the traditional interpretation of the monument as the burial place of a single Nordic Bronze Age ruler.

== Restoration ==
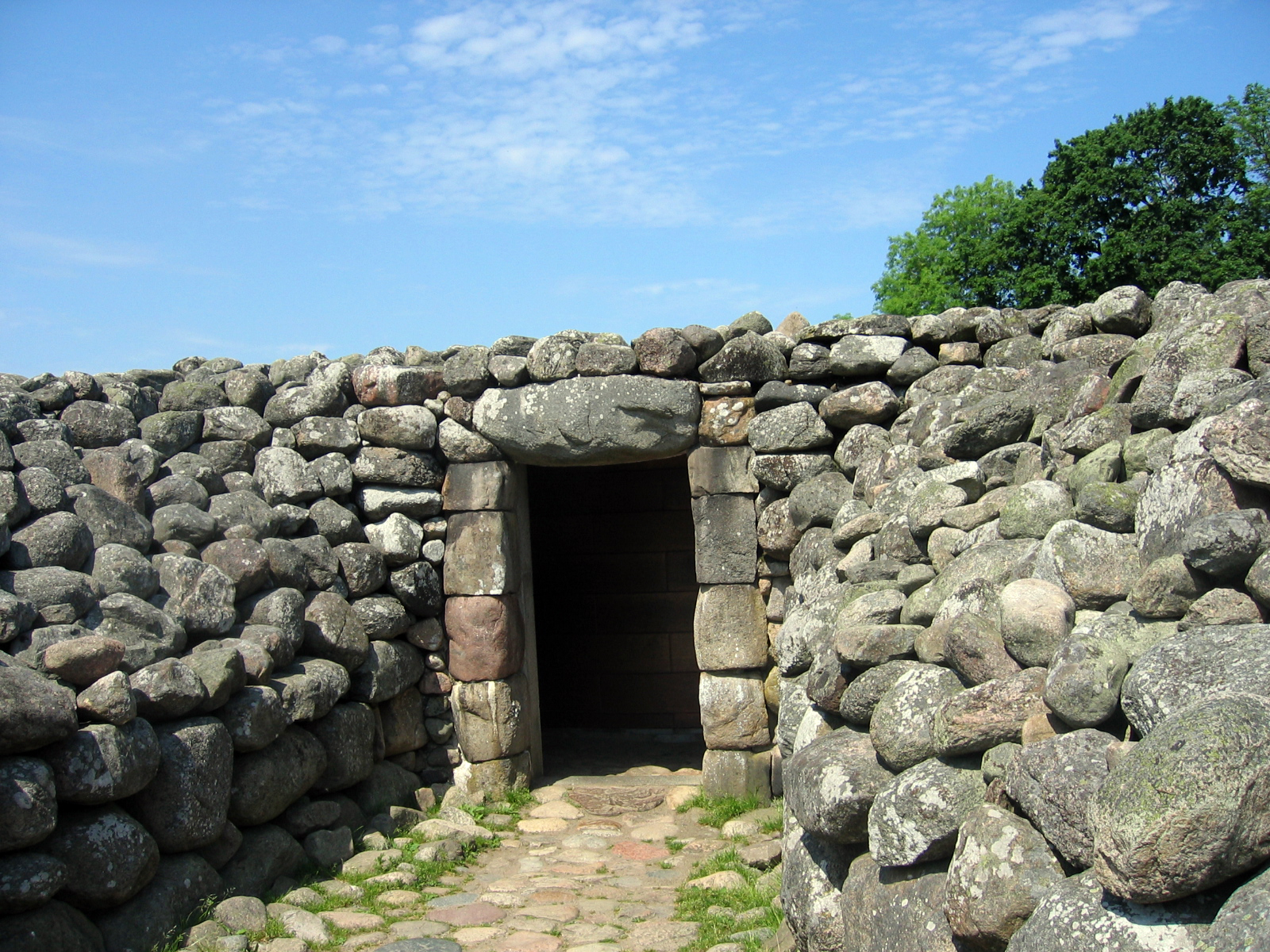
The reconstructed entrance to the King's Grave

The monument seen today is substantially reconstructed. The stone-lined burial chamber, known as a cist, had already been restored three times before Hallström excavated the site in 1931. By the time of Hallström's excavation, much of the original cairn had disappeared and the cist was protected by a concrete casing and metal roof.

Hallström's six-week excavation in 1931 was followed by a major reconstruction in 1932–1933. The work was based on his 1932 report on the excavation and proposals for restoring the monument. Some displaced stone slabs were returned to the cairn, along with approximately 3,000 truckloads of stone, some of which had originally come from the monument. The reconstructed King's Grave was inaugurated on 20 June 1933.

The restored cairn measures about 75 metres (250 ft) across and 3.5 metres (11 ft) high. The original height and shape of the Nordic Bronze Age monument are uncertain. Twentieth-century estimates placed its original height between approximately 7 metres (23 ft) and 15 metres (49 ft).

The reconstruction also changed how the burial chamber is approached. A passage was built through the cairn to provide access to the decorated cist. The modern stone-built entrance has a protective solid-copper door and was designed to evoke the Lion Gate at Mycenae in Greece.

== Exhibition ==
Today, it is possible for visitors to the site to enter the tomb and to see the engraved stones.

== Gallery ==
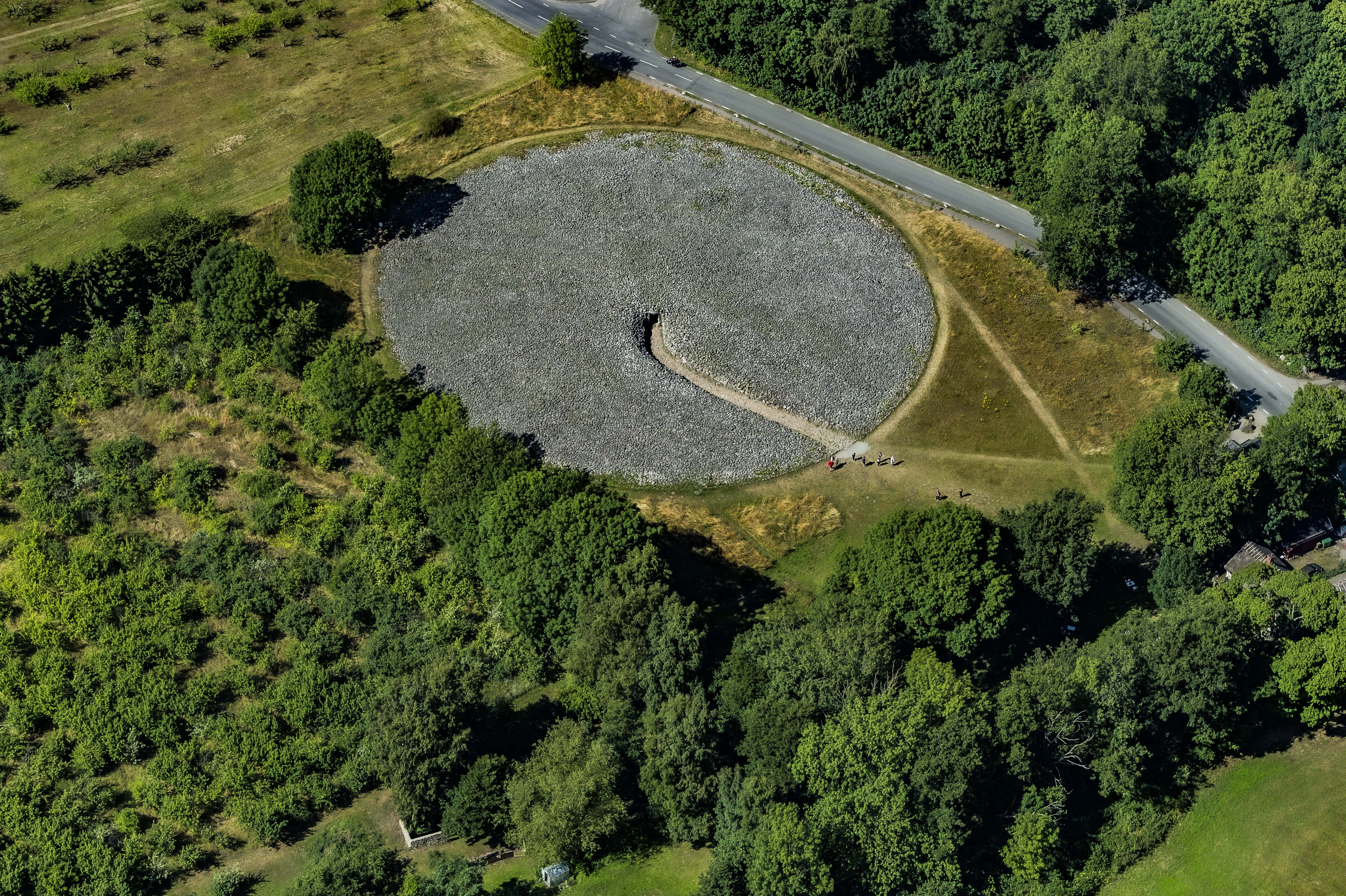
Aerial view of the Kivik grave

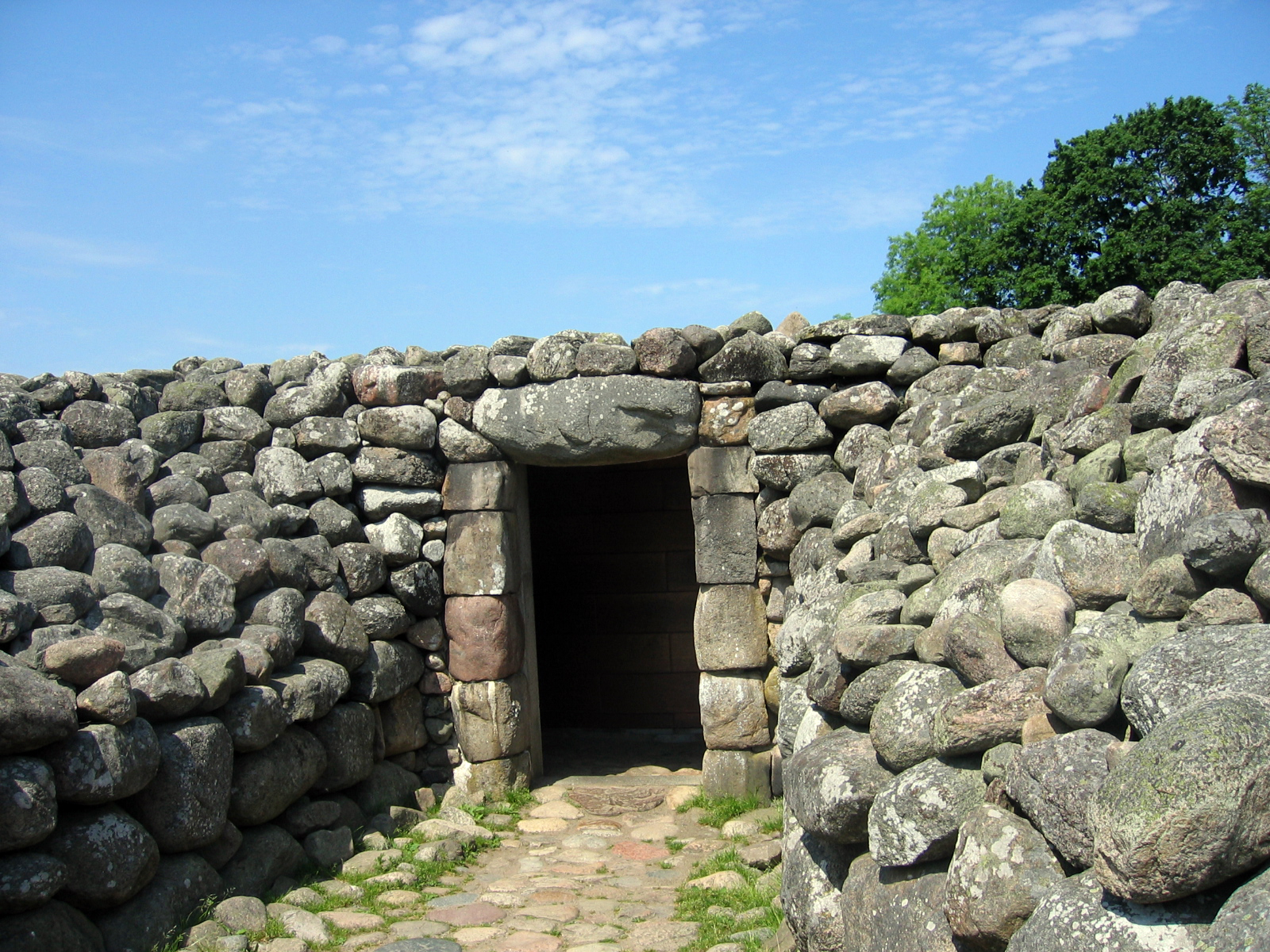
Reconstructed entrance to the tomb

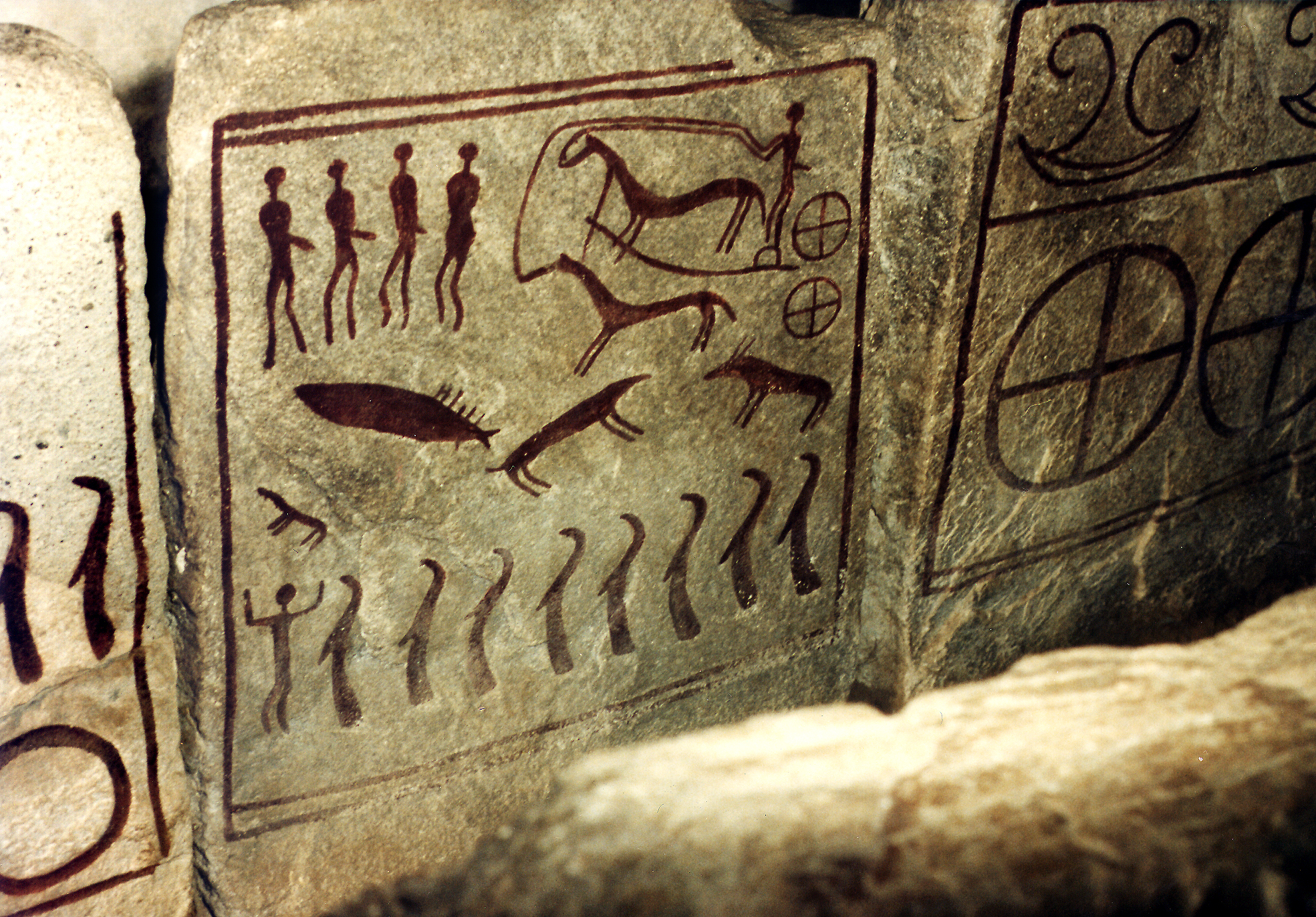
One of ten slabs of stone shows a horse drawn chariot with two four-spoked wheels

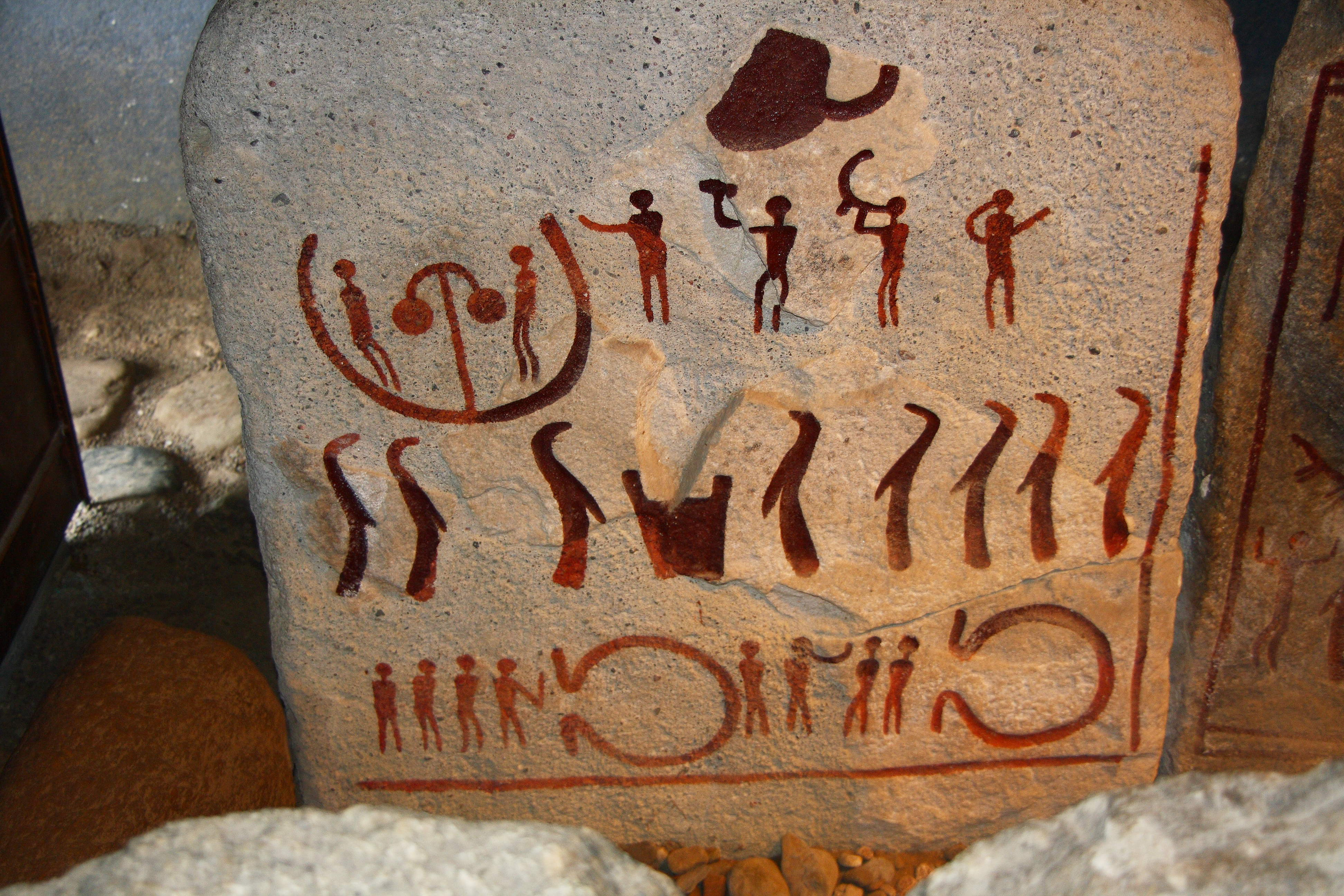
One of the slabs of stone shows people (eight in long robes)

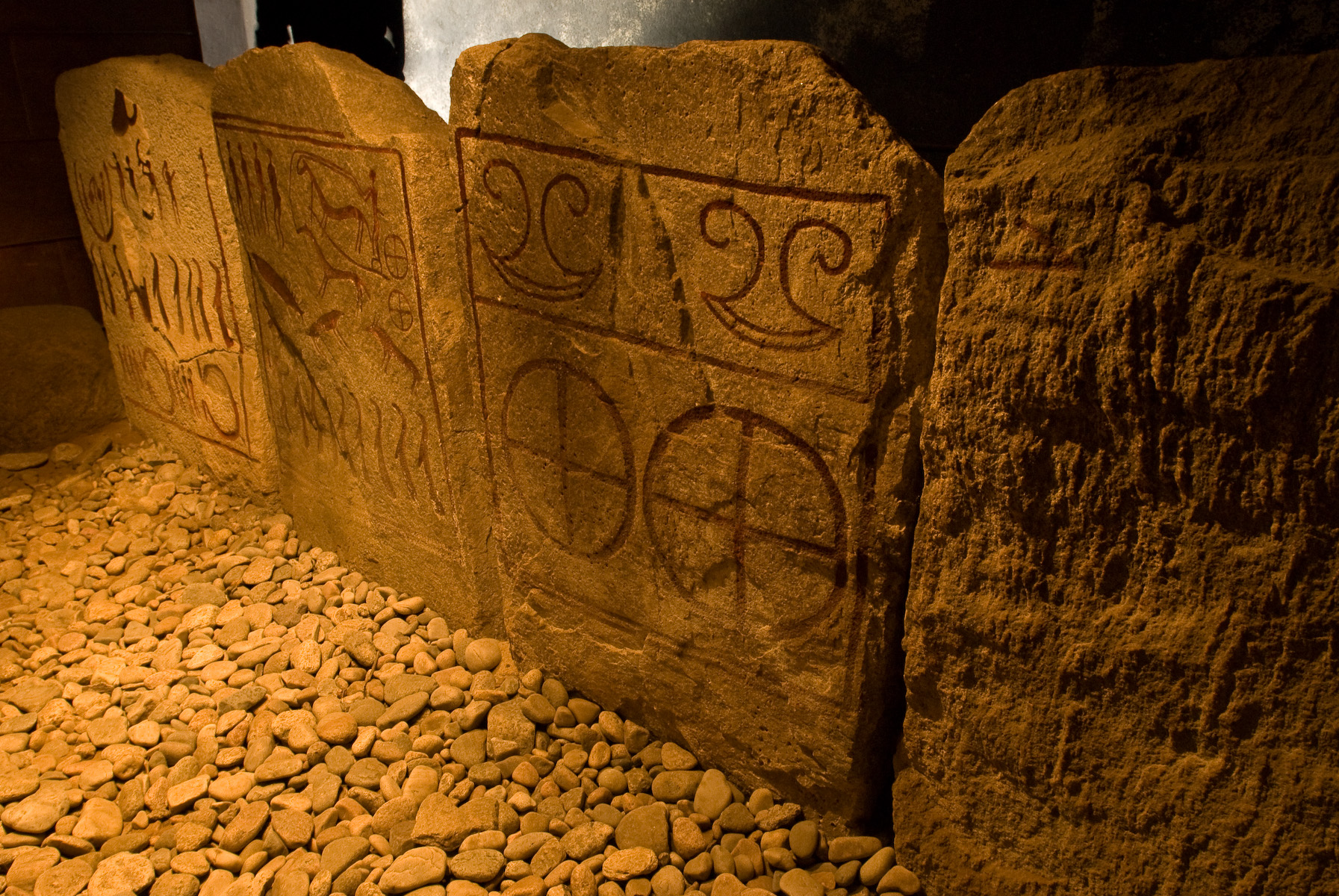
The stones of the grave facing the grave of Kivik

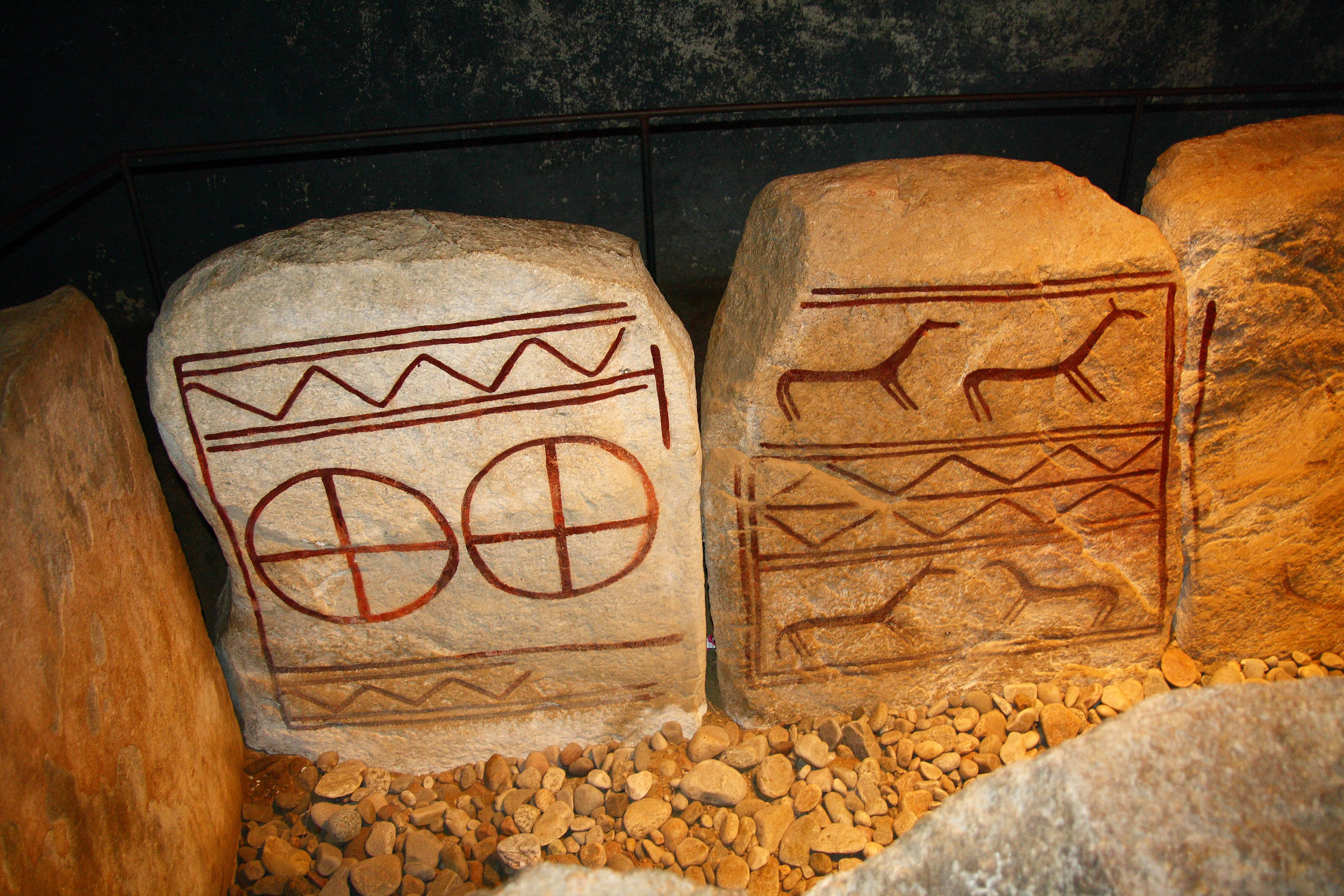
Stones within the cairn of Kivik

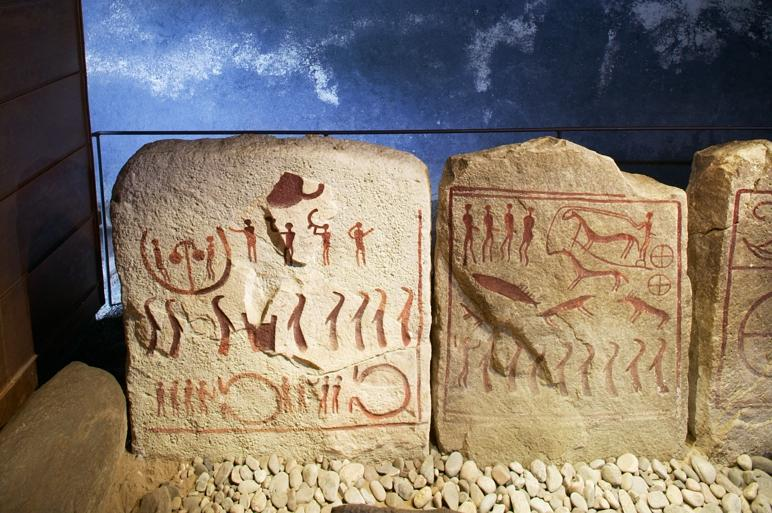
Stones within the cairn of Kivik

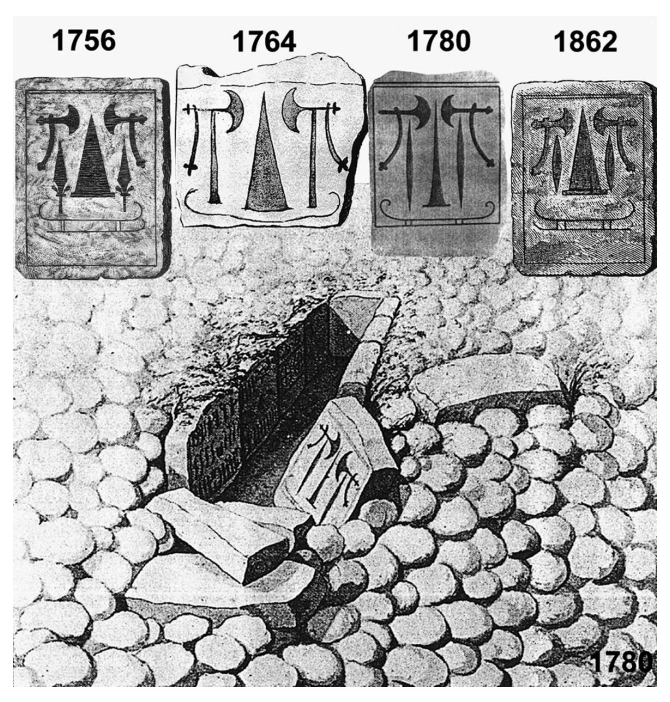
Drawings of one of the petroglyph slabs within the grave (see: Golden hats)

== See also ==
- Egtved Girl
- Sagaholm
- Trundholm sun chariot
- Håga Kurgan
- Skelhøj

== Other sources ==
- Baudou, Evert Gustaf Hallström: arkeolog i världskrigens epok (Stockholm: Natur & Kultur. 1997)
