= Svalinn =

Shield in Nordic mythology

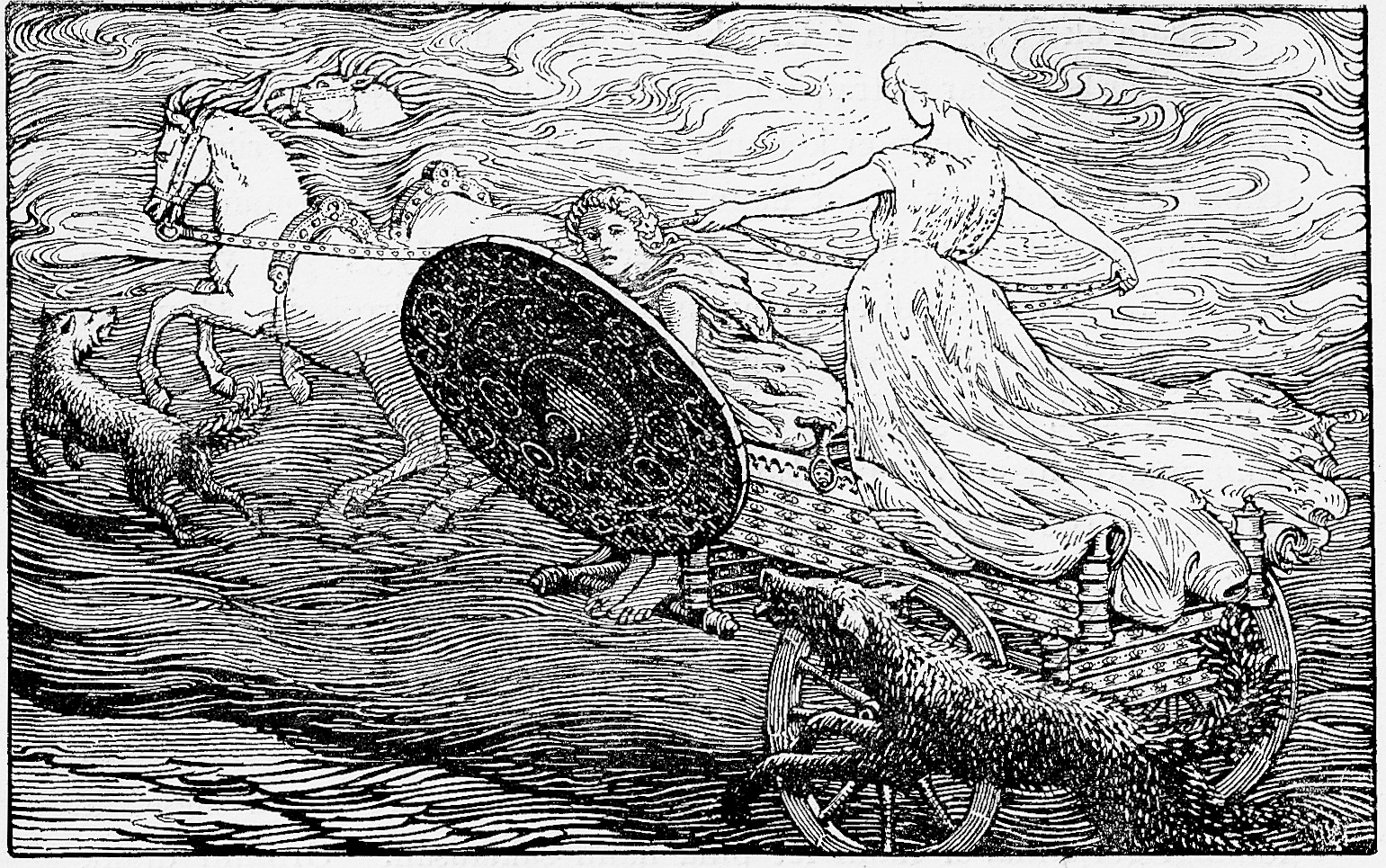
The Chariot of the Sun by W. G. Collingwood

Svalinn is a legendary shield in Nordic mythology which stands in front of Sun, protecting the world from her heat. It has been suggested to be part of a continuous tradition of solar imagery dating back to the Nordic Bronze Age.

== Etymology ==
Svalinn in Old Norse translates as "cold" or "chill" and is derived from the verb svala, meaning "to cool", in turn from the adjective Old Norse: svalr ('cool'), from Proto-Germanic: *swalaz from Proto-Germanic: *swelaną ("to burn slowly, create a burningly cold sensation") from Proto-Indo-European: '*swel-' ("to shine, warm up, burn").

== Attestations ==
=== Grímnismál ===
In Grímnismál, Odin gives the role of Svalinn as part of his description of the cosmology:

Old Norse text	Orchard translation	Bellows translation	Dronke translation
Árvakr ok Alsviðr þeir skulu upp heðan svangir sól draga; en und þeira bógum fálu blíð regin, æsir, ísarnkol. Svalinn heitir, hann stendr sólu fyrir, skjöldr, skínanda goði; björg ok brim, ek veit, at brenna skulu, ef hann fellr í frá.	Early-waker, All-swift: from here they have to drag wearily on Sun; but under their saddle-bows the Aesir have concealed, kind powers, cooling irons Chill is the name, of what stands before the sun, a shield before the shining god. mountains and oceans I know should burn, if it fell from in front.	Arvak and Alsvith up shall drag Weary the weight of the sun; But an iron cool have the kindly gods Of yore set under their yokes. In front of the sun does Svalinn stand, The shield for the shining god; Mountains and sea would be set in flames If it fell from before the sun.	Early Waker and All Strong —slim steeds—up from here have to haul the sun; but under their withers the blithe powers implanted eternal [currents of] iron-cold air. Shiver is its name, he stands before the sun, a shield for the shining goddess. Mountain and main I know must burn, if he falls off.

=== Nafnaþulur ===
In the Nafnaþulur section of the Prose Edda, Snorri Sturluson records Svalinn in a list of shields:

Old Norse text	Ingham translation
Gjallr, döggskafi ok gimskýlir, böðljós, grýta ok böðskýlir, svalinn ok randi, saurnir, borði, skuttingr, barði, skírr, tvíbyrðingr, örlygr ok svarmr, eilífnir, heiðr, baugr, fagrbláinn, bera, miðfjörnir.	Resounding, dew-scraper and gem-shelterer, battle-light, stony and battle-shelter, cooled and board, defiled, border, little stern, beaky, sheer, double boarded, battler and roarer, everlasting, shining, ring, fair-dark, carried, middle-protector.

=== Sigrdrífumál ===
In Sigrdrífumál, runes are described as being carved on a shield, identified with Svalinn, along with the horses that draw Sun's chariot.

Old Norse text	Orchard translation
Á skildi kvað ristnar, þeim er stendr fyr skínandi goði, á eyra Árvakrs ok á Alsvinns hófi, á því hvéli, er snýsk undir reið Hrungnis, á Sleipnis tönnum ok á sleða fjötrum	On the shield they should be cut, that stands before the bright god, on Early-waker's ears and the hoof of All-swift, on the wheel turning under Hrungnir's chariot, on Sleipnir's teeth, and on the straps of sledges

== Interpretation and symbolism ==
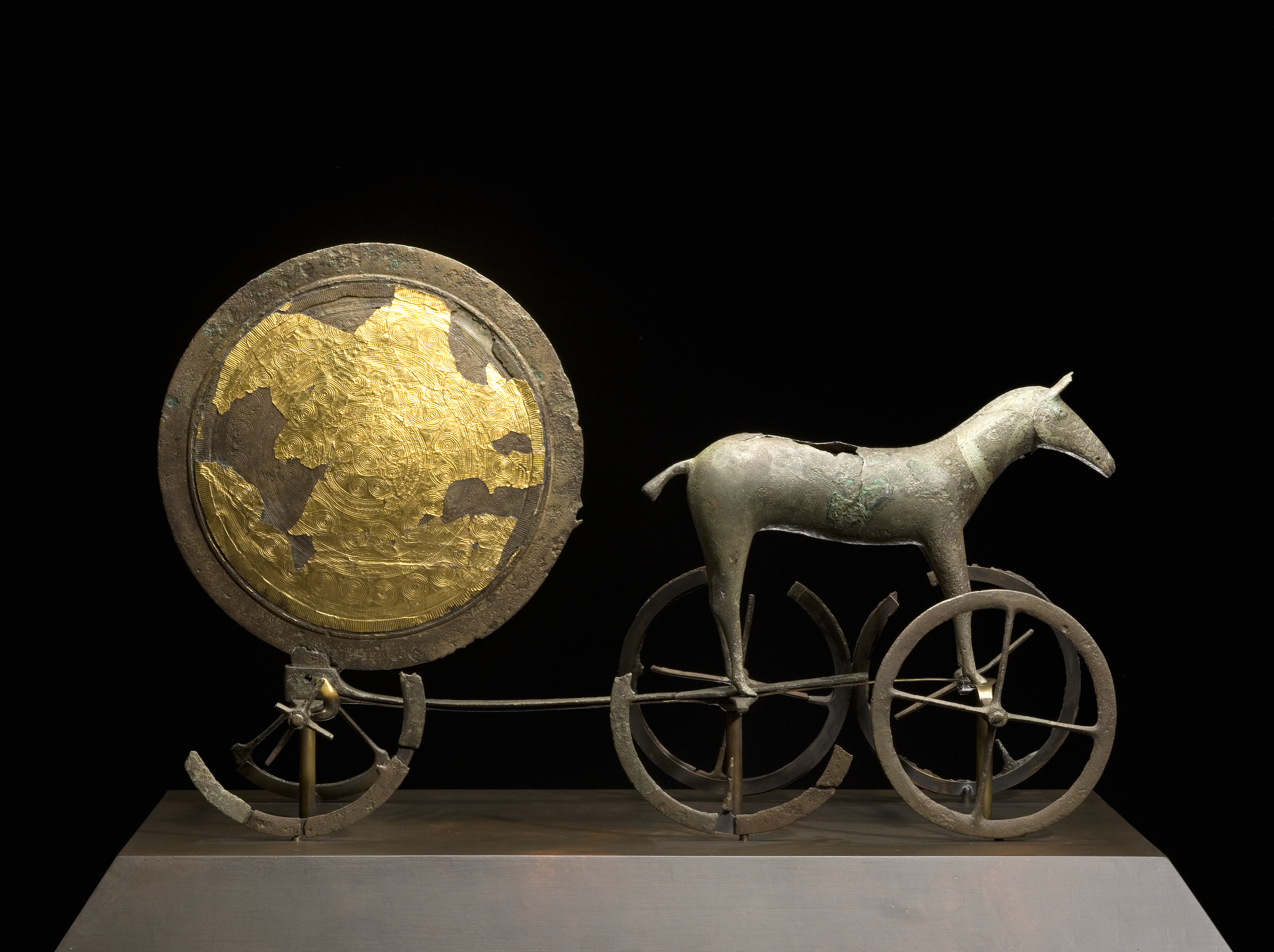
The gilded side of the Trundholm sun chariot

The association between the sun and shields is noted both in Þórsdrápa, in which the sun is described as 'the splendid sky-shield', (Note: An alternative reading based on different emendations identifies Svalinn itself as the 'sky-shield'.) and in Skáldskaparmál, in which a kenning for 'shield' is the "sun of the ship" (Old Norse: skipsól). This relationship between ships, shields and the sun has been suggested to originate in the Nordic Bronze Age, in which all three form part of the sun myth. Ritual shields dating to the Bronze Age have also been discovered in Scandinavia which have been noted by scholars to resemble the sun and were possibly used to represent it in a religious context.

In the Nordic Bronze Age, the sun could be depicted as a wheel cross or a disc, as with the Trundholm sun chariot. It has been argued that the disc later ceased to be seen as a representation of the sun god herself and instead as it appears in the sky, as a round shield. By this theory, the role of the shield in preventing the world from overheating came later to explain its presence.

== See also ==
- Hou Yi—archer in Chinese mythology who saved the world from the heat of suns
- List of mythological objects
- Sun deity
