= Kilen =

Kilen may refer to the following locations:

== Places ==
- Kilen (lake), in Jutland, Denmark
- Kilen, Kristiansand, a village in Kristiansand municipality in Agder county, Norway
- Kilen, Kviteseid, a village in Kviteseid Municipality in Telemark county, Norway
- Kilen, Innlandet, a village in Åsnes Municipality in Innlandet county, Norway
- Kilen, Tvedestrand, a village in Tvedestrand municipality in Agder county, Norway
- Kilen Woods State Park, a state park of Minnesota in the United States
- Kilen, Greenland, a stretch of unglaciated flat land on the eastern side of the Flade Isblink
