= South Jutland =

The name South Jutland can refer to various different areas of the peninsula of Jutland in Denmark:

- Sydjylland – a loose designation for the southern part of the traditional region of Northern Jutland (Danish: Nørrejylland)
- Southern Jutland (Danish: Sønderjylland; German: Südjütland), the area south of Northern Jutland, once equivalent to the Duchy of Schleswig, later (after 1920) the northern part of the old Duchy of Schleswig, then nearly conterminous with the now defunct South Jutland County
- Syd- og Sønderjylland – a collective name for both the above
- The mainland part of the Region of Southern Denmark, as in the electoral district of Sydjylland, i.e. roughly the same as Syd- og Sønderjylland but with a definite boundary
- Duchy of Schleswig, a historic duchy once part of the Kingdom of Denmark, now divided between Germany and Denmark
- South Jutland County, a former administrative region
