= North Jutland =

North Jutland may refer to:

- North Jutland Region, administrative region covering North Jutland and minor parts of central Jutland
- North Jutland County, prior administrative region covering North Jutland
- North Jutlandic Island, northernmost part of Denmark and of Jutland
- Northern Jutland, a historical region in Denmark
- Vendsyssel, the district that makes up most of North Jutland
