= Aalborg Business College =

College in Northern Jutland, Denmark

- Aalborg Handelsskole
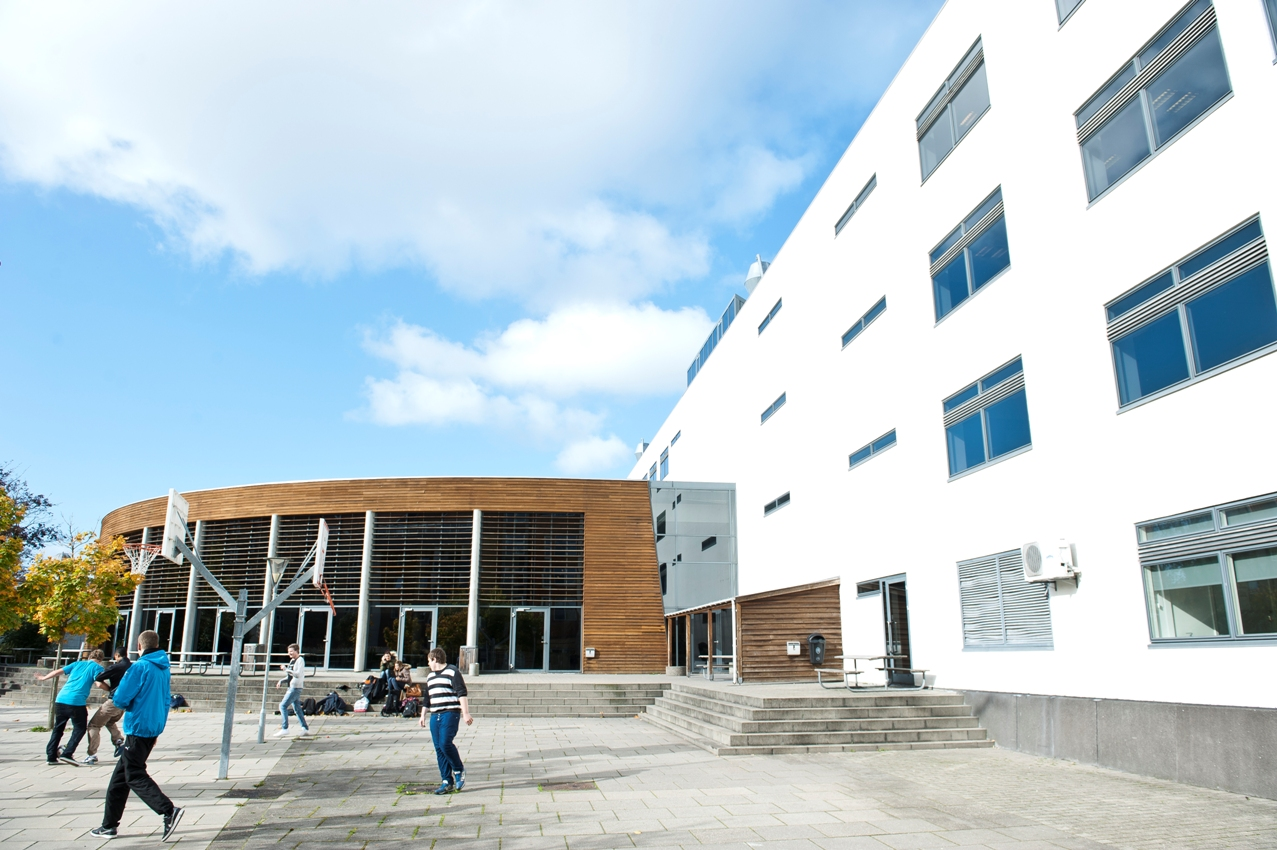
- Aalborg Business College - Strandvejen
- Students: 3,300
- Location: Northern Jutland, Denmark; 57.0534°N 9.9098°E
- Website: ah.dk

Aalborg Business College (Danish: Aalborg Handelsskole) is a business college located in Aalborg, Northern Jutland, Denmark.
