= Søndersø (Furesø Municipality) =

Lake in Furesø Municipality, Denmark

- Interactive map of Søndersø
- Location: Furesø Municipality
- Coordinates: 55°46′30″N 12°21′0″E
- Basin countries: Denmark
- Surface area: 123 ha (300 acres)
- Average depth: 3.3 m (11 ft)
- Max. depth: 7.8 m (26 ft)
- Settlements: Værløse

Søndersø is a lake in Furesø Municipality, Denmark, southwest of the town of Værløse.

== See also ==
- List of lakes of Denmark
