= Søndersø (Lolland) =

Lake in Guldborgsund Municipality, Denmark

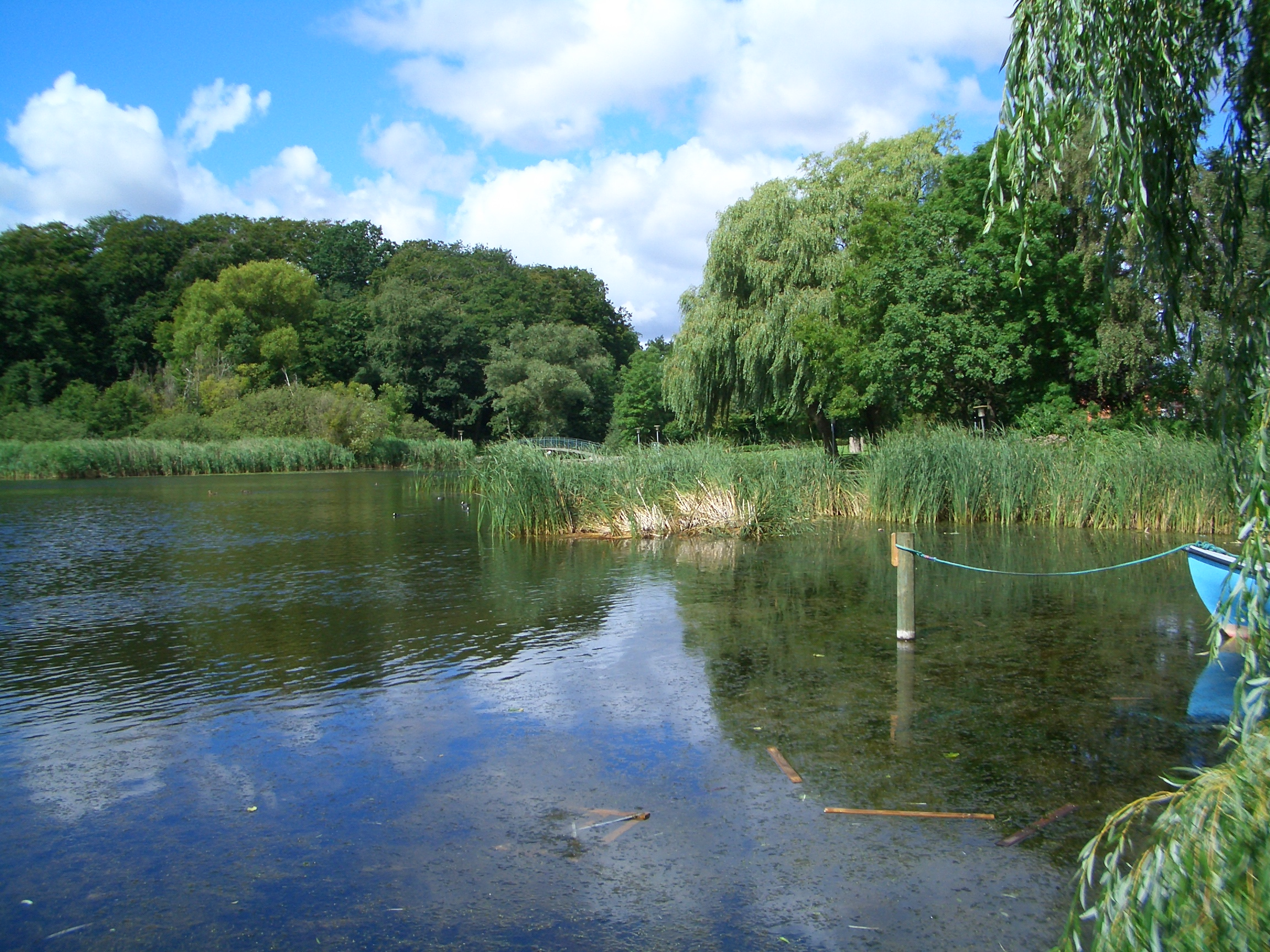
- Søndersø (2005)
- Interactive map of Søndersø
- Location: Guldborgsund Municipality, Lolland Municipality
- Group: Maribo Lakes
- Coordinates: 54°45′20″N 11°30′20″E
- Basin countries: Denmark
- Surface area: 852 ha (2,110 acres)
- Average depth: 1.7 m (5.6 ft)
- Max. depth: 5 m (16 ft)
- Surface elevation: 8.8 m (29 ft)
- Settlements: Maribo

Søndersø, also known as Maribo Søndersø, is a lake on Lolland, Denmark, just south of the town of Maribo. With a surface area of 852 hectares (2,110 acres), it is the largest of the Maribo Lakes (Danish: Maribosøerne) and the largest lake on Lolland.

== See also ==
- List of lakes of Denmark
