= Håga mound =

Tumulus in Uppsala, Sweden

Coordinates: 59°50′N 17°35′E

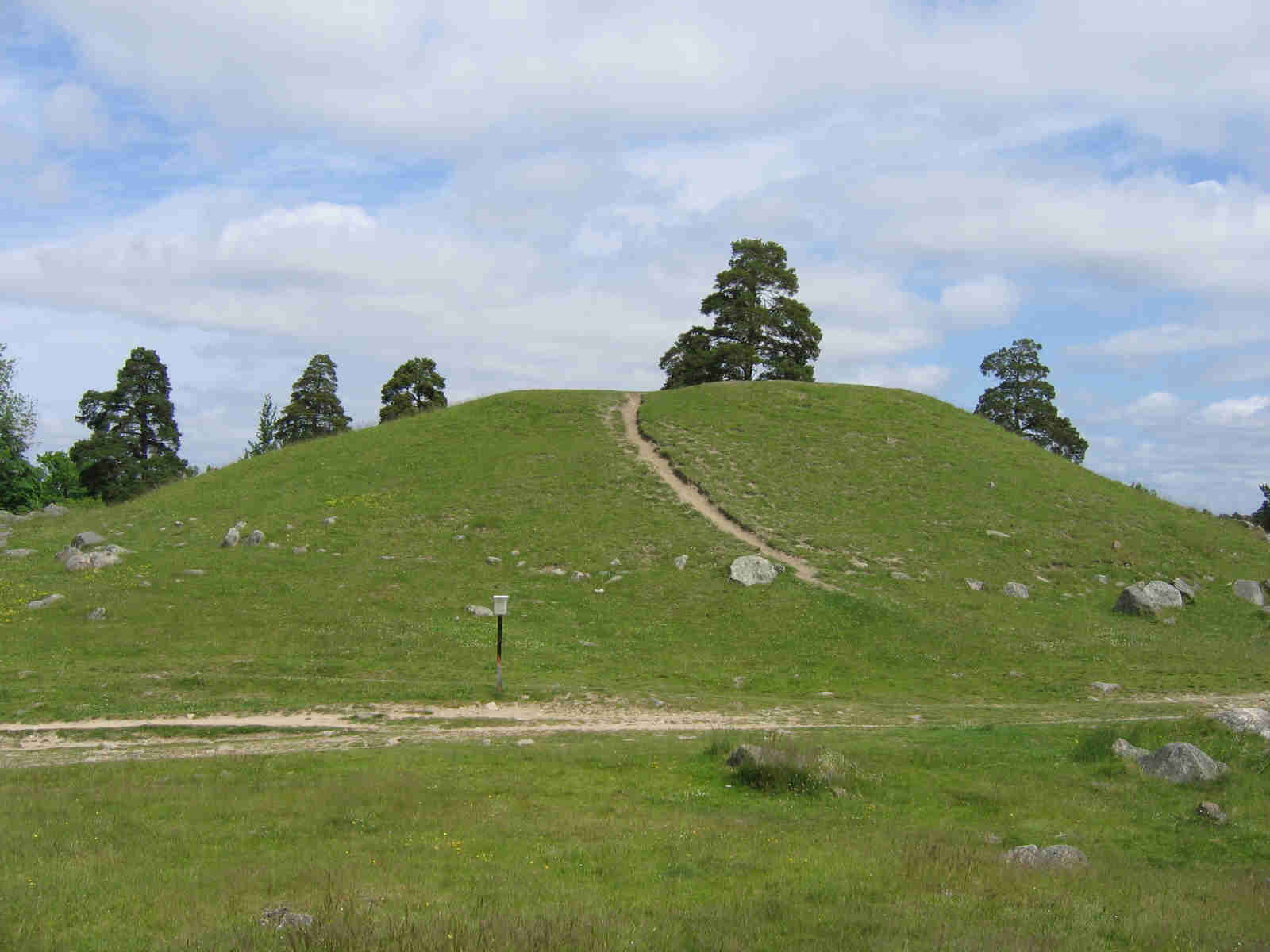
Hågahögen

The Håga mound (Hågahögen) or King Björn's Mound (Kung Björns hög) is a large Nordic Bronze Age tumulus in the western outskirts of Uppsala, Sweden. It is one of the most magnificent remains from the Nordic Bronze Age. It is Scandinavia's most gold-rich bronze age grave ever found.

== Hågahögen ==
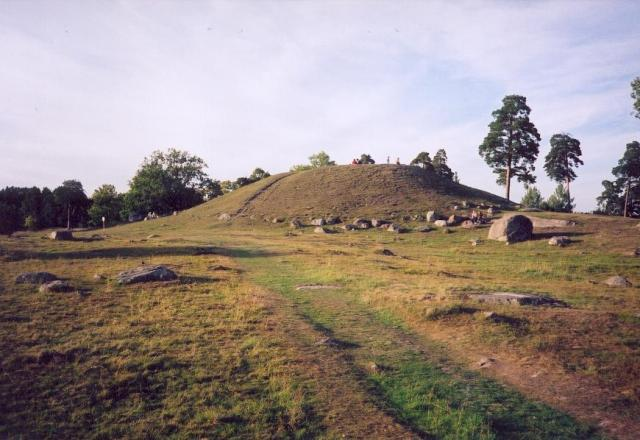
Hågahögen

Hågahögen mound is approximately 7 metres high and 45 metres across. It was constructed circa 1000 B.C. by the shore of a narrow inlet of the sea. (The land has been continually rising since the Ice Age due to post-glacial rebound). The mound was built of turfs that had been laid on top of a cairn. The cairn, in turn, was built on top of a wooden chamber containing a hollow oak coffin. Within the coffin are the cremated remains of a short man. During the burial there had probably been human sacrifice, the evidence for which is human bones from which the marrow had been removed.

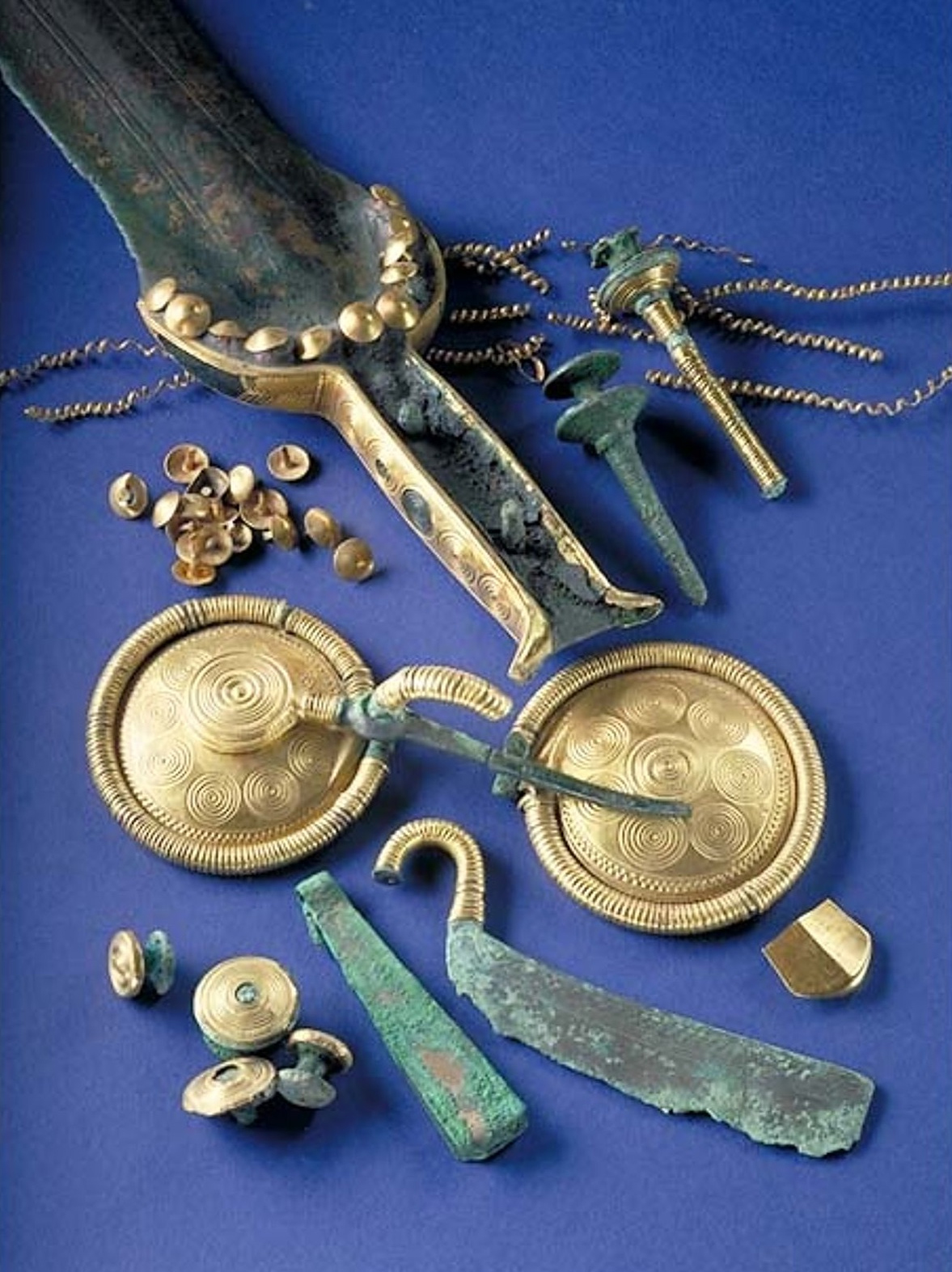
Bronze Age grave goods from the Hågahögen mound

The coffin contained rich unburnt bronze objects such as a Bronze age sword, a razor, two brooches, a number of thickly gilded buttons, two pincers and various other bronze objects. They may all come from the same workshop in Zealand.

The mound was excavated 1902–1903 by Oscar Almgren together with the future king Gustaf VI Adolf. Only minor excavations have been done in the Bronze Age settlement but the area contains several house foundations in stone. The findings from Hågahögen were stored in the Swedish Museum of National Antiquities (Historiska museet) on Narvavägen in Östermalm in Stockholm.

In February 1986 a theft was committed in the Swedish Museum of National Antiquities. One of the museum's art objects, the Bronze Age spectacle-shaped gilt brooch found in 1902–03 at Hågahögen, was stolen. Parts of it were found outside the museum's main entrance some months later after snow had melted.

== Etymology ==
The place name Håga means the "tall mound". It is mentioned in the Hervarar saga as Haugi (from the Old Norse haugr meaning knoll, mound or a hill). The name Björn's mound is from the Swedish king Björn at Haugi (Björn at the mound), who used to live at the royal estate (see Uppsala öd) of Håga, while his brother and co-king Anund Uppsale resided at Old Uppsala. The connection between the king and the mound was later reversed: the mound was named after the king, as the king had previously received his cognomen from the mound.

== See also ==
- Bronze age sword
- the King's Grave
- Kurgan
- Nordic Bronze Age
- Sagaholm

== Other sources ==
- Almgren, O. (1905) Kung Björns hög och andra fornlämningar vid Håga (KVHAA Monografi nr 1. Stockholm)
