= Maribo Lakes =

- Maribosøerne (Danish)
- Interactive map of Maribo Lakes
- Location: Guldborgsund Municipality, Lolland Municipality
- Coordinates: 54°44′N 11°33′E
- Basin countries: Denmark
- Surface area: 1,140 ha (2,800 acres)

The Maribo Lakes (Danish: Maribosøerne) are a group of lakes on Lolland, Denmark, around the town of Maribo. The group consists of the four lakes Hejrede Sø, Nørresø, Røgbølle Sø and Søndersø, with a combined surface area of 1,140 ha (2,800 acres).

The area is a Natura 2000 protected area and a Ramsar site.

== See also ==
- List of lakes of Denmark
- List of Ramsar Sites
