= Tystrup Sø =

Lake in Zealand, Denmark

Tystrup Lake
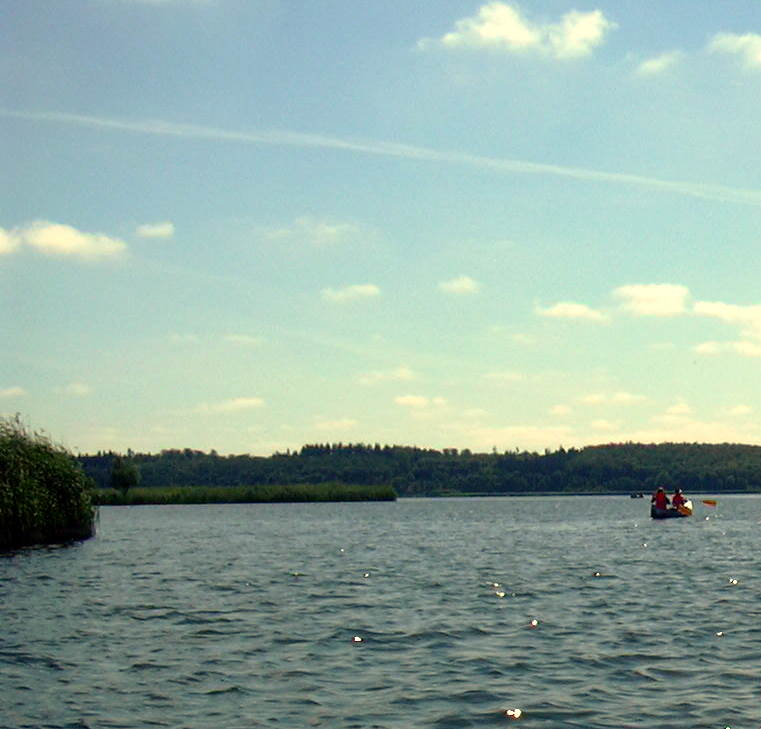

- Location within Denmark
- Location: Denmark
- Coordinates: 55.370411°N 11.576557°E
- Surface area: 6.62 km^{2} (2.56 sq mi)
- Average depth: 9.9 m (32 ft)
- Max. depth: 21.7 m (71 ft)
- Residence time: 180 d (16,000 ks)

Tystrup Lake is a lake in Zealand.

== See also ==
- List of lakes in Denmark
