= Trundholm sun chariot =

Late Nordic Bronze Age artifact discovered in Denmark

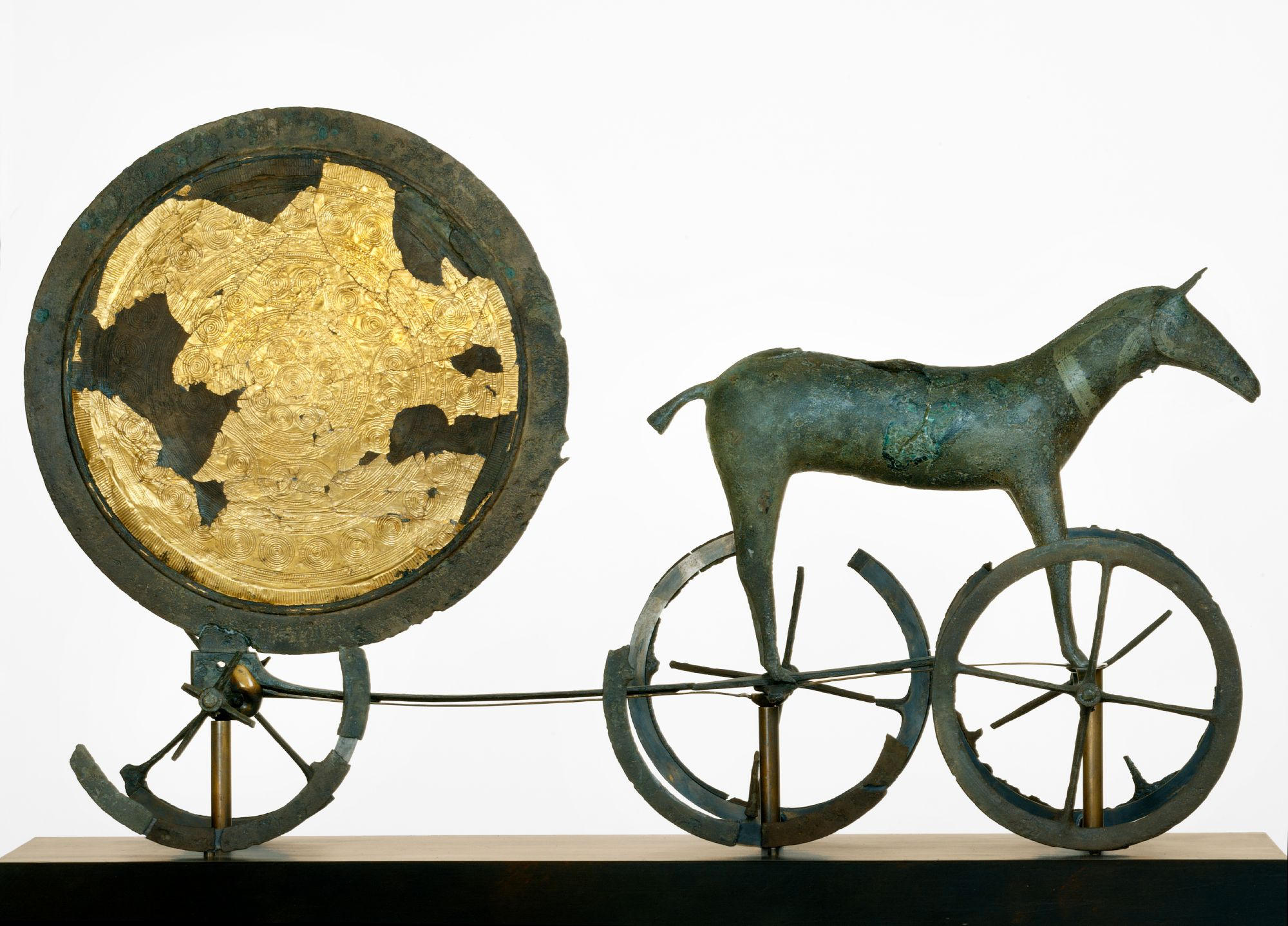
- Material: Bronze
- Length: c. 54 cm
- Height: c. 35 cm
- Width: c. 29 cm
- Created: c. 1400 BC
- Discovered: 1902; Zealand, Denmark
- Present location: National Museum of Denmark, Capital Region, Denmark

The Trundholm sun chariot (Danish: Solvognen) is a Nordic Bronze Age artifact discovered in Denmark. It is a representation of the sun chariot, a bronze statue of a horse and a large bronze disk, which are placed on a device with spoked wheels.

The sculpture was discovered with no accompanying objects in 1902 in a peat bog on the Trundholm moor in Odsherred in the northwestern part of Zealand, (approximately 55°55′N 11°37′E). In 1998, archaeologists and metal detectorists returned to the original site and recovered 21 additional parts of the Sun Chariot, including wheels and spokes. It is now in the collection of the National Museum of Denmark in Copenhagen. It is featured on the 1,000-krone banknote of the 2009 series.

== Description ==
The horse stands on a bronze rod supported by four wheels. The rod below the horse is connected to the disk, which is supported by two wheels. All of the wheels have four spokes. The artifact was cast in the lost wax method. The whole object is around 54 cm × 35 cm × 29 cm (21 in × 14 in × 11 in) in size (length, height, width). Aspects of the decoration suggest a Danubian influence in the object, although it was produced locally.

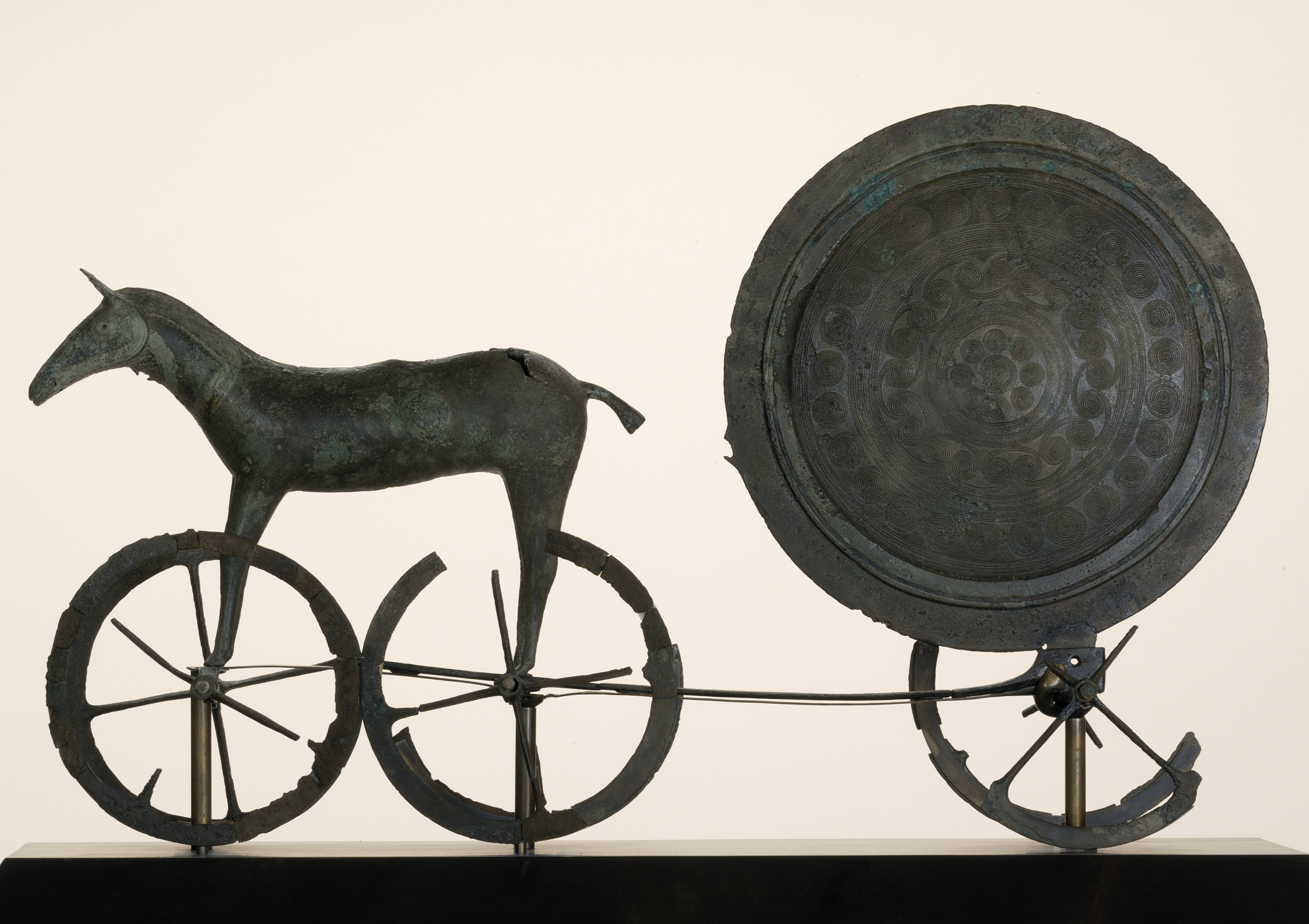
The left side of the disk shows no traces of gilding

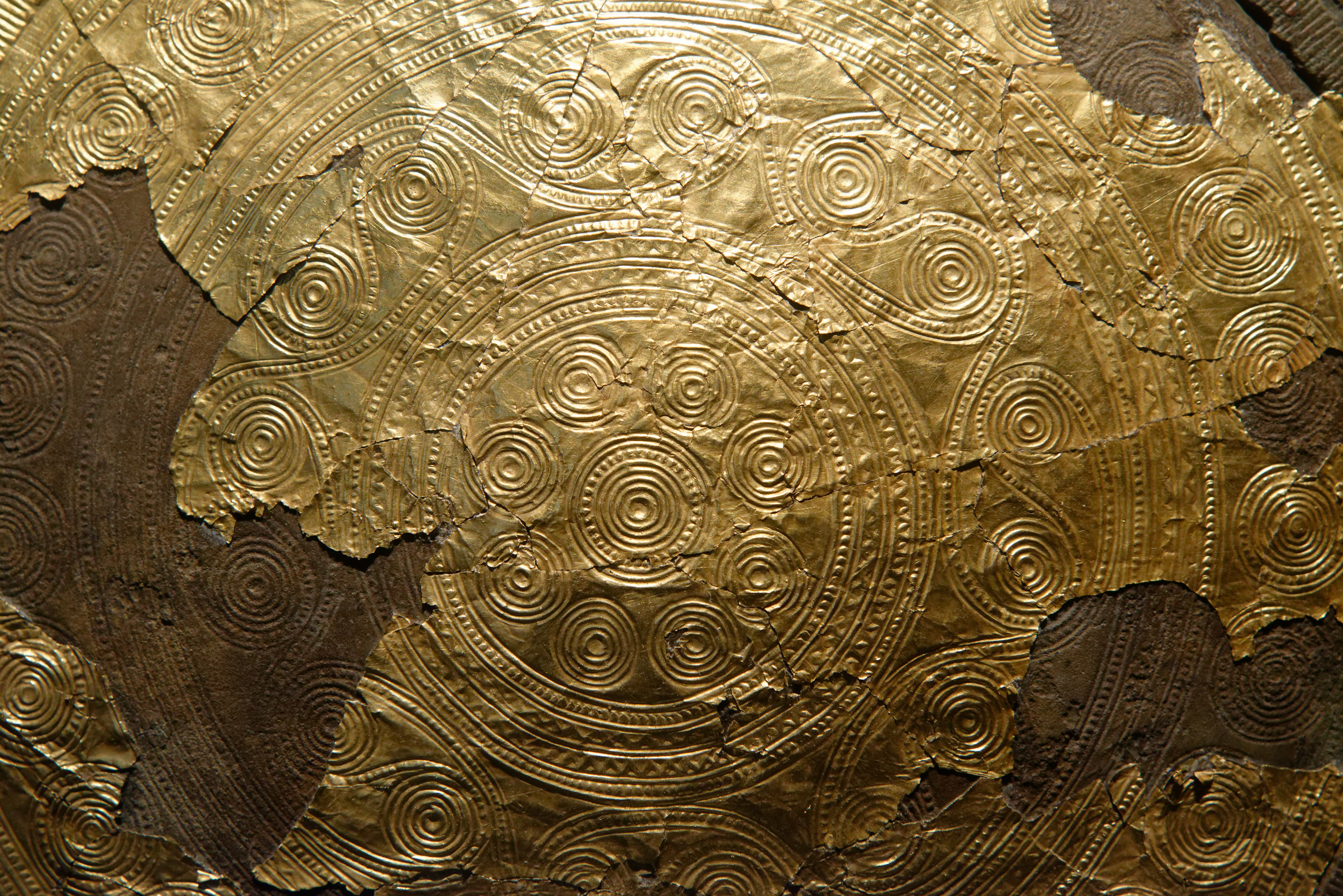
Gold disc detail

The disk has a diameter of around 25 cm (9.8 in). It is gilded on one side only, the right-hand side (when looking at the horse from behind). It consists of two bronze disks that are joined by an outer bronze ring, with a thin sheet of gold applied to one face. The disks were then decorated with punches and gravers with zones of motifs of concentric circles, with bands of zig-zag decoration between borders. The gold side has an extra outer zone which may represent rays, and also a zone with concentric circles linked by looping bands that "instead of flowing in one direction, progress like the steps of the dance, twice forward and once back". The main features of the horse are also highly decorated.

The two sides of the disk have been interpreted as an indication of a belief that the Sun is drawn across the heavens from East to West during the day, presenting its bright side to the Earth and returns from West to East during the night, when the dark side is being presented to the Earth. A continuation around a globe would have the same result. It is thought that the chariot was pulled around during religious rituals to demonstrate the motion of the Sun in the heavens.

Two similar discs have been found in Ireland: the Lattoon gold disc and the bronze Cooke disc, the latter dated to c. 1500–1300 BC. The Cooke disc has similar fittings to the Trundholm chariot, suggesting that it was also originally connected to a sun horse and mounted on wheels.

== Date ==
The sculpture is dated to about 1400 BC, or Montellius period II (c. 1500–1300 BC).

Evidence for horse-drawn chariots first appears in Scandinavia around 1700 BC, in the form of petroglyphs, chariot bits and whip handles.

== Calendar ==
Some authors have suggested that the decoration on the disc numerically encodes a calendar. The archaeologist Christoph Sommerfeld argues that both sides of the disc encode knowledge of the 19-year lunisolar Metonic cycle. The Metonic cycle is also thought to be encoded on the later Berlin Gold Hat from around 900 BC.

== Sun chariot in Indo-European mythology and religions ==
=== Norse mythology ===
The chariot has been interpreted as a possible Bronze Age predecessor to Skinfaxi, the horse that pulled Dagr, the personification of day, across the sky.

=== Celtic Pantheon ===
The sky god Taranis is typically depicted with the attribute of a spoked wheel.

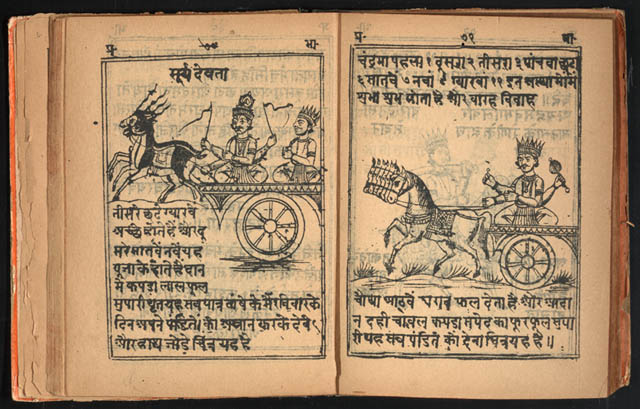
Surya's chariot

=== Hindu scriptures ===
The Rigveda in Hindu scriptures also reflects the mention of the Sun chariot. RV 10.85 mentions the sun god's bride as seated on a chariot pulled by two steeds. The relevant verses are the following (trans. Griffith):

10. Her spirit was the bridal car; the covering thereof was heaven: Bright were both Steeds that drew it when Surya approached her husband's home.
11. Thy Steeds were steady, kept in place by holy verse and Sama-hymn: All car were thy two chariot wheels: thy path was tremulous in the sky,
12. Clean, as thou wentest, were thy wheels, wind was the axle fastened there. Surya, proceeding to her Lord, mounted a spirit-fashioned car.

=== Greek mythology ===
In Greek mythology, the solar deity Helios was said to wear a radiant crown as his horse-drawn chariot raced across the sky, bringing daylight.

== See also ==
- Egtved Girl
- Golden hat
- Håga Kurgan
- Nebra sky disc
- Phaethon
- Sól
- Sun worship
- The King's Grave
- Urnfield culture
- Strettweg cult wagon

== Sources ==
- Sandars, Nancy K., Prehistoric Art in Europe, Penguin (Pelican, now Yale, History of Art), 1968 (nb 1st edn.)
