= Kilen (lake) =

Lake in Jutland, Denmark

Kilen Lake
- Location within Denmark
- Location: Denmark
- Coordinates: 56.500083333°N 8.56815°E
- Surface area: 3.34 km^{2} (1.29 sq mi)
- Average depth: 2.9 m (9 ft 6 in)
- Max. depth: 6.5 m (21 ft)
- Residence time: 266 d (23,000 ks)

Kilen Lake is a lake in Jutland.

== See also ==
- List of lakes in Denmark
