= Tangeværket =

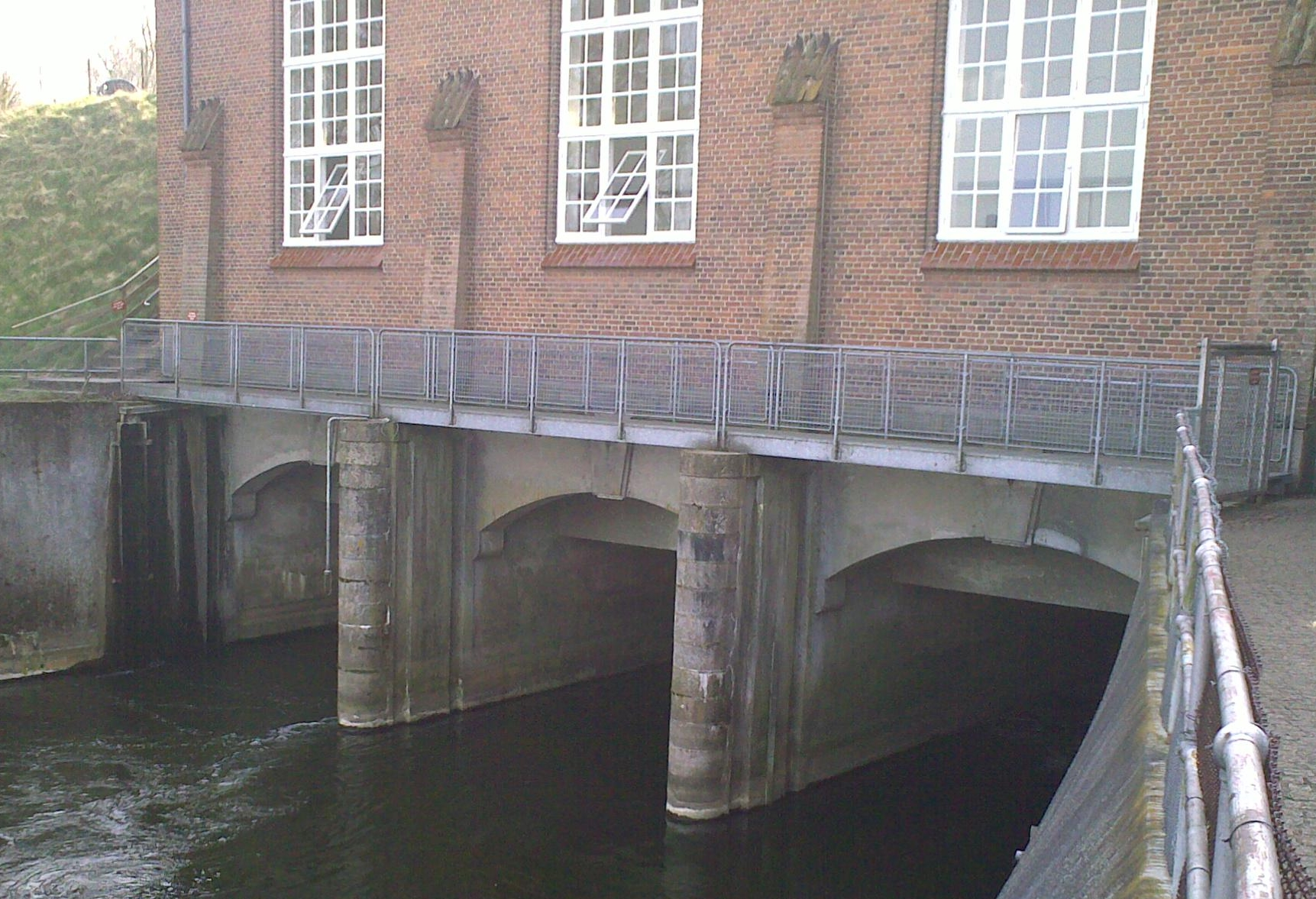
- Powerhouse

- Location within Denmark
- Country: Denmark
- Location: Tange, Viborg Municipality
- Coordinates: 56°21′4.72″N 9°36′13.95″E
- Purpose: Power
- Status: Operational
- Construction began: 1918
- Opening date: 1921; 105 years ago

Dam and spillways
- Height: 12 m (39 ft)
- Length: 800 m (2,600 ft)
- Width (crest): 10 m (33 ft)
- Width (base): 50 m (160 ft)

Reservoir
- Creates: Tange Sø
- Total capacity: 20,000,000 m^{3} (16,000 acre⋅ft)
- Surface area: 625 ha (1,540 acres)

Power Station
- Operator: Gudenaacentralen AN/S
- Commission date: 1920
- Hydraulic head: 10.5 m (34 ft)
- Turbines: 3 x 1.1 MW Francis-type
- Installed capacity: 3.3 MW
- Capacity factor: 38%
- Annual generation: 11,000 MWh

Gudenaacentralen, (Note: Also spelled Gudenåcentralen in post-1948 orthography.) commonly known as Tangeværket (lit. 'Tange Power Station'), is a hydroelectric earth-fill embankment dam on the Gudenå River just east of the village of Tange in Viborg Municipality, Denmark. The primary purpose of the dam is hydroelectric power production and it supports a 3.3 MW power station which is the largest in the nation. The dam and power station were designed by Kristian Thomsen and S. A. Angelo in 1909. Construction did not begin until an agreement was reached with the Gudenå Commission. To build the dam, 500 men moved, by hand, about 300,000 m^{3} (390,000 cu yd) of earth. The power station was commissioned on 20 December 1920 and the reservoir flooded five homes and 22 farms. Its inauguration occurred on 8 January 1921. To produce power, water from the reservoir moves down a 500 m (1,600 ft) long and 6 m (20 ft) deep channel to the power station which houses three 1.1 MW Francis turbine-generators. The dam is also equipped with a fish ladder.

The power station's original concession for power production was set for 80 years. The concession has since been prolonged several times. Last in 2015 where it was prolonged by another 30 years.
