= Kongeå =

River in Denmark

Coordinates: 55°23′N 8°39′E

Kongeå Königsau (German)
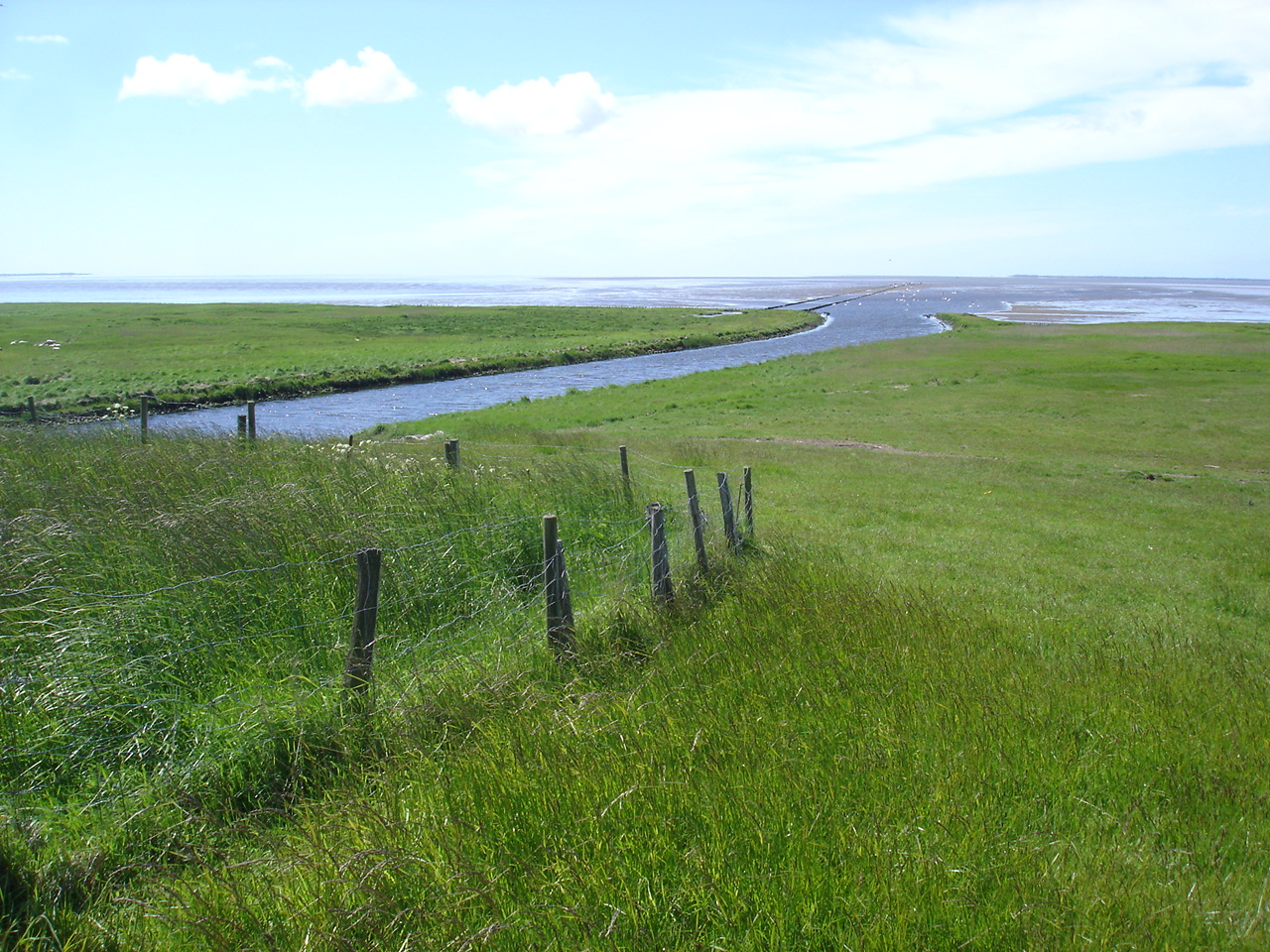
- The mouth of the Kongeå, flowing into the Wadden Sea.

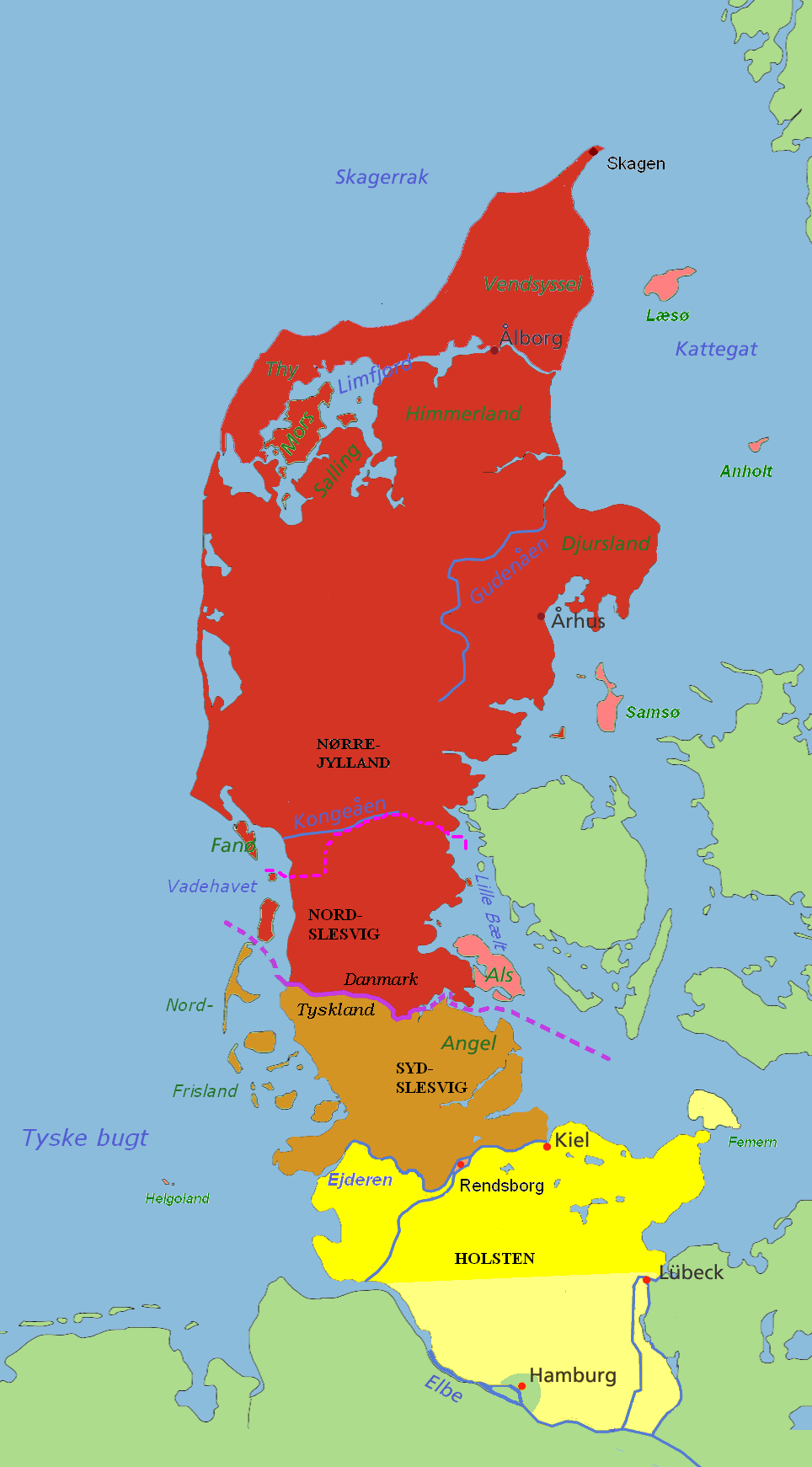
- Map of Jutland with the Kongeå on the western coast.

Physical characteristics
- Mouth: Wadden Sea
- Length: 65 km (40 mi)

The Kongeå (German: Königsau) is a watercourse in Southern Jutland in Jutland, Denmark. It rises southeast of Vejen and Vamdrup and after about 50 kilometres (31 mi) it flows through a sluice to tidal mudflats and sandbanks north of Ribe, and eventually into the North Sea. The eastern section is little more than a stream, while the western section is navigable by boat as far as the sluice. The Kongeå, however, passes no port or market town of any significance, and small boats use the Ribe Å.

Historically, the watercourse has been the administrative border between regions to the north and south. In the Middle Ages it was called Skodborg Å after the royal castle Skodborghus, where a track crossed the watercourse south of Vejen. For centuries a customs border near the Kongeå separated the Kingdom of Denmark from the duchy of Schleswig. From 1864 to 1920, except in the extreme west, the Kongeåen marked the border between Denmark and Germany.

The Kongeå is mentioned (as "Skotborg river") in the Heimskringla in a description of the 1043 battle in which King Magnus I of Norway and Denmark defeated at Lyrskov Hede (Hlyrskog Heath) a large army of Slavs who had invaded southern Denmark from the current Mecklenburg region in retaliation for a Viking attack on Jomsborg, which at the time was the Slavic kingdom's primary town on Wolin island.

The area around the river is the site of several preserved burial mounds that have been the subject of archeological study, including Skelhøj.
