= Skelhøj =

Coordinates: 55.4127°N 8.8709°E

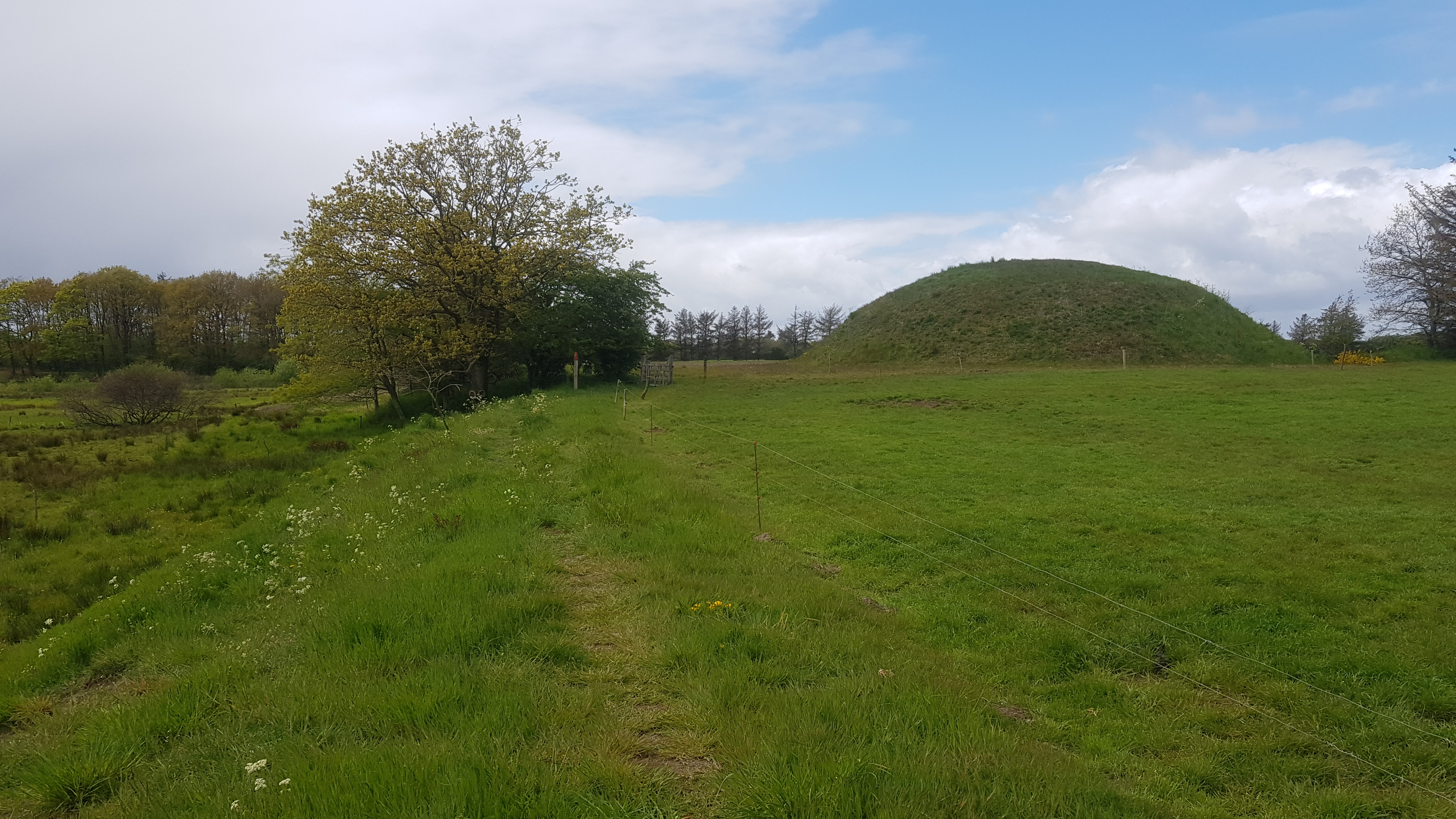
Skelhøj

Skelhøj is a burial mound from the early Bronze Age, situated near the Kongeå River in southern Denmark. It was archaeologically excavated between 2002 and 2004.

== History ==
Skelhøj is an individual burial mound that is part of a broader series of 26 along the Kongeå River in Southern Denmark. It was likely built in one singular effort over the span of a few months. Other well preserved burial mounds from the area include Trindhøj, Guldhøj, Store Kongehøj, and Storehøj at Tobøl. Many such mounds were built across Denmark, predominantly during the Early Bronze Age (1500 to 1100 cal. BC); scholar Jørgen Jensen estimated the number at 85,000.

The mound was dated to the 15th century BC using radiocarbon dating. Archeologists estimate that it was originally 7–7.5 metres (23–25 ft) tall, though this had decreased to 5 metres (16 ft) by the time excavations were undertaken, and in a broadly circular form with a 30 metres (98 ft) diameter.

=== Construction ===
Archeologists suggest that the area where the mound was constructed was first burned to clear it, then the oak coffin was placed down and covered by a cairn, at which point the barrow itself was built. It was likely built in one singular effort over the span of a few months, with eight different sections being constructed by different groups of workers. The mound was divided into eight sections, evocative of an eight-spoked wheel, each of which were constructed independently, and the groups involved in construction may have brought turf from the area they lived in.

The mound was robbed, likely shortly after construction, and another time in the 19th century.

=== Excavation ===
It was completely excavated from 2002 to 2004. Archeologists sought to study how the burial mound's oak coffin was preserved along with what was within it, how the barrow was constructed, and what the landscape around the mound looked like when the mound was constructed. They concluded that the coffin had been covered in large amounts of water shortly after burial, which created what they described as an "iron capsule" around the coffin through a chemical reduction reaction.
