= Northern Jutland =

Historical region in Northern Denmark

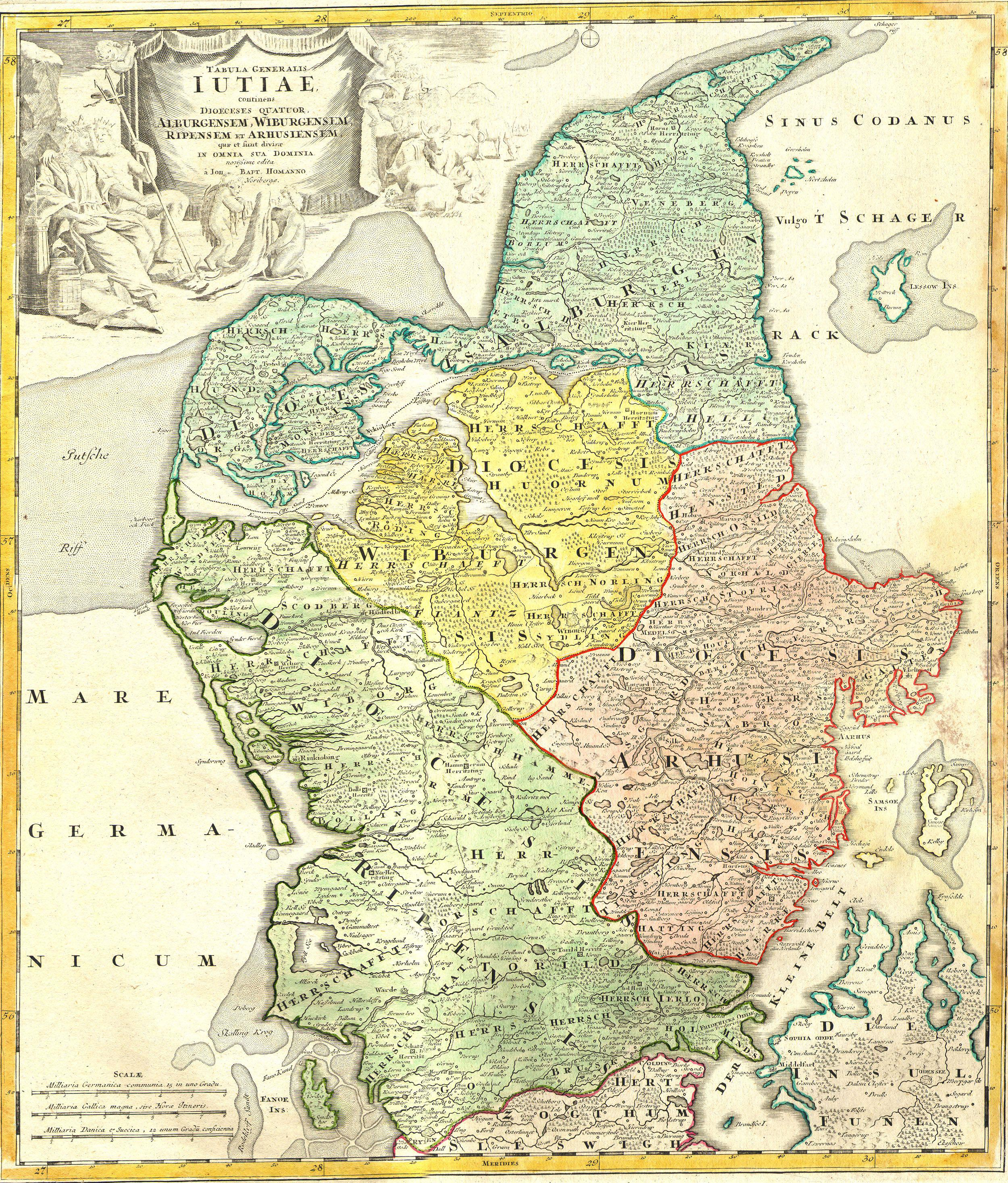
1710 map of Northern Jutland, depicting the borders of the dioceses of Aalborg (in blue), Aarhus (red), Viborg (yellow), and Ribe (green).

Northern Jutland (Danish: Nørrejylland) is a historical region in Denmark, defined as Jutland north of the Kongeå (with the region south of the Kongeå called Southern Jutland (Sønderjylland)). As with other historical regions of Denmark, Northern Jutland had its own ting assembly in the Middle Ages, seated in Viborg.

Today, Northern Jutland is covered by the regions of North Jutland and Central Jutland (except for Samsø^{[a]}), and the northern parts of the Region of Southern Denmark.

== Notes ==
^{a} Samsø was historically grouped with Zealand, and was thus not included in Northern Jutland. Samsø was moved into the new Aarhus County in 1970, and that county was merged with neighboring areas to become the Central Jutland region in 2007. For this reason, everything in Central Jutland except for Samsø is part of the historical Northern Jutland.
