= List of municipalities of Denmark (1970–2006) =

Municipalities of Denmark, 1970-2006. Bornholm shown after it was merged from 1 January 2003.

Until December 31, 2006, Denmark was divided into 13 counties (amter), and 270 municipalities (kommuner). See List of municipalities of Denmark for the subdivision into 5 regions and 98 municipalities from January 1, 2007. The easternmost land in Denmark, the small Ertholmene archipelago, area 39 hectares (0.16 square miles), normally only mentioned by the name of its largest islet, Christiansø, which lies 11 miles (18 kilometers) to the northeast of Bornholm, was and is not part of a municipality or county or region but was and still is administered by the Ministry of Defence. Its population was 83 (January 1, 2018).

Municipal seat is indicated if the name differs from the name of the municipality.

== Århus Amt (Århus County, seat: Århus) ==
From 1 April 1948, Aa was changed to Å as a result of the Spelling reform (Danish Retskrivningsreformen). Aarhus municipal council and Aarhus county chose to use the letter Å instead of Aa, but it was optional for counties or municipalities or cities/towns whether they would keep or change the original spelling from before 1948. From January 2011, four (4) years after the counties were abolished, the politicians in the municipality chose to return to the original spelling Aa instead of Å. But the county of Århus from 1948 until it was abolished 1 January 2007 and the municipality Århus and city Århus from 1948 until 2010 was spelled Århus, and from January 2011 Aarhus again. Å (in capital) or å (in minor) and Aa/aa, where it is part of one word is placed as the last letter in the Danish alphabet, after the letters Æ/æ and Ø/ø, so the alphabetical order is Æ/æ,Ø/ø,Å/å- as (part of) a whole word also AA/aa (In Sweden, the order of the last 3 letters is Å/å,Ä/ä,Ö/ö, in Norway Ø/ø,Æ/æ,Å/å). So Aarhus and Århus is placed last, i.e. in a list, directory or encyclopedia in the Danish language.

- Ebeltoft
- Galten
- Gjern
- Grenaa
- Hadsten
- Hammel
- Hinnerup
- Hørning
- Langå
- Mariager
- Midtdjurs
- Nørhald
- Nørre Djurs
- Odder
- Purhus
- Randers (1970-2006)
- Rosenholm
- Rougsø
- Ry
- Rønde
- Samsø
- Silkeborg Municipality (1970-2006)
- Skanderborg Municipality (1970-2006)
- Sønderhald
- Them
- Århus

== Bornholms Amt (Bornholm County (1662-2002), seat: Rønne) ==
Bornholm County, which had existed since 1662, when it replaced Hammershus Len, was abolished as of Wednesday 1 January 2003, after the voters decided this in a referendum on the island on Tuesday May 29, 2001. This brought the number of counties down to 13, which were all abolished as of 2007. It was merged with the municipalities on the island to form one municipality, Bornholm Regional Municipality. This merger was not a part of the structural reform that merged most of Denmark's municipalities and other entities in the public sector a few years later. From 2003-2006 (4 years) it also had the responsibilities of a county, after that becoming part of Region Hovedstaden. The 5 municipalities that existed from 1970 until 2002 were:

- Aakirkeby
- Allinge-Gudhjem
- Hasle
- Nexø
- Rønne

== Frederiksberg Kommune (Frederiksberg Municipality, seat: Frederiksberg) ==
Frederiksberg Municipality was never a part of a county. Instead, it also held county privileges. But after 1 January 2007 it has lost its county privileges and is part of Region Hovedstaden.

== Frederiksborg Amt (Frederiksborg County, seat: Hillerød) ==
- Allerød (seat: Lillerød)
- Birkerød
- Farum
- Fredensborg-Humlebæk
- Frederikssund
- Frederiksværk
- Græsted-Gilleleje
- Helsinge
- Helsingør (Elsinore)
- Hillerød
- Hundested
- Hørsholm
- Jægerspris
- Karlebo
- Skibby
- Skævinge
- Slangerup
- Stenløse
- Ølstykke

== Fyns Amt (Funen County, seat: Odense) ==
- Assens Municipality
- Bogense Municipality
- Broby Municipality (seat: Nørre Broby)
- Egebjerg Municipality (seat: Ollerup)
- Ejby Municipality
- Faaborg Municipality
- Glamsbjerg Municipality
- Gudme Municipality
- Haarby Municipality
- Kerteminde Municipality
- Langeskov Municipality
- Marstal Municipality (merged with Ærøskøbing m. 1 January 2006 to form Ærø m.)
- Middelfart Municipality
- Munkebo Municipality
- Nyborg Municipality
- Nørre Aaby Municipality
- Odense Municipality
- Otterup Municipality
- Ringe Municipality
- Rudkøbing Municipality
- Ryslinge Municipality
- Svendborg Municipality
- Sydlangeland Municipality
- Søndersø Municipality
- Tommerup Municipality
- Tranekær Municipality
- Ullerslev Municipality
- Vissenbjerg Municipality
- Ærøskøbing Municipality (merged with Marstal m. 1 January 2006)
- Ørbæk Municipality
- Årslev Municipality
- Aarup Municipality

== Københavns Amt (Copenhagen County, seat: Glostrup) ==
The borders of Copenhagen County surrounded the municipalities of Copenhagen and Frederiksberg but did not include them.

- Albertslund
- Ballerup
- Brøndby
- Dragør
- Gentofte
- Gladsaxe
- Glostrup
- Herlev
- Hvidovre
- Høje-Tåstrup
- Ishøj
- Ledøje-Smørum
- Lyngby-Tårbæk (seat: Kongens Lyngby)
- Rødovre
- Søllerød
- Tårnby
- Vallensbæk
- Værløse

== Københavns Kommune (Copenhagen Municipality, seat: Copenhagen) ==
Copenhagen Municipality was not part of a county. Instead it held county privileges of its own. But these privileges were lost when the municipality became part of Region Hovedstaden January 1, 2007.

== Nordjyllands Amt (North Jutland County, seat: Aalborg) ==
- Aars
- Arden
- Brovst
- Brønderslev
- Dronninglund
- Farsø
- Fjerritslev
- Frederikshavn
- Hadsund
- Hals
- Hirtshals
- Hjørring
- Hobro
- Læsø (seat: Byrum)
- Løgstør
- Løkken-Vrå (seat: Vrå)
- Nibe
- Nørager
- Pandrup
- Sejlflod (seat: Mou)
- Sindal
- Skagen
- Skørping
- Støvring
- Sæby
- Aabybro
- Ålborg

== Ribe Amt (Ribe County) ==
- Billund
- Blåbjerg (seat: Nørre Nebel)
- Blåvandshuk (seat: Oksbøl)
- Bramming
- Brørup
- Esbjerg
- Fanø
- Grindsted
- Helle (seat: Agerbæk)
- Holsted
- Ribe
- Varde
- Vejen
- Ølgod

== Ringkjøbing Amt (Ringkjøbing County, seat: Ringkøbing) ==
- Avlum-Haderup (seat: Avlum)
- Brande
- Egvad (seat: Tarm)
- Herning Municipality
- Holmsland (seat: Hvide Sande)
- Holstebro Municipality
- Ikast
- Lemvig
- Ringkøbing
- Skjern
- Struer Municipality
- Thyborøn-Harboør (seat: Thyborøn)
- Thyholm (seat: Hvidbjerg)
- Trehøje
- Ulfborg-Vemb (seat: Ulfborg)
- Videbæk
- Vinderup
- Åskov (seat: Kibæk)

== Roskilde Amt (Roskilde County) ==
- Bramsnæs (seat: Kirke Hyllinge)
- Greve (seat: Greve Strand)
- Gundsø
- Hvalsø
- Køge
- Lejre
- Ramsø (seat: Viby)
- Roskilde
- Skovbo (seat: Borup)
- Solrød
- Vallø (seat: Hårlev)

== Storstrøms Amt (Storstrøm County, seat: Nykøbing Falster) ==
- Fakse
- Fladså (seat: Mogenstrup)
- Holeby
- Holmegård (seat: Fensmark)
- Højreby (seat: Søllested)
- Langebæk
- Maribo
- Møn (seat: Stege)
- Nakskov
- Nykøbing Falster
- Nysted
- Næstved
- Nørre Alslev
- Præstø
- Ravnsborg (seat: Horslunde)
- Rudbjerg (seat: Tillitse)
- Rødby
- Rønnede
- Sakskøbing
- Stevns (seat: Store Heddinge)
- Stubbekøbing
- Suså (seat: Glumsø)
- Sydfalster (seat: Væggerløse)
- Vordingborg

== Sønderjyllands Amt (South Jutland County, seat: Aabenraa) ==
- Augustenborg
- Bov
- Bredebro
- Broager
- Christiansfeld
- Gram
- Gråsten
- Haderslev
- Højer
- Lundtoft (seat: Kliplev)
- Løgumkloster
- Nordborg
- Nørre Rangstrup (seat: Toftlund)
- Rødding
- Rødekro
- Skærbæk
- Sundeved (seat: Avnbøl)
- Sydals (seat: Høruphav)
- Sønderborg
- Tinglev
- Tønder
- Vojens
- Aabenraa

== Vejle Amt (Vejle County) ==
- Brædstrup Municipality
- Børkop Municipality
- Egtved Municipality
- Fredericia Municipality
- Gedved Municipality
- Give Municipality
- Hedensted Municipality
- Horsens Municipality
- Jelling Municipality
- Juelsminde Municipality
- Kolding Municipality
- Lunderskov Municipality
- Nørre-Snede Municipality
- Tørring-Uldum Municipality (seat: Uldum)
- Vamdrup Municipality
- Vejle Municipality

== Vestsjællands Amt (West Zealand County, seat Sorø) ==
- Bjergsted (seat: Svebølle)
- Dianalund Municipality
- Dragsholm Municipality (seat: Fårevejle Stationsby)
- Fuglebjerg Municipality
- Gørlev Municipality
- Hashøj Municipality
- Haslev Municipality
- Holbæk Municipality
- Hvidebæk Municipality (seat: Ubby)
- Høng Municipality
- Jernløse Municipality (seat: Regstrup)
- Kalundborg Municipality
- Korsør Municipality
- Nykøbing-Rørvig Municipality (seat: Nykøbing Sjælland)
- Ringsted Municipality
- Skælskør Municipality
- Slagelse Municipality
- Sorø Municipality
- Stenlille Municipality
- Svinninge Municipality
- Tornved Municipality (seat: Jyderup)
- Trundholm Municipality (seat: Højby)
- Tølløse Municipality

== Viborg Amt (Viborg County) ==
- Bjerringbro Municipality
- Fjends Municipality (seat: Stoholm)
- Hanstholm Municipality
- Hvorslev Municipality (seat: Ulstrup)
- Karup Municipality
- Kjellerup Municipality
- Morsø Municipality (seat: Nykøbing Mors)
- Møldrup Municipality
- Sallingsund Municipality (seat: Durup)
- Skive Municipality
- Spøttrup Municipality
- Sundsøre Municipality
- Sydthy Municipality (seat: Hurup)
- Thisted Municipality
- Tjele Municipality (seat: Ørum)
- Viborg Municipality
- Aalestrup Municipality
