= 2005 Danish local elections =

- 15 November 2005
- 98 municipal councils 5 regional councils
Party	Leader	Vote %	Seats	+/–
Social Democrats	Helle Thorning-Schmidt	33.9%	900	−651
Venstre	Anders Fogh Rasmussen	27.2%	804	−862
Conservatives	Bendt Bendtsen	10.1%	257	−187
SF	Villy Søvndal	7.3%	162	−75
DPP	Pia Kjærsgaard	5.8%	125	−43
Social Liberals	Marianne Jelved	5.1%	86	−2
Red–Green	Collective leadership	2.7%	24	+13
Chr. Democrats	Bodil Kornbek	1.0%	15	−16
Schleswig Party	Gerhard Mammen	0.1%	4	−3
Other		6.6%	145	−295
This lists parties that won seats. See the complete results below.

Local elections were held in Denmark on 15 November 2005. 2522 municipal council members were elected in Denmark's 98 municipalities and 205 regional council members in the five regions. Most of these were newly formed municipalities, namely 66 municipalities, that would only begin working from Monday 1 January 2007, as would the newly formed regions, and one municipality, Ærø, which was also part of the reform, which was allowed by the government to commence work for the first time already Sunday 1 January 2006. So the first term of office in this newly created municipality was the whole period of four years from 2006 until 2009. The reform was approved 26 June 2005 by the lawmakers in the Folketing and signature by the head of state. The 238 municipal councils (Danish: kommunalbestyrelser; singular: kommunalbestyrelse) and 13 county councils that were to be abolished 1 January 2007 just continued their work one year more than the term of office (2002-2005) they were elected for until 31 December 2006 and then ceased to exist. Among the remaining 31 municipalities having their new councils elected was Bornholm Regional Municipality that was formed and began its work 1 January 2003. This was only the second time it had a new council elected, the first time being on 29 May 2002, and it was the first time its council served the whole term of office. Bornholm's merger was not a part of the reform, having been decided by the island's voters already on 29 May 2001. It was the new center-right government elected at the end of 2001 that drove the reform through parliament. The 30 municipalities that remained were not merged with other municipalities, so their newly elected councils served the whole term of office 1 January 2006 until 31 December 2009.

== Results ==
=== Results of regional elections ===
The Ministry of interior informed that voter turnout was 69.4%. The regions are not municipalities, and are not allowed to levy any taxes, but are financed only through block grants from the central government and the municipalities within each region. The results of the regional elections:

==== Number of councillors and political parties in the Regional Councils ====
Party		Seats	Change
A	Social Democrats (Socialdemokraterne)	77	▼52
V	Venstre (Venstre)	60	▼79
C	Conservative People's Party (Konservative Folkeparti)	20	▼15
O	Danish People's Party (Dansk Folkeparti)	14	▼10
F	Socialist People's Party (Socialistisk Folkeparti)	12	▼11
B	Danish Social Liberal Party (Radikale Venstre)	11	▼4
Ø	Red-Green Alliance (Enhedslisten)	6	▲4
K	Christian Democrats (Kristendemokraterne)	2	▼2
	Others	3	▲1
Total		205	▼169

=== Results of municipal elections ===
The Ministry of interior informed that voter turnout was 69.5%. The results of the municipal elections:

==== Number of councillors and political parties in the Municipal Councils ====
Sum of 98 local elections
Party		Share of vote		Seats	
Party		Percent	Change	Number	Change
A	Social Democrats (Socialdemokraterne)	33.9 %		900	▼651
V	Venstre (Venstre)	27.2 %		804	▼862
C	Conservative People's Party (Konservative Folkeparti)	10.1 %		257	▼187
F	Socialist People's Party (Socialistisk Folkeparti)	7.3 %		162	▼75
O	Danish People's Party (Dansk Folkeparti)	5.8 %		125	▼43
B	Danish Social Liberal Party (Radikale Venstre)	5.1 %		86	▼2
Ø	Red-Green Alliance (Enhedslisten)	2.7 %		24	▲13
K	Christian Democrats (Kristendemokraterne)	1.0 %		15	▼16
S	Schleswig Party (Slesvigsk Parti)	0.1%		4	▼3
	Others	6.6 %		145	▼295
Total				2,522	▼2,125

==== Mayors in the municipalities ====
The mayors (Danish:Borgmester; plural:Borgmestre) of the 98 municipalities heads the council meetings and is the chairman of the finance committee in each of their respective municipalities. Only in Copenhagen, this mayor - the head of the finance committee and council meetings - is called the Lord Mayor (Danish:Overborgmester).

Mayors after the election
Party	Number	Change
Social Democrats	46	▼36
Venstre	35	▼102
Conservative People's Party	11	▼16
Local parties	4	▼14
Danish Social Liberal Party	1	▼1
Socialist People's Party	1	▼4
Total	98	▼173

=== Old and new mayors in the municipalities ===
The term of office for the mayors elected by the majority of councillors among its members in each municipal council is the same as for the councils elected. The correct name for the municipality on the somewhat remote island of Bornholm is Regional Municipality, because the municipality also handles several tasks not carried out by the other Danish municipalities but by the regions.

Mayors outgoing and incoming
Former municipality	Incumbent mayor	Elected mayor	New municipality
Albertslund Municipality	Finn Aaberg	Finn Aaberg	Albertslund Municipality
Allerød Municipality	Eva Nejstgaard	Eva Nejstgaard	Allerød Municipality
Assens Municipality	Truels Schultz	Finn Brunse	Assens Municipality
Glamsbjerg Municipality	Ankjær Stenskrog	Finn Brunse	Assens Municipality
Haarby Municipality	Ole Møller	Finn Brunse	Assens Municipality
Tommerup Municipality	Finn Brunse	Finn Brunse	Assens Municipality
Vissenbjerg Municipality	Lene Due	Finn Brunse	Assens Municipality
Aarup Municipality	Lars Kristian Pedersen	Finn Brunse	Assens Municipality
Ballerup Municipality	Ove E. Dalsgaard	Ove E. Dalsgaard	Ballerup Municipality
Billund Municipality	Preben Jensen	Ib Kristensen	Billund Municipality
Grindsted Municipality	Ib Kristensen	Ib Kristensen	Billund Municipality
Bornholm Regional Municipality	Thomas Thors	Bjarne Kristiansen	Bornholm Regional Municipality
Brøndby Municipality	Kjeld Rasmussen	Ib Terp	Brøndby Municipality
Brønderslev Municipality	Jens Arne Hedegaard	Mikael Klitgaard	Brønderslev Municipality
Dronninglund Municipality	Mikael Klitgaard	Mikael Klitgaard	Brønderslev Municipality
Copenhagen Municipality	Lars Engberg	Ritt Bjerregaard	Copenhagen Municipality
Dragør Municipality	Asger Larsen	Allan Holst	Dragør Municipality
Ledøje-Smørum Municipality	Jens Jørgen Nygaard	Svend Kjærgaard Jensen	Egedal Municipality
Stenløse Municipality	Willy R. Eliasen	Svend Kjærgaard Jensen	Egedal Municipality
Ølstykke Municipality	Svend Kjærgaard Jensen	Svend Kjærgaard Jensen	Egedal Municipality
Bramming Municipality	Karl Kristian Knudtzen	Johnny Søtrup	Esbjerg Municipality
Esbjerg Municipality	Johnny Søtrup	Johnny Søtrup	Esbjerg Municipality
Ribe Municipality	Preben Rudiengaard	Johnny Søtrup	Esbjerg Municipality
Fanø Municipality	Kjeld Nielsen	Erik Nørreby	Fanø Municipality
Hadsten Municipality	Anders G. Christensen	Anders G. Christensen	Favrskov Municipality
Hammel Municipality	Ole Brøkner	Anders G. Christensen	Favrskov Municipality
Hinnerup Municipality	Niels Berg	Anders G. Christensen	Favrskov Municipality
Hadsten Municipality	Kurt Andreassen	Anders G. Christensen	Favrskov Municipality
Fakse Municipality	René Tuekær	René Tuekær	Faxe Municipality
Haslev Municipality	Henrik Christensen	René Tuekær	Faxe Municipality
Rønnede Municipality	Svend Thorsen	René Tuekær	Faxe Municipality
Fredensborg-Humlebæk Municipality	John Hemming	Olav Aaen	Fredensborg Municipality
Karlebo Municipality	Olav Aaen	Olav Aaen	Fredensborg Municipality
Fredericia Municipality	Uffe Steiner Jensen	Uffe Steiner Jensen	Fredericia Municipality
Frederiksberg Municipality	Mads Lebech	Mads Lebech	Frederiksberg Municipality
Frederikshavn Municipality	Erik Sørensen	Erik Sørensen	Frederikshavn Municipality
Skagen Municipality	Hans Rex Christensen	Erik Sørensen	Frederikshavn Municipality
Sæby Municipality	Folmer Hansen	Erik Sørensen	Frederikshavn Municipality
Frederikssund Municipality	Knud B. Christoffersen	Ole Find Jensen	Frederikssund Municipality
Jægerspris Municipality	Ole Find Jensen	Ole Find Jensen	Frederikssund Municipality
Skibby Municipality	Hans Henning Bjørnsen	Ole Find Jensen	Frederikssund Municipality
Slangerup Municipality	Bent Lund	Ole Find Jensen	Frederikssund Municipality
Farum Municipality	Lars Carpens	Jesper Bach	Furesø Municipality
Værløse Municipality	Jesper Bach	Jesper Bach	Furesø Municipality
Broby Municipality	Erling Bonnesen	Bo Andersen	Faaborg-Midtfyn Municipality
Faaborg Municipality	Britta Duelund	Bo Andersen	Faaborg-Midtfyn Municipality
Ringe Municipality	Bo Andersen	Bo Andersen	Faaborg-Midtfyn Municipality
Ryslinge Municipality	Gunnar Landtved	Bo Andersen	Faaborg-Midtfyn Municipality
Årslev Municipality	Hans Jørgensen	Bo Andersen	Faaborg-Midtfyn Municipality
Gentofte Municipality	Hans Toft	Hans Toft	Gentofte Municipality
Gladsaxe Municipality	Karin Søjberg Holst	Karin Søjberg Holst	Gladsaxe Municipality
Glostrup Municipality	Søren Enemark	Søren Enemark	Glostrup Municipality
Greve Municipality	René Milo	Hans Barlach	Greve Municipality
Græsted-Gilleleje Municipality	Jannich Petersen	Jannich Petersen	Gribskov Municipality
Helsinge Municipality	Claus Lange	Jannich Petersen	Gribskov Municipality
Nykøbing Falster Municipality	Poul-Henrik Pedersen	Kaj Petersen	Guldborgsund Municipality
Nysted Municipality	Lennart Damsbo-Andersen	Kaj Petersen	Guldborgsund Municipality
Nørre-Alslev Municipality	Niels Larsen	Kaj Petersen	Guldborgsund Municipality
Sakskøbing Municipality	Kaj Petersen	Kaj Petersen	Guldborgsund Municipality
Stubbekøbing Municipality	Ole Bronné Sørensen	Kaj Petersen	Guldborgsund Municipality
Sydfalster Municipality	Hans Aage Pedersen	Kaj Petersen	Guldborgsund Municipality
Gram Municipality	H.P. Geil	H.P. Geil	Haderslev Municipality
Haderslev Municipality	Jens Christian Gjesing	H.P. Geil	Haderslev Municipality
Vojens Municipality	Nis Mikkelsen	H.P. Geil	Haderslev Municipality
Frederiksværk Municipality	Helge Friis	Helge Friis	Halsnæs Municipality
Hundested Municipality	Hans Schwennesen	Helge Friis	Halsnæs Municipality
Hedensted Municipality	Jørn Juhl Nielsen	Jørn Juhl Nielsen	Hedensted Municipality
Juelsminde Municipality	Peter Schmidt Hansen	Jørn Juhl Nielsen	Hedensted Municipality
Tørring-Uldum Municipality	Kirsten Terkilsen	Jørn Juhl Nielsen	Hedensted Municipality
Helsingør Municipality	Per Tærsbøl	Per Tærsbøl	Helsingør Municipality
Herlev Municipality	Kjeld Hansen	Kjeld Hansen	Herlev Municipality
Aulum-Haderup Municipality	Christen Dam Larsen	Lars Krarup	Herning Municipality
Herning Municipality	Lars Krarup	Lars Krarup	Herning Municipality
Trehøje Municipality	Svend Blæsbjerg	Lars Krarup	Herning Municipality
Aaskov Municipality	Jørgen Christian Jørgensen	Lars Krarup	Herning Municipality
Hillerød Municipality	Nick Hækkerup	Nick Hækkerup	Hillerød Municipality
Skævinge Municipality	Ole Roed Jakobsen	Nick Hækkerup	Hillerød Municipality
Hirtshals Municipality	Knud Størup	Finn Olesen	Hjørring Municipality
Hjørring Municipality	Bent Brown	Finn Olesen	Hjørring Municipality
Løkken-Vrå Municipality	Knud Rødbro	Finn Olesen	Hjørring Municipality
Sindal Municipality	Søren Risager	Finn Olesen	Hjørring Municipality
Holbæk Municipality	Jørn Sørensen	Jørn Sørensen	Holbæk Municipality
Jernløse Municipality	Annica Granstrøm	Jørn Sørensen	Holbæk Municipality
Svinninge Municipality	Søren Christensen	Jørn Sørensen	Holbæk Municipality
Tornved Municipality	Jens Stenbæk	Jørn Sørensen	Holbæk Municipality
Tølløse Municipality	Poul Erik Jensen	Jørn Sørensen	Holbæk Municipality
Holstebro Municipality	Arne Lægaard	Arne Lægaard	Holstebro Municipality
Ulfborg-Vemb Municipality	Niels Kristian Jensen	Arne Lægaard	Holstebro Municipality
Vinderup Municipality	Holger Hedegaard	Arne Lægaard	Holstebro Municipality
Brædstrup Municipality	Torkild Skifter	Jan Trøjborg	Horsens Municipality
Gedved Municipality	Ejgil W. Rasmussen	Jan Trøjborg	Horsens Municipality
Horsens Municipality	Vagn Ry Nielsen	Jan Trøjborg	Horsens Municipality
Hvidovre Municipality	Britta Christensen	Britta Christensen	Hvidovre Municipality
Høje-Taastrup Municipality	Anders Bak	Michael Ziegler	Høje-Taastrup Municipality
Hørsholm Municipality	Uffe Thorndal	Uffe Thorndal	Hørsholm Municipality
Brande Municipality	Preben H. Christensen	Carsten Kissmeyer	Ikast-Brande Municipality
Ikast Municipality	Carsten Kissmeyer	Carsten Kissmeyer	Ikast-Brande Municipality
Nørre-Snede Municipality	Uffe Henneberg	Carsten Kissmeyer	Ikast-Brande Municipality
Ishøj Municipality	Ole Bjørstorp	Ole Bjørstorp	Ishøj Municipality
Brovst Municipality	Mogens Gade	Mogens Gade	Jammerbugt Municipality
Fjerritslev Municipality	Otto Kjær Larsen	Mogens Gade	Jammerbugt Municipality
Pandrup Municipality	Flemming Jansen	Mogens Gade	Jammerbugt Municipality
Aabybro Municipality	Ole Lykkegaard Andersen	Mogens Gade	Jammerbugt Municipality
Bjergsted Municipality	Gert Larsen	Tommy Dinesen	Kalundborg Municipality
Gørlev Municipality	Jørgen Arnam-Olsen	Tommy Dinesen	Kalundborg Municipality
Hvidebæk Municipality	Henning Fougt	Tommy Dinesen	Kalundborg Municipality
Høng Municipality	Ingvar Jensen	Tommy Dinesen	Kalundborg Municipality
Kalundborg Municipality	Tommy Dinesen	Tommy Dinesen	Kalundborg Municipality
Kerteminde Municipality	Else Møller	Palle Hansborg-Sørensen	Kerteminde Municipality
Langeskov Municipality	Ejvind Høyer Nielsen	Palle Hansborg-Sørensen	Kerteminde Municipality
Munkebo Municipality	Palle Hansborg-Sørensen	Palle Hansborg-Sørensen	Kerteminde Municipality
Christiansfeld Municipality	Jørgen F. From	Per Bødker Andersen	Kolding Municipality
Kolding Municipality	Per Bødker Andersen	Per Bødker Andersen	Kolding Municipality
Lunderskov Municipality	Hans Peter Andersen	Per Bødker Andersen	Kolding Municipality
Vamdrup Municipality	Mike Legarth	Per Bødker Andersen	Kolding Municipality
Køge Municipality	Torben Hansen	Marie Stærke	Køge Municipality
Skovbo Municipality	Ole Hansen	Marie Stærke	Køge Municipality
Rudkøbing Municipality	Johan Norden	Knud Gether	Langeland Municipality
Sydlangeland Municipality	Knud Gether	Knud Gether	Langeland Municipality
Tranekær Municipality	Jørgen Nielsen	Knud Gether	Langeland Municipality
Bramsnæs Municipality	Flemming Jensen	Flemming Jensen	Lejre Municipality
Hvalsø Municipality	Virginia Holst	Flemming Jensen	Lejre Municipality
Lejre Municipality	Jens Hald Madsen	Flemming Jensen	Lejre Municipality
Lemvig Municipality	Jørgen Nørby	Erik Flyvholm	Lemvig Municipality
Thyborøn-Harboøre Municipality	Erik Flyvholm	Erik Flyvholm	Lemvig Municipality
Holeby Municipality	Bjarne Larsen	Stig Vestergaard	Lolland Municipality
Højreby Municipality	Jytte Krag-Juel-Vind-Frijs	Stig Vestergaard	Lolland Municipality
Maribo Municipality	Liljan Køcks	Stig Vestergaard	Lolland Municipality
Nakskov Municipality	Flemming Bonne Hansen	Stig Vestergaard	Lolland Municipality
Ravnsborg Municipality	Stig Vestergaard	Stig Vestergaard	Lolland Municipality
Rudbjerg Municipality	Tom Larsen	Stig Vestergaard	Lolland Municipality
Rødby Municipality	Hans Ole Sørensen	Stig Vestergaard	Lolland Municipality
Lyngby-Taarbæk Municipality	Rolf Aagaard-Svendsen	Rolf Aagaard-Svendsen	Lyngby-Taarbæk Municipality
Læsø Municipality	Olav Juul Gaarn Larsen	Olav Juul Gaarn Larsen	Læsø Municipality
Arden Municipality	Hans Christian Maarup	Hans Christian Maarup	Mariagerfjord Municipality
Hadsund Municipality	Karl Christensen	Hans Christian Maarup	Mariagerfjord Municipality
Hobro Municipality	Jørgen Pontoppidan	Hans Christian Maarup	Mariagerfjord Municipality
Mariager Municipality	Erik Kirkegaard Mikkelsen	Hans Christian Maarup	Mariagerfjord Municipality
Ejby Municipality	Claus Hansen	Steen Dahlstrøm	Middelfart Municipality
Middelfart Municipality	Steen Dahlstrøm	Steen Dahlstrøm	Middelfart Municipality
Nørre Aaby Municipality	Hanne R. Christensen	Steen Dahlstrøm	Middelfart Municipality
Morsø Municipality	Egon Plejdrup Poulsen	Egon Plejdrup Poulsen	Morsø Municipality
Grenaa Municipality	Gert Schou	Torben Jensen	Norddjurs Municipality
Nørre Djurs Municipality	Jens Peter Jellesen	Torben Jensen	Norddjurs Municipality
Rougsø Municipality	Torben Jensen	Torben Jensen	Norddjurs Municipality
Bogense Municipality	Arne Kruse	Bent Dyssemark	Nordfyn Municipality
Otterup Municipality	Bent Dyssemark	Bent Dyssemark	Nordfyn Municipality
Søndersø Municipality	Erik Hansen	Bent Dyssemark	Nordfyn Municipality
Nyborg Municipality	Jørn Terndrup	Jørn Terndrup	Nyborg Municipality
Ullerslev Municipality	Erik Skov Christensen	Jørn Terndrup	Nyborg Municipality
Ørbæk Municipality	Kaj Refslund	Jørn Terndrup	Nyborg Municipality
Fladså Municipality	Hans R. Hansen	Henning Jensen	Næstved Municipality
Holmegaard Municipality	Søren Dysted	Henning Jensen	Næstved Municipality
Næstved Municipality	Henning Jensen	Henning Jensen	Næstved Municipality
Suså Municipality	Poul Erik Sørensen	Henning Jensen	Næstved Municipality
Fuglebjerg Municipality	Henrik Willadsen	Henning Jensen	Næstved Municipality
Odder Municipality	Elvin J. Hansen	Niels-Ulrik Bugge	Odder Municipality
Odense Municipality	Anker Boye	Jan Boye	Odense Municipality
Dragsholm Municipality	Finn Madsen	Finn Madsen	Odsherred Municipality
Nykøbing-Rørvig Municipality	Vagn Ytte Larsen	Finn Madsen	Odsherred Municipality
Trundholm Municipality	Hans Møller Olsen	Finn Madsen	Odsherred Municipality
Langå Municipality	Hanne Nielsen	Henning Jensen Nyhuus	Randers Municipality
Nørhald Municipality	Anders Buhl-Christensen	Henning Jensen Nyhuus	Randers Municipality
Purhus Municipality	Berner Nielsen	Henning Jensen Nyhuus	Randers Municipality
Randers Municipality	Michael Aastrup Jensen	Henning Jensen Nyhuus	Randers Municipality
Sønderhald Municipality	Kirsten Wyrtz	Henning Jensen Nyhuus	Randers Municipality
Nørager Municipality	Poul Larsen	Anny Winther	Rebild Municipality
Skørping Municipality	Børge Olsen	Anny Winther	Rebild Municipality
Støvring Municipality	Anny Winther	Anny Winther	Rebild Municipality
Egvad Municipality	Kent Skaanning	Torben Nørregaard	Ringkøbing-Skjern Municipality
Holmsland Municipality	Iver Enevoldsen	Torben Nørregaard	Ringkøbing-Skjern Municipality
Ringkøbing Municipality	Hans Østergård	Torben Nørregaard	Ringkøbing-Skjern Municipality
Skjern Municipality	Viggo Nielsen	Torben Nørregaard	Ringkøbing-Skjern Municipality
Videbæk Municipality	Torben Nørregaard	Torben Nørregaard	Ringkøbing-Skjern Municipality
Ringsted Municipality	Benny Christensen	Niels Ulrich Hermansen	Ringsted Municipality
Gundsø Municipality	Evan Lynnerup	Poul Lindor Nielsen	Roskilde Municipality
Ramsø Municipality	Poul Lindor Nielsen	Poul Lindor Nielsen	Roskilde Municipality
Roskilde Municipality	Bjørn Dahl	Poul Lindor Nielsen	Roskilde Municipality
Birkerød Municipality	Ove C. Alminde	Erik Fabrin	Rudersdal Municipality
Søllerød Municipality	Erik Fabrin	Erik Fabrin	Rudersdal Municipality
Rødovre Municipality	Erik Nielsen	Erik Nielsen	Rødovre Municipality
Samsø Municipality	Carsten Bruun	Carsten Bruun	Samsø Municipality
Kjellerup Municipality	Hans-Jørgen Hørning	Jens Erik Jørgensen	Silkeborg Municipality
Gjern Municipality	Ella Porskær	Jens Erik Jørgensen	Silkeborg Municipality
Silkeborg Municipality	Jens Erik Jørgensen	Jens Erik Jørgensen	Silkeborg Municipality
Them Municipality	Torben Hansen	Jens Erik Jørgensen	Silkeborg Municipality
Galten Municipality	Jens Grønlund	Jens Grønlund	Skanderborg Municipality
Hørning Municipality	Søren Erik Pedersen	Jens Grønlund	Skanderborg Municipality
Ry Municipality	Jonna Grønver	Jens Grønlund	Skanderborg Municipality
Skanderborg Municipality	Aleksander Aagaard	Jens Grønlund	Skanderborg Municipality
Sallingsund Municipality	Jens Jørn Justesen	Flemming Eskildsen	Skive Municipality
Skive Municipality	Per B. Jeppesen	Flemming Eskildsen	Skive Municipality
Spøttrup Municipality	Peder Christensen	Flemming Eskildsen	Skive Municipality
Sundsøre Municipality	Flemming Eskildsen	Flemming Eskildsen	Skive Municipality
Hashøj Municipality	Troels Christensen	Lis Tribler	Slagelse Municipality
Korsør Municipality	Flemming Erichsen	Lis Tribler	Slagelse Municipality
Skælskør Municipality	Hans Ole Drost	Lis Tribler	Slagelse Municipality
Slagelse Municipality	Lis Tribler	Lis Tribler	Slagelse Municipality
Solrød Municipality	Merete Wiid	Niels Emil Hörup	Solrød Municipality
Dianalund Municipality	Per Hovmand	Ivan Hansen	Sorø Municipality
Sorø Municipality	Ivan Hansen	Ivan Hansen	Sorø Municipality
Stenlille Municipality	Vagn Guldborg	Ivan Hansen	Sorø Municipality
Stevns Municipality	Lars P. Asserhøj	Poul Arne Nielsen	Stevns Municipality
Vallø Municipality	Poul Arne Nielsen	Poul Arne Nielsen	Stevns Municipality
Struer Municipality	Niels Viggo Lynghøj	Martin Merrild	Struer Municipality
Thyholm Municipality	Peter Gade	Martin Merrild	Struer Municipality
Egebjerg Municipality	Mogens Johansen	Lars Erik Hornemann	Svendborg Municipality
Gudme Municipality	Lars Erik Hornemann	Lars Erik Hornemann	Svendborg Municipality
Svendborg Municipality	Jørgen Henningsen	Lars Erik Hornemann	Svendborg Municipality
Ebeltoft Municipality	Jørgen Brøgger	Vilfred Friborg Hansen	Syddjurs Municipality
Midtdjurs Municipality	Kim Dalgaard Poulsen	Vilfred Friborg Hansen	Syddjurs Municipality
Rosenholm Municipality	Richard Volander	Vilfred Friborg Hansen	Syddjurs Municipality
Rønde Municipality	Vilfred Friborg Hansen	Vilfred Friborg Hansen	Syddjurs Municipality
Augustenborg Municipality	Aase Nyegaard	Jan Prokopek Jensen	Sønderborg Municipality
Broager Municipality	Jørn Lehmann Petersen	Jan Prokopek Jensen	Sønderborg Municipality
Gråsten Municipality	Bendt Olesen	Jan Prokopek Jensen	Sønderborg Municipality
Nordborg Municipality	Jan Prokopek Jensen	Jan Prokopek Jensen	Sønderborg Municipality
Sundeved Municipality	John Solkær Pedersen	Jan Prokopek Jensen	Sønderborg Municipality
Sydals Municipality	Jens Peter Kock	Jan Prokopek Jensen	Sønderborg Municipality
Sønderborg Municipality	A. P. Hansen	Jan Prokopek Jensen	Sønderborg Municipality
Hanstholm Municipality	Ejner Frøkjær	Erik Hove Olesen	Thisted Municipality
Sydthy Municipality	Arne Hyldahl	Erik Hove Olesen	Thisted Municipality
Thisted Municipality	Erik Hove Olesen	Erik Hove Olesen	Thisted Municipality
Bredebro Municipality	Vagn Therkel Pedersen	Vagn Therkel Pedersen	Tønder Municipality
Højer Municipality	Peter Christensen	Vagn Therkel Pedersen	Tønder Municipality
Løgumkloster Municipality	Kaj Armann	Vagn Therkel Pedersen	Tønder Municipality
Nørre-Rangstrup Municipality	Ole Østvig Nissen	Vagn Therkel Pedersen	Tønder Municipality
Skærbæk Municipality	Svend Ole Gammelgård	Vagn Therkel Pedersen	Tønder Municipality
Tønder Municipality	Hans L. Hansen	Vagn Therkel Pedersen	Tønder Municipality
Tårnby Municipality	Henrik Zimino	Henrik Zimino	Tårnby Municipality
Vallensbæk Municipality	Kurt Hockerup	Kurt Hockerup	Vallensbæk Municipality
Blaabjerg Municipality	Preben Olesen	Gylling Haahr	Varde Municipality
Blåvandshuk Municipality	Hans Christian Thoning	Gylling Haahr	Varde Municipality
Helle Municipality	Gylling Haahr	Gylling Haahr	Varde Municipality
Varde Municipality	Kaj Nielsen	Gylling Haahr	Varde Municipality
Ølgod Municipality	Erik Buhl Nielsen	Gylling Haahr	Varde Municipality
Brørup Municipality	Egon Fræhr	Egon Fræhr	Vejen Municipality
Holsted Municipality	Carl Aaskov	Egon Fræhr	Vejen Municipality
Vejen Municipality	Regnar Busk	Egon Fræhr	Vejen Municipality
Rødding Municipality	Tage Sørensen	Egon Fræhr	Vejen Municipality
Børkop Municipality	Leif Skov	Leif Skov	Vejle Municipality
Egtved Municipality	Sonny Berthold	Leif Skov	Vejle Municipality
Give Municipality	Villy Dahl Johansen	Leif Skov	Vejle Municipality
Jelling Municipality	Arne Sigtenbjerggaard	Leif Skov	Vejle Municipality
Vejle Municipality	Karen Delfs	Leif Skov	Vejle Municipality
Farsø Municipality	H. O. A. Kjeldsen	Jens Styrbæk Lauritzen	Vesthimmerland Municipality
Løgstør Municipality	Jens Styrbæk Lauritzen	Jens Styrbæk Lauritzen	Vesthimmerland Municipality
Aalestrup Municipality	Rigmor Sandborg	Jens Styrbæk Lauritzen	Vesthimmerland Municipality
Aars Municipality	Knud Kristensen	Jens Styrbæk Lauritzen	Vesthimmerland Municipality
Bjerringbro Municipality	Poul Vesterbæk	Johannes Stensgaard	Viborg Municipality
Fjends Municipality	Svend Aage Jensen	Johannes Stensgaard	Viborg Municipality
Karup Municipality	Kjeld Merstrand	Johannes Stensgaard	Viborg Municipality
Møldrup Municipality	Gunnar Korsbæk	Johannes Stensgaard	Viborg Municipality
Tjele Municipality	Anna Magrethe Kaalund	Johannes Stensgaard	Viborg Municipality
Viborg Municipality	Johannes Stensgaard	Johannes Stensgaard	Viborg Municipality
Langebæk Municipality	Henrik Holmer	Henrik Holmer	Vordingborg Municipality
Møn Municipality	Knud Larsen	Henrik Holmer	Vordingborg Municipality
Præstø Municipality	Ole Møller Madsen	Henrik Holmer	Vordingborg Municipality
Vordingborg Municipality	Bent Pedersen	Henrik Holmer	Vordingborg Municipality
Marstal Municipality	Karsten Landro	Jørgen Otto Jørgensen	Ærø Municipality
Ærøskøbing Municipality	Jørgen Otto Jørgensen	Jørgen Otto Jørgensen	Ærø Municipality
Bov Municipality	Jens Aage Helmig	Tove Larsen	Aabenraa Municipality
Lundtoft Municipality	Hans Philip Tietje	Tove Larsen	Aabenraa Municipality
Rødekro Municipality	Tove Larsen	Tove Larsen	Aabenraa Municipality
Tinglev Municipality	Susanne Beier	Tove Larsen	Aabenraa Municipality
Aabenraa Municipality	Poul Thomsen	Tove Larsen	Aabenraa Municipality
Hals Municipality	Bent Sørensen	Henning G. Jensen	Aalborg Municipality
Nibe Municipality	Jens Østergaard Madsen	Henning G. Jensen	Aalborg Municipality
Sejlflod Municipality	Kristian Schnoor	Henning G. Jensen	Aalborg Municipality
Aalborg Municipality	Henning G. Jensen	Henning G. Jensen	Aalborg Municipality
Aarhus Municipality	Louise Gade	Nicolai Wammen	Aarhus Municipality
