= Jane Heitmann =

Danish politician (born 1968)

Member of the Folketing
- Incumbent
- Assumed office 15 September 2011
- Constituency: Funen

Personal details
- Born: 5 November 1968 (age 57) Copenhagen, Denmark
- Party: Venstre

Jane Vallebo Thorngaard Heitmann (born 5 November 1968 in Copenhagen) is a Danish politician, who is a member of the Folketing for the Venstre political party. She was elected into parliament at the 2011 Danish general election. On 2 June 2023, she was elected as president of Krifa, a Danish unemployment insurance fund and trade union.

== Political career ==
Heitmann was in the municipal council of Faaborg Municipality from 2006 and until 2007 where it was merged with the municipalities of Broby, Ringe, Ryslinge and Årslev to form the new Faaborg-Midtfyn Municipality. She sat in the municipal council in this new municipality from its foundation in 2007 and until 2017, where local political Ole Pedersen took over her seat.

Heitmann was first elected into the Folketing at the 2011 election, where she received 4,196 votes. She was reelected in 2015 with 4,677 votes and in 2019 with 4,420 votes.
