= Erling Bonnesen =

Danish politician

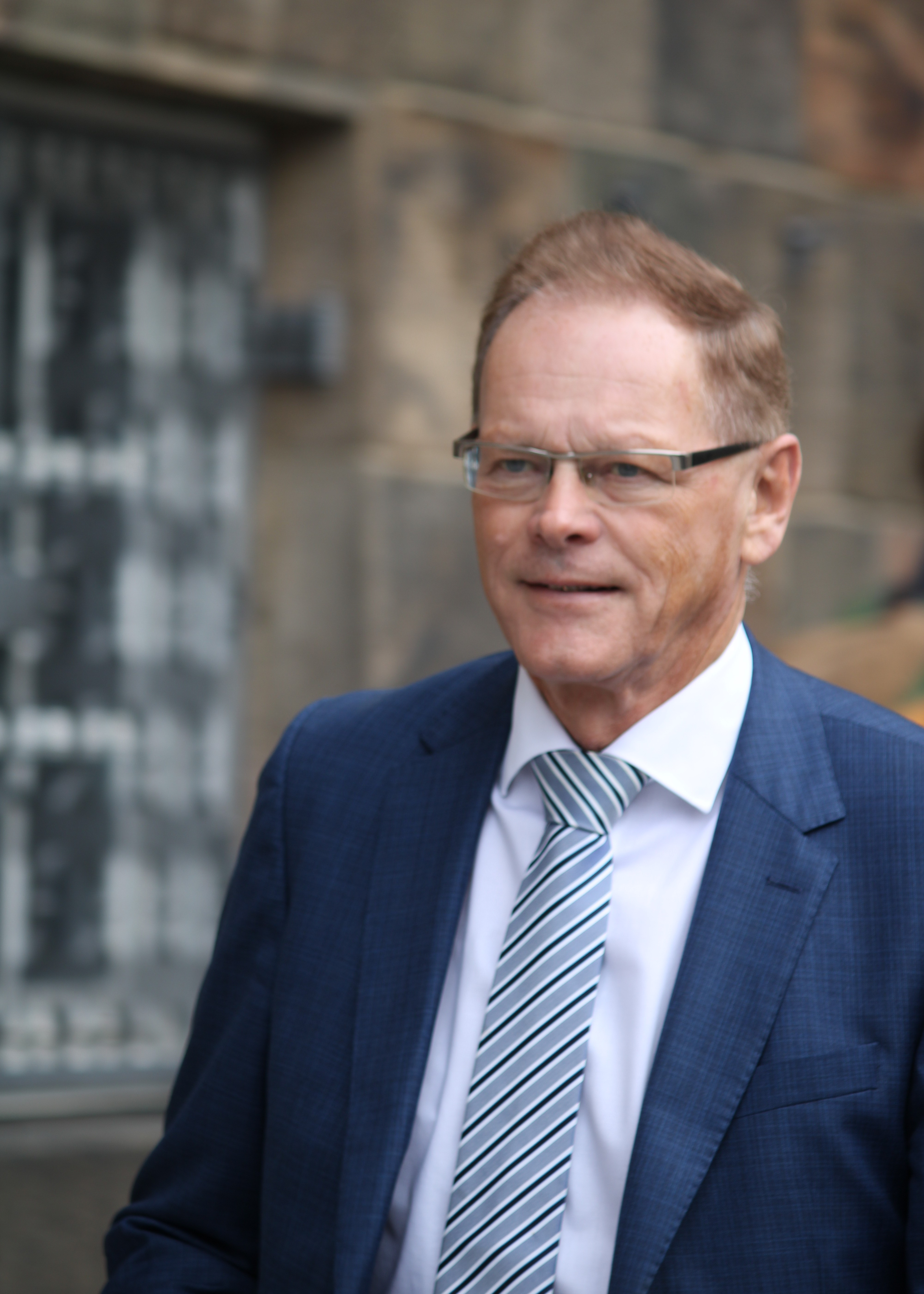
- Bonnesen in 2025

Member of the Folketing
- Incumbent
- Assumed office 7 October 2004
- Constituency: Funen

Mayor of Broby Municipality
- In office 1994–2007
- Preceded by: Jens Otto Schepelern (A)
- Succeeded by: None

Personal details
- Born: 28 March 1955 (age 71) Nørre Broby, Denmark
- Party: Venstre

Erling Bonnesen (born 28 March 1955) is a Danish politician, who is a member of the Folketing for the Venstre political party. He entered parliament in 2004 after Mariann Fischer Boel resigned her seat.

== Political career ==
Bonnesen was the mayor of Broby Municipality from 1994 until the municipality was merged with Faaborg, Ringe, Ryslinge and Årslev Municipality in 2007.

Bonnesen first ran for parliament in the 2001 Danish general election. While he wasn't elected into parliament, he became the primary substitute. When Mariann Fischer Boel then resigned her seat during the 2001-2005 term, on 7 October 2004, Bonnesen entered parliament in her place.

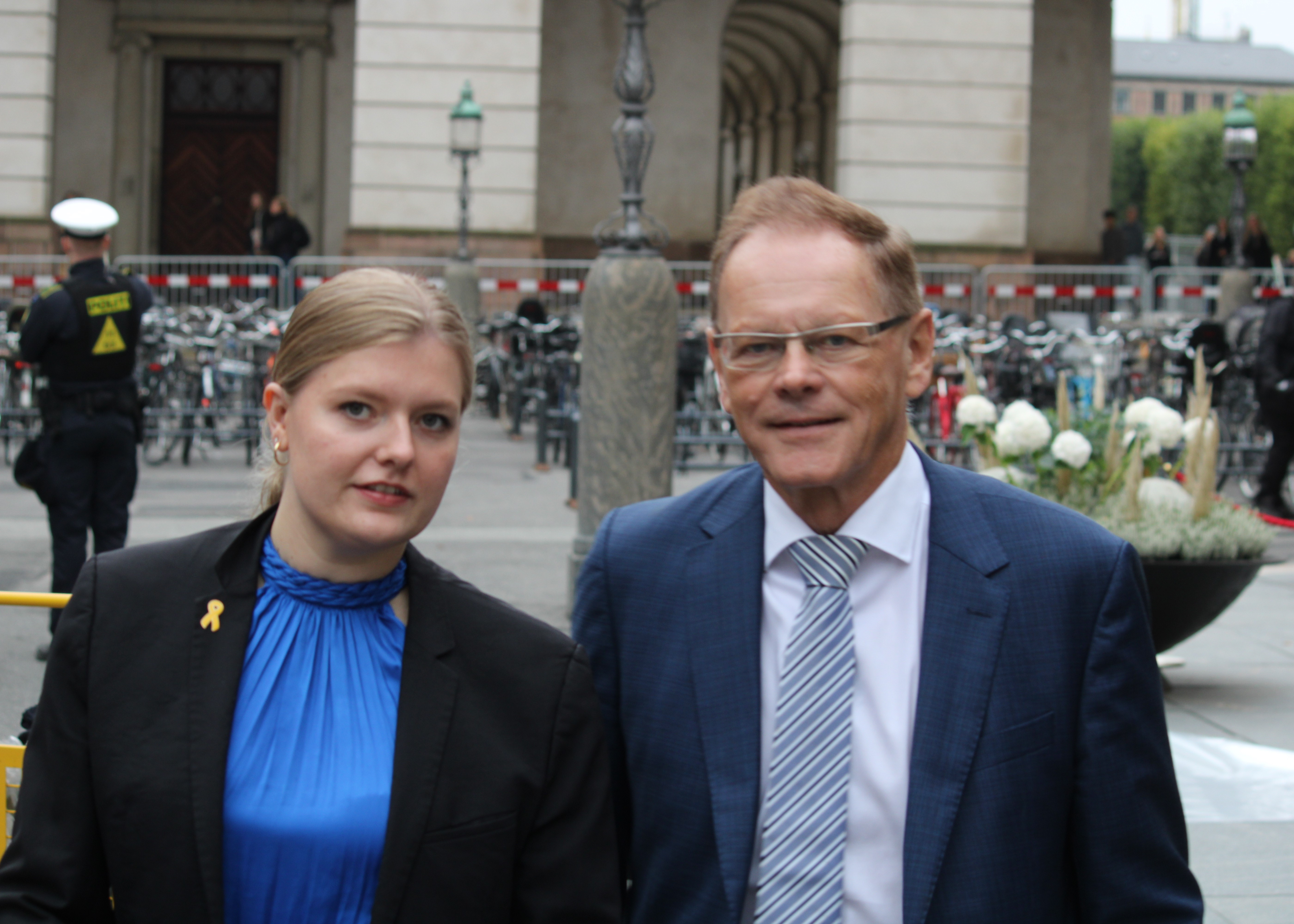
Bonnesen at the 2025 opening of the Danish parliament

He was elected directly into parliament in the 2005 Danish general election and again in the 2007 election, where he received 9,436 votes. He was reelected in 2011 with 7,819 votes, 2015 with 9,034 votes and 2019 with 8,522 votes.
