= Aarup Municipality =

Former municipality of Denmark

Coordinates: 55.374277°N 10.058192°E

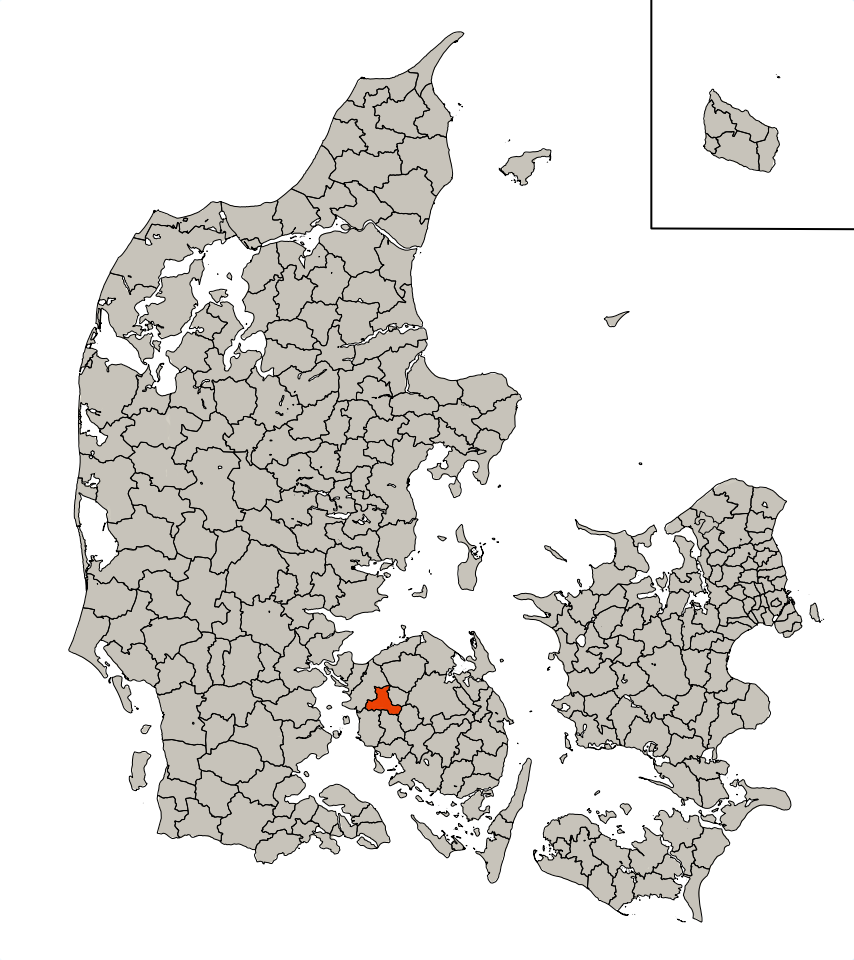
Aarup Municipality's location in Denmark.

Before The Municipality Reform of 2007, Aarup was a municipality (Danish, kommune) in Fyns Amt on the island of Funen in central Denmark. The municipality covered an area of 81 km^{2}, and had a total population of 5,480 (2005). Its latest mayor was Lars Kristian Pedersen, a member of the Venstre (Liberal) party.

The municipality's main city and the site of its municipal council was the town of Aarup, located just off the E20 between the cities of Odense and Middelfart.

The municipality was established in 1966 by combining previously existing Skydebjerg-Orte, Rørup, and Kerte municipalities. Aarup municipality's coat-of-arms was that of the former Rørup municipality, as none of the other municipalities had one at the time of their merger. The coat-of-arms was registered in 1942 (Rørup) and again in 1973 (Aarup).

On 1 January 2007, the municipality ceased to exist and was merged with the former Assens, Glamsbjerg, Haarby, Tommerup, and Vissenbjerg municipalities to form the new Assens municipality. This created a municipality with an area of 513 km^{2} and a total population of 41,201 (2005). The new municipality belongs to the Region of Southern Denmark.
