= Funen County =

Funen County Fyns Amt (Danish)
- County of Denmark
- Coat of arms

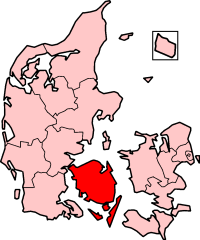
- Funen County in Denmark
- Coordinates: 55°22′52″N 10°26′07″E
- Seat: Odense

Area
  - Total: 3,486 km^{2} (1,346 sq mi)

Population (2006)
  - Total: 478,347
  - Density: 137.2/km^{2} (355.4/sq mi)

Funen County (Danish: Fyns Amt) is a former county (Danish: amt) in central Denmark, comprising the islands of Funen, Langeland, Tåsinge, Ærø, and approximately 90 other islands, of which only 25 are inhabited. The county was formed on 1 April 1970, comprising the former counties of Odense and Svendborg. The county was abolished from 1 January 2007, when it merged into Region of Southern Denmark (Region Syddanmark).

The county employed around 20,000 people working in more than 160 institutions located all over Funen.

== Insignia ==
Funen County's coat of arms showed three connected gold hop leaves on a field of red, representing three former counties of Odense, Svendborg and Assens. The choice of hop leaves comes from Funen native Hans Christian Andersen's song "I Danmark er jeg født" ("In Denmark I was born"), where he refers to Funen as "Æblegård og humlehave" (Apple farm and hop garden).

For common daily usage, a more modern and IT-friendly version was used. In this version, the background was green and the hop leaves white and much less detailed. Previous versions had a red or, on occasion, a black background.

The coat of arms was registered in 1976.

== List of County Mayors ==
From	To	County Mayor
1 April 1970	1974	Edvard Rasmussen (Social Liberal)
1974	1993	Jens Peter Fisker (Social Democrat)
1993	2001	Karen Nøhr (Social Liberal)
2001	2005	Jan Boye (Conservative)
2 January 2006	31 December 2006	Poul Weber (Venstre)

== Municipalities (1970-2006) ==
- Assens Municipality
- Bogense Municipality
- Broby Municipality
- Egebjerg Municipality
- Ejby Municipality
- Faaborg Municipality
- Glamsbjerg Municipality
- Gudme Municipality
- Haarby Municipality
- Kerteminde Municipality
- Langeskov Municipality
- Middelfart Municipality
- Munkebo municipality
- Nyborg Municipality
- Nørre Aaby Municipality
- Odense Municipality
- Otterup Municipality
- Ringe Municipality
- Rudkøbing Municipality
- Ryslinge Municipality
- Svendborg Municipality
- Sydlangeland Municipality
- Søndersø Municipality
- Tommerup Municipality
- Tranekær Municipality
- Ullerslev Municipality
- Vissenbjerg Municipality
- Ørbæk Municipality
- Ærø Municipality (formed 1 January 2006, a merger between Marstal and Ærøskøbing)
- Årslev Municipality
- Aarup Municipality

== Municipal reform in 2006/2007 ==
On 1 January 2007, The Danish Municipal Reform replaced the traditional counties with five new regions and cut the number of municipalities to 98. Funen county is included in the new Region Syddanmark (Region South Denmark). The 32 municipalities within Funen County were reduced to 10.

- Assens municipality - Aarup, Assens, Glamsbjerg, Haarby, Tommerup, and Vissenbjerg
- Faaborg-Midtfyn municipality - Årslev, Broby, Faaborg, Ringe, and Ryslinge
- Kerteminde municipality - Kerteminde, Langeskov, and Munkebo
- Langeland municipality - Rudkøbing, Sydlangeland, and Tranekær
- Middelfart municipality - Ejby, Middelfart, and Nørre Aaby
- Odense municipality (unchanged by the reform)
- Nordfyn municipality - Bogense, Otterup, and Søndersø
- Nyborg municipality - Nyborg, Ullerslev, and Ørbæk
- Svendborg municipality - Egebjerg, Gudme, and Svendborg
- Ærø municipality (formed 1 January 2006, a merger between Marstal and Ærøskøbing)

== Important former municipalities ==
- Marstal municipality (1970-2005)
- Ærøskøbing municipality (1970-2005)
