= Poul Weber =

Danish politician

Poul Weber (born 30 December 1949) is a Danish politician, representing the Liberal party Venstre. He served as the last County Mayor of Funen County. As from 1 January 2007, Funen forms part of Region Syddanmark.

Weber became County Mayor after this predecessor, Jan Boye, was elected Mayor of Odense in the Danish municipal elections of 15 November 2005. In the same election Weber ran for a seat in the Region Council of Region Syddanmark, where he was elected with a total of 8,011 votes. He previously served as Mayor of Egebjerg municipality, 1989–2001.

Weber is married and the father of three children. He has worked in the construction business and is a fruit grower by profession.

Political offices
Preceded by Jan Boye	County Mayor of Funen; 2 January 2006 – 31 December 2006	Succeeded by Office abolished. Funen merged into Region Syddanmark.
