= Haarby =

- Village
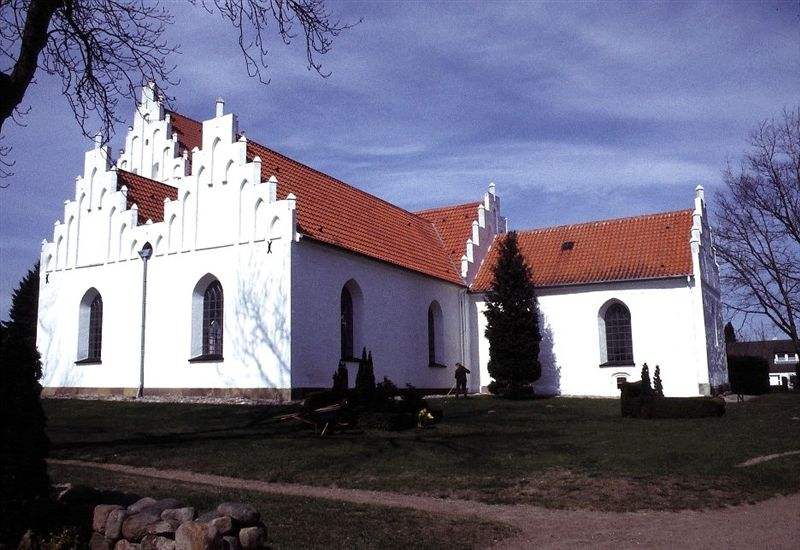
- Haarby Church, 2006

- Location in Denmark Haarby (Region of Southern Denmark)
- Coordinates: 55°13′18″N 10°7′21″E
- Country: Denmark
- Region: Southern Denmark (Syddanmark)
- Municipality: Assens

Area
  - Urban: 2.4 km^{2} (0.93 sq mi)

Population (2026)
  - Urban: 2,532
  - Urban density: 1,100/km^{2} (2,700/sq mi)
- Time zone: UTC+1 (CET)
  - Summer (DST): UTC+2 (CEST)
- Postal code: DK-5683 Haarby
- Website: Official website

Haarby or Hårby is a town in central Denmark with a population of 2,532 (1 January 2026). The town is located in Assens municipality, Syddanmark Region on the island of Funen. Until 1 January 2007 it was also the site of the municipality council of the former Haarby municipality.

== Notable people ==
- Uffe Ellemann-Jensen (born 1941 in Haarby – 2022) politician, Minister of Foreign Affairs (Denmark) 1982–1993.
