= Langeskov Municipality =

Former municipality of Denmark

Coordinates: 55°21′24″N 10°35′08″E

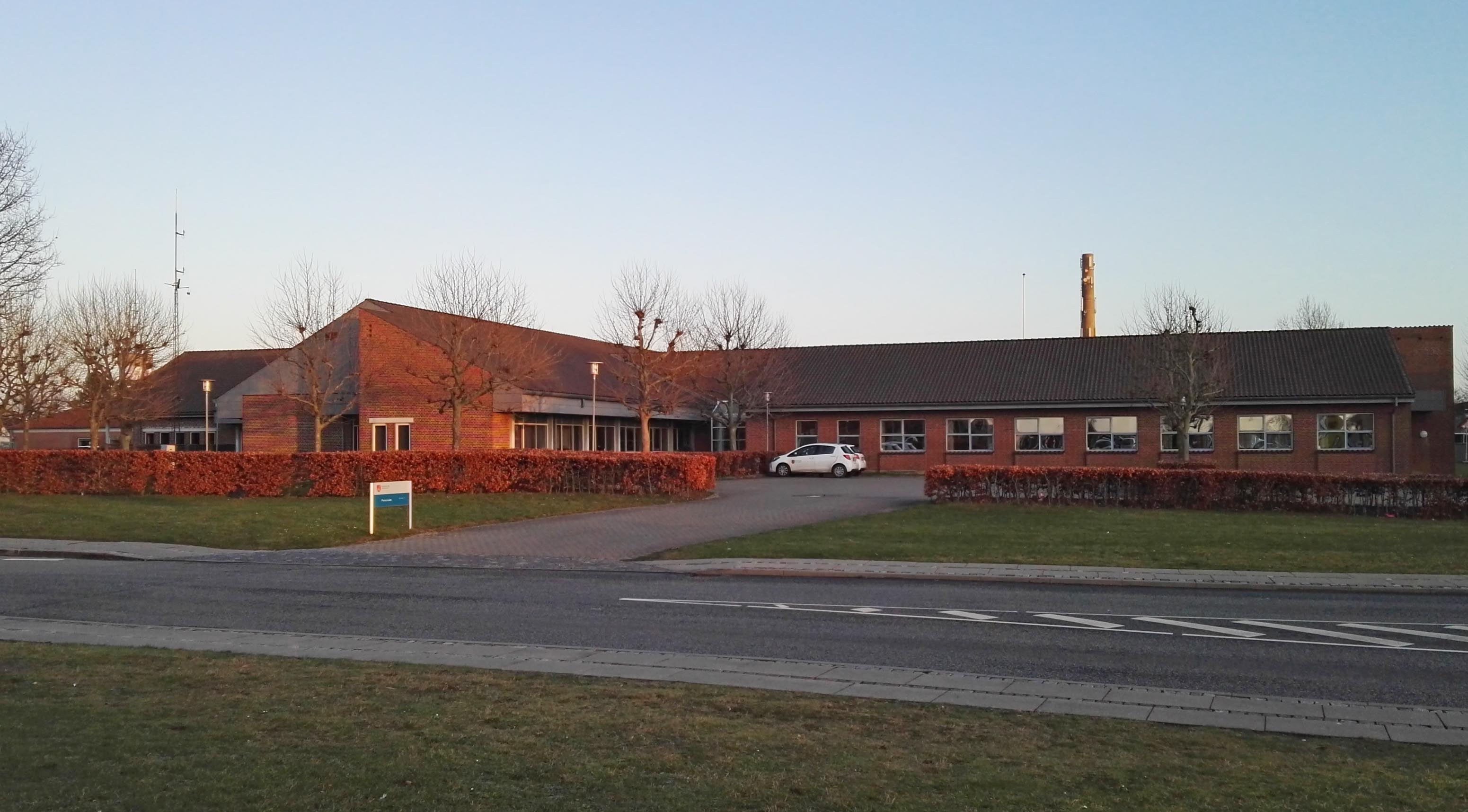
The former townhall of Langeskov Municipality

Until 1 January 2007 Langeskov municipality was a municipality (Danish, kommune) in Funen County near the northeast coast of the island of Funen in central Denmark. The municipality covered an area of 43 km^{2}, and had a total population of 6,365 (2005). Its last mayor was Ejvind Høyer Nielsen, a member of the Conservative People's Party (Det Konservative Folkeparti) political party. The main town and the site of its municipal council was the town of Langeskov in Rønninge Parish. Other towns in the municipality were Birkende, Marslev, and Rønninge, which also lend their names to the parishes within the municipality.

Langeskov municipality was known locally for being good at attracting industry, and had a better economy than most, if not all, of the neighbouring municipalities. Langeskov is the home of a local newspaper, Nordøstfyns Avis (The North-East Funen Paper).

The municipality was created in 1970 as the result of a kommunalreform ("Municipality Reform") that merged three parishes: Birkende parish, Marslev parish, and Rønninge parish. The two former formed Marslev-Birkende municipality, while Rønninge was an independent municipality. The founders of Langeskov municipality had originally hoped that more parishes would join the new municipality, but Kølstrup chose Kerteminde municipality instead and Rolfsted joined Årslev municipality. As a result, Langeskov municipality became relatively small.

Langeskov municipality ceased to exist as the result of Kommunalreformen ("The Municipality Reform" of 2007). It was merged with Kerteminde and Munkebo municipalities to form an enlarged Kerteminde municipality. This created a municipality with an area of 203 km^{2} and a total population of 23,071 (2005). The municipality belongs to Region of Southern Denmark.

== Famous residents of the municipality ==
The best known citizen of the municipality was Hans Tausen, who in the sixteenth century was one of the leading figures in Denmark's Lutheran Reformation. He was born in the village of Birkende.
