= Frøbjerg Bavnehøj =

Hill in Assens Municipality, Denmark

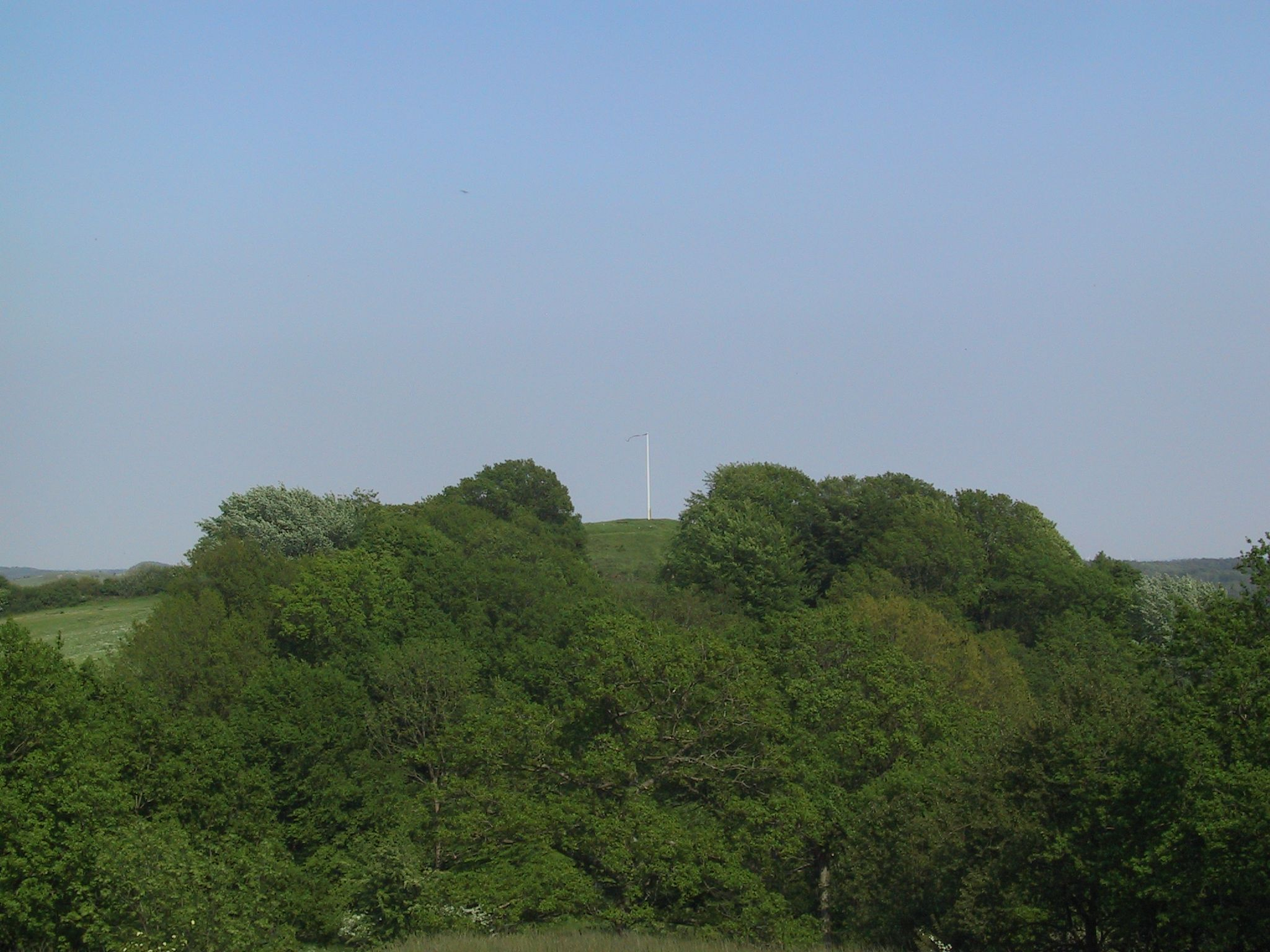
- Frøbjerg Bavnehøj

Highest point
- Elevation: 131 m (430 ft)
- Prominence: 131 m (430 ft)
- Coordinates: 55°20′N 10°07′E

Geography
- Location within Denmark
- Location: Funen island, Denmark

Frøbjerg Bavnehøj is 131 metres (430 ft) above sealevel and is the highest natural point on the island of Funen.
