= Assens Municipality =

Assens Municipality Assens Kommune (Danish)
- Municipality
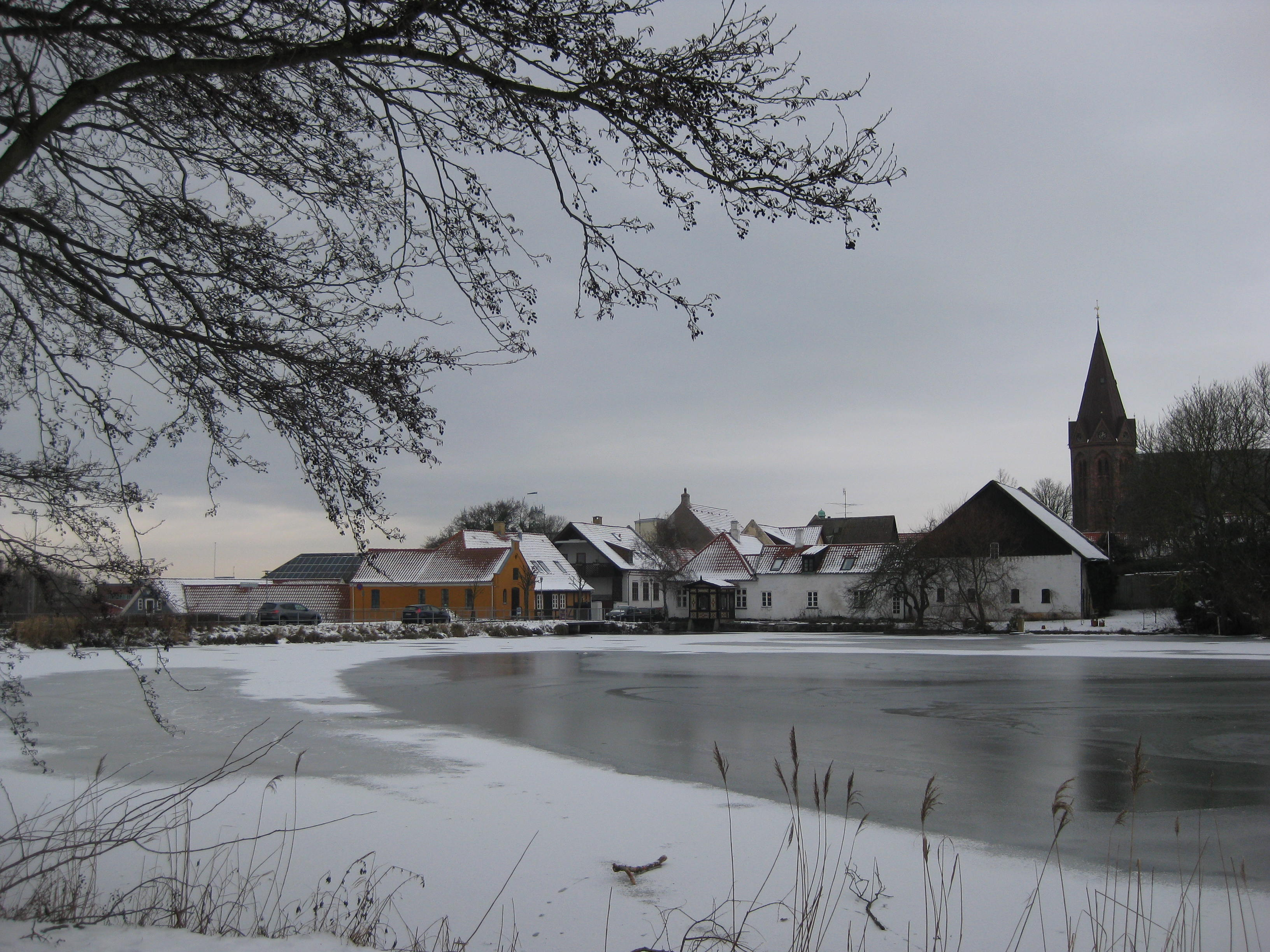

- Coat of arms

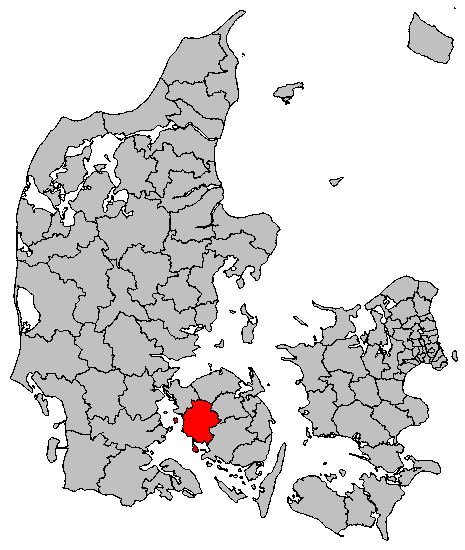
- Country: Denmark
- Region: Southern Denmark
- Established: 1 January 2007
- Seat: Assens

Government
  - Mayor: Søren Steen Andersen

Area
  - Total: 513 km^{2} (198 sq mi)

Population (1. January 2026)
  - Total: 40,369
  - Density: 78.7/km^{2} (204/sq mi)
- Time zone: UTC1 (CET)
  - Summer (DST): UTC2 (CEST)
- Postal code: 5610
- Website: www.assens.dk

Assens Municipality (Danish: Assens Kommune) is a kommune in the Region of Southern Denmark on the west coast of the island of Funen in central Denmark. The municipality covers an area of 513 km^{2} and has a total population of 40,369 (2026). Its mayor from 1 January 2014 is Søren Steen Andersen, a member of the agrarian liberal Venstre political party.

The municipality's main town and the site of its municipal council is the city of Assens.

The island of Helnæs is connected to the municipality by road. Ferry service connects the municipality at the city of Assens to the island of Bågø.

On 1 January 2007 the former Assens municipality was merged with Glamsbjerg, Haarby, Tommerup, Vissenbjerg and Aarup municipalities to form a new Assens municipality. This was part of the Kommunalreformen ("The Municipal Reform" of 2007). The former Assens municipality was formed in 1966 by combining the even-then existing Assens Municipality with seven other smaller municipalities located around it.

== Geography ==
The highest point on the island of Funen, Frøbjerg Bavnehøj (131 meters) is located in Assens Municipality.

=== Locations ===
Largest cities and villages in Assens Municipality
Name	Population (2024)
Assens	6,001
Glamsbjerg	3,356
Aarup	3,246
Vissenbjerg	3,246
Haarby	2,501
Tommerup Stationsby	2,462
Gelsted	1,723
Tommerup	1,596
Brylle	1,308
Ebberup	1,235

== Politics ==
Assens' municipal council consists of 29 members, elected every four years. The municipal council has five political committees.

=== Municipal council ===
Below are the municipal councils elected since the Municipal Reform of 2007.

Election	Party							Total seats	Turnout	Elected mayor
Election	A	B	C	F	O	V	Ø	Total seats	Turnout	Elected mayor
2005	13	1	4	1	1	9		29	74.0%	Finn Brunse (A)
2009	11	1	2	4	3	8		29	69.4%	Finn Brunse (A)
2013	10	1	1	1	4	11	1	29	76.4%	Søren Steen Andersen (V)
2017	8	1	1	2	3	13	1	29	76.1%	Søren Steen Andersen (V)
Data from Kmdvalg.dk 2005, 2009, 2013 and 2017

== Culture ==
Assens is home to the Boys Choir consisting of 23 boys (sopranos) between the ages of 9 and 14 years and 23 young men and adult (altos, tenors and bass) between the ages of 14 and 45 years. The choir was established in 1856, which makes it the oldest boy- and men choir in Denmark, however the tradition of using boys to sing in the church of Assens goes back to the 15th century. The Assens Boy Singers perform about 20 concerts a year in such countries as England, Germany, Switzerland, Netherlands, France, Spain, Italy, Sweden, Norway, Czech Republic, Ireland, Brazil, Canada, United States, Italy, Vatican and Iceland.

== Twin towns – sister cities ==
Assens is twinned with:

- Ljusdal, Sweden
- Oeversee, Germany
