= Birkende =

- Village
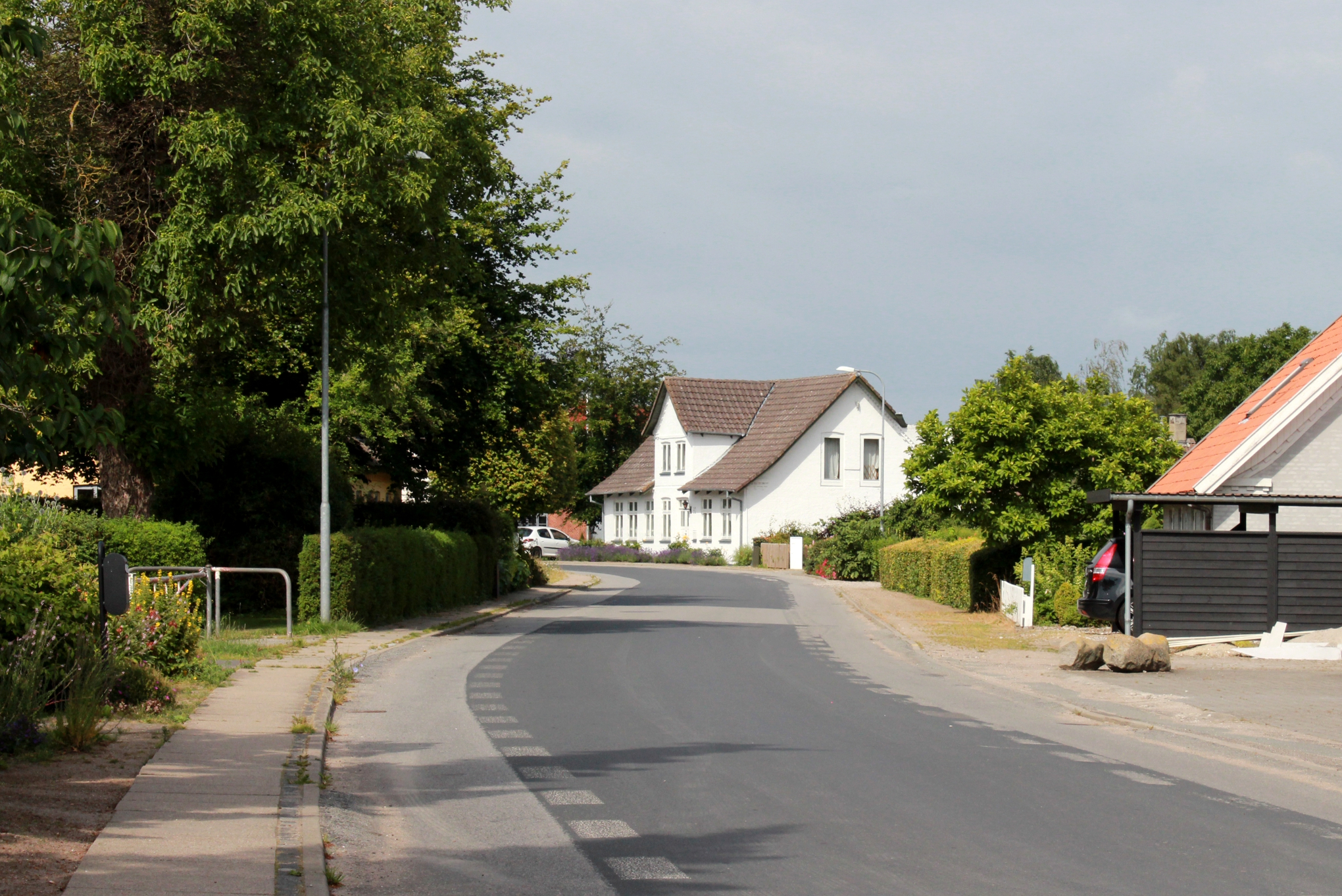

- Location in the Region of Southern Denmark
- Coordinates: 55°23′00″N 10°35′00″E
- Country: Denmark
- Region: Southern Denmark (Syddanmark)
- Municipality: Kerteminde
- Elevation: 130 ft (40 m)

Population (2026)
  - Total: 713

Birkende is a village with a population of 713 (1 January 2026) located in the Kerteminde municipality, on the island of Funen in central Denmark.

Birkende's local football team is Birkende BK.

== Notable people ==
- Hans Tausen (1494 Birkende – 1561), the leading Lutheran theologian of the Danish Reformation. He served as the Bishop of Ribe. There is a monument to him in the town centre.
