= Marslev =

- Village
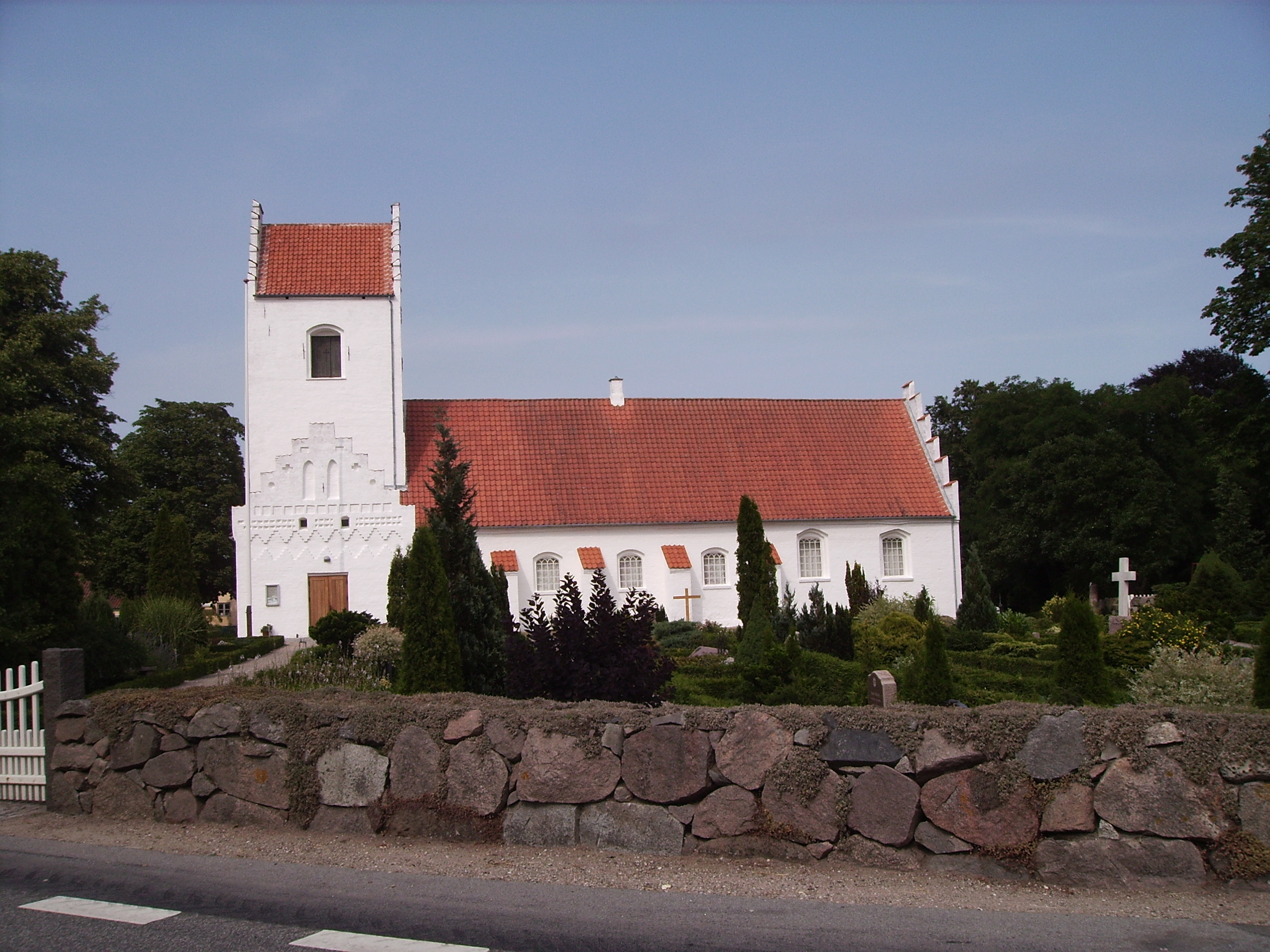
- Marslev Church

- Location in Region of Southern Denmark Marslev (Denmark)
- Coordinates: 55°23′39″N 10°30′59″E
- Country: Denmark
- Region: Southern Denmark
- Municipality: Kerteminde

Population (2026)
  - Total: 700

Marslev is a village, with a population of 700 (1 January 2026), in Kerteminde Municipality, Region of Southern Denmark in Denmark. Marslev and the southeastern neighbouring village of Vejruplund used to be separate villages but have merged together since 2013.

Marslev is situated on the island of Funen 6 km northwest of Langeskov and 9 km east of Odense.

Marslev Church, built in late Gothic style, is located in the village.
