= Bjarne Larsen =

Norwegian footballer (1904-1972)

Personal information
- Date of birth: 26 July 1904
- Date of death: 12 April 1972 (aged 67)

International career
Years	Team	Apps	(Gls)
1931	Norway	1	(0)

Bjarne Larsen (26 July 1904 – 12 April 1972) was a Norwegian footballer. He played in one match for the Norway national football team in 1931.
