= Kerteminde Municipality =

Kerteminde Municipality Kerteminde Kommune (Danish)
- Municipality
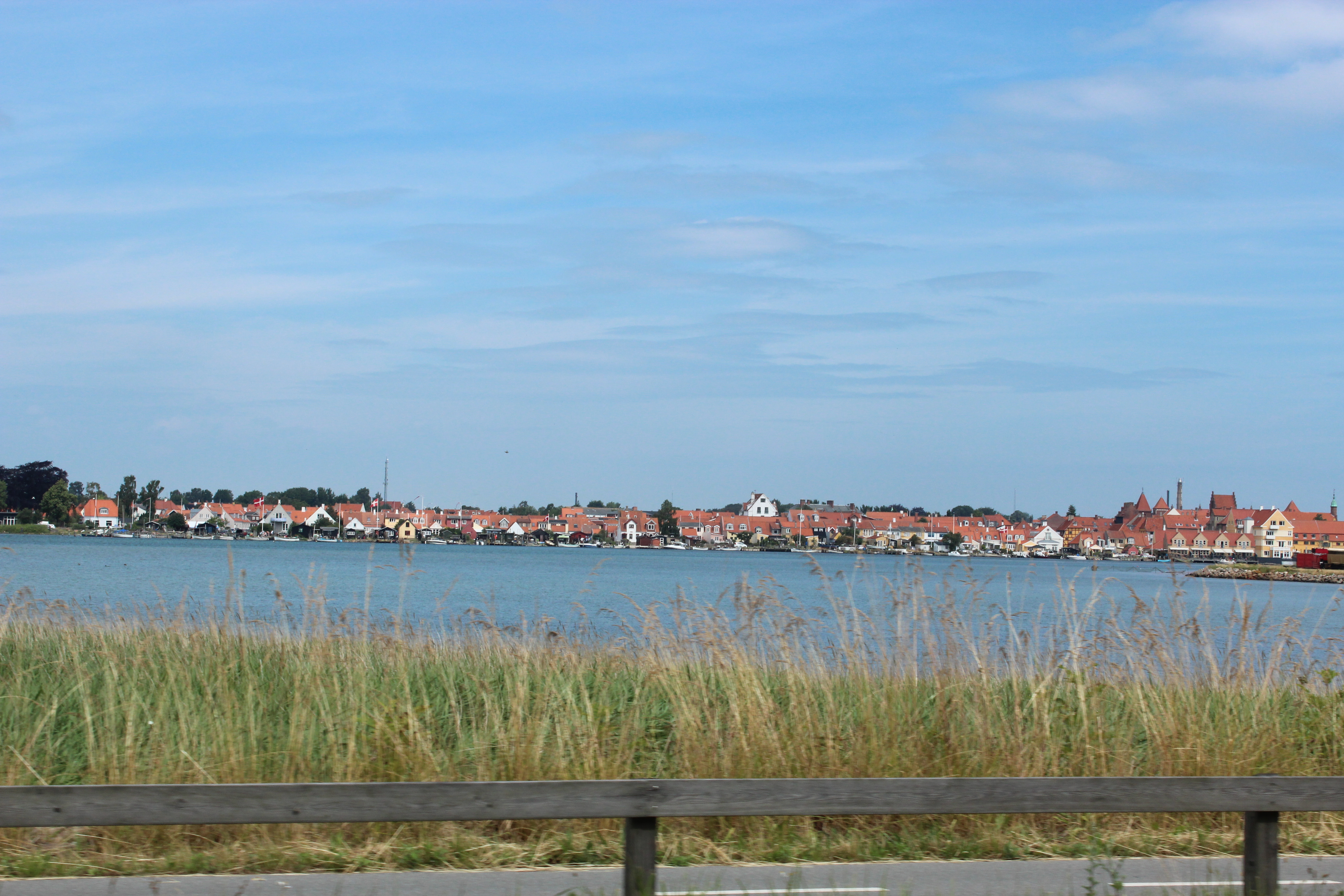

- Coat of arms

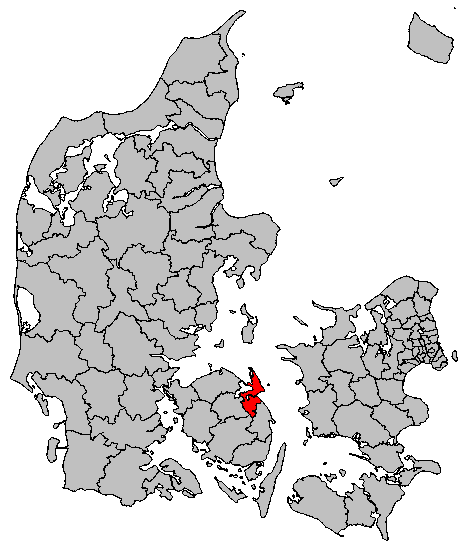
- Location in Denmark
- Coordinates: 55°27′00″N 10°40′00″E
- Country: Denmark
- Region: Southern Denmark
- Established: 1 January 2007

Government
  - Mayor: Michael Nielsen

Area
  - Total: 205.8 km^{2} (79.5 sq mi)

Population (1. January 2026)
  - Total: 24,299
  - Density: 118.1/km^{2} (305.8/sq mi)
- Time zone: UTC+1 (CET)
  - Summer (DST): UTC+2 (CEST)
- Postal code: 5300
- Website: www.kerteminde.dk

Kerteminde Municipality (Danish: Kerteminde Kommune) is a kommune in the Region of Southern Denmark on the northeast coast of the island of Funen in central Denmark. The municipality includes the island of Romsø, and it covers an area of 203 km^{2}. It has a total population of 24,299 (2026). The main town and the site of its municipal council is the town of Kerteminde.

Ferry service connects the municipality to the island of Romsø from the harbour in the town of Kerteminde.

== History ==
The municipality was created in 1970 as the result of a kommunalreform ("Municipal Reform") that merged a number of existing parishes:

- Dalby Parish
- Drigstrup Parish
- Kerteminde Parish
- Kølstrup Parish
- Mesinge Parish
- Revninge Parish
- Rynkeby Parish
- Stubberup Parish
- Viby Parish

On 1 January 2007 Kerteminde Municipality was, as the result of Kommunalreformen ("The Municipal Reform" of 2007), merged with existing Munkebo and Langeskov municipalities to form an enlarged Kerteminde municipality.

== Geography ==
The Kerteminde Fjord flows through Kerteminde town and divides the easternmost part of the municipality into two segments. In the west, an isthmus near Munkebo connects the two areas. The fjord is a segment of the Great Belt. This results in the northern portion of the municipality being located on a peninsula, surrounded by water on three sides:

- The Great Belt (Storebælt), the strait which separates Funen from the island of Zealand, to the east;traversed by the Great Belt Fixed Link bridges and train tunnels
- The Kattegat to the north
- The Kattegat and Odense Fjord to the west.

=== Locations ===
Kerteminde	6,000
Munkebo	5,500
Langeskov	4,000
Marslev	700
Birkende	600
Rynkeby	600
Dalby	310
Mesinge	300

== Politics ==
Kerteminde's municipal council consists of 25 members, elected every four years. The municipal council has six political committees.

=== Municipal council ===
Below are the municipal councils elected since the Municipal Reform of 2007.

Election	Party								Total seats	Turnout	Elected mayor
Election	A	B	C	F	O	P	V	Ø	Total seats	Turnout	Elected mayor
2005	11	1	6	2	1		4		25	77.5%	Palle Hansborg-Sørensen (A)
2009	8		3	5	2	3	4		25	73.2%	Sonja Rasmussen (A)
2013	7	1	1	2	3	6	5	1	25	79.1%	Hans Luunbjerg (V)
2017	7	1	7	2	3	1	3	1	25	76.6%	Kasper Ejsing Olsen (A)
Data from Kmdvalg.dk 2005, 2009, 2013 and 2017
