= Farsø Municipality =

Coordinates: 56.46°N 9.20°E

Farsø Municipality Farsø Kommune
- Former municipalities of Denmark
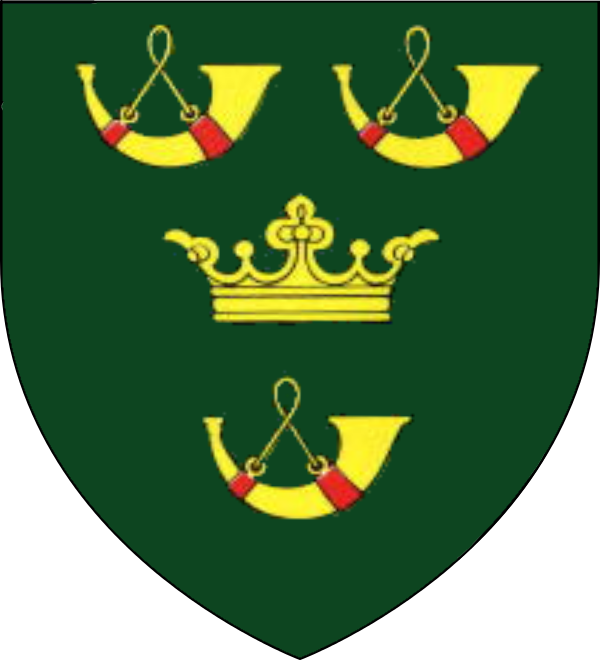

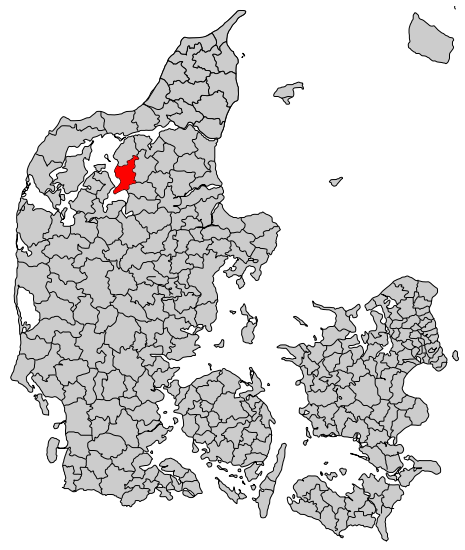
- Country: Denmark
- Region: Region of North Jutland
- Current municipality: January 1, 2007
- Seat: Farsø

Government
  - Mayor: H.O.A. Kjeldsen Last

Area
  - Total: 201.32 km^{2} (77.73 sq mi)

Population (2007)
  - Total: 7,991
  - Density: 39.69/km^{2} (102.8/sq mi)
- Time zone: UTC1 (CET)
  - Summer (DST): UTC2 (CEST)

Until 1 January 2007 Farsø Municipality (Danish: Farsø Kommune) was a municipality in North Jutland County. The municipality covered an area of 201 km^{2} (78 sq mi), and had a total population of 7,991 (2005). Its last mayor was H. O. A. Kjeldsen, a member of the Venstre (Liberal Party) political party.

Farsø municipality ceased to exist as the result of Kommunalreformen ("The Municipality Reform" of 2007). It was merged with Løgstør, Aalestrup, and Aars municipalities to form the new Vesthimmerland Municipality. This created a municipality with an area of 815 km^{2} (315 sq mi) and a total population of 39,176 (2005).

== History ==
Strandby-Farsø parish Municipality built a municipal office in the town of Farsø in 1941. Following the municipal reform in 1970, where the municipality of Farsø was established by merging with other parish municipalities, it was still used for the administration of the municipality until 1989, when a new town hall was put into service. Farsø Municipality was part of the municipal reform in 2007, where it was merged with Aalestrup, Løgstør, and Aars to form the Vesthimmerland Municipality.

== Mayor ==
| Period | Name | Party |
|---|---|---|
| 1970–1978 | Bernhard Nielsen-Man | Lokalliste |
| 1978-1982 | Erik Rabøl Jørgensen | Lokalliste |
| 1982–1986 | Bernhard Nielsen-Man | Venstre |
| 1986-1990 | Erik Rabøl Jørgensen | Lokalliste |
| 1990-1998 | Jette Thomsen | Det Konservative Folkeparti |
| 1998-2007 | H.O.A. Kjeldsen | Venstre |
