= Munkebo Municipality =

Former municipality in Denmark

Coordinates: 55°27′18″N 10°33′8″E

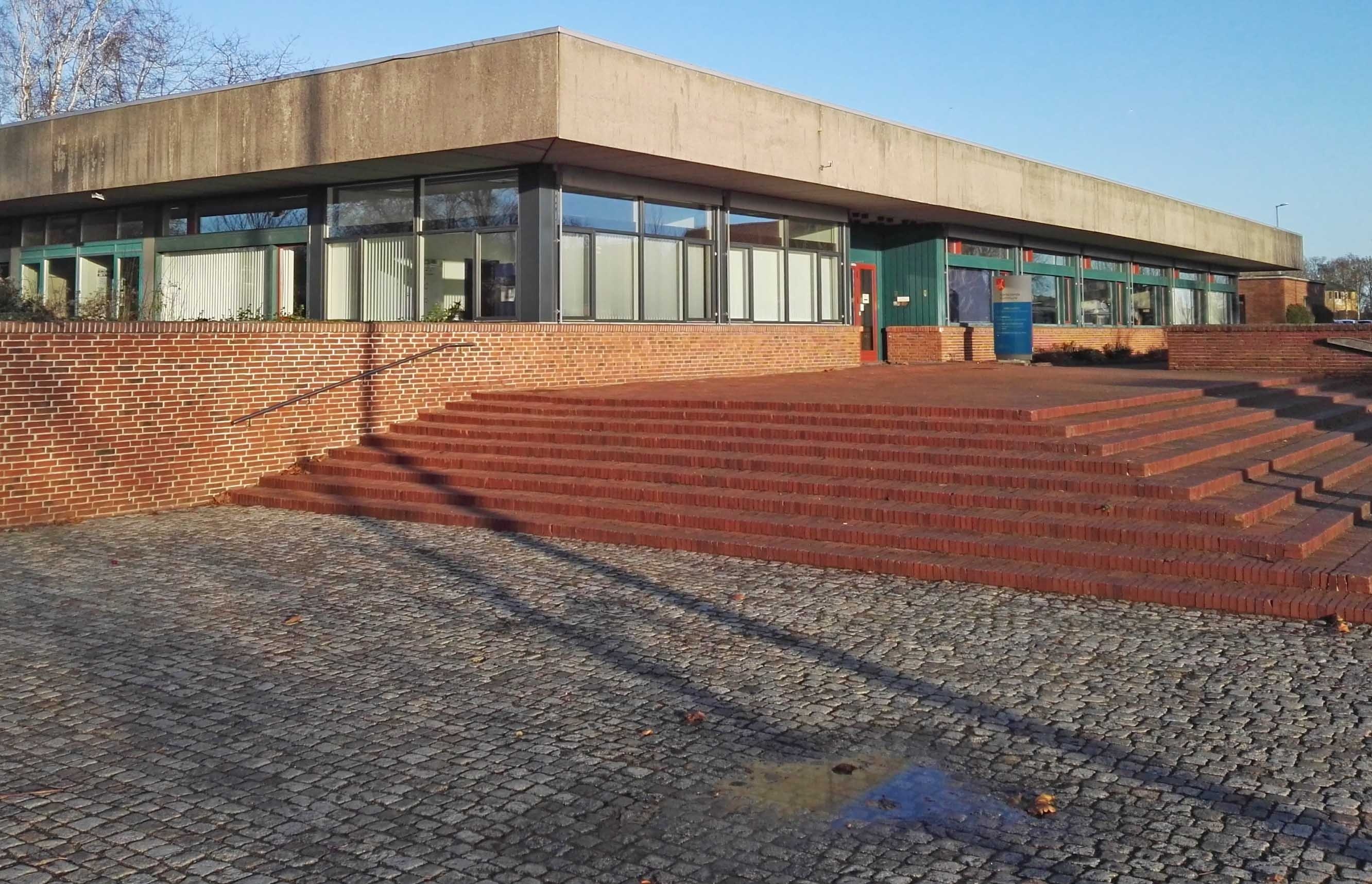
The former Munkebo municipality town hall, now one of Kerteminde Municipality's administrative centers

Until 1 January 2007, Munkebo municipality was a municipality (Danish, kommune) in former Funen County on the northeast coast of the island of Funen in central Denmark. The municipality covered an area of 19 km^{2}, and had a total population of 5,720 (2005). Its last mayor was Palle Hansborg-Sørensen, a member of the Social Democrats (Denmark) (Socialdemokraterne) political party. The main city and the site of its municipal council was the town of Munkebo.

The municipality was created in 1970 as the result of a kommunalreform ("Municipality Reform") from Munkebo Parish (Bjerge Herred).

Munkebo municipality ceased to exist as the result of Kommunalreformen ("The Municipality Reform" of 2007). It was merged with Kerteminde and Langeskov municipalities to form an enlarged Kerteminde municipality. This created a municipality with an area of 203 km^{2} and a total population of 23,071 (2005). The municipality belongs to the new Region of Southern Denmark.
