= Brande Municipality =

Municipality in Ringkøbing, West Denmark

Coordinates: 55.9507°N 9.0836°E

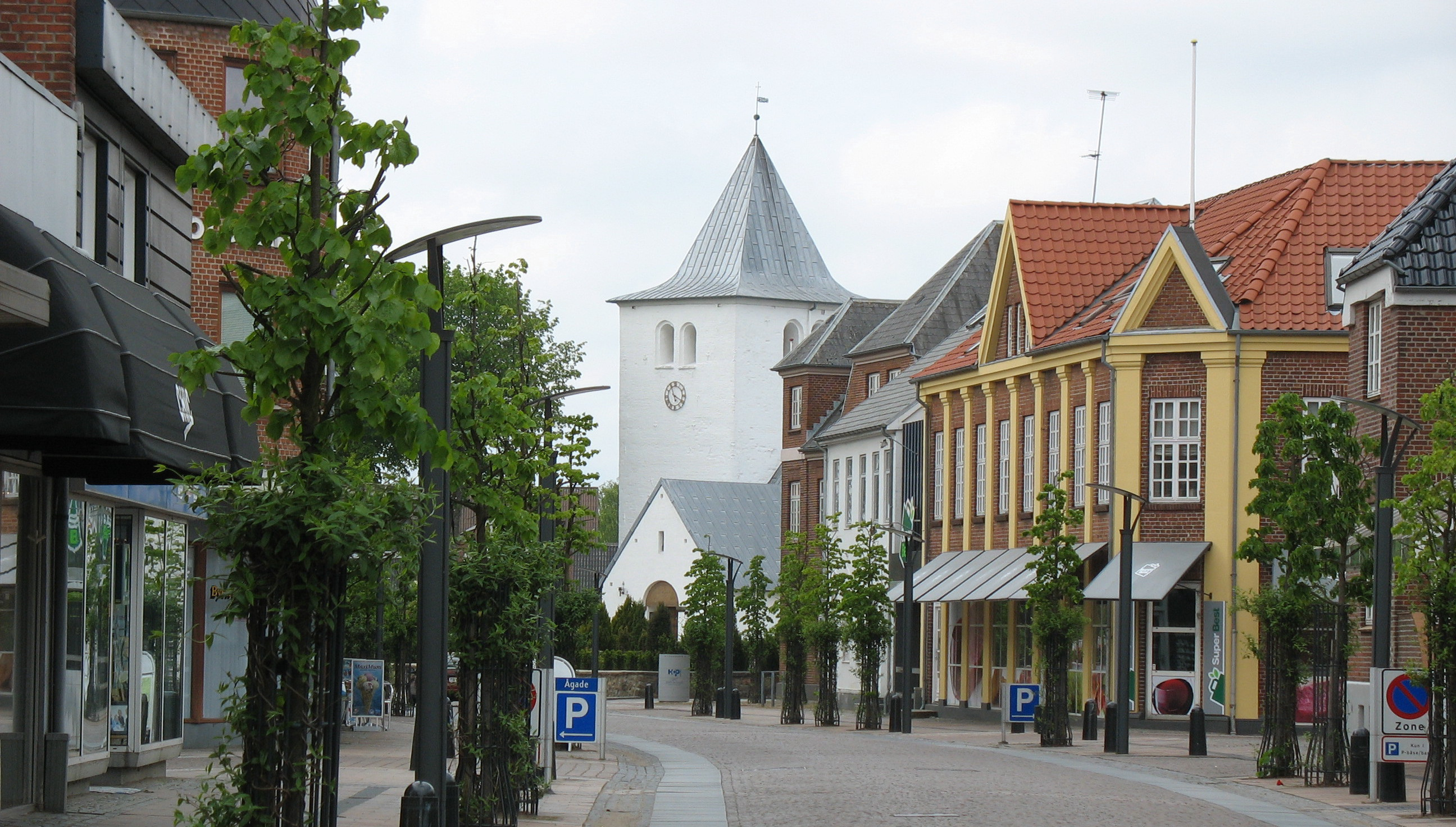

Until 1 January 2007, Brande municipality was a municipality (Danish, kommune) in Ringkøbing on the Jutland peninsula in west Denmark. The municipality covered an area of 188 km^{2}, and had a total population of 8,822 (2005). Its last mayor was Preben Christensen. The main town and the site of its municipal council was the town of Brande.

The municipality was created in 1970 as the result of a kommunalreform ("Municipality Reform") that Blåhøj and Brande parishes.

Brande municipality ceased to exist as the result of Kommunalreformen ("The Municipality Reform" of 2007). It was merged with Ikast and Nørre-Snede municipalities to form the new Ikast-Brande municipality. This created a municipality with an area of 768 km^{2} and a total population of 39,371 (2005). The new municipality belongs to the Region Midtjylland ("Mid-Jutland Region").
