= Gudme Municipality =

Former municipality of Denmark

Coordinates: 55.1493°N 10.7045°E

Until 1 January 2007 Gudme municipality was a municipality (Danish, kommune) in Funen County in central Denmark. The municipality covered an area of 120 km^{2}, and had a total population of 6,407 (2005). Its last mayor was Lars Erik Hornemann, a member of the Venstre (Liberal Party) political party. The municipality's main city and the site of its municipal council was Gudme.

The municipality was formed in 1970 from the following parishes;

- Brudager Sogn (Gudme Herred)
- Gudbjerg Sogn (Gudme Herred)
- Gudme Sogn (Gudme Herred)
- Hesselager Sogn (Gudme Herred)
- Oure Sogn (Gudme Herred)
- Vejstrup Sogn (Gudme Herred)

Gudme municipality ceased to exist as the result of Kommunalreformen ("The Municipality Reform" of 2007). It was merged with Svendborg and Egebjerg municipalities to form the new Svendborg municipality. This created a municipality with an area of 418 km^{2} and a total population of 58,354 (2005). The new municipality belongs to Region of Southern Denmark.
