= Skovbo Municipality =

Former municipality in Denmark

Coordinates: 55°15′30″N 11°51′07″E

Skovbo is a former municipality (Danish, kommune) in Roskilde County on the island of Zealand (Sjælland) in east Denmark. It covered an area of 132 km^{2}, and had a total population of 14,873 (2005). Its last mayor was Ole Hansen, a member of the Venstre (Liberal Party) political party.

The main town and the site of its municipal council was the town of Borup.

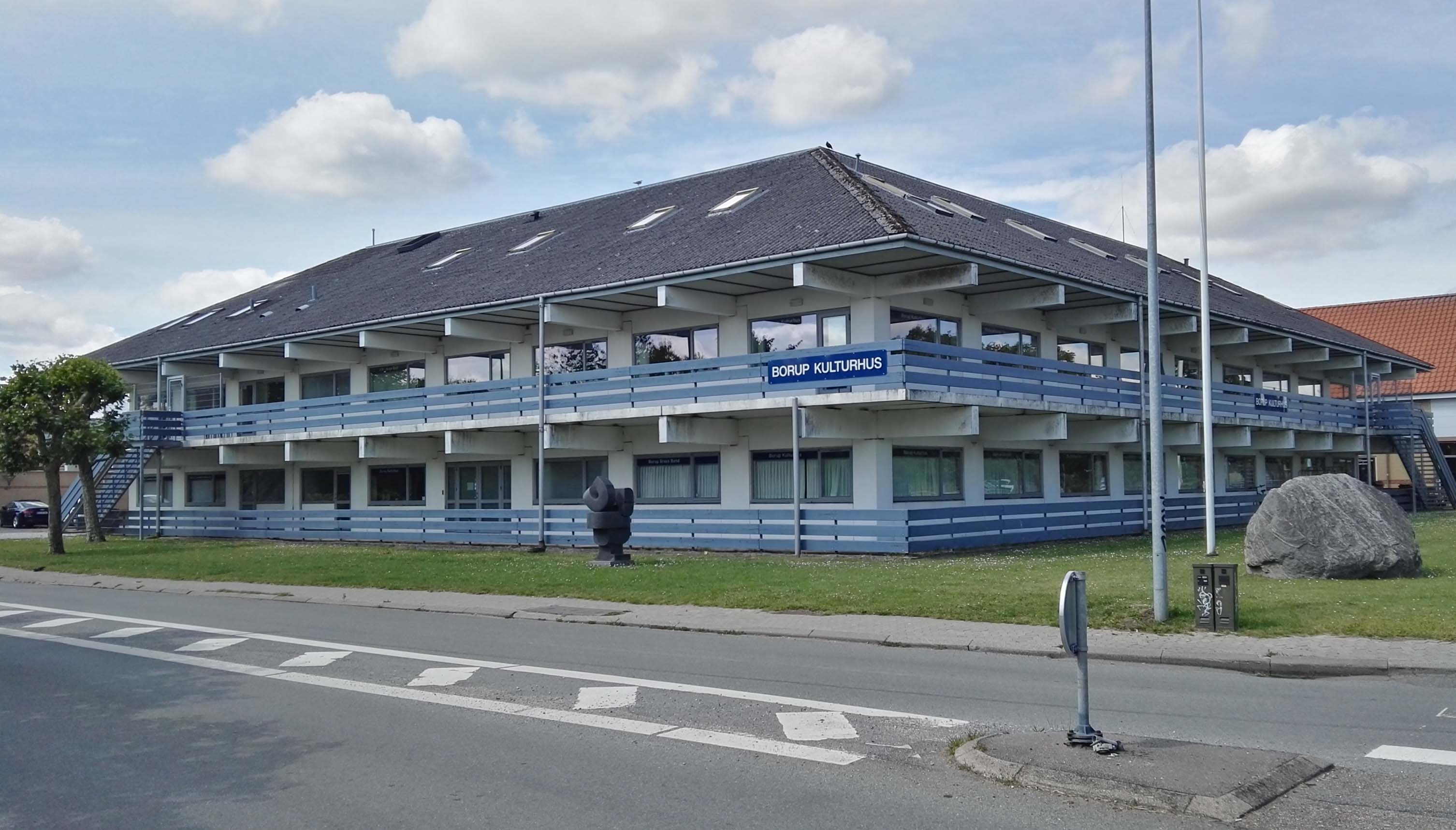
The former townhall of Skovbo Municipality in Borup, now community house

Neighboring municipalities were Køge to the east, Solrød, Ramsø, Lejre, and Hvalsø to the north, and Ringsted and Haslev to the west.

On 1 January 2007 Skovbo municipality, as the result of Kommunalreformen ("The Municipality Reform" of 2007), merged with the existing municipality of Køge to form the new Køge municipality. This created a municipality with an area of 255 km^{2} and a total population of 54,926 (2005). The new municipality belongs to the new Region Sjælland ("Zealand Region").
