= Grindsted Municipality =

Former municipality in Denmark

Coordinates: 55°45′24″N 8°55′49″E

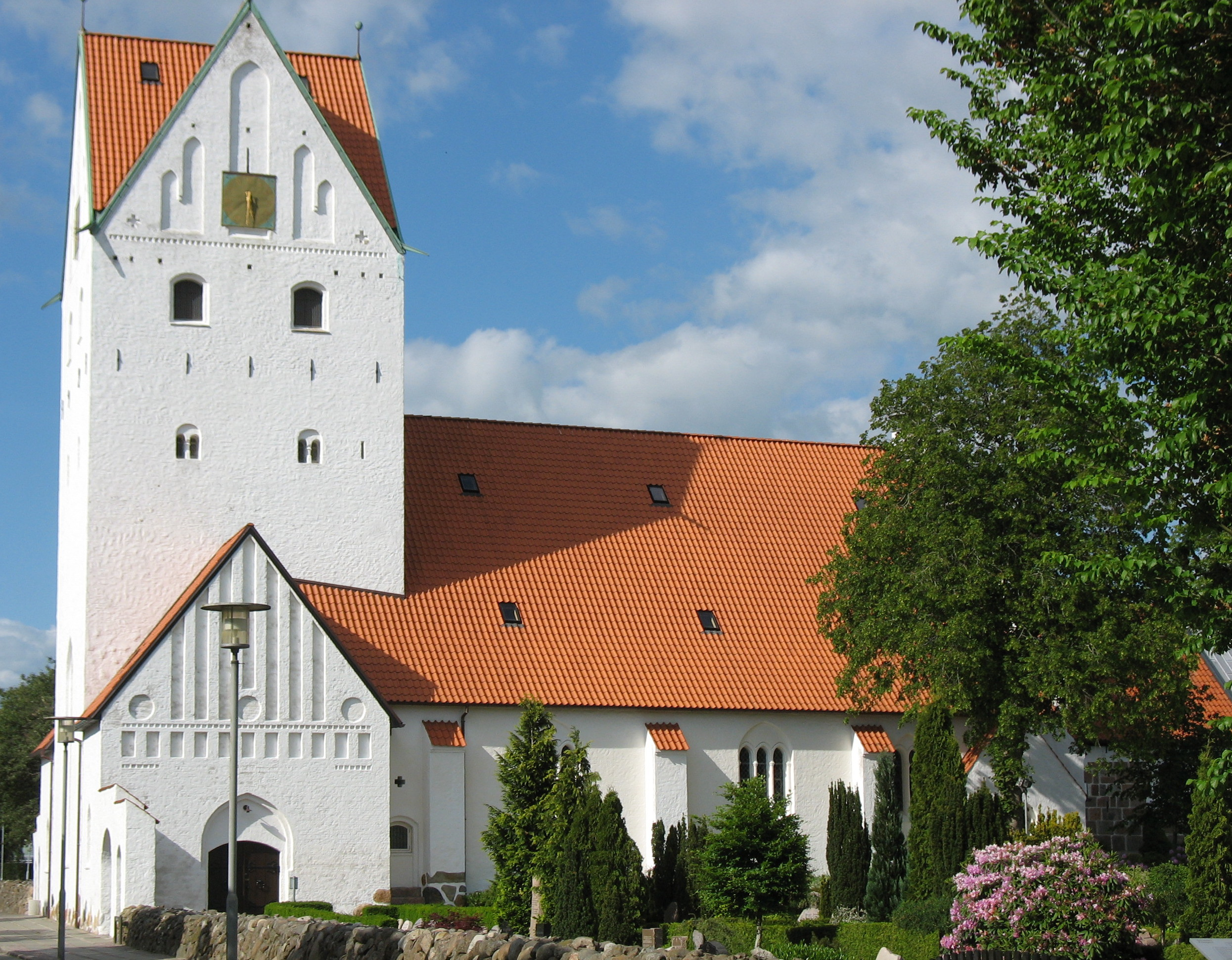
Grindsted Kirke

Until 1 January 2007, Grindsted municipality was a municipality (Danish, kommune) in Ribe County on the Jutland Peninsula in south-west Denmark. The municipality covered an area of 382 km², and had a total population of 17,379 (2005).

Its latest mayor was Ib Kristensen, a member of the Venstre (Liberal Party) political party. The site of its municipal council was the town of Grindsted. The municipality's motto was "Grindsted - Vi har det hele" which means "Grindsted - We have it all".

The town of Grindsted has good schools and good educational possibilities, and a well-built infrastructure for cars and pedestrians. The municipality ceased to exist as the result of Kommunalreformen ("The Municipality Reform" of 2007). It was merged into the existing Billund municipality. This created a municipality with an area of 536 km² and a total population of 26.103(2006).
