= Holsted Municipality =

Former municipality of Denmark

Coordinates: 55°30′37″N 8°55′4″E

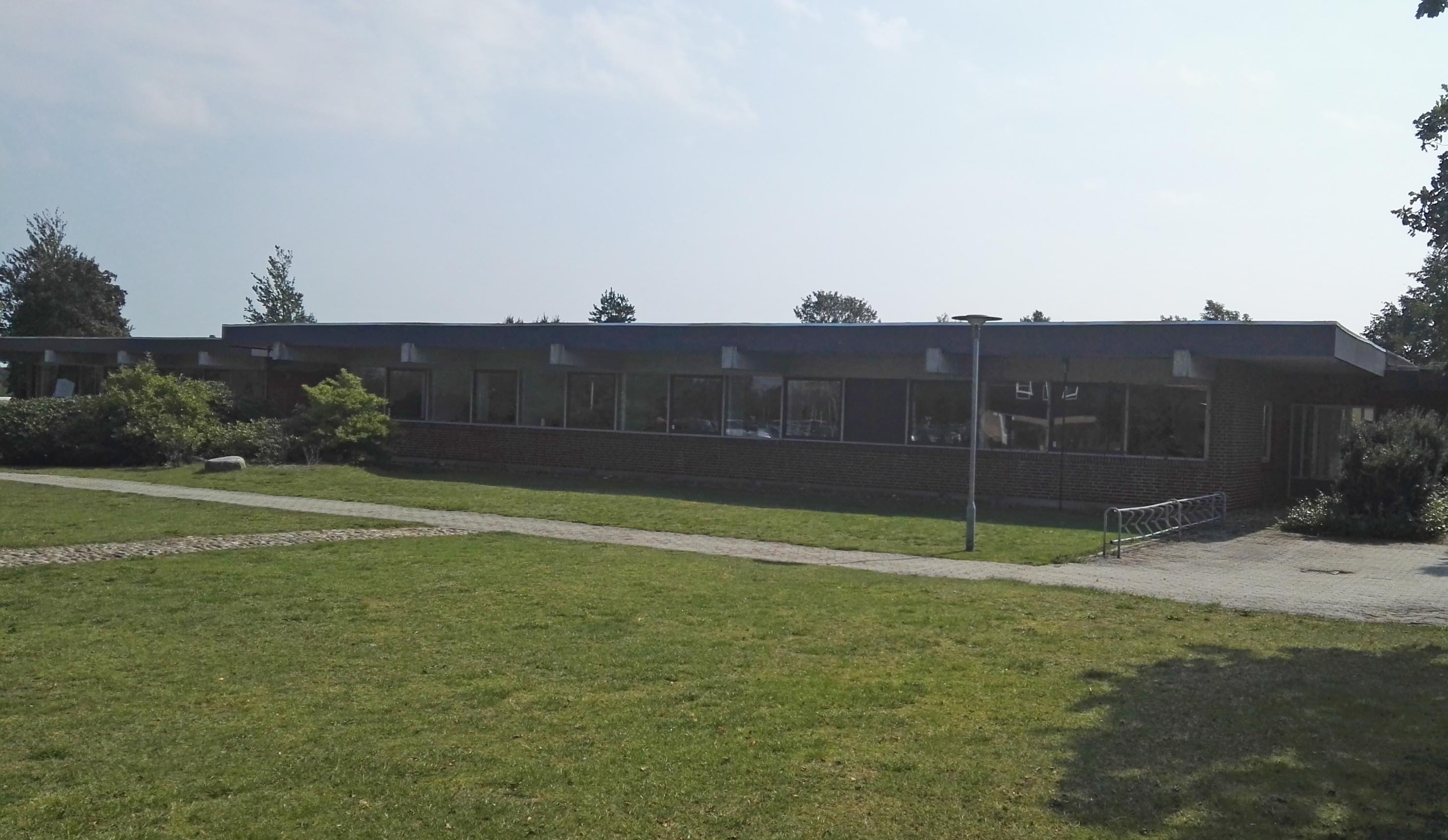
The former Holsted Municipality town hall at Højmarksvej 20, now a regional office in Vejen Municipality

Holsted Municipality is a former municipality (Danish, kommune) in Region of Southern Denmark on the Jutland peninsula in southwest Denmark. The municipality covered an area of 190 km^{2}, and had a total population of 6,965 (2005). Its last mayor was Carl Aaskov, a member of the Venstre (Liberal Party) political party. The main town and site of its municipal council was the town of Holsted.

On 1 January 2007 Holsted municipality ceased to exist due to Kommunalreformen ("The Municipality Reform" of 2007). It was merged with Brørup, Rødding, and Vejen municipalities to form the new Vejen municipality. This created a municipality with an area of 817 km^{2} and a total population of 41,350 (2005).
