= Egebjerg Municipality =

Former municipality in Denmark

Coordinates: 55.108°N 10.514°E

Until 1 January 2007, Egebjerg municipality was a municipality (Danish, kommune) in Funen County on the south coast of the island of Funen in south-central Denmark. The municipality covered an area of 124 km^{2}, and had a total population of 8,792 (2005). The last mayor of the municipality was Mogens Johansen. Its main city and the site of its municipal council was Vester Skerninge.

Egebjerg municipality ceased to exist as the result of Kommunalreformen ("The Municipality Reform" of 2007). It was merged with Svendborg and Gudme municipalities to form the new Svendborg municipality. This created a municipality with an area of 418 km^{2} and a total population of 58,354 (2005). The new municipality belongs to Region of Southern Denmark.
