= Glamsbjerg Municipality =

Municipality in Denmark

Coordinates: 55°16′44″N 10°06′19″E

Glamsbjerg municipality was a municipality (Danish, kommune) in Funen County on the island of Funen in central Denmark. The municipality covered an area of 91 km², and had a total population of 5,909 (2005). Its last mayor was Ankjær Stenskrog, a member of the Venstre (Liberal Party) political party. The municipality's main town and the site of its municipal council was the town of Glamsbjerg, which is located on the main road between the cities of Odense and Assens.

Glamsbjerg municipality ceased to exist on 1 January 2007 due to Kommunalreformen. It was merged with Assens, Haarby, Tommerup, Vissenbjerg, and Aarup municipalities to form a new Assens municipality. This created a municipality with an area of 513 km² and a total population of 41,201 (2005). The new municipality belongs to Region of Southern Denmark.
