= Vissenbjerg Municipality =

Former municipality in Denmark

Coordinates: 55°23′N 10°08′E

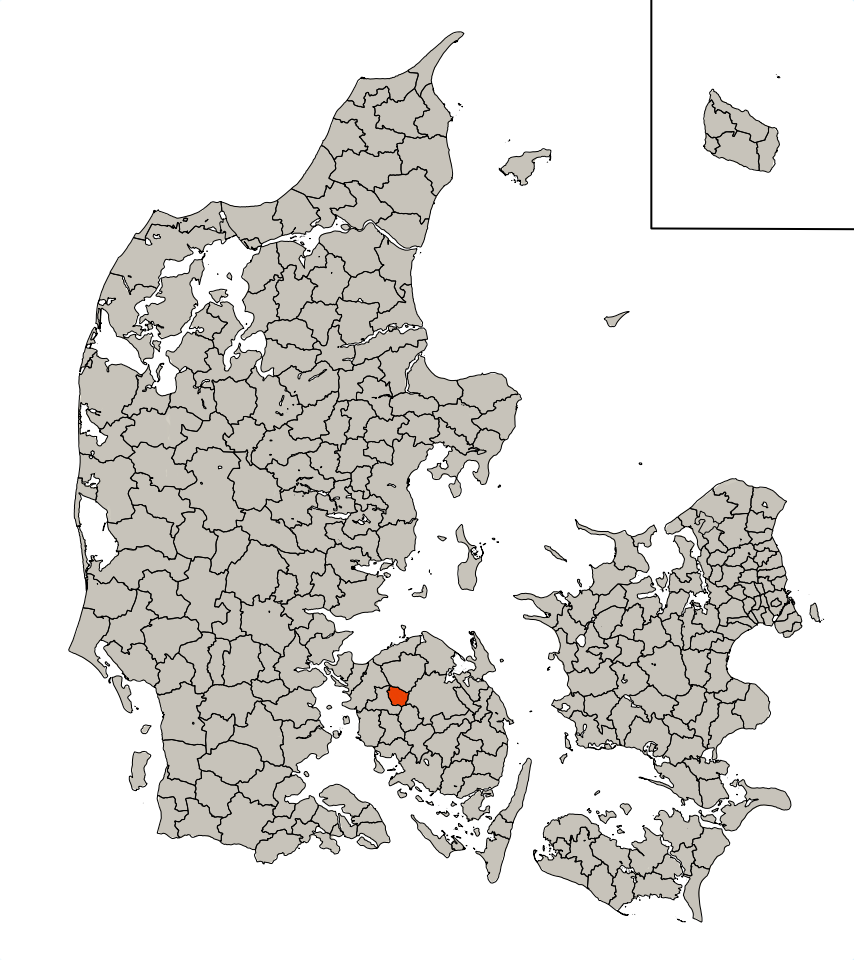
Vissenbjerg Municipality's location in Denmark

Until 1 January 2007 Vissenbjerg municipality was a municipality (Danish, kommune) in the former Funen County on the island of Funen in central Denmark. The municipality covered an area of 47 km^{2}, and had a total population of 6,096 (2005). Its last mayor was Lene Due Andersen, a member of the Social Democrats (Socialdemokraterne) political party.

The municipality's main city and the site of its municipal council was the town of Vissenbjerg.

The municipality was formed in 1970 from Vissenbjerg parish.

Vissenbjerg municipality ceased to exist as the result of Kommunalreformen ("The Municipality Reform" of 2007). It was merged with Assens, Glamsbjerg, Haarby Tommerup, and Aarup municipalities to form the new Assens municipality. This created a municipality with an area of 513 km^{2} and a total population of 41,201 (2005). The new municipality belongs to Region of Southern Denmark.
