= Tommerup Municipality =

Former municipality in Denmark

Coordinates: 55.3159°N 10.2042°E

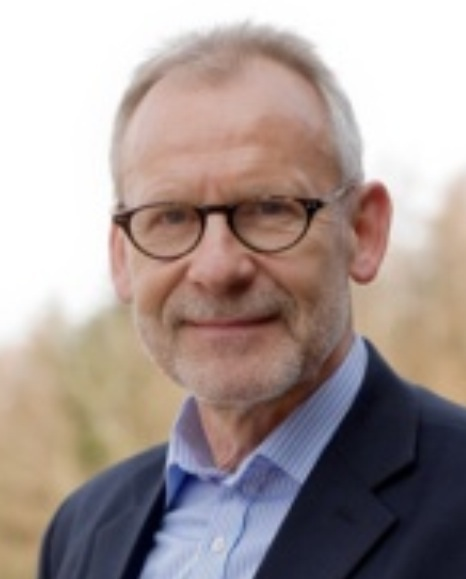
Finn Brunse, last mayor

Until 1 January 2007 Tommerup municipality was a municipality (Danish, kommune) in the former Funen County in central Denmark. The municipality covered an area of 74 km^{2}, and had a total population of 7,865 (2006). Its last mayor was Finn Brunse, a member of the Social Democrats (Socialdemokraterne) political party.

The municipality's main city and the site of its municipal council was Tommerup.

The municipality was created in 1970 due to a kommunalreform ("Municipality Reform") that combined the following parishes:

- Broholm Parish
- Brylle Parish
- Tommerup Parish
- Verninge Parish

Tommerup municipality ceased to exist as the result of Kommunalreformen ("The Municipality Reform" of 2007). It was merged with Haarby, Glamsbjerg, Assens, Aarup and Vissenbjerg municipality to form a new Assens municipality. This created a municipality with an area of 513 km^{2} and a total population of 41,201 (2005). The new municipality belongs to Region of Southern Denmark.

== International relations ==
=== Twin towns — Sister cities ===
- Väike-Maarja Parish, Estonia (1995–2007)
