= Haarby Municipality =

Former municipality in Denmark

Coordinates: 55.223°N 10.126°E

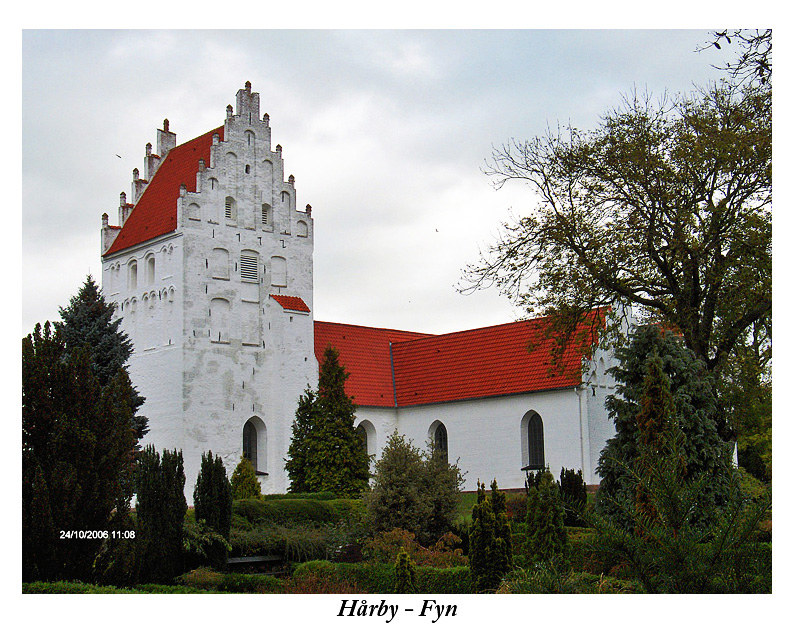
Harby Church in 2006

Until 1 January 2007, Haarby municipality or Hårby municipality was a municipality (Danish, kommune) in Funen County on the southwest coast of the island of Funen in central Denmark. To the south is Helnæs Bay (Helnæs Bugt). The municipality covered an area of 80 km^{2}, and had a total population of 5,037 (2005). Its last mayor was Ole Møller, a member of the Conservative People's Party (Det Konservative Folkeparti) political party. The municipality's main city and the site of its municipal council was the town of Haarby.

Haarby municipality ceased to exist due to Kommunalreformen ("The Municipality Reform" of 2007). It was combined with Tommerup, Glamsbjerg, Assens, Aarup and Vissenbjerg municipalities to form a new Assens municipality. This created a municipality with an area of 513 km^{2} and a total population of 41,201 (2005). The new municipality belongs to the Region of Southern Denmark.
