= Broby Municipality =

Former municipality in Funen County, Denmark

Coordinates: 55°13′11″N 10°15′45″E

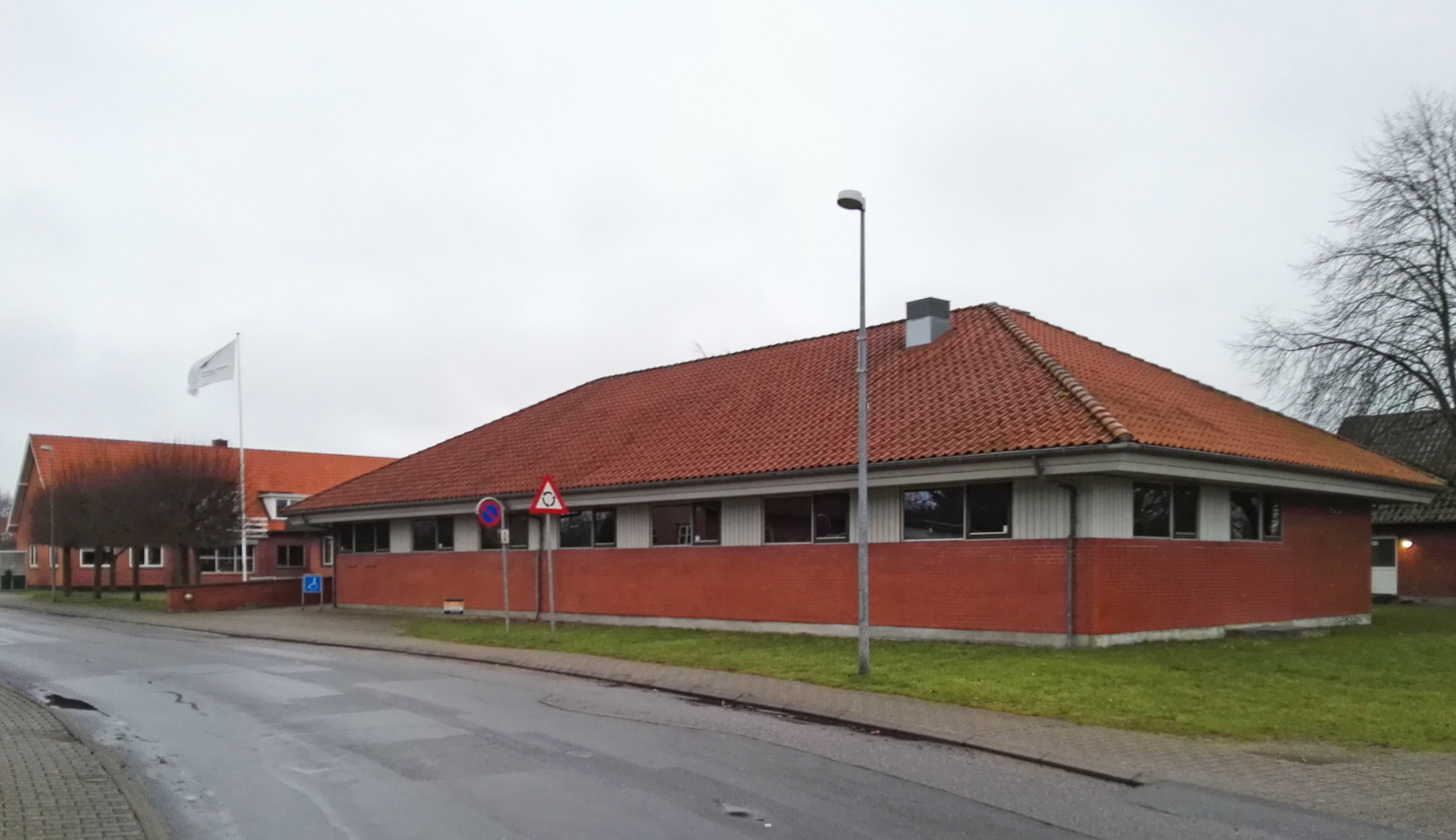
Broby Radhus (Town Hall)

Until 1 January 2007, Broby municipality was a municipality (Danish, kommune) in Funen County in central Denmark (but a small town called Broby is also found in the southern parts Sweden). The municipality covered an area of 100 km^{2}, and had a total population of 6,353 (2005). Its last mayor was Erling Bonnesen, a member of the Venstre (Liberal Party) political party. The main town and the site of its municipal council was the city of Nørre Broby.

Broby municipality ceased to exist as the result of Kommunalreformen ("The Municipality Reform" of 2007). It was merged with Faaborg, Ringe, Ryslinge, and Årslev municipalities to form the new Faaborg-Midtfyn municipality. This created a municipality with an area of 638 km^{2} and a total population of 51,144 (2005). The new municipality belongs to the Region of Southern Denmark.

== Twin cities ==
- Karstula, Finland
