= Ryslinge Municipality =

Former municipality in Denmark

Coordinates: 55°15′N 10°33′E

Until 1 January 2007 Ryslinge municipality was a municipality (Danish, kommune) in the former Funen County on the island of Funen in central Denmark. The municipality covered an area of 82 km^{2}, and had a total population of 6,924 (2005). Its last mayor was Gunnar Landtved, a member of the Venstre (Liberal Party) political party. The main town and the site of its municipal council was the town of Ryslinge.

The municipality was created in 1970 as the result of a kommunalreform ("Municipality Reform") that merged a number of existing parishes:

- Gislev Parish (Gudme Herred)
- Kværndrup Parish (Sunds Herred)
- Ryslinge Parish (Gudme Herred)

Ryslinge municipality ceased to exist as the result of Kommunalreformen ("The Municipality Reform" of 2007). It was merged with Broby, Faaborg, Ringe, and Årslev municipalities to form the new Faaborg-Midtfyn municipality. This created a municipality with an area of 638 km^{2} and a total population of 51,144 (2005). The new municipality belongs to Region of Southern Denmark.
