= Faaborg Municipality =

Former municipality of Denmark

Coordinates: 55.101°N 10.241°E

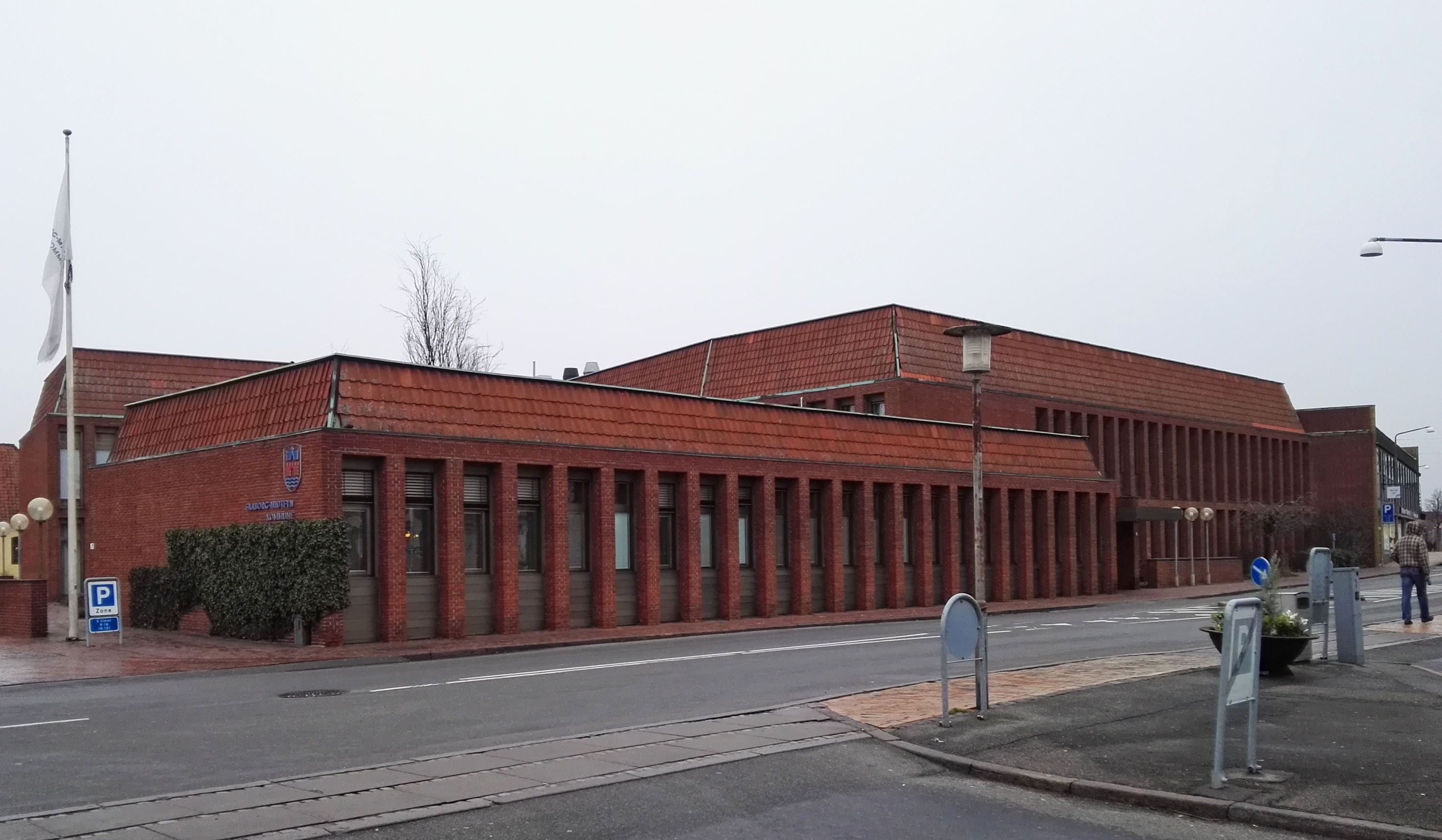
The town hall of the former Faaborg Municipality

Until 1 January 2007, Faaborg municipality or Fåborg municipality was a municipality (Danish, kommune) in Funen County on the southwestern coast of the island of Funen in central Denmark. The municipality included the islands of Lyø, Bjørnø, Avernakø, and Svelmø, and covered an area of 227 km^{2}. It had a total population of 17,325 (2005). Its last mayor was Britta Duelund, a member of the Social Democrats (Socialdemokraterne) political party. The main town and the site of its municipal council was the town of Faaborg.

Faaborg municipality ceased to exist as the result of Kommunalreformen ("The Municipality Reform" of 2007). It was merged with existing Broby, Ringe, Ryslinge, and Årslev municipalities to form the new Faaborg-Midtfyn municipality. This created a municipality with an area of 638 km^{2} and a total population of 51,144 (2005). The new municipality belongs to Region of Southern Denmark.

== The town of Faaborg ==
The town of Faaborg has a population of 7,251 (2003), and is located on Funen island's south coast at Faaborg Fjord. It is situated between hills, and in the straits lie many small islands. The town has many old well-preserved houses.

=== History ===
The town is first mentioned in a document kept at the National Archives in Paris, dated 25 June 1229. In this document the town of Faaborg, among other areas, is given as a present to King Valdemar Sejr's daughter-in-law. The town is described in the letter as a fortification, therefore it is assumed that the town had already existed for some time previous to 1229. This document is used as the basis for the town's age, and in 2004 the town celebrated its 775-year anniversary. The fortification is no longer extant; only the western gate remains to this day.
