= Årslev Municipality =

Former municipality in Denmark

Coordinates: 55°17′52″N 10°27′32″E

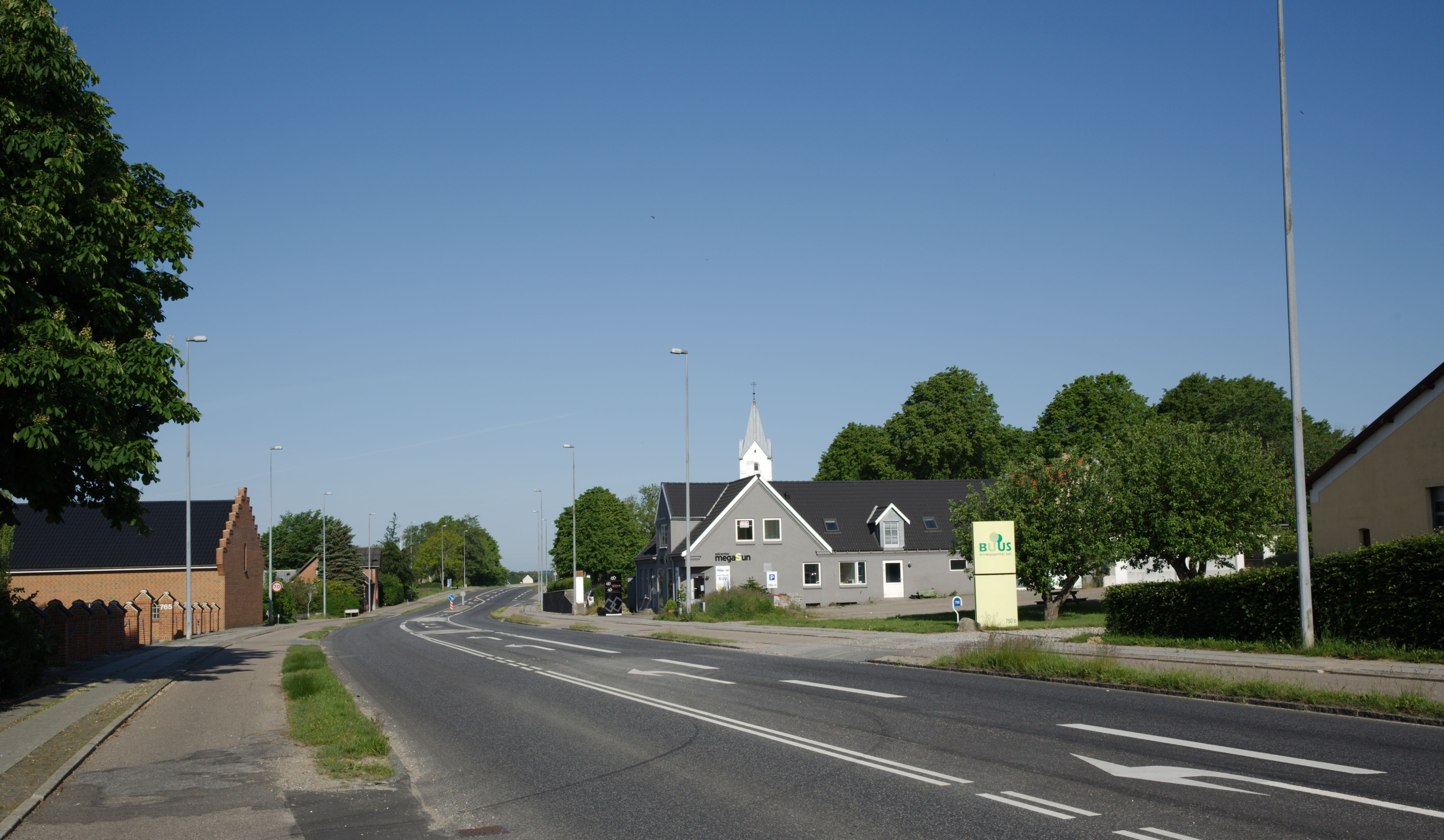

Årslev municipality (Danish: Årslev Kommune) is a former municipality (Danish, kommune) in the island of Funen in central Denmark. It merged into Faaborg-Midtfyn municipality on 1 January 2007. The former municipality covered an area of 74 square kilometres (29 sq mi), and had a total population of 9,365 (2005). It belonged to Funen County and its last mayor was Hans Jørgensen, a member of the Social Democrats (Socialdemokraterne) political party.

The main town and the site of its municipal council was the town of Årslev.

Neighboring municipalities were Ullerslev and Langeskov to the east, Odense to the north, Broby to the west, and Ringe and Ørbæk to the south.

Årslev municipality ceased to exist on 1 January 2007 as a result of Kommunalreformen ("The Municipality Reform" of 2007) in which it merged with Broby, Faaborg, Ringe, and Ryslinge municipalities, forming a new Faaborg-Midtfyn municipality. This created a municipality with an area of 638 km^{2} (246 sq mi) and a total population of 51,144 (2005). The new municipality belongs to the new Region of Southern Denmark.
