= Ringe Municipality =

Former municipality of Denmark

Coordinates: 55°33′40″N 10°16′49″E

Until 1 January 2007 Ringe municipality was a municipality (Danish, kommune) in the former Funen County on the island of Funen in central Denmark. The municipality covered an area of 154 km^{2}, and had a total population of 17,177 (2005). Its last mayor was Bo Andersen, a member of Venstre (Liberal Party). The main town and the site of its municipal council was the town of Ringe.

The municipality was created in 1970 as the result of a kommunalreform ("Municipality Reform") that merged a number of existing parishes:

- Espe Parish (Sallinge Herred)
- Gestelev Parish (Sallinge Herred)
- Heden Parish (Sallinge Herred)
- Hellerup Parish (Vindinge Herred)
- Herringe Parish (Sallinge Herred)
- Hillerslev Parish (Sallinge Herred)
- Krarup Parish (Sallinge Herred)
- Ringe Parish (Gudme Herred)
- Søllinge Parish (Vindinge Herred)
- Sønder Højrup Parish (Vindinge Herred)
- Vantinge Parish (Sallinge Herred)

Ringe municipality ceased to exist as the result of Kommunalreformen ("The Municipality Reform" of 2007). It was merged with existing Broby, Faaborg, Ryslinge, and Årslev municipalities to form the new Faaborg-Midtfyn municipality. This created a municipality with an area of 638 km^{2} and a total population of 51,144 (2005). The new municipality belongs to Region of Southern Denmark.
