= 2025 Nyborg municipal election =

Municipal election in Denmark

← 2021	18 November 2025	2029 →

All 25 seats to the Nyborg municipal council 13 seats needed for a majority
- Turnout: 19,442 (73.9%) ▲0.0%
	First party	Second party	Third party
	V	A	F
Party	Venstre	Social Democrats	Green Left
Last election	14 seats, 52.0%	8 seats, 27.4%	2 seats, 7.0%
Seats won	10	6	5
Seat change	▼4	▼2	▲3
Popular vote	6,638	4,580	3,299
Percentage	34.8%	24.0%	17.3%
Swing	▼17.2%	▼3.5%	▲10.3%
	Fourth party	Fifth party	Sixth party
	O	I	C
Party	Danish People's Party	Liberal Alliance	Conservatives
Last election	0 seats, 2.0%	0 seats, 0.4%	1 seat, 3.3%
Seats won	1	1	1
Seat change	▲1	▲1	0
Popular vote	1,073	785	700
Percentage	5.6%	4.1%	3.7%
Swing	▲3.6%	▲3.7%	▲0.3%
	Seventh party
	B
Party	Social Liberals
Last election	0 seats, 1.8%
Seats won	1
Seat change	▲1
Popular vote	582
Percentage	3.0%
Swing	▲1.3%
Mayor before election
Kenneth Muhs
Venstre
Mayor after election
Kenneth Muhs
Venstre

The 2025 Nyborg Municipal election was beheld on November 18, 2025, to elect the 25 members to sit in the regional council for the Nyborg Municipal council, in the period of 2026 to 2029. Kenneth Muhs from Venstre, would secure re-election.

== Background ==
Following the 2021 election, Kenneth Muhs from Venstre became mayor for a third term, on an absolute majority, with his party winning 14 of the 25 seats in the council. Since then, Rameesh Thirugnanasambanther, left the Social Democrats, and joined Venstre, giving them their 15th seat. Muhs would run for a fourth term.

== Electoral system ==
For elections to Danish municipalities, a number varying from 9 to 31 are chosen to be elected to the municipal council. The seats are then allocated using the D'Hondt method and a closed list proportional representation. Nyborg Municipality had 25 seats in 2025.

== Electoral alliances ==
=== Electoral Alliance 1 ===
Party		Political alignment
B	Social Liberals	Centre to Centre-left
F	Green Left	Centre-left to Left-wing
N	Bedre By Nyborg	Local politics
Å	The Alternative	Centre-left to Left-wing

=== Electoral Alliance 2 ===
Party		Political alignment
C	Conservatives	Centre-right
I	Liberal Alliance	Centre-right to Right-wing
O	Danish People's Party	Right-wing to Far-right

=== Electoral Alliance 3 ===
Party		Political alignment
L	Vi Lokale Demokrater	Local politics
V	Venstre	Centre-right
Æ	Denmark Democrats	Right-wing to Far-right

== Results by polling station ==
Division	A	B	C	F	I	L	N	O	Q	V	Æ	Ø	Å
Division	%	%	%	%	%	%	%	%	%	%	%	%	%
Aunslevhallen	18.6	1.9	4.9	14.7	4.1	0.9	0.2	7.9	0.6	36.3	5.5	2.4	1.8
Nyborghallen	28.3	3.7	3.4	18.9	3.5	0.3	0.6	4.7	0.2	31.0	1.8	2.1	1.6
Bastionen	23.4	4.3	4.0	23.5	4.4	0.3	0.9	3.4	0.0	32.0	1.5	1.6	0.9
Vindinge Forsamlingshus	22.6	3.0	3.3	19.4	4.4	0.5	0.5	5.2	0.1	35.0	2.8	1.6	1.6
Langå, Svindinge Og Øksendrup	14.3	1.7	4.6	15.5	4.4	1.0	0.2	9.2	0.3	36.2	6.3	4.4	1.9
Ullerslev	33.6	1.9	4.1	11.3	4.4	0.5	0.1	7.2	0.3	29.0	4.5	1.8	1.2
Ellinge	17.6	2.2	3.3	8.1	4.0	1.1	0.7	9.2	0.0	43.8	7.4	2.2	0.4
Skellerup	26.3	2.2	2.2	10.2	4.4	2.2	0.0	13.0	0.0	30.8	7.0	0.6	1.0
Langtved	18.1	1.6	2.8	15.5	4.2	0.2	0.2	7.2	0.2	39.4	7.0	2.0	1.6
Ørbæk	14.7	1.4	2.2	8.9	4.9	0.7	0.2	6.1	0.0	55.8	3.7	1.0	0.5
Frørup Og Tårup	21.6	1.9	4.4	15.6	3.0	0.6	0.5	8.2	0.0	35.3	5.0	2.3	1.4
Ellested Og Herrested	13.5	2.2	2.9	12.8	4.4	0.1	0.1	5.9	0.0	49.5	5.4	1.5	1.5
Kullerup Og Refsvindinge	21.1	2.3	5.0	9.3	5.5	0.3	0.1	7.6	0.0	39.4	6.6	1.0	1.7

== Results ==
Party		Votes	%	+/-	Seats	+/-
Nyborg Municipality
V	Venstre	6,638	34.76	-17.25	10	-4
A	Social Democrats	4,580	23.98	-3.45	6	-2
F	Green Left	3,299	17.28	+10.27	5	+3
O	Danish People's Party	1,073	5.62	+3.60	1	+1
I	Liberal Alliance	785	4.11	+3.67	1	+1
C	Conservatives	700	3.67	+0.33	1	0
Æ	Denmark Democrats	620	3.25	New	0	New
B	Social Liberals	582	3.05	+1.27	1	+1
Ø	Red-Green Alliance	356	1.86	-1.35	0	0
Å	The Alternative	254	1.33	New	0	New
N	Bedre By Nyborg	95	0.50	New	0	New
L	Vi Lokale Demokrater	87	0.46	-0.26	0	0
Q	Holger S. Jørgensen	27	0.14	New	0	New
Total		19,096	100	N/A	25	N/A
Invalid votes		70	0.27	-0.10		
Blank votes		276	1.05	+0.37		
Turnout		19,442	73.91	+0.03		
Source: valg.dk

== Opinion polls ==
Polling firm	Fieldwork date	Sample size	V	A	F	C	Ø	O	B	I	L	N	Q	Å	Æ	Others	Lead
Epinion	4 Sep - 13 Oct 2025	551	36.7	26.9	13.5	5.0	2.4	3.2	2.1	2.0	–	–	–	1.6	5.9	0.7	9.8
2024 european parliament election	9 Jun 2024		15.8	20.7	16.8	6.6	4.5	7.4	4.9	5.7	–	–	–	1.7	9.3	–	3.9
2022 general election	1 Nov 2022		13.2	35.1	7.6	4.0	3.5	3.0	2.2	5.8	–	–	–	1.8	10.0	–	21.9
2021 regional election	16 Nov 2021		42.7	27.6	7.3	4.5	4.4	3.6	3.3	0.8	–	–	–	0.3	–	–	15.1
2021 municipal election	16 Nov 2021		52.0 (14)	27.4 (8)	7.0 (2)	3.3 (1)	3.2 (0)	2.0 (0)	1.8 (0)	0.4 (0)	–	–	–	–	–	–	24.6
