= Nyborg Municipality =

Nyborg Municipality Nyborg Kommune (Danish)
- Municipality
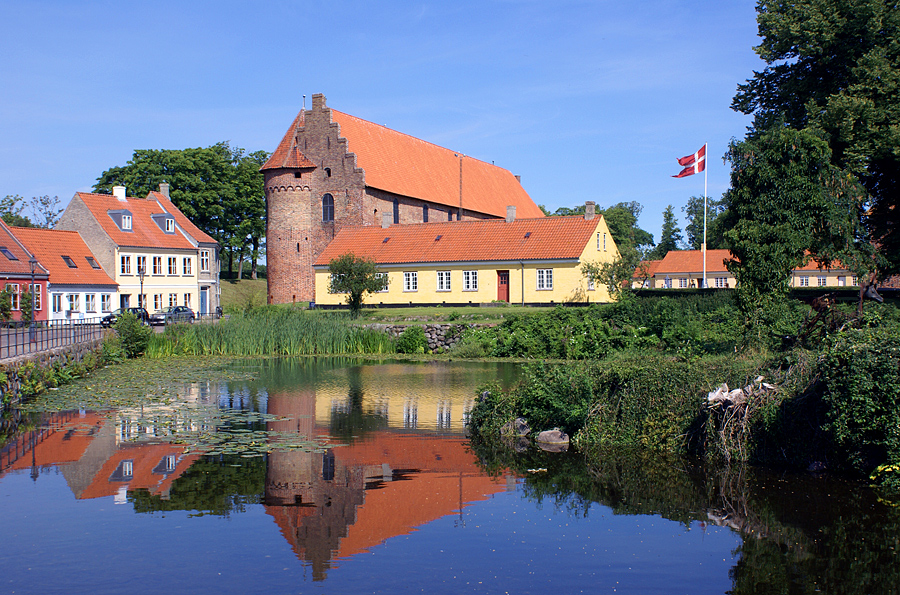
- Nyborg Castle

- Coat of arms

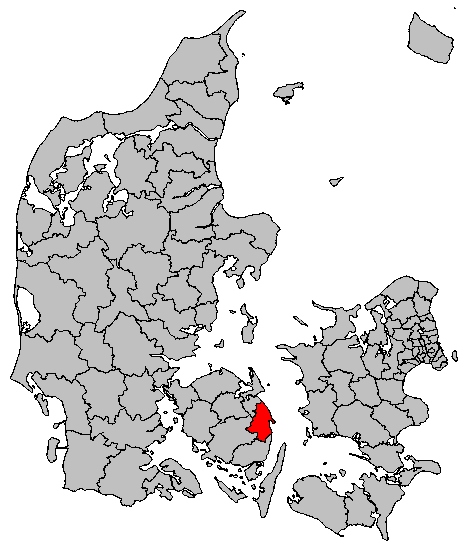
- Coordinates: 55°17′41″N 10°42′11″E
- Country: Denmark
- Region: Southern Denmark
- Established: January 1, 2007
- Seat: Nyborg

Government
  - Mayor: Kenneth Muhs (V)

Area
  - Total: 278 km^{2} (107 sq mi)

Population (1 January 2026)
  - Total: 32,401
  - Density: 117/km^{2} (302/sq mi)
- Time zone: UTC1 (CET)
  - Summer (DST): UTC2 (CEST)
- Municipal code: 450
- Website: www.nyborg.dk

Nyborg Municipality (Danish: Nyborg Kommune) is a kommune in the Region of Southern Denmark on the east coast of the island of Funen in central Denmark. The municipality covers an area of 278 km^{2}, and has a total population of 32,401 (2026). It borders Kerteminde Municipality to the north-west, Faaborg-Midtfyn Municipality to the south-west, Svendborg Municipality to the south and is connected to Slagelse Municipality by the Great Belt Bridge. Its mayor is Kenneth Muhs, a member of the Venstre (Liberal Party) political party. The main town and the site of its municipal council is the city of Nyborg.

The municipality was formed in 2007 as a result of the 2007 Municipal Reform, where the former Nyborg Municipality merged with Ørbæk and Ullerslev Municipality.

The island of Sprogø lies in the Great Belt c. 8.5 kilometers from the shores of the town of Nyborg. The Great Belt Bridge connects the municipality to the island, and then it continues to the island of Zealand at the town of Korsør.

Holckenhavn Fjord cuts into the municipality on its eastern shore, north of the castle of Holckenhavn. A road (Svendborgvej) connects the municipality across the fjord.

== History ==
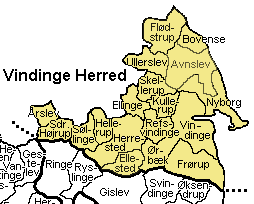
Vindinge Hundred and the market town of Nyborg. 1662–1793.

Nyborg Castle was built in 1170, and the city built up around the castle around that time. Nyborg Municipality as an administrative region has existed since the rule of Valdemar II of Denmark, who granted Nyborg the rights of a market town (Danish: Købstad). A royal charter from 1193 indicates that the city has been granted the status of a market town even earlier. Nyborg Castle became the seat of the Danish Court (Danish: Danehof), giving the town numerous unique privileges. Among those privileges was that the merchants of Vindinge Hundred had to go to Nyborg to sell their wares. In 1410, the market town of Nyborg was given the same privileges as that of Odense, an even older market town. The privileges were expanded in 1446, where the merchants of Gudme Hundred also had to go to Nyborg with their wares. Harbours between Kerteminde, Svendborg and Slipshavn were also outlawed, and Nyborg was given permission to arrange a large yearly market. The year after the privileges of 1446, artisans from Vindinge Hundred were told to move to the market towns, expanding the importance of the market town of Nyborg. With the king visiting regularly, due to Nyborg's central location and the castle being the seat of the Danehof, Nyborg was given many additional privileges over the years.

In 1662, Denmark's administrative divisions were changed. Fiefs (Danish: Len) were dissolved and the country split into counties. Nyborg County was created, and besides the market town of Nyborg, it included the hundreds of Vindinge Hundred, Sunds Hundred, Gudme Hundred, Sallinge Hundred and the eastern part of Bjerge Hundred. It also included ten birks: Hindsholm, Holckenhavn, Ravnholt, Glorup, Hesselager, Brahetrolleborg, Holstenshuus, Vantinge, Avernakø and Strynø. In 1793, Nyborg County was dissolved and merged with Tranekær County to become a part of Svendborg County, with its seat in Svendborg. This changed again in the 1970 Danish Municipal Reform, where Svendborg Country and Odense County were merged to form Funen County.

The hundreds, market towns and birks were dissolved in the municipal reform of 1970 and split Denmark into 277 municipalities. Nyborg Municipality was formed of the market town of Nyborg, and its parishes, as well as the two parish municipalities of Avnslev-Bovense and Vindinge. Ørbæk Municipality was formed of 7 parish municipalities, and Ullerslev Municipality was formed of 3 parish municipalities. In the 2007 municipal reform, these three municipalities of Nyborg, Ørkæk and Ullerslev were merged to form the present Nyborg Municipality.

=== Historical divisions ===
The table below shows the historical municipal subdivisions of Nyborg Municipality.

Historical municipal divisions of Nyborg Municipality
| 2007 | 1970 | 1966 | 1964 | 1947 | 1937 | 1875 | 1842 | 1200 | Towns |
|---|---|---|---|---|---|---|---|---|---|
| Nyborg Mun. | Nyborg Mun. | Nyborg Market Town Mun. | | | | | Nyborg Market Town | | Nyborg |
| Nyborg Mun. | Nyborg Mun. | Nyborg Rural Parish | | | | | | | Hjulby |
| Nyborg Mun. | Nyborg Mun. | Aunslev-Bovense Parish Mun. | | | | | | | Aunslev |
| Nyborg Mun. | Nyborg Mun. | Vindinge Parish Mun. | | | | | | | Vindinge |
| Nyborg Mun. | Ullerslev Mun. | Ullerslev Parish Mun. | | Skellerup-Ellinge Parish Mun. | | | | | Skellerup |
| Nyborg Mun. | Ullerslev Mun. | Ullerslev Parish Mun. | | Skellerup-Ellinge Parish Mun. | | | | | Ellinge |
| Nyborg Mun. | Ullerslev Mun. | Ullerslev Parish Mun. | | Ullerslev Parish Mun. | | Flødstrup-Ullerslev Parish Mun. | | | Ullerslev |
| Nyborg Mun. | Ullerslev Mun. | Flødstrup Parish Mun. | | | | Flødstrup-Ullerslev Parish Mun. | | | Flødstrup |
| Nyborg Mun. | Ørbæk Mun. | Ørbæk Parish Mun. | Ørbæk Parish Mun. | | | | | | Ørbæk |
| Nyborg Mun. | Ørbæk Mun. | Ørbæk Parish Mun. | Frørup Parish Mun. | | | | | | Frørup |
| Nyborg Mun. | Ørbæk Mun. | Ørbæk Parish Mun. | Langå-Øksendrup Parish Mun. | | | | | | Langå |
| Nyborg Mun. | Ørbæk Mun. | Ørbæk Parish Mun. | Svindinge Parish Mun. | | | | | | Svindinge |
| Nyborg Mun. | Ørbæk Mun. | Ørbæk Parish Mun. | Herrested Parish Mun. | | | | | | Måre |
| Nyborg Mun. | Ørbæk Mun. | Ørbæk Parish Mun. | Kullerup-Refsvindinge Parish Mun. | | | | | | Refsvindinge |
| Nyborg Mun. | Ørbæk Mun. | Ørbæk Parish Mun. | Ellested Parish Mun. | | Gislev-Ellested Parish Mun. (Note: Also part of today's Svendborg Municipality.) | | | | Ellested |

=== Honorary citizens ===
Four people are honorary citizens of the municipality. All four were granted honorary citizenship while Nyborg was still a market town.

- Waldemar Nicolai Bryggemann Beichmann (1783–1862) was granted honorary citizenship in 1841. From 1801 to 1841 he was lieutenant colonel in Nyborg Garrison.
- Frederik Ludvig Bierfreund (1782–1873) was granted honorary citizenship in 1858. He was in the Jaeger Corps on Sjælland. From 1829 to 1853 he was bailiff of Nyborg.
- Christian Eiler Lensbaron Holck (1847–1919) was granted honorary citizenship in 1908. He was the baron of Holckenhavn from 1877 and was in 1883 elected to sit in Vindinge Parish' parish council where he sat for 25 years. He was the chairman of Nyborg Tourist Association (Danish: Nyborg Turistforening) from 1899 and until his death in 1919.
- Johannes Christian Marius Nielsen Høirup (1877–1958) was granted honorary citizenship in 1957. He was a school principal and author, and from 1933 to 1947 he was in charge of the school system in Nyborg. He modernized Nyborg's school system and later acted as the chairman of Nyborg Tourist Association (Danish: Nyborg Turistforening).

== Towns ==
Below are all settlements in the municipality with populations of at least 200 people (populations as of 2020).

| Nyborg | 17,268 |
| Ullerslev | 2,706 |
| Ørbæk | 1,691 |
| Måre | 569 |
| Refsvindinge | 566 |

| Vindinge | 474 |
| Aunslev | 416 |
| Frørup | 412 |
| Hjulby | 395 |
| Skellerup | 333 |

| Tårup | 310 |
| Svindinge | 308 |
| Ellinge | 242 |

=== Nyborg ===
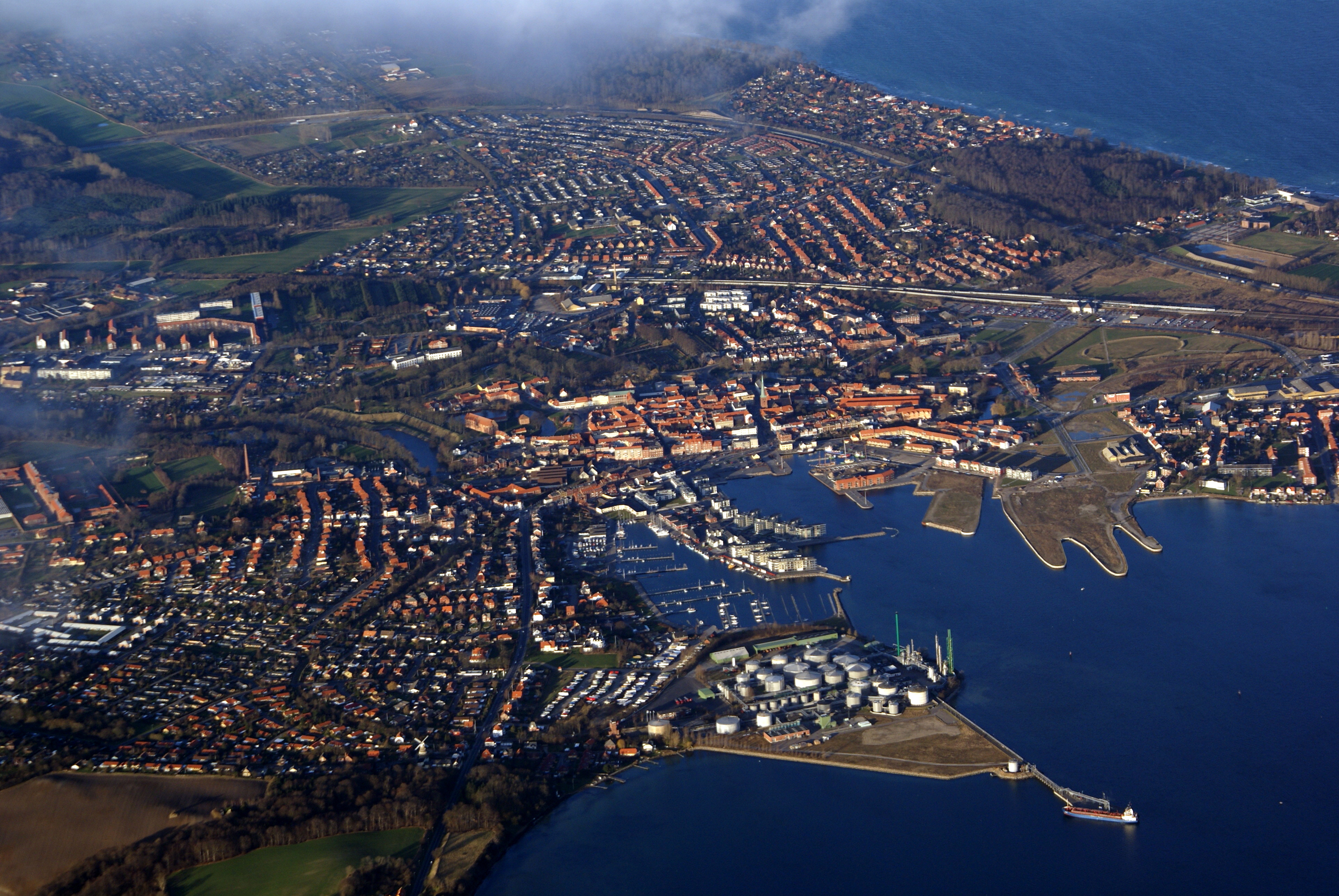
The city of Nyborg

Nyborg is connected to Sjælland through the Great Belt Bridge to the east, with motorway exits allowing to enter the city straight from the bridge. The city also has a railway station and a marina. The railway station was opened along with the Great Belt Bridge in 1997. 17,268 people live in the city of Nyborg (2020).

To the east and south-east of the city is the Nyborg Fjord and Knudshoved Spit. The southern parts of the spit are protected areas, while the northern parts houses the former ferry docks, a golf club and restaurants. Plans have been made to turn the old ferry docks into a marina. The Holckenhavn Fjord is located south of the town, with the Holckenhavn Castle on the opposite side of the fjord. To the south-west, the neighbourhood of Pilshuse connects to the village of Vindinge and Vindinge Forest. Further north, the city borders the forests of Jagtenborg, Telegrafskoven, Juelsberg and Skemark. Due north the city borders the village of Skaboeshuse and the forest Teglværkskoven. To the north-east, Nyborg borders the Great Belt Strait.

In the city of Nyborg are several attractions from its time as a fort city, including Nyborg Castle and its surrounding fortifications. A large project to renovate the castle is scheduled to be complete in 2023. Nyborg Voldspil, an acting group, perform their plays on the fortifications.

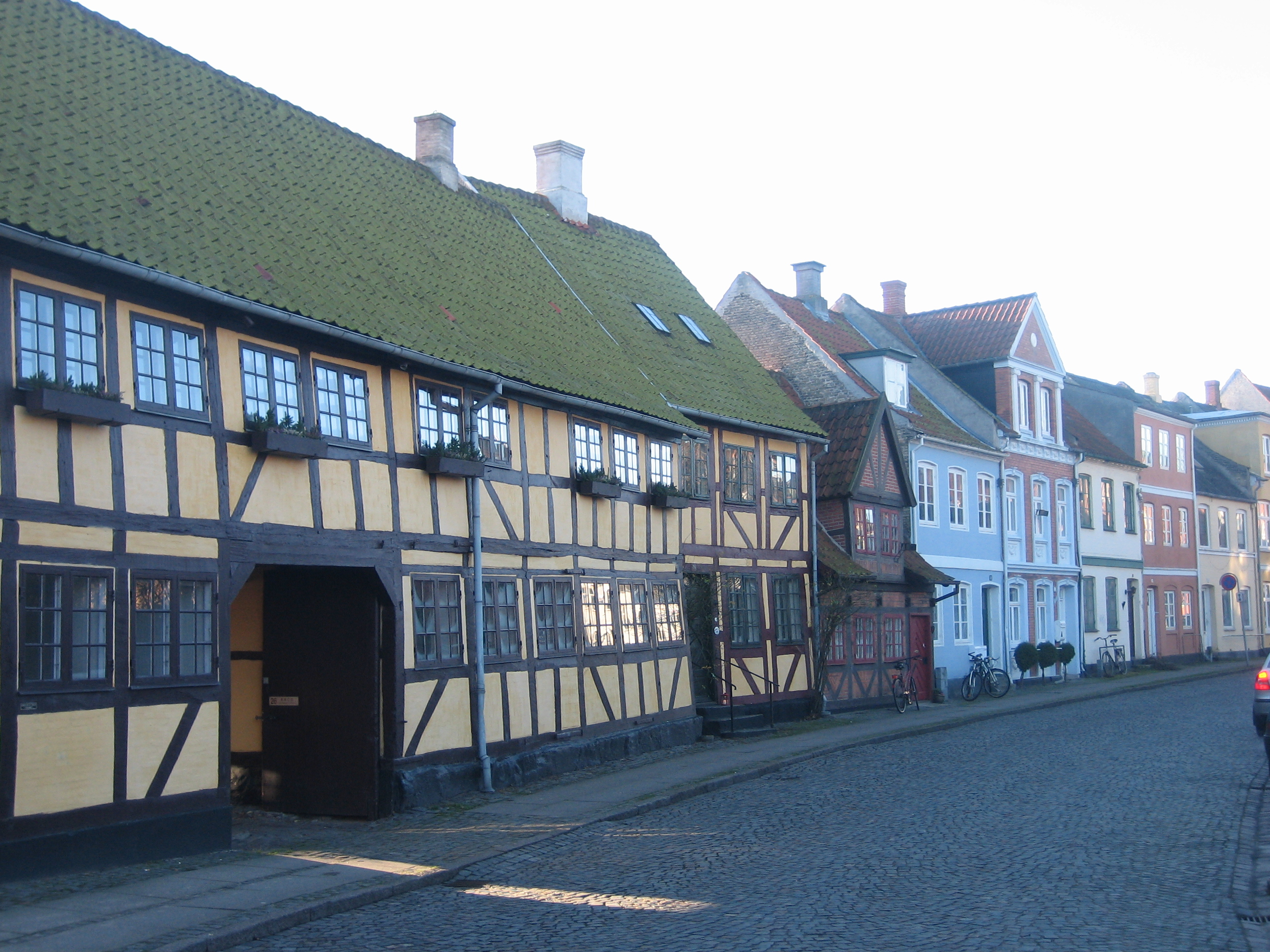
A street in the center of Nyborg.

The area around Nyborg's main hall is a pedestrian zone, containing a big variety of shops and facilities. North of the center of Nyborg, is Nyborg Cemetery. Further north are a series of larger shops and supermarkets, as well as Nyborg Hospital. A series of industries, including larger companies such as Trioplast, are located in Pilshuse. Nyborg's recycling center is also located here. In Nyborg Marina are a variety of sailing cooperations. By Nyborg's train station and the motor way exit is a series of fast-food restaurants, gas stations and grocery stores, as well as industries, including Daloon. At the motorway exit is also an indoor public swimming pool and a sports- and recreation center. A series of hotels are located along the north-eastern shore of the city, facing the Great Belt Strait. Nyborg Prison is located on Vindingevej.

Nyborg Cemetery has been used as a cemetery since 1537, where it was used for victims of the black plague. A chapel was built on the cemetery in 1605, but torn down again sixty years later in 1665 when the fortifications of Nyborg city were being expanded. Parts of these fortifications eventually became a part of the cemetery, with cemetery expansions in 1816, 1833 and 1855. A new chapel was built in 1870 and in 1900 a residence for the gravedigger was built on the grounds. In 1950, permissions to expand the cemetery further was approved, another part of the fortifications becoming part of the cemetery. These fortifications were not to be removed, however. The expansion was finished in 1957, with the fortifications used as burial sites and the ground below for urns. The cemetery today covers 30,673 m^{2}. A book about the cemetery was written in 2013. It was named after a piece from a newspaper from 1886, naming Nyborg Cemetery as the most beautiful cemetery on Fyn.

==== Nyborg Prison ====
Nyborg Prison is a closed state prison, located on Vindingevej in the outskirts of the city of Nyborg. Construction was approved by the city council in 1911, and the prison was finished in 1913. Among the locations suggested as the location of the prison was Nyborg Castle, though Minister of Justice Frits Bülow did not find the castle suitable for a prison. The prison was built by Victor Nyebølle, and intended to house young prisoners of both genders. To make this work, the prison was built as two separate buildings. Many new methods were tested during the prison's early years, including mandatory sport and education. It has been a closed state prison since 1973. Today it employs around 225 people, with around two-thirds being correctional officers. The prison offers many different jobs for the inmates, as well as a variety of educations.

=== Ullerslev ===
Ullerslev is located 10 kilometers to the north-west of Nyborg. It has a population of 2,706 people (2020). Before the 2007 Municipal Reform, this was the seat of Ullerslev Municipality. The forests of Kirsebærhaven, Bondemose Skov and Skovmærket are located in Ullerslev. In the town of Ullerslev are several shops, as well as industries, including a dairy factory. Ullerslev Church is located here.

=== Ørbæk ===
Ørbæk is located 14 kilometers south-west of Nyborg. It has a population of 1,691 people (2020). Before the 2007 Municipal Reform, this was the seat of Ørbæk Municipality.

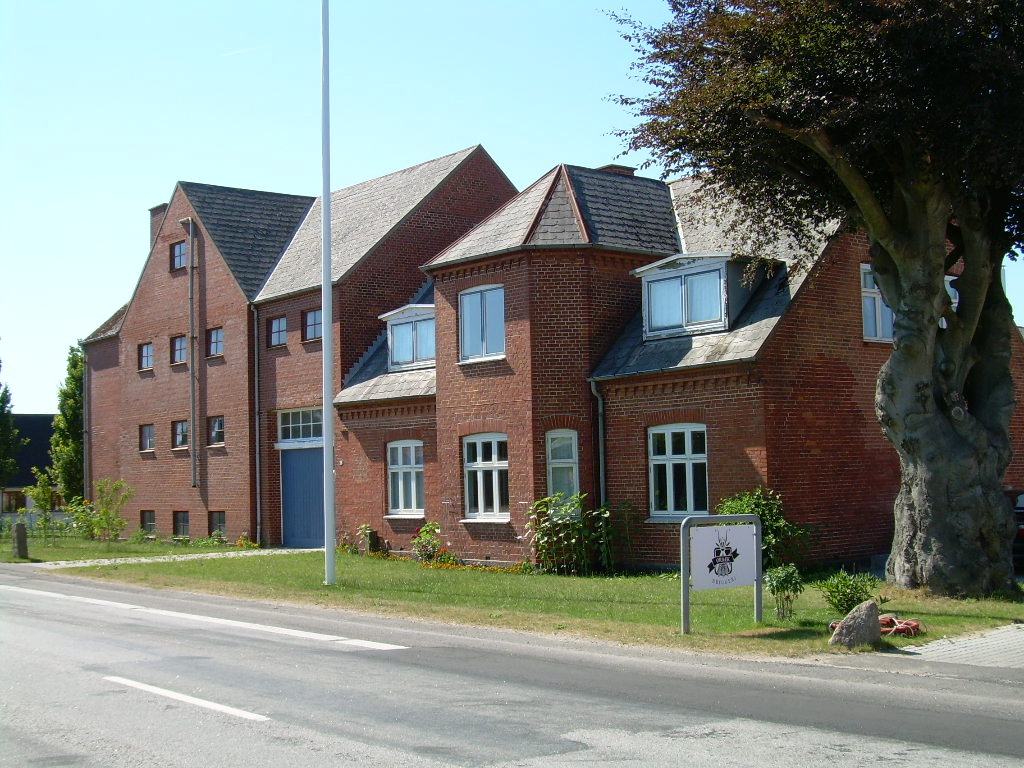
Ørbæk Brewery

Ørbæk has many shops and facilities, including sports facilities and a library. Ørbæk Brewery is located in the town, and the manor of Ørbæklunde is located near the town. There are also dolmen and passage graves located near the town. Ørbæk hosts a large yearly market known as 'Ørbæk Marked'.

=== Villages ===
Aunslev, north-west of Nyborg, has been the location of several significant Viking-related archeological discoveries, including a piece of jewellery in gold, in the shape of Jesus. This figure is the oldest of its kind found in Denmark. In the village are also Aunslev Church and Aunslev Hospital, which is under the care of the church.

Hjulby is located north-west of Nyborg. Hjulby Church and Hjulby Lake are located here.

Vindinge is located west of Pilshuse in Nyborg. It has sports-facilities and is also home to Vindinge Church.

Refsvindinge is located south-west of Nyborg. In addition to Refsvindinge Church, Refsvindinge Brewery is also located in this village.

In addition to these villages, there are a number of smaller settlements in the municipality. These are all the settlements with populations of less than 200 people:

Andkær
Balsgyden
Birkemose
Biskopstorp
Blankenborg
Blæsenborg
Bovense
Bredemiste
Brændemose
Bynkel
Bækstrup
Bøgebjerg

Bøgeskov
Bønderskov Huse
Dinestrup
Drejet
Dyrehave Huse
Ellested
Elvid
Fiskerholt
Flødstrup
Gasseløkken
Gedsbjerg
Grydstrup

Hannesborg
Hedemarken
Hestehave
Højbjerg
Kabinettet
Kastel
Kildemose
Kinnemose
Kissendrup
Kogsbølle
Kokkehaverne
Kongshøj

Korkendrup
Kragelund
Kullerup
Kullerup Hede
Lamdrup
Langemose
Langtved
Langæble
Langå
Lindeskov
Lunden
Lunget

Madeholm
Magelund Huse
Malmose Huse
Margretelund
Miklenborg
Mullerup
Måreskov
Nederby
Nordenhuse
Nyenlund
Polen
Profithuse

Pårup
Regstrup
Ringholm
Rødehuse
Sentved
Skalkendrup
Skellerup
Skiftemose
Skovballe
Skovhave
Slipshavn
Slude

Sludebakken
Stenhave
Stivelshuse
Strandtved
Sulkendrup
Søgyden
Sønderende
Såderup
Tange
Tangå
Villumstrup
Visby

Æble
Øksendrup
Åhuse
Åløkke
Åmose
Åskov

== Nature ==
The municipality is home to many nature areas, namely forests, bogs, meadows and coast. Much of the municipality's nature is protected.

There are three small protected nature areas within the city of Nyborg, including a series of old linden trees and an open meadow. Inside the city is also Slotssøen - the lake and moat surrounding Nyborg Castle. The fortifications around Nyborg Castle is home to the purseweb spider, a rare spider in Denmark. It was previously thought to be extinct in Denmark, but was in 1994 rediscovered.

East of Refsvindinge is a water mill called Lillemølle, located by Ørbæk River. It was established in the start of the 1600s, and was until 1899 part of Holckenhavn Castle. It is privately owned today. The river and the tree-covered slopes have been protected since 1964. 10 acres around Lillemølle are protected.

Some of the manors in the municipality have parts of their territory protected. These include Ørbæklunde where 42 acres were protected in 1971, and Hindemae where 110 acres were protected in 1974.

Holckenhavn Fjord was protected in the 1970s and 1980s and covers an area of 150 acres. It acts as the southern border of the city of Nyborg, where it cuts into Nyborg Fjord.

Three areas in the municipality has been protected through the European Union's Natura 2000 project. These are Østerø Lake on Knudshoved, Kajbjerg Forest south of the city of Nyborg, and 5 lakes in Tårup Strand.

=== Knudshoved ===
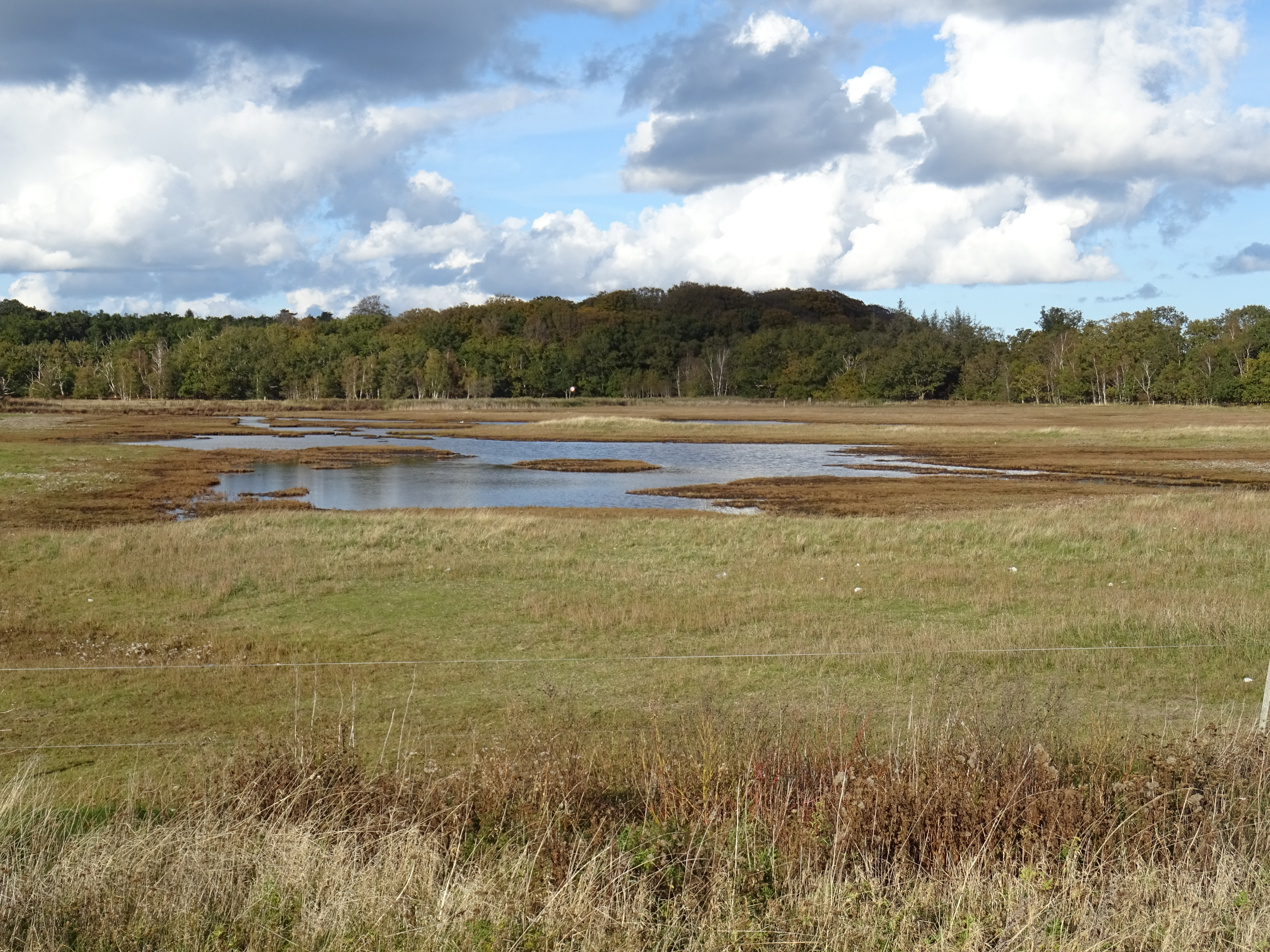
Beach meadows by Slipshavn.

Knudshoved, along with Slipshavn, make up a peninsula that creates a natural harbour in Nyborg Fjord. It is the easternmost point of Funen. It was protected in 2004, and the protection covers 210 acres. It consists of forests, beach meadows, reed beds, water holes and the lake of Østerø Sø. The Naval Home Guard of Denmark has a station on the Slipshavn peninsula. A sconce from the Second Northern War is also located on Slipshavn. There is also a lighthouse on Knudshoved.

In the Stone Age, the area of Knudshoved was shallow ocean, but has over time been transformed into the modern-day peninsula with beach meadows and lakes. The area has been transformed dramatically throughout history. It has been the location of ferry slips for the Great Belt ferries, piers, a golf course and the Great Belt Bridge. Much of the nature is still untouched, however. Parts of Knudshoved was protected in 1952 and the entire area in 2004.

Knudshoved's varied ecosystems allow a varied flora and fauna. The rare Bassia hirsuta (Danish: tangurt) and Inula britannica (Danish: soløjealant) can be found here.

It is also a breeding place for many ducks and shorebirds. In the autumn, the area is also a resting place for flocks of greylag goose. Kestrels hunts on the beach meadows. Knudshoved is also home to the natterjack toads, threatened in Denmark. There used to be a large colony of black-headed gulls on Knudshoved, but with the increased traffic on Knudshoved and Slipshavn over time, the population has decreased and they are no longer present in the area.

== Politics ==
On January 1, 2007 Nyborg Municipality was, as the result of the 2007 Municipal Reform, merged with Ørbæk Municipality and Ullerslev Municipality to form the new Nyborg Municipality. The agreement was for the entirety of the three municipalities to be merged, with the exception of Flødstrup Parish. Some locations around in Denmark would have to decide which municipality to go under, with the many changes in the 2007 Municipal Reform. The population of Flødstrup Parish voted on 30 March 2005 to decide whether to join Nyborg or Kerteminde Municipality. 315 voted to join Nyborg and 303 voted to join Kerteminde, resulting in Flødstrup Parish going under the new Nyborg Municipality.

On the table below is an overview of all elections held in Denmark since the 2007 Municipal Reform. The percentages in the table are the local results from Nyborg Municipality. The party with the most votes received is shaded in their respective color. In all but six elections since the municipal reform, the Social Democrats have been the largest party in the municipality. Venstre has been the largest party in the municipality on five occasions: in the 2013, 2017 and 2021 regional elections and in the 2017 and 2021 local elections. In the 2021 local elections the incumbent mayor Kenneth Muhs received one third of the votes in the municipality, with his party Venstre receiving more than half of all votes cast in the election. In the 2014 European Parliament election the largest party in the municipality became the Danish People's Party. This was the case in most of the country, and the first time in Denmark's history that the party had been the largest party in a nationwide election. The average turnout for general elections in Nyborg Municipality is 86.3%.

| Election | Percentage | | | | | | | | | | | | | Turnout |
|---|---|---|---|---|---|---|---|---|---|---|---|---|---|---|
| Election | A | B | C | D | F | I | K | N | O | V | Ø | Å | ... | Turnout |
| 2007 Folketing | 28.3 | 3.9 | 10.7 | — | 13.1 | 2.0 | 0.3 | — | 15.8 | 24.6 | 1.3 | — | 0.0 | 86.5% |
| 2009 EP | 27.6 | 2.5 | 15.7 | — | 13.2 | 0.3 | — | 5.6 | 15.0 | 17.8 | — | — | 2.2 | 61.0% |
| 2009 Local | 45.4 | 2.3 | 5.3 | — | 11.2 | — | — | — | 7.4 | 27.7 | 0.8 | — | — | 73.0% |
| 2009 Region | 35.8 | 2.9 | 8.4 | — | 14.4 | — | 0.2 | — | 8.1 | 25.8 | 1.2 | — | 3.3 | 72.8% |
| 2011 Folketing | 30.7 | 6.7 | 3.8 | — | 10.0 | 3.8 | 0.3 | — | 13.7 | 25.4 | 5.3 | — | 0.2 | 88.1% |
| 2013 Local | 38.6 | 2.2 | 2.9 | — | 4.9 | 1.5 | — | — | 10.3 | 31.6 | 4.4 | — | 3.6 | 77.3% |
| 2013 Region | 31.8 | 4.0 | 3.5 | — | 4.5 | 1.7 | 0.2 | — | 11.2 | 34.1 | 5.9 | — | 3.0 | 77.1% |
| 2014 EP | 22.3 | 3.5 | 14.7 | — | 7.7 | 1.7 | — | 7.5 | 28.0 | 14.5 | — | — | — | 57.0% |
| 2015 Folketing | 33.5 | 2.2 | 2.6 | — | 3.4 | 5.1 | 0.3 | — | 23.8 | 19.0 | 6.9 | 3.2 | — | 86.2% |
| 2017 Local | 30.4 | 1.2 | 1.5 | 0.5 | 4.9 | 0.7 | — | — | 8.0 | 47.4 | 3.3 | 1.0 | 1.0 | 77.7% |
| 2017 Region | 26.8 | 2.1 | 3.2 | 0.8 | 13.9 | 1.4 | 0.2 | — | 12.0 | 33.5 | 4.1 | 1.4 | 0.4 | 77.4% |
| 2019 EP | 27.4 | 7.1 | 6.3 | — | 11.4 | 1.8 | — | 4.4 | 12.1 | 22.6 | 4.6 | 2.4 | — | 65.4% |
| 2019 Folketing | 34.3 | 5.0 | 5.2 | 2.3 | 5.6 | 1.5 | 0.8 | — | 9.6 | 25.2 | 5.6 | 2.2 | 2.7 | 84.3% |
| 2021 Local | 27.7 | 1.8 | 3.3 | 2.0 | 7.0 | 0.4 | — | — | 2.0 | 51.9 | 3.2 | — | 0.7 | 73.9% |
| 2021 Region | 25.9 | 4.2 | 7.7 | 4.6 | 6.4 | 1.0 | 0.9 | — | 4.3 | 39.2 | 4.3 | 0.4 | 0.9 | 67.7% |
Data from Kmdvalg.dk

=== Municipal council ===
Nyborg's municipal council consists of 25 members, elected every four years. The municipal council has nine political committees.

Below are the municipal councils elected since the Municipal Reform of 2007.

| Election | Party | | | | | | Total seats | Turnout | Elected mayor |
|---|---|---|---|---|---|---|---|---|---|
| Election | A | C | F | O | V | Ø | Total seats | Turnout | Elected mayor |
| 2005 | 11 | 1 | 1 | 1 | 11 | | 25 | 73.5% | Jørn Terndrup (V) |
| 2009 | 12 | 1 | 3 | 2 | 7 | | 25 | 73.0% | Erik Skov Christensen (A) |
| 2013 | 11 | | 1 | 3 | 9 | 1 | 25 | 77.3% | Kenneth Muhs (V) |
| 2017 | 9 | | 1 | 2 | 13 | | 25 | 77.7% | Kenneth Muhs (V) |
| 2021 | 8 | 1 | 2 | | 14 | | 25 | 73.9% | Kenneth Muhs (V) |
Data from Kmdvalg.dk and Statistikbanken.dk

=== Mayors ===
Since the 2007 municipal reform, the mayors of Nyborg Municipality have been:

| # | Mayor | Party | Term |
|---|---|---|---|
| 1 | Jørn Terndrup | Venstre | 2007–2009 |
| 2 | Erik Skov Christensen | Social Democrats | 2010–2013 |
| 3 | Kenneth Muhs | Venstre | 2014–present |

== Economy ==
The largest industries by number of employees in Nyborg Municipality are social institutions, retail and education. The 7 hotels in the municipality also employ a large number of people.

Large companies with their headquarters set in Nyborg include Daloon, a company producing spring rolls and similar food products. Another company with their headquarter in the municipality is Tenax Sild, a company producing herring and fish products. Koppers has a refinery in the outskirts of Nyborg.

== Demographics ==
Historical population
| Year | Pop. | ±% |
|---|---|---|
| 2007 | 31,508 | — |
| 2008 | 31,607 | +0.3% |
| 2009 | 31,714 | +0.3% |
| 2010 | 31,690 | −0.1% |
| 2011 | 31,499 | −0.6% |
| 2012 | 31,486 | −0.0% |
| 2013 | 31,350 | −0.4% |
| 2014 | 31,314 | −0.1% |
| 2015 | 31,573 | +0.8% |
| 2016 | 31,886 | +1.0% |
| 2017 | 32,142 | +0.8% |
| 2018 | 32,032 | −0.3% |
| 2019 | 32,042 | +0.0% |
| 2020 | 32,009 | −0.1% |
| 2021 | 31,933 | −0.2% |
Source: Statistikbanken.dk

There are 32,009 people living in Nyborg Municipality (2020). 50.63% are women and 49.37% are men. 81.46% of the municipality are members of the Church of Denmark.

Below is the age distribution of the municipality.

Age
1. 0–5 (5.46%)
2. 6–17 (14.1%)
3. 18–35 (16.9%)
4. 36–64 (39.2%)
5. 64+ (24.4%)

== Education ==
There are 4 ground schools, 1 efterskole and 5 independent schools in the municipality, as well as 1 youth school and 2 special schools. There is also 1 gymnasium, 1 folk high school, 1 vocational school and 1 music school.

There are 3 libraries in the municipality, with Nyborg Library acting as the municipality's main library. Nyborg Library is located next to Nyborg Castle, with the castle's moats on two sides and open green areas on the other two sides. It was built in 1935 by Flemming Lassen and Erik Møller and the interior design was done by furniture designer Hans J. Wegner and architect Arne Jacobsen.

== Sights ==
The city of Nyborg is heavily characterised by its history as a garrison city and a former royal residence. In addition to the sights listed below, there are also a series of statues and sculptures found in the city. The most well-known of these is known as Den med Fisken (English: The One with the Fish) by Harvey Martin, located next to the moat on Østerhavn.

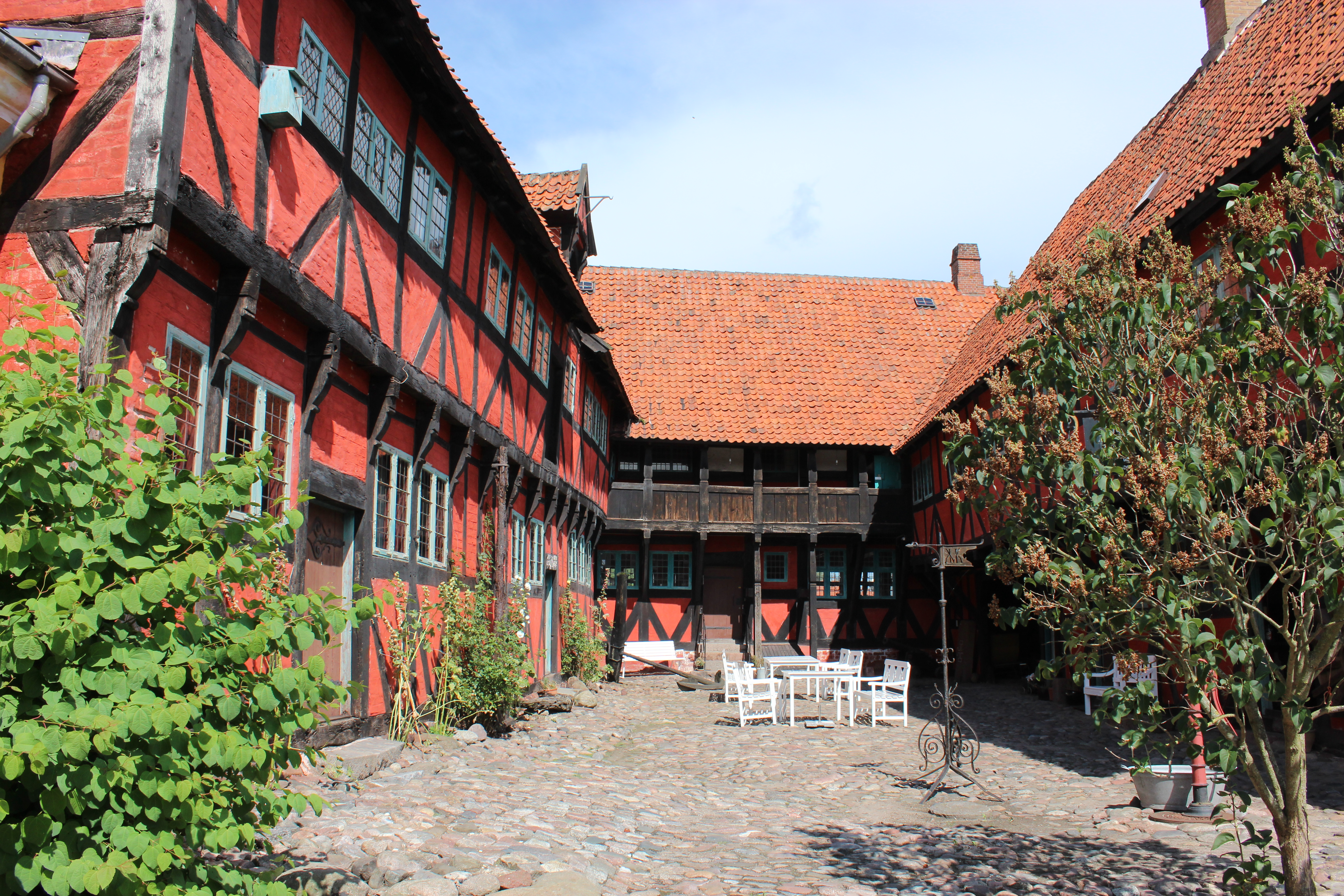
Mads Lerche's House.

- Mads Lerche's House (Danish: Mads Lerches Gård), with the associated museum Mayor's House (Danish: Borgmestergården), is a building located in the center of Nyborg. It was built in 1610 by merchant and Nyborg's mayor Mads Lerche, where it acted as his residence. The building has had many different uses since its construction. From 1916 to 1922, the building was renovated and from then on has been used as a museum. It also houses the city's library until 1939.
- The Bastion (Danish: Bastionen), also known as the Industrial Hotel (Danish: Industrihotellet), Citizen Community's House (Danish: Borgerforeningens Hus) and Nyborg Theater (Danish: Nyborg Teater), is a building located on the easternmost bank of Nyborg Castle's moat in the center of Nyborg. It was built in 1897, and has previously acted as a seat for the German invaders in World War 2, and later as a jazz club and disco. It has since 2017 been a cultural house.

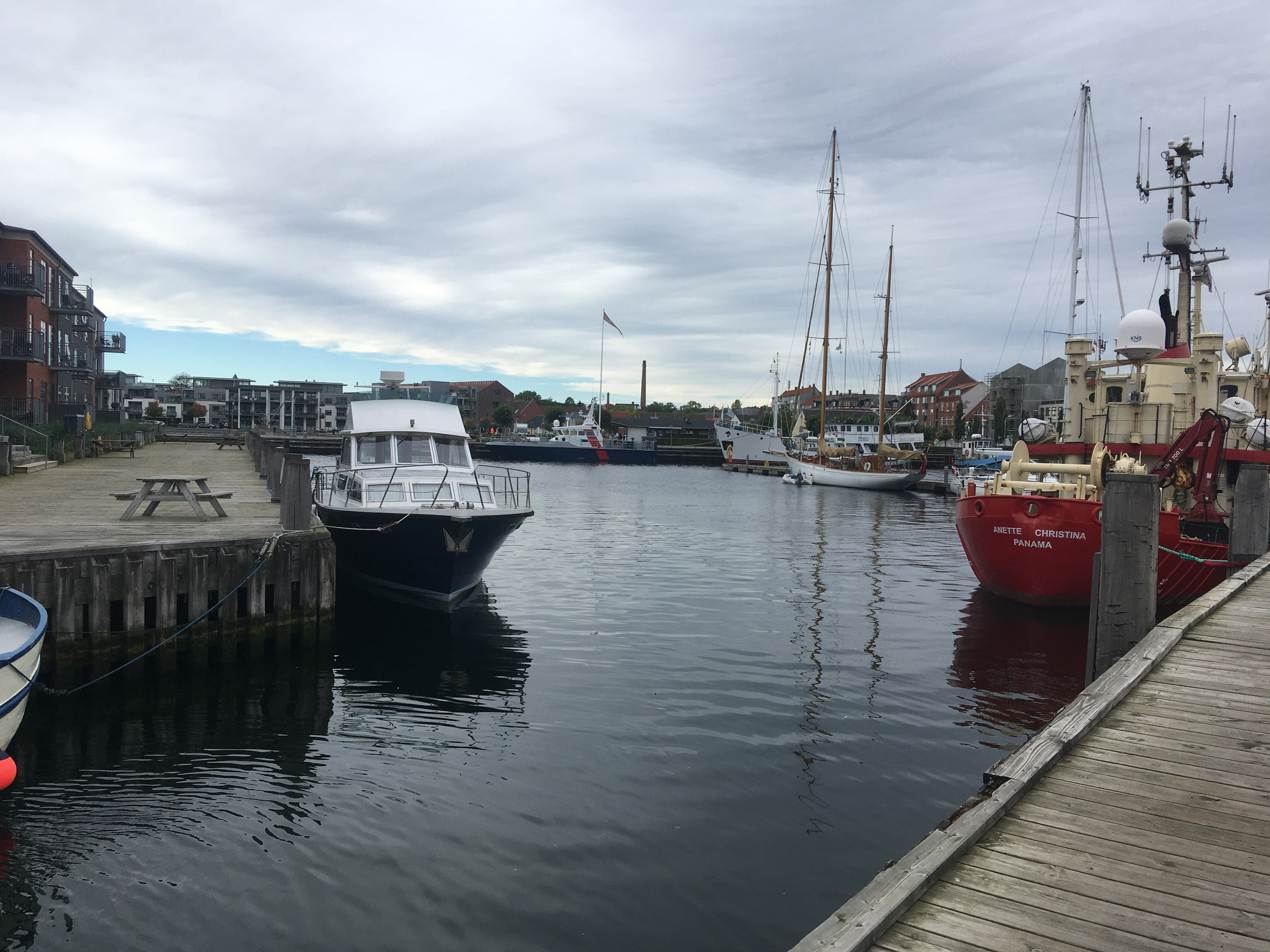
East Harbour of Nyborg Marina.

- The White Virgin (Danish: Den Hvide Jomfru) is a remnant of a dam fortification, and a single white pillar. A local legend says that Rigborg Brockenhuus was immured in the White Virgin.
- Nyborg Marina was established in 1929. It includes a small industrial harbour (Fishery Harbour, Danish: Fiskerihavnen), a harbour exclusively for dinghies (Dinghy Harbour, Danish: Jollehavnen), the West and East Harbours (Danish: Vesterhavn, Østerhavn) and a harbour for small motorboats (Channel Harbour, Danish: Kanalhavnen). The marina can house around 500 boats in total.
- Dyrehave Windmill is located in the south-western outskirts of Nyborg, near Holckenhavn Castle. It was built in 1858 and is 25 meters tall, making it one of the tallest windmills in Denmark. In 2018 it was bought by Realdania with the intentions of making the mill usable again.
- Nyborg Distillery is located in the former DSB train workshops near East Harbour. In 2017, the old buildings were turned into a whiskey distillery, with an associated restaurant.
- The City Gate (Landporten) was the main entrance into Nyborg city, and the only way inside after dark until 1869. The current version of the gate is from 1666. The road leading up to the gate from the outside of the city is known as Lindealléen. Trees were planted on this street in 1806.
- Five passage graves are located in the forest by the village of Sulkendrup, one of which collapsed only a few years after having been built sometime during the Stone Age. Despite the collapse, the passage grave were continued to be used to bury the dead. Sulkendrup Passage Grave (Sulkendrup Jættestue) is today open to the public, after having been renovated in 2014, to prevent it from collapsing.
- Lindeskov Burial Mound (Lindeskov Langdysse) is the longest burial mound in Denmark, with 168 meters in length. It is located near Lindeskov, and originates from the Stone Age. There are several other burial mounds in the area.
- Knudshoved Lighthouse (Danish: Knudshoved Fyr) is located on Knudshoved and was built in 1948. A lighthouse had been located on Knudshoved since the 1700s.
- Nyborg Town Hall is located near Nyborg Castle, and was built in 1799 and expanded in the 1800s.

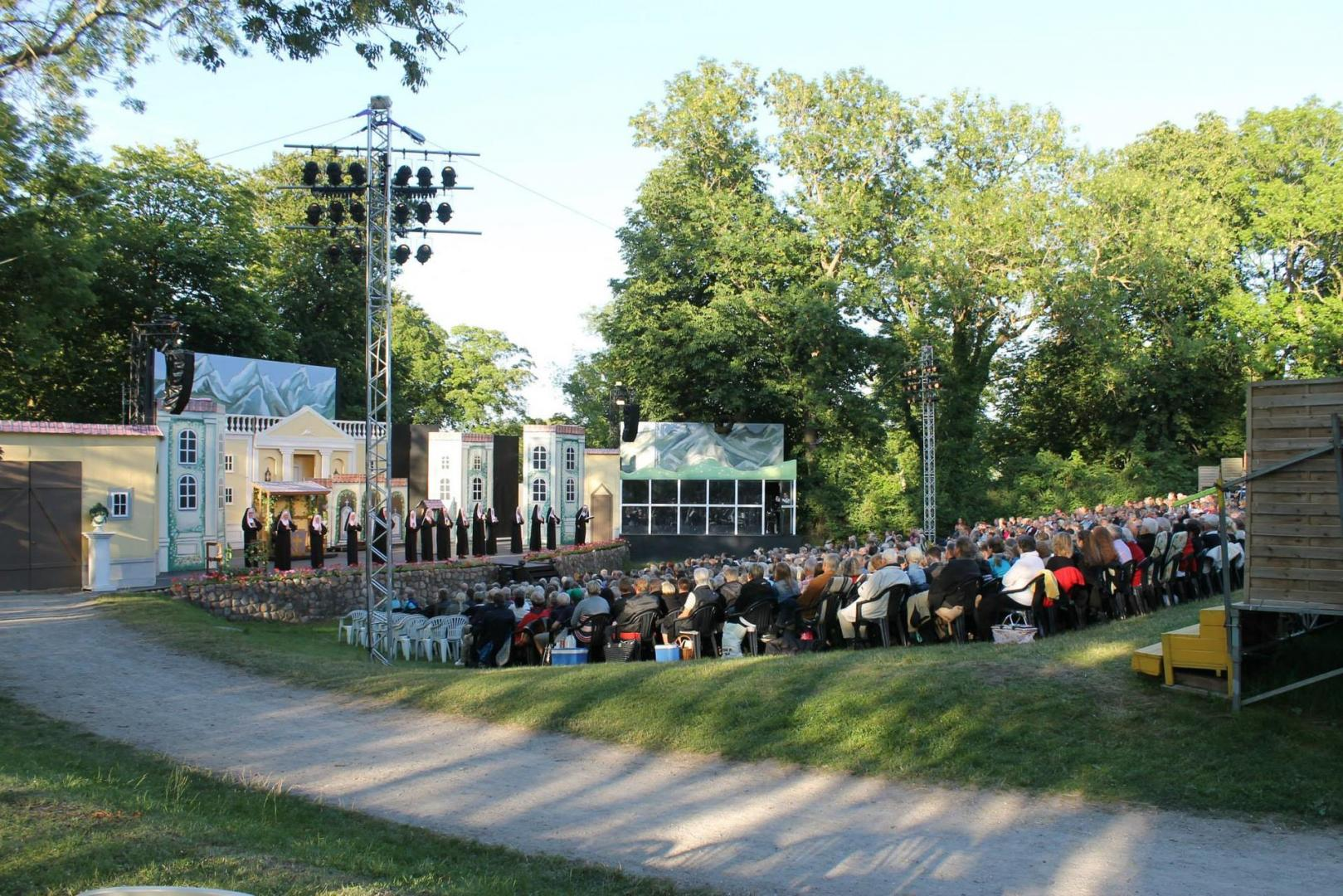
Nyborg Voldspil.

- Nyborg Voldspil is an open-air theatre on the fortifications around Nyborg Castle. It first started in 1939, where it performed an original play named Danehof i Nyborg (Danehof in Nyborg). Many well-known Danish actors have started their career in Nyborg Voldspil, including Thomas Eje, Jakob Sveistrup, Julie Lund and Ulrich Thomsen.

=== Castles and manors ===
There is a large amount of castles and manors on the island of Funen. Many parks and forests owned by the manors are open to the public, or used for private hunting. Many castles are used for events and hotels.

- Juulskov is a manor located 6 kilometers west of Nyborg, and owns 187 acres. The first mention of Juulskov is from 1365, and the main building was built in 1590 and rebuilt in 1797. After a fire in 1862, it became necessary to rebuild the main building again.

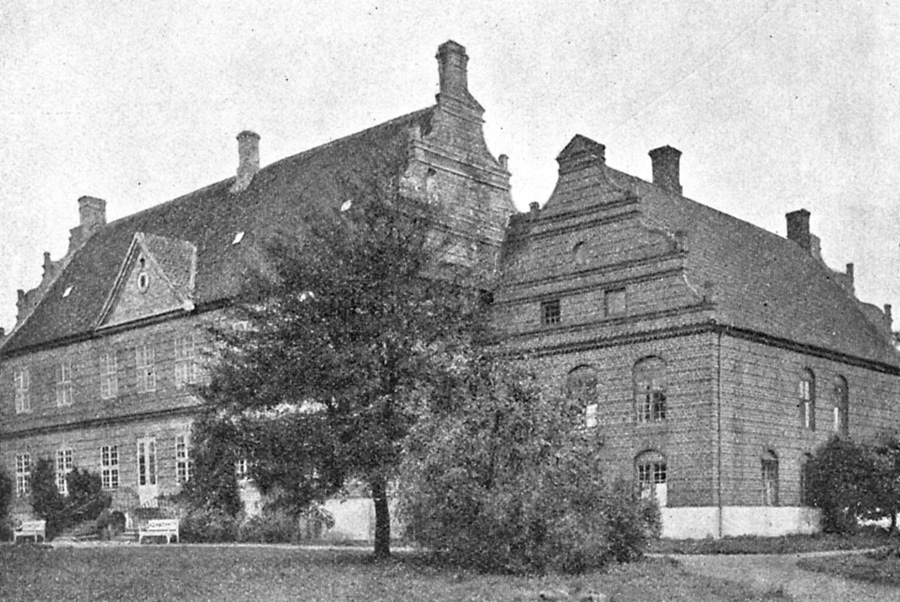
Juulskov manor

- Juelsberg is a manor located north-west of Nyborg, and owns 901 acres. The manor was constructed around the year 1200, by order of the crown. During the Dano-Swedish War, the manor's castle was entirely destroyed and the crown decided to sell the manor rather than rebuild it. They sold it to Norwegian-born Claus Rasch in 1669. Claus Rasch eventually gained a seat on Nyborg's city council and ended up with a significant amount of influence over the city and the surrounding areas. Claus Rasch expanded Juelsberg's possessions significantly. In 1723, the manor was sold to Hans Adolph von Ahlefeldt, who also owned Sprogø, adding the island to Juelsberg's possessions. In 1776, the owner of Juelsberg was Amalie Christiane Raben who finished renovations of the manor's main building. When she died in 1803, her son, Knud Frederik Juel, inherited the manor. He sold the island of Sprogø to the Danish postal services in 1814. Juelsberg lost a portion of land in 1925 due to the 'estate replacement law'. Today, Juelsberg acts as a hotel.
- Hindemaegaard is a manor located south of Ullerslev, and own 212 acres. The first mentions of Hidemaegaard is from 1320. The manor was owned by the Urne family until 1605, when Breide Rantzau inherited it. In 1725, the manor was sold and for fifty years it changed hands many times. In 1778 it was bought by Ove Johan Vind Hindemaegaard, who built the current main building in 1790. He sold it in 1801 to Charles Adolph Denys Mourier, who made large improvements to the manor. A wind mill from 1806 is part of the manor.
- Risinge is a manor located near the coast, bordering the Great Belt Strait and Kerteminde Bay. It is located south of Kerteminde and north of Nyborg. It owns 349 acres. It was originally a farmhouse from around 1526, and the main building wasn't built until 1661–1664, when owner Jens Madsen Rosenberg expanded the manor. Jens Madsen Rosenberg would later become mayor of Nyborg. Today the manor acts as a hotel and as a location for events.
- Rørbæk is a manor located in the village of the same name, south of Kerteminde and north-west of Nyborg. It owns 181 acres. It is first mentioned in 1438, and was owned by the Qvitzow family for the first few hundred years. Henning Qvitzow, who owned Rørbæk, was Fyn's master of supplies during the Seven Years' War. The manor lost a lot of territory in 1925, after the 'estate replacement law'.
- Ravnholt is a manor located north-east of Ringe, south-west of Nyborg and south of Langeskov. It owns a total of 2619 acres, including Lykkesholm Castle's 299 acres. The manor was first mentioned in 1365. In 1567, the manor was owned by Vibeke Podebusk, who expanded the manor significantly by buying neighbouring lands and farms. Vibeke Podebusk was furthermore a renowned author, writing important pieces like "Antegnelser om danske Sager fra 1464 til 1573", giving insight into the nobility's lives from that time. The manor was inherited by Niels Bild, who continued his mother's work by expanding the manor even further, gaining more farms and territory by trading with the king. In 1707, the manor was owned by Charlotte Amalie Gersdorff and the Danish Minister of Foreign Affairs, Christian Sehestedt. They decided to move to Ravnholt, and made large improvements on both the manor but also the neighbouring villages and towns, building a hospital in Herrested and adding a chapel to the manor. Christian Sehestedt Juul owned the manor in 1833, and sold much of the manor's remote territory, and instead buying nearby lands. When he died, the manor was inherited by Ove Sehestedt Juul and Emilie Holsten, who decorated the manor with art and expensive furniture. Otto Bache was a friend of the couple, and many of his pieces still decorate Ravnholt. During this time, large hunting events were held. Because of this, the couple bought more forests and released boars into the wild. The manor has since then been the host of many hunting events, and still offer those today.

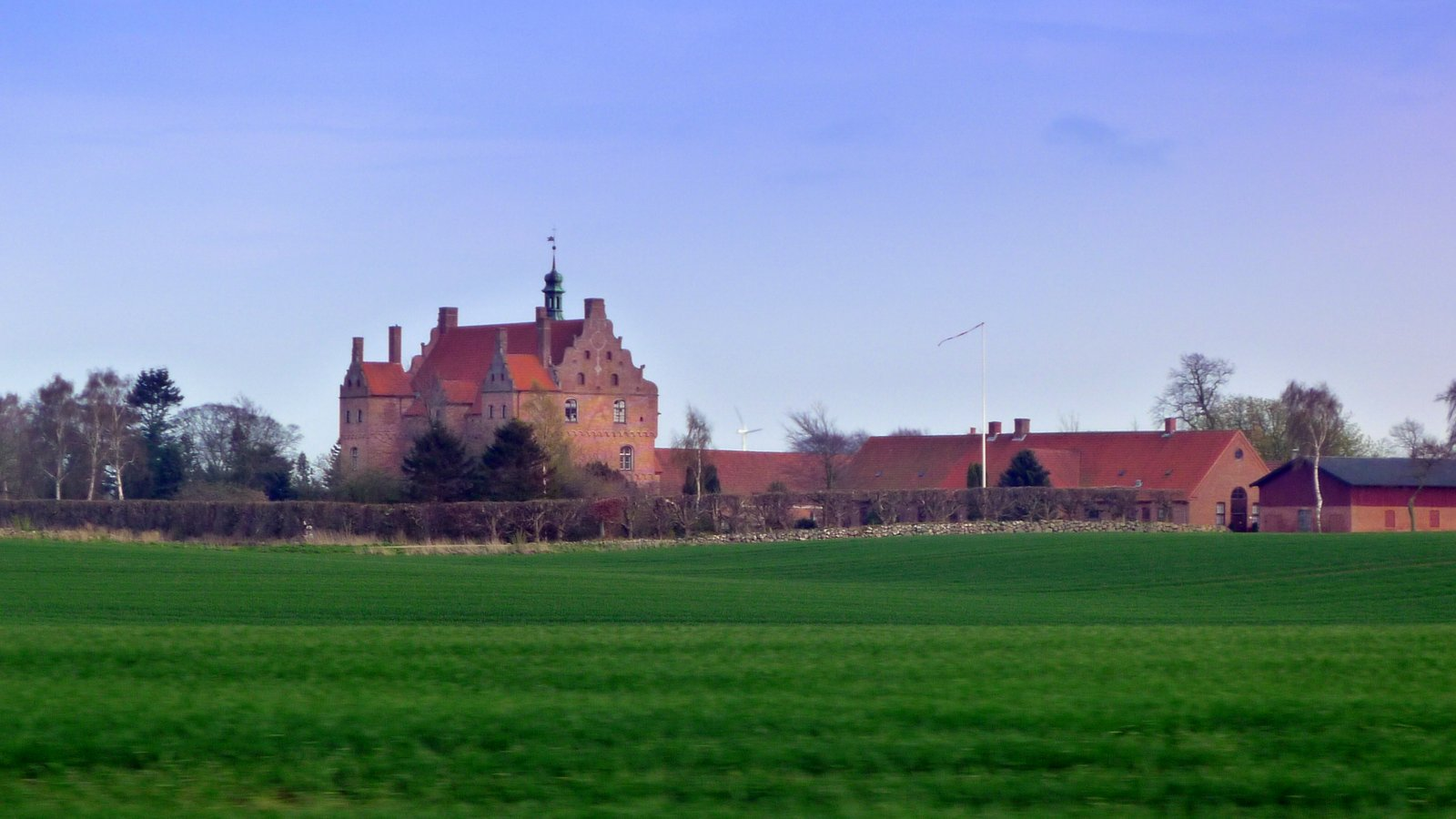
Ørbæklunde manor.

- Ørbæklunde is a manor located south of Ørbæk, and own 687 acres. The manor is first mentioned in 1500, but it wasn't until 1638 that the owner, Jesper Friis, expanded the manor's territory. In 1781, the manor was bought by Lars Rasmussen Lange, whose descendants still own the manor today.
- Anhof is a manor located south of Nyborg, and own 206 acres. The manor is from around 1529. The main building is from 1885, and rebuilt in 1916.

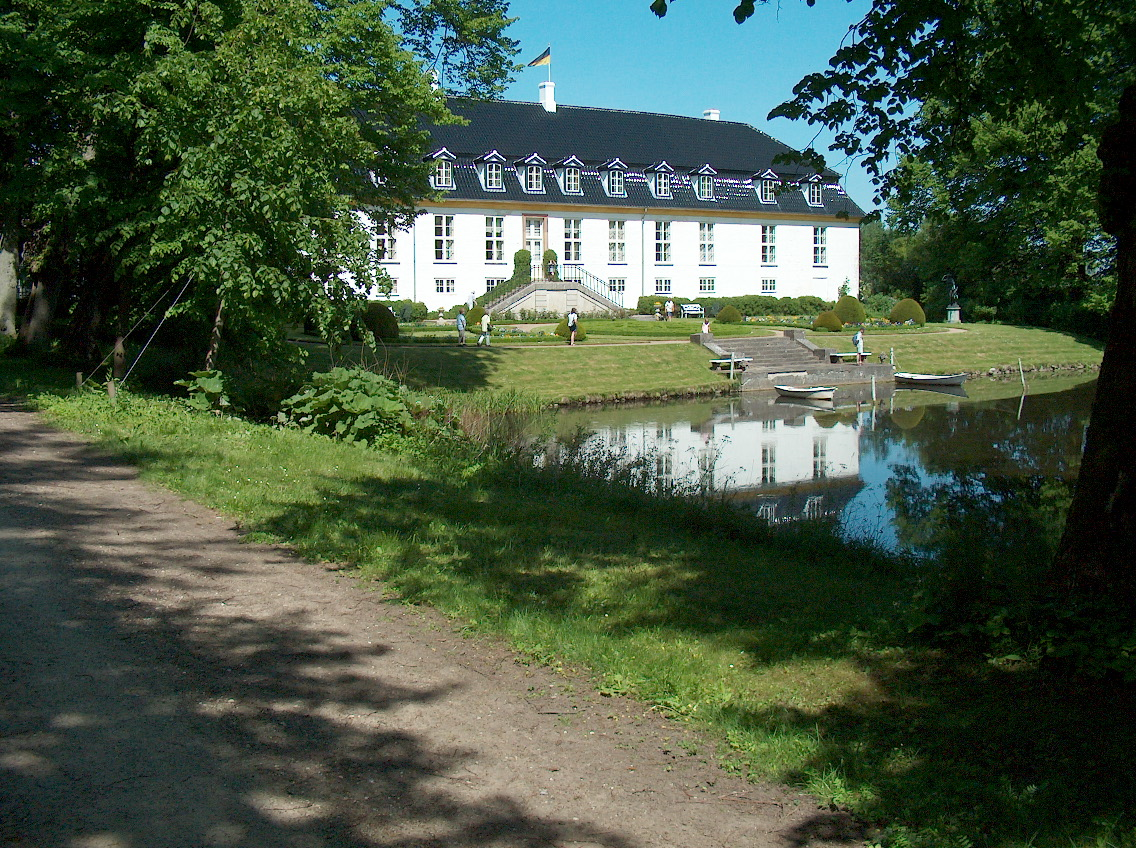
Glorup manor.

- Glorup is a manor located south of Nyborg and north of Svendborg. It owns 755 acres. It was first mentioned in 1390. Christoffer Valkendorf owned the manor in 1562, and made attempts to expand the manor's territory, eventually adding all of Svindinge Parish under Glorup. In the 1570s, he also built Svindinge Church, as well as a new main building for Glorup. In 1625 the manor was owned by Henning Valkendorf, who also expanded the territory of Glorup. He added the village of Brenderup to Glorup's territory, as well as several other nearby manors. Adam Gottlob Moltke bought the manor in 1762, and made large renovations on the manor's buildings. The Moltke-Huitfeldt family still own the manor today. The manor's parks and forests are open to the public, and they host hunting events.
- Rygaard is a manor located south of Nyborg and north of Svendborg. It owns 377 acres. It was first mentioned in 1372. From 1766, it was owned by the neighbouring Glorup manor, and still is today.

==== Nyborg Castle ====
Nyborg Castle is located near the center of Nyborg city, and is surrounded by fortifications, the 'castle lake' and a moat that runs along the center of the city. The castle was first mentioned in 1193, when Canute VI held a meeting in it. Before then, the king was housed in Hjulby, outside Nyborg, and the castle was established in that period. A curtain wall was built, and there has likely been several wooden buildings within the walls. In the first half of the 1200s, a building was constructed in two floors, much of which still remains today. The king likely held his meetings in the upper floor of this construction. During the 1300s and 1400s, the castle was improved upon, with a new floor and several new buildings. In 1282, Eric V completed the constitution of Denmark in Nyborg Castle. In 1287, Eric V's alleged murderers were sentenced on the castle. In the 1520s, Frederick I planned to make Nyborg his official residence, but that never happened. Signs of his plans were obvious, however, with major projects on the castle planned.

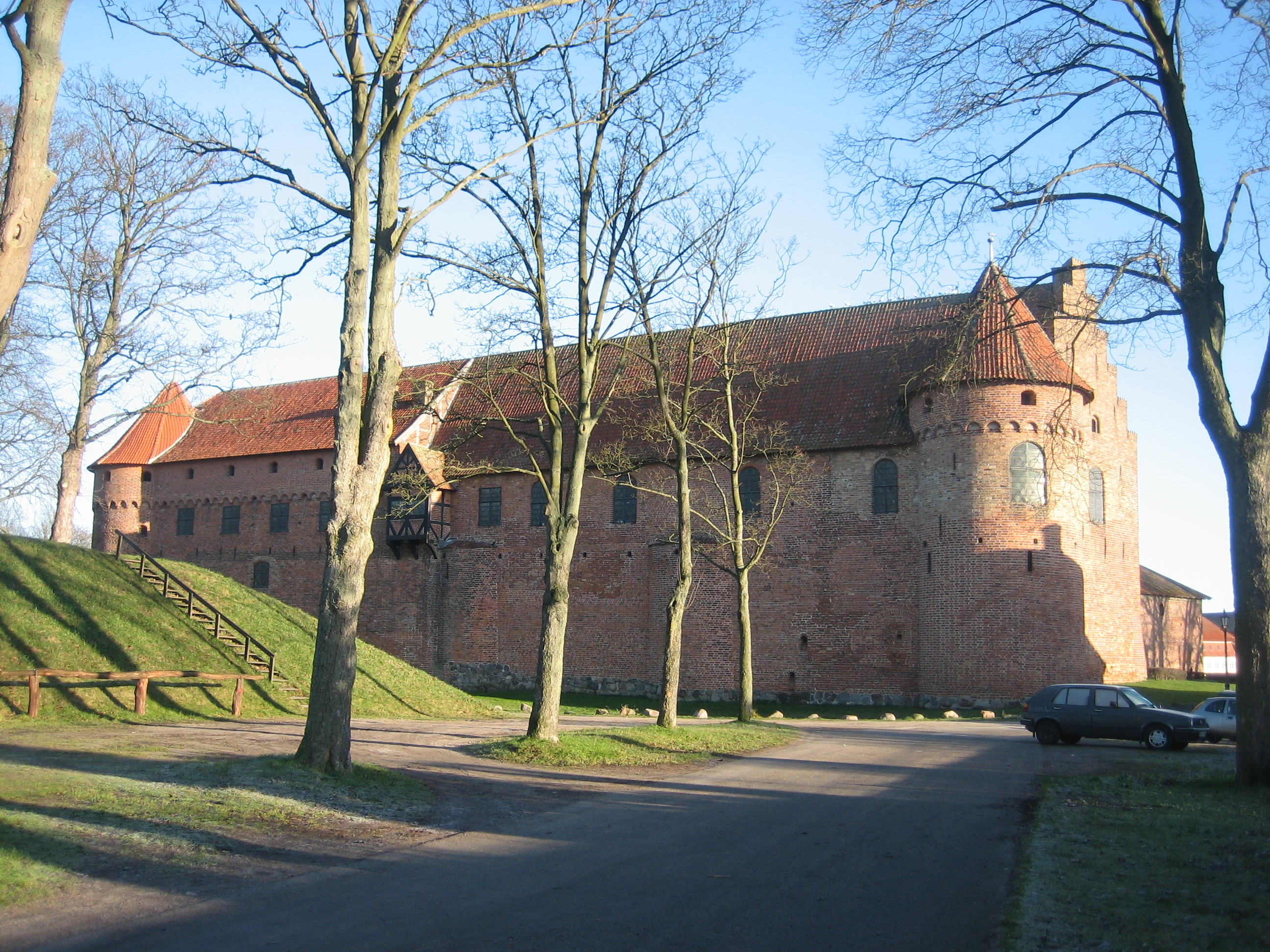
Nyborg Castle.

The castle was captured by Swedish troops during the Dano-Swedish War, following the Battle of Nyborg. The Swedish troops sent all valuables home to Sweden, while they burned much of the furniture. Following this, the king was no longer interested in living in the castle, and it was handed over to the military. Nyborg worked as a garrison, with the castle now being used for military purposes. Much of the castle was no longer needed as was taken apart, and the materials used to build fortifications. The castle was used as armoury and storage.

After the garrison was disestablished in 1913, the castle was turned into a museum, which it has been since then. In 2017, a large project to renovate and expand the museum was begun, with plans to finish in 2021.

The fortifications, ramparts and moats surrounding Nyborg Castle stretch out along the center of the city. The moats appear as they did in the Middle Ages, with the same water regulation systems still in use. Three of the original bulwarks still exist, with the remaining having been torn down during city expansions. Two of those bulwarks are located around Nyborg Castle, and are known as the Queen's Bulwark (Danish: Dronningens Bastion) and the Crown Prince's Bulwark (Danish: Kronprinsens Bastion). Those are surrounded by the original ramparts, which today act as park areas. On the Queen's Bulwark is a water tower from 1899, built by Emil Swanenflügel. The water tower was protected in 1997. The third bulwark is called Prince Carl's Bulwark (Danish: Prins Carls Bastion), and is slightly smaller. It also acts as a park area.

==== Holckenhavn Castle ====
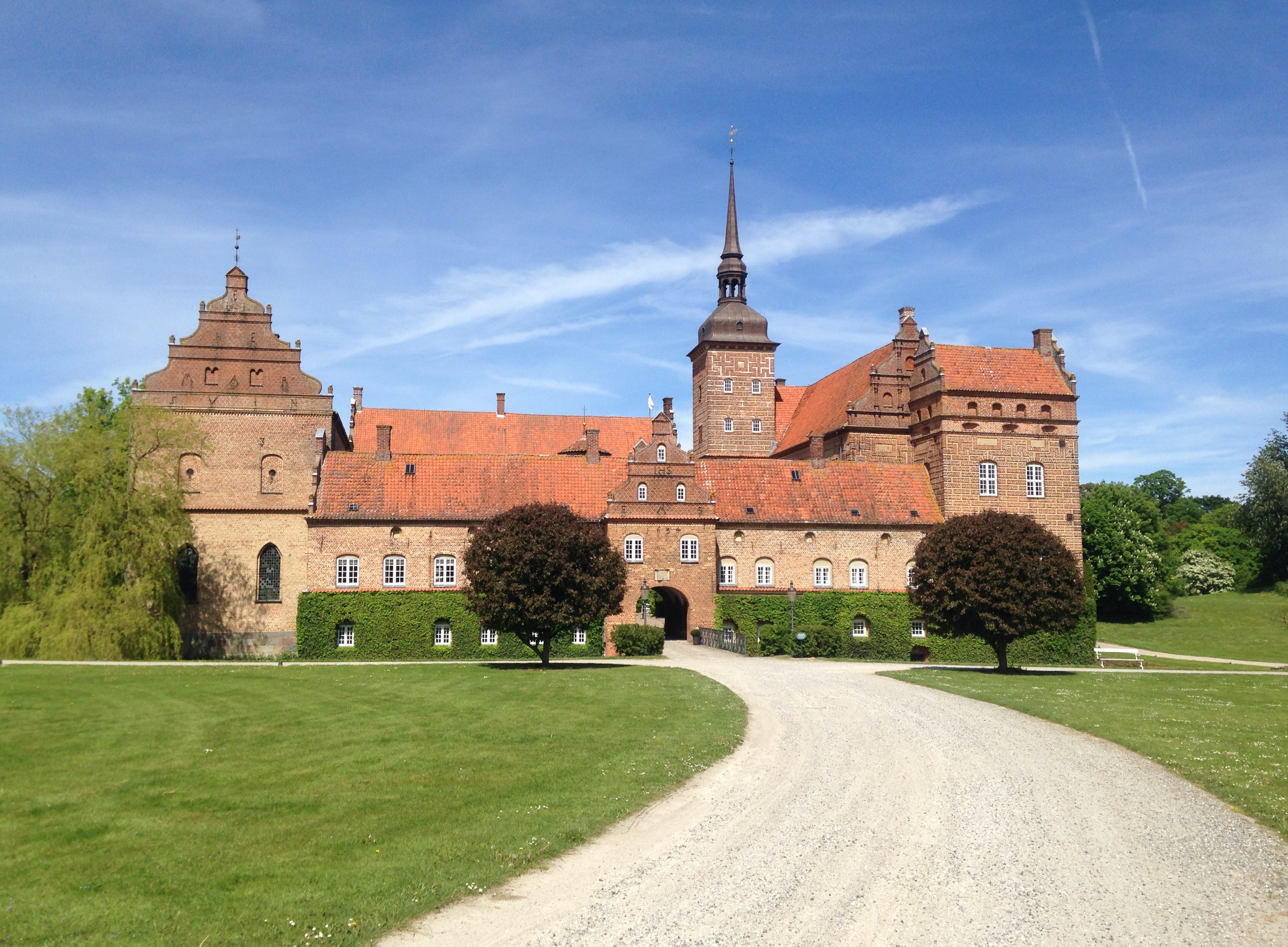
Holckenhavn Castle.

Bordering the city of Nyborg to the south is the Holckenhavn Castle. The castle owns 900 acres, and perform forestry, farming, hunting and renting out of residential houses. The castle itself can be rented for weddings and similar events, and also have hotel-services. The manor originates from around the late 1300s, where it was owned by Anders Jacobsen Ulfeldt. The manor was kept in the Ulfeldt family, and in 1534-1536 during the Count's Feud, the manor was owned by Knud Ebbesen Ulfeldt, who defended the castle of Gjorslev on Sjælland against the peasants. He supported Christian III after the war. Knud Ebbesen Ulfeldt died in 1540, and the manor was given to his son, Corfitz Ulfeldt. He, however, was secretary at the Danish chancery, and the day-to-day management of the manor was instead performed by his mother, Anne Eriksdatter Hardenberg. Jacob Ulfeldt gained the manor after Anne Eriksdatter Hardenberg's death in 1564. Jacob Ulfeldt fought under both Herluf Trolle and Daniel Rantzau in the Seven Years' War. After performing well in the war, he was sent to Russia as a delegation, but failed to improve Denmark's relationship with Russia. This upset the king, and Jacob Ulfedt spent the rest of his days taking care of Holcekhavn Castle. He made large improvements, and expanded the manor significantly during this time. In 1616, the manor was sold to Ellen Marsvin, who made big changes to the interior of the castle. During the Dano-Swedish War, the manor was owned by Leonora Christine and Corfitz Ulfeldt. Holckenhavn Castle was largely ignored by the Swedes, due to Corfitz Ulfedt's relationship with the Swedish king, and he later joined the Swedish army. After the war, Corfitz Ulfeldt escaped to Germany to avoid the charges for treason, while Leonora Christine was imprisoned. In 1672, Holckenhavn was awarded to Eiler Holck, after his success in the Dano-Swedish War. The war had taken its economical toll on the manor though, and it wasn't until 1760 that the owner Erik Rosenkrantz Holck managed to turn this around. The manor has been owned by the Holck family since then.

==== Lykkesholm Castle ====
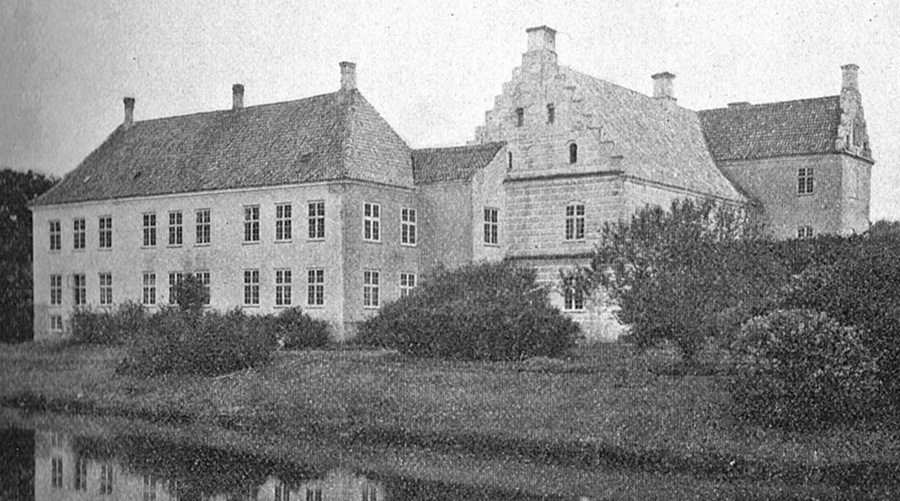
Lykkesholm Castle.

Lykkesholm Castle is located near Ørbæk, where it is used for events and hunting. The manor owns 299 acres. The castle was temporarily owned by Margaret I, who gave it away to Henneke Olufsen Bjørn a few days after acquiring it. Christen Thomesen Sehested acquired the castle in 1640, and began significant plans to expand the manor. He bought a large amount of surrounding farms, and even a church in a nearby village. He was given another series of farms after lending money to the king. He eventually became so rich that he was able to donate grain to poor children in Odense. After Sehested's death and the abolishment of absolute monarchy in Denmark, the manor ran into debt and were in financial trouble until 1730 when it was bought by Theodor Adeler, who turned things around. Anne Cathrine Bendtz got control of the manor in 1778, and she made significant changes to it, selling the parts they didn't need while also establishing new plantations and constructing new buildings. In 1914, Lykkesholm was bought by Christian Ove Sehestedt Juul from neighbouring manor Ravnholt, who still own Lykkesholm today.

=== Churches ===
See List of churches in Nyborg Municipality

=== Events ===
The yearly Ørbæk Market (Danish: Ørbæk Marked) began around year 1900, where it was mentioned as a market for livestock. The market was helt the 2nd Saturday in July in Ørbæk every year until 1957, where the industrialization meant that horses were no longer necessary. The yearly tradition stopped in 1957, but was brought back in 1980. The market was no longer solely for livestock, but now mainly a kræmmermarked - a type of flea market. The market has been held annually since 1980, and is the largest market on Funen.

The Danehof Market is a yearly renaissance fair held in Nyborg. It takes place the first weekend in July. It takes place around Nyborg Castle and the plaza outside the town hall. The market has its roots from the 1200s, where a yearly market was also held in the start of July.

== Sport ==
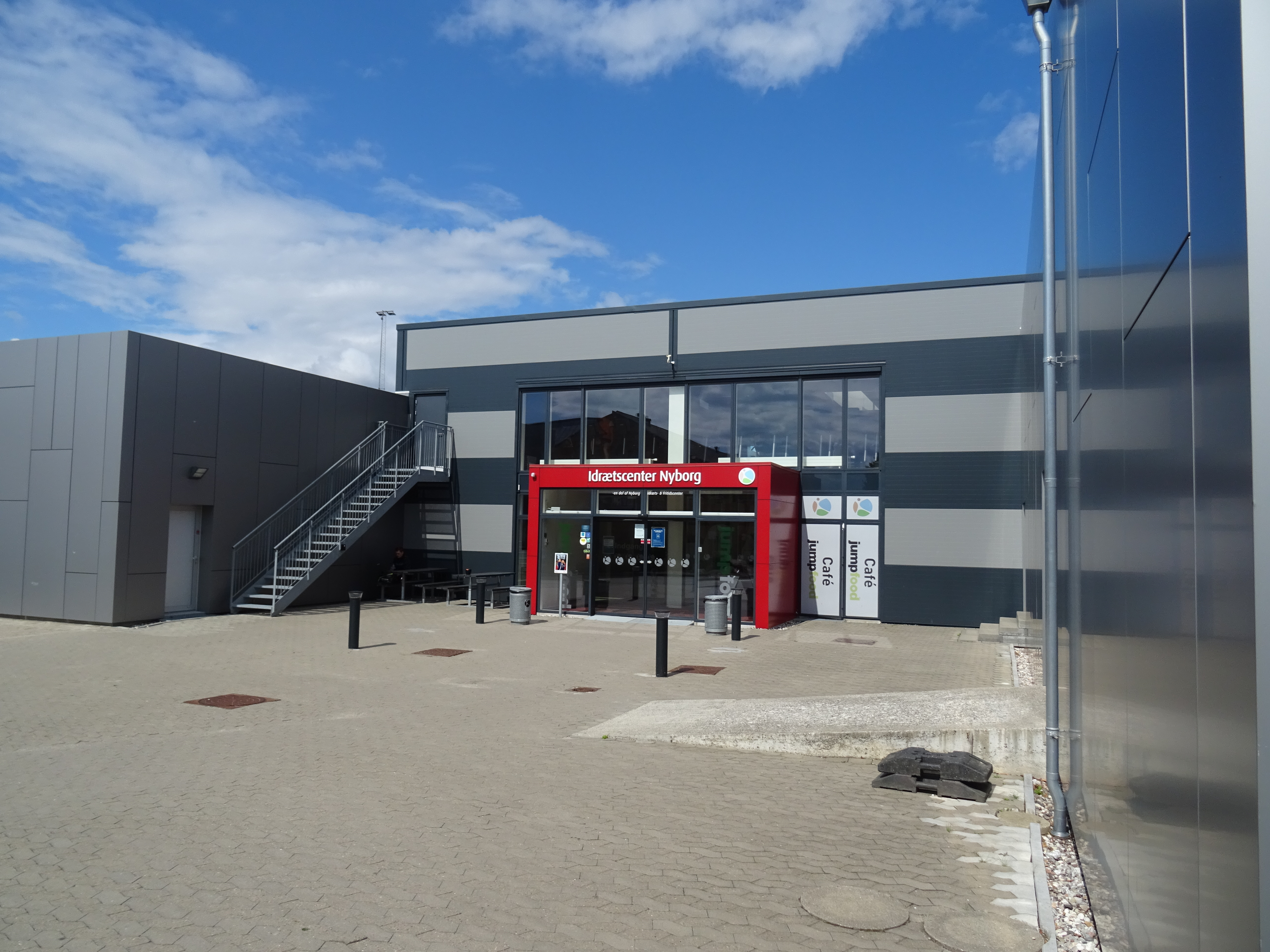
Entrance to the Nyborg Sports Center.

The municipality has an official leisure, culture and sport policy. It focuses on a tight relationship and cooperation between the municipality and the various organizations around the municipality.

The municipality is home to a sizable sports facility. This facility is called Nyborg Sports and Leisure Center (Danish: Nyborg Idræts- og Fritidscenter). This facility is home to a number of sports organizations. Sports represented in these organizations include fitness, badminton, handball, kayaking, bowling, rowing, tennis, diving, athletics, gymnastics, swimming, triathlon, petanque and volleyball. The main section of the Nyborg Sports and Leisure Center is located near the motorway exit in Nyborg, and is called Nyborg Sports Center (Danish: Nyborg Idrætscenter). In this facility are a number of swimming pools and an indoor water-fun-land. The Nyborg Sports Center is also home to an athletics stadium, used by athletics and gymnastics organization NGIF Gymnastics and Athletics (Danish: NGIF Gymnastik & Atletik), with around 750 members. It was founded on 20 November 1894. NGIF holds official training for the Bridge Run, which is a quarter or half marathon across the Great Belt Bridge. Also a part of Nyborg Sports and Leisure Center are two sports halls, known as the Nyborg Halls (Danish: Nyborghallerne). In these halls are facilities for badminton, handball and indoor association football. In the northern part of Nyborg is also the Skovpark Hall (Danish: Skovparkhallen), housing facilities for badminton, handball, volleyball and basketball.

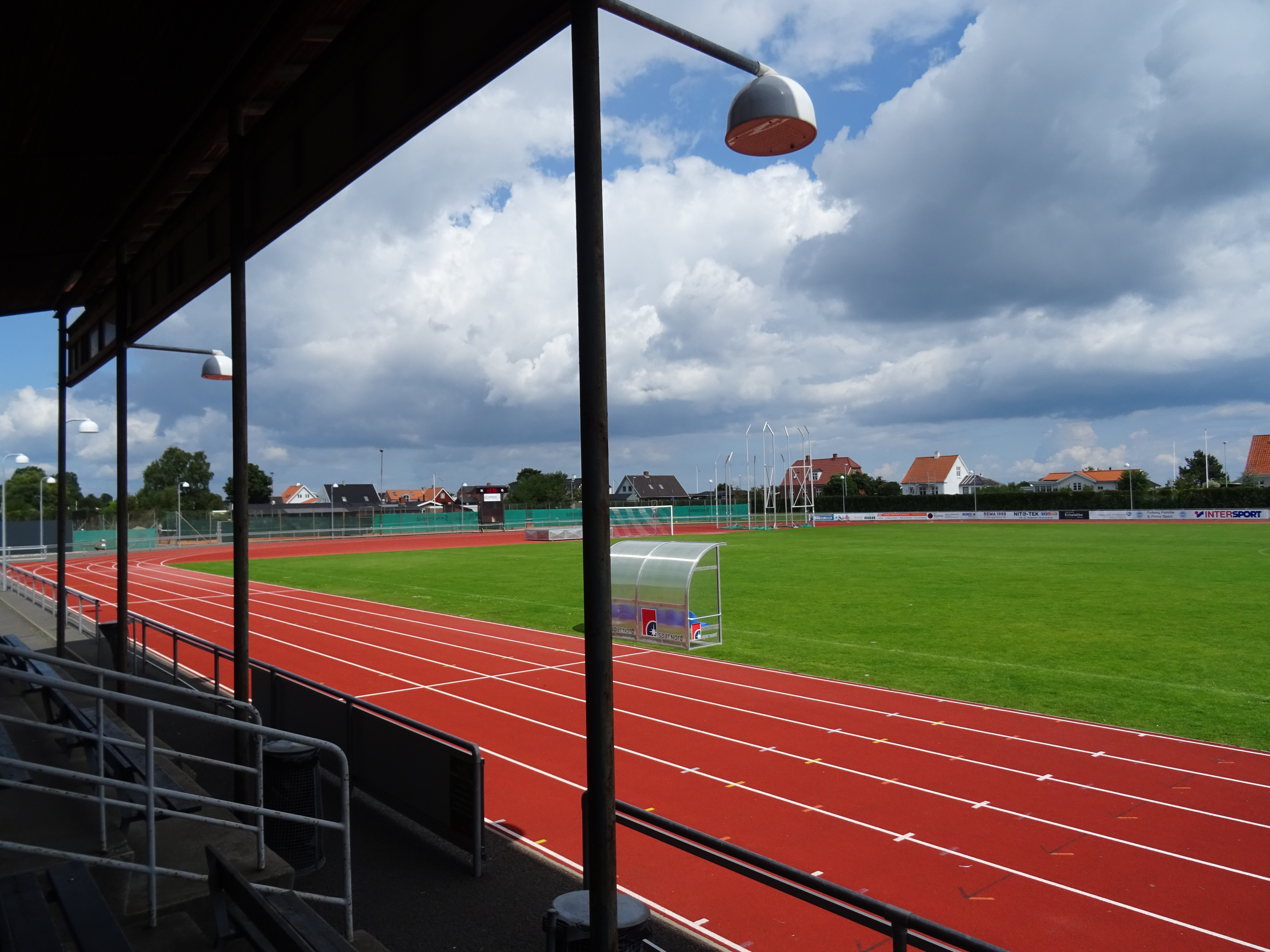
Athletics stadium at the Nyborg Sports Center.

Saint Canute's Golf Club (Danish: Sct. Knuds Golfklub) is a golf club located at Knudshoved. It was founded in 1954. The golf course consists of 18 holes, with holes 5 to 9 located on area owned by Nyborg Municipality. In 1959 the Danish National Championship in golf took place on Saint Canute's Golf Club's course, marking the first time this event was held outside Copenhagen. The golf club has around 800 members.

The maritime nature of the municipality results in popularity in maritime sports. Nyborg Marina and the fjord outside Nyborg are home to several organizations related to sailing, kayak and rowing. Among those is Nyborg Sailing Organization (Danish: Nyborg Sejlforening), sailing several different kinds of boats. The organization was founded in 1895, making it one of the oldest sailing organizations in Denmark. The first sailing races were held in Nyborg already in 1866. The organization hosts the Funen Championships in Finn (Danish: Fynsk Mesterskab for Finnjolle).

Many other sports are practiced and supported throughout the municipality. Fishery is popular, with locations around Slipshavn and central Nyborg acting as attractive fishing spots. Nyborg Sport Fishing Organization (Danish: Nyborg Sportsfiskerforening) also allows fishing in the moat around Nyborg Castle, though for a fee. Nyborg Castle Archery Guild (Danish: Nyborg Slots Buelaug) is an archery and crossbow organization. Other than regular sport archery, the organization also participates in the annual Danehof market at Nyborg Castle, with the intention of displaying medieval archery.

== Parishes ==
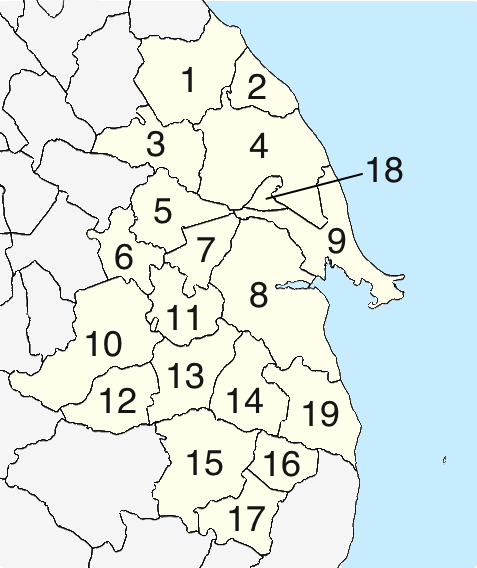
Parishes of Nyborg Municipality.

There are 19 parishes in Nyborg Municipality. Shown in the table below are the populations of each parish, as well as the percentage of that population that are members of the Church of Denmark. All numbers are from 1 January 2020.

| # | Parish | Population | % | Source |
|---|---|---|---|---|
| 1 | Flødstrup | 923 | 86.46 | |
| 2 | Bovense | 246 | 82.93 | |
| 3 | Ullerslev | 2,985 | 86.40 | |
| 4 | Aunslev | 1,282 | 84.40 | |
| 5 | Skellerup | 624 | 89.42 | |
| 6 | Ellinge | 462 | 89.61 | |
| 7 | Kullerup | 297 | 89.23 | |
| 8 | Vindinge | 3,614 | 82.32 | |
| 9 | Nyborg | 14,789 | 76.16 | |
| 10 | Herrested | 1,074 | 89.94 | |
| 11 | Refsvindinge | 932 | 86.70 | |
| 12 | Ellested | 232 | 89.66 | |
| 13 | Ørbæk | 1,846 | 90.41 | |
| 14 | Frørup | 776 | 86.73 | |
| 15 | Svindinge | 531 | 86.06 | |
| 16 | Langå | 285 | 84.56 | |
| 17 | Øksendrup | 266 | 85.34 | |
| 18 | Hjulby | 211 | 80.09 | |
| 19 | Tårup | 601 | 82.70 | |

== Symbols ==
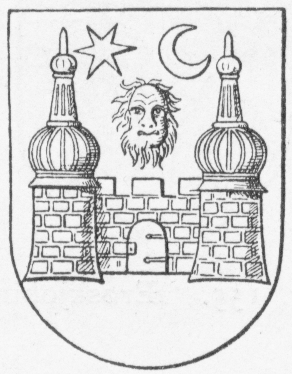
Modern coat of arms and logo of Nyborg Municipality (left). Old coat of arms of Nyborg from at latest 1894 (right).

The coat of arms and logo of Nyborg Municipality is a modern iteration of Nyborg's original coat of arms, which originates from the 14th century. The star and moon's origins are unknown, though believed to originate from Nyborg Church, which is dedicated to Virgin Mary. They are also symbols of eternity. The castle in the modern coat of arms is a simplified version of the castle on the old coat of arms. It represents Nyborg Castle. The king's head was originally a man's head, without the king's crown. The head began appearing in the 15th century and its origins are unknown. The king's head represents Erik Klipping, who signed the first Danish constitution at the Danehof in Nyborg Castle. The blue lines under the castle was not part of the old coat of arms. They illustrate the municipality's and the castle's adjacency to water. The gate is open, to illustrate hospitality.

== Notable residents ==
=== Nobility ===
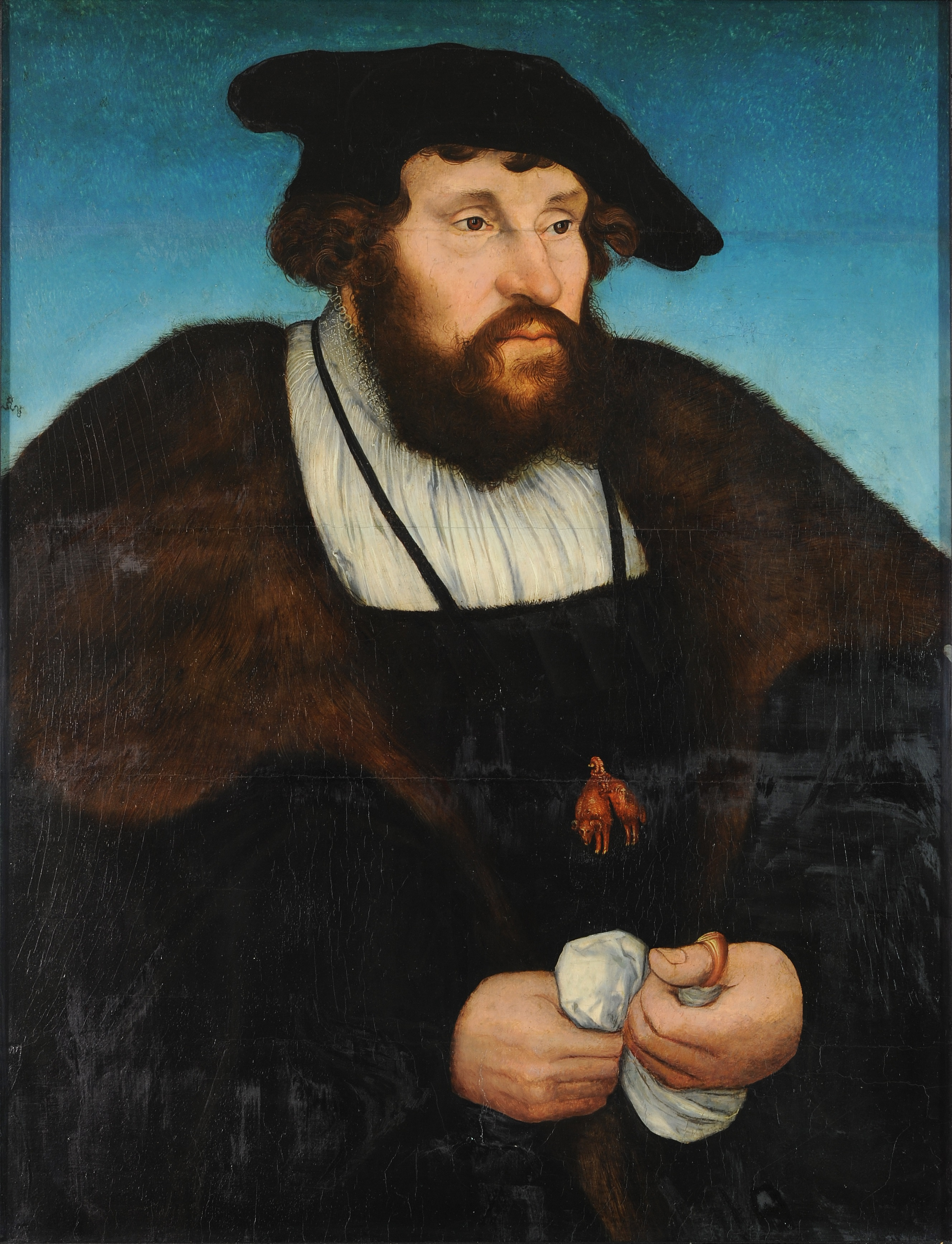
Christian II of Denmark

- Christian II of Denmark (1481 in Nyborg – 1559), king of Denmark, Norway and Sweden.
- Elizabeth of Denmark (1502 in Nyborg – 1535), electress of Brandenburg
- Christina of Denmark (1521 in Nyborg – 1590), princess and regent of Lorraine
- Christoffer Valkendorff (1525 on Glorup – 1601), statesman and landowner
- Rigborg Brockenhuus (1579 in Nyborg – 1641), noblewoman
- Karl Johann von Königsmarck (1659 in Nyborg – 1686), Swedish count

=== Public thought and politics ===
- Johan Theodor Holmskjold (1731 in Nyborg – 1793), botanist
- Ole Berendt Suhr (1813 in Nyborg – 1875), investor
- Thora Fiedler (1854 in Nyborg – 1941), nurse, prosthetist, inventor and nursing home principal
- Johannes Mollerup (1872 in Nyborg – 1937), mathematician
- Johannes Theodor Suhr (1896 in Nyborg – 1997), bishop
- Bodil Begtrup (1903 in Nyborg – 1987), women's rights activist
- Paul Neergaard (1907 in Nyborg – 1987), agronomist and agriculturist
- Jørn Terndrup (born 1947 in Nyborg), politician
- Jens Lauritzen (born 1953 in Nyborg), politician
- Erik Skov Christensen (born 1958 in Nyborg), politician
- Henrik Lund-Nielsen (born 1965 in Nyborg), entrepreneur
- Kenneth Muhs (born 1972 in Ørbæk), politician and mayor of Nyborg Municipality

=== Art ===
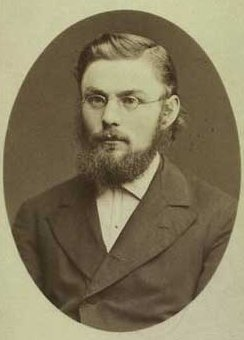
Carl Aarsleff

- Mette Magrete Tvistman (1741 in Frørup – 1827), clockmaker
- Carl Aarsleff (1852 in Nyborg – 1918), sculptor
- Thomas Laub (1852 in Langå – 1927), composer
- Sextus Miskow (1857 i Nyborg – 1928), singer
- Frederik Jensen (1863 in Nyborg – 1934), actor
- Johan Hye-Knudsen (1896 in Nyborg – 1975), musician
- Helge Kjærulff-Schmidt (1906 in Nyborg – 1982), actor
- Holger Juul Hansen (1924 in Nyborg – 2013), actor
- Erik Balling (1924 in Nyborg – 2005), film director
- Bjarne Henriksen (born 1959 in Såderup), actor
- Elsebeth Egholm (born 1960 in Nyborg), author
- Signe Svendsen (born 1974 in Nyborg), singer and participant of the Eurovision Song Contest 2001
- Søren Huss (born 1975 in Nyborg), singer

=== Sport ===
- Hans Jørgensen (1889 in Nyborg – 1955), rower
- Ragnhild Hveger (1920 in Nyborg – 2011), swimmer
- Leif Printzlau (born 1948 in Nyborg), football player
- Søren Skov (born 1954 in Nyborg), former football player
- Vilhelm Munk Nielsen (born 1955 in Ullerslev), former football player
- Lars Lunde (born 1964 in Nyborg), former football player
- Dorte Jensen (born 1972 in Nyborg), sailor
- Kathrine Heindahl (born 1992 in Nyborg), handball player
- Søren Toft Hansen (born 1992 in Nyborg), badminton player
- Frederik Søgaard (born 1997 in Nyborg), badminton player
