= Nyborg Town Hall =

Seat of Nyborg Municipality, Denmark

Coordinates: 55.3127°N 10.7902°E

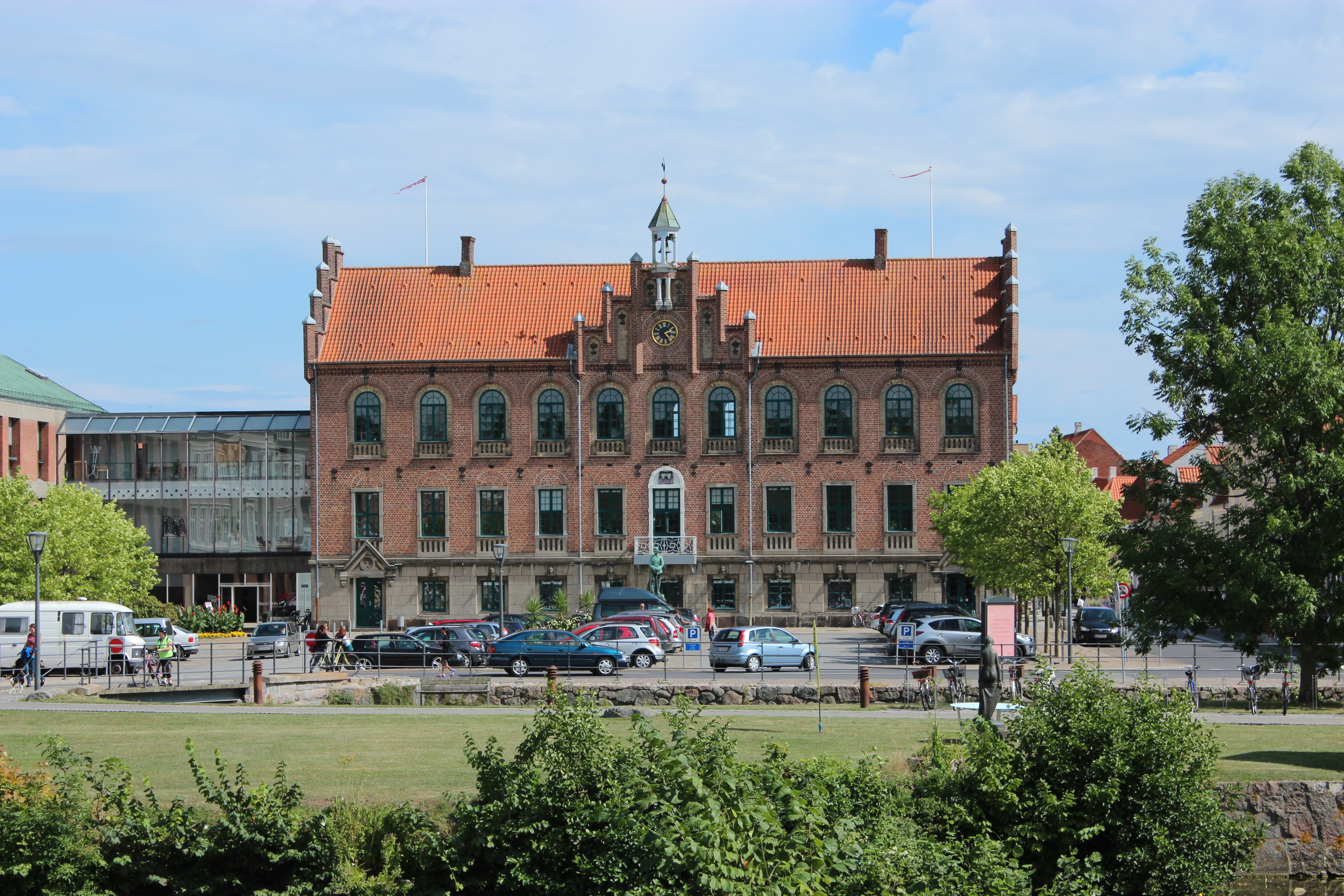
Nyborg Town Hall

Nyborg Town Hall is the seat of Nyborg Municipality on eastern Funen, Denmark.

== History ==
A town hall was built at the site in 1586. It was demolished in the 1790s to make way for the new town hall which was completed in 1799. Nothing is known of the appearance of the old town hall. The new building was designed in a Neo-classical style by an unknown architects. It was rebuilt after a fire in 1803 and remodelled in a Neo-Gothic style in 1883 by Vilhelm Tvede and again in 1899 by August Colding.

== See also ==
- Old Town Hall (Silkeborg)
