= Aunslev =

- Village
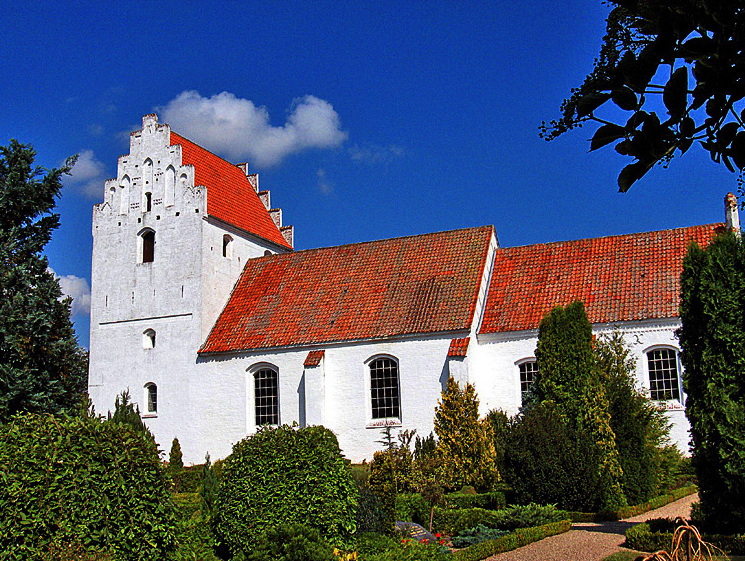
- Aunslev Church

- Location in the Region of Southern Denmark
- Coordinates: 55°21′24″N 10°43′57″E
- Country: Denmark
- Region: Southern Denmark
- Municipality: Nyborg

Population (2026)
  - Total: 422
- Time zone: UTC+1 (CET)
  - Summer (DST): UTC+2 (CEST)
- Website: Aunslev.dk

Aunslev is a village in central Denmark, in Nyborg Municipality on the island of Funen. Aunslev lies 10 kilometers north of Hjulby, 7 kilometers northwest of Nyborg and 32 kilometers east of Odense. The village belongs to the parish of Aunslev.

Aunslev has historically been divided into two villages, respectively Agnslev Overby and Agnslev Nederby, but the villages have today grown together. Overby and Nederby still exist as regions of the village.

== Etymology ==
The name of the village can be dated back to 1231, first mentioned as Agnslef. In 1998 the Ministry of Culture changed the spelling of the village to Aunslev from Avnslev. Up until this change city signs and local businesses used both spellings.

== History ==
Aunslev has been inhabited since the viking age, indicated by archaeological discoveries, such as a runestone and the Christ from Aunslev. The Christ from Aunslev is the oldest crucifix found in Denmark. It was found by a local villager, Dennis Fabricius Holm, who searched a field between the village and the church using a metal detector on 11 March 2016. The crucifix is a pendant necklace, with a height of 4.1 cm. and a weight of 13.2 g. The crucifix originates from the early 900s AD. Until this finding the Jelling Stones had been acknowledged as the first sign of Christianity in Denmark, why the Christ from Aunslev changes fundamental parts of the Danish history.

== Aunslev Church ==
Aunslev Church (also known as Sct. Blasius Church) was built around 1100. The Juel family, owners of the Juelsberg manor, are buried here. The altar is from the 1600s from Odense. The baptismal font is in undecorated Romanesque style, built in granite. It is the oldest piece in the church. The organ is from 1984 from Aabenraa. The church has four bells, two built in Copenhagen from 1734 and 1764. After the Second World War, the citizens of Aunslev collected money to buy a 'peace bell' for the church. The first bell didn't meet the expectations, so another was built. This was in 1968. Aunslev Hospital, located next to the church, is owned by the church. It is a former hospital, and later acted as a museum.
