= Hjulby =

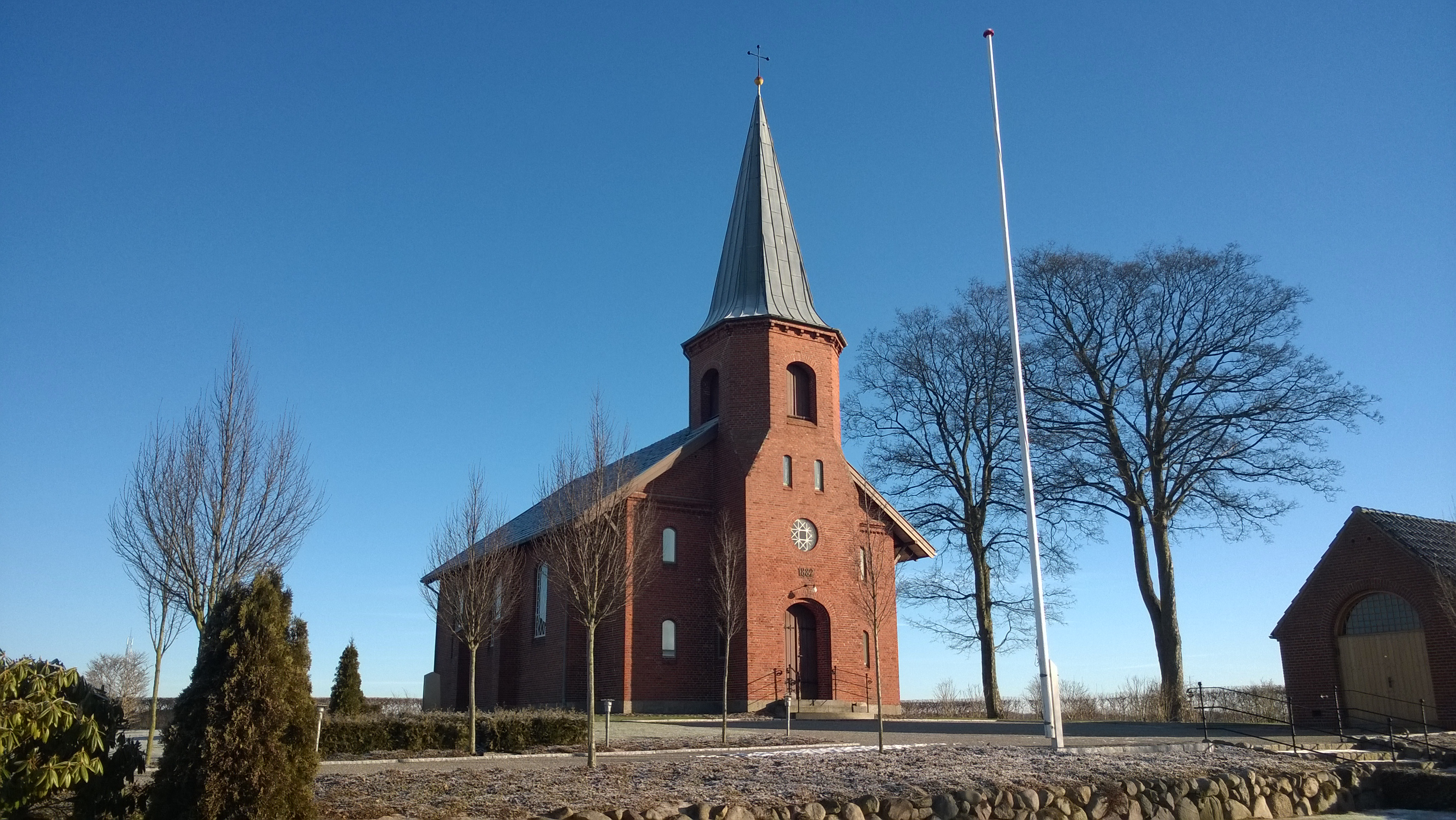
- Hjulby Church

- Location within Region of Southern Denmark
- Coordinates: 55°20′32.8″N 10°44′19.6″E
- Country: Denmark
- Region: Southern Denmark
- Municipality: Nyborg

Population (2026)
  - Total: 386

Hjulby is a village in central Denmark, located in Nyborg municipality on the island of Funen in Region of Southern Denmark.

== History ==
Hjulby has existed since the Late Iron Age, where archaeological findings suggest that Hjulby has been one of the largest settlements on Funen through the iron and Viking ages. Findings of numerous pithouses (Danish: Grubehuse) suggest that Hjulby was an important location on Funen between 600-1100 AD.

In 1904, a train station was built in Hjulby as part of the railroad between Nyborg, Odense and Middelfart - Dronning Louise's Railroad or The Funen Mainway (Danish: Den Fynske Hovedbane). The railroad had been running since 1865, but it wasn't until 1904 that a station was built in Hjulby. The station was shut down in 1977, along with the stations in Marslev, Ullerslev and Langeskov. Following that, the station building in Hjulby was torn down.

== Hjulby Church ==
Hjulby Church was built in 1882 by Vilhelm Tvede. Another church was previously located in Hjulby, but it was torn down in 1555. The church's baptismal font is from 1876.
