= Tårup =

- Village
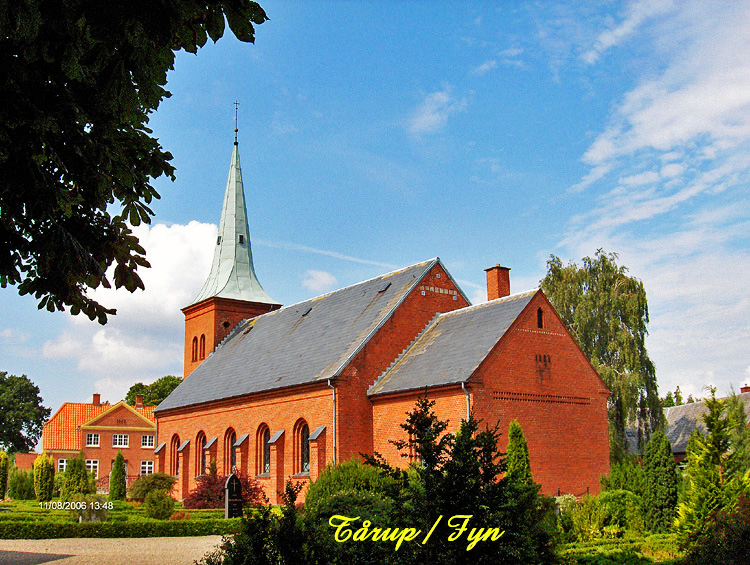
- Tårup Church

- Location within Region of Southern Denmark
- Coordinates: 55°14′07″N 10°46′22″E
- Country: Denmark
- Region: Southern Denmark
- Municipality: Nyborg

Population (2026)
  - Total: 284

Tårup is a village in central Denmark, located in Nyborg municipality on the island of Funen in Region of Southern Denmark.

== History ==
Tårup was first mentioned in 1361 as Thorpe. The name comes from the Danish word 'torp', translating to a settlement with a population from another village - in this case Frørup. Through the Middle Ages most of Tårup was owned by the crown.

== Tårup Church ==
Tårup Church is located in Tårup, and was built in 1883 by Jens Eckersberg. The church's current organ is from 2001. A model ship was bought during the church's 100-year anniversary in 1983. The ship is a model of a ship that sailed in the Great Belt Strait when the church was built in 1883. The two bells in the church are from the Netherlands and were built in 1972.
