= Ellinge =

- Village
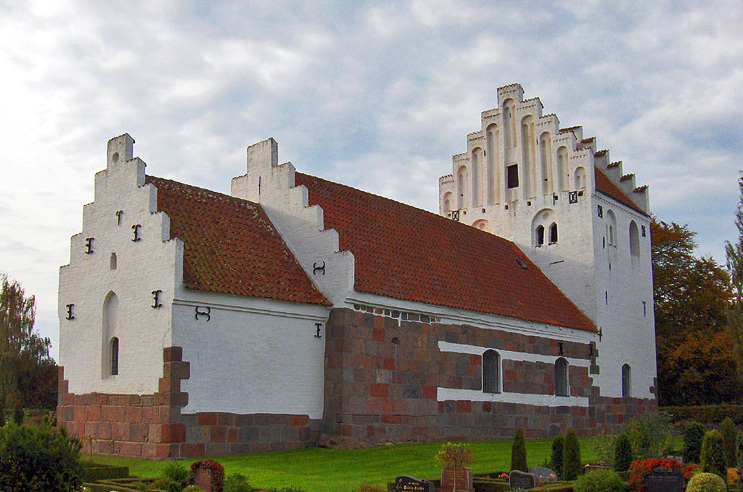
- Ellinge Church

- Location in the Region of Southern Denmark
- Coordinates: 55°18′51″N 10°37′19″E
- Country: Denmark
- Region: Southern Denmark
- Municipality: Nyborg

Population (2026)
  - Total: 218
- Time zone: UTC+1 (CET)
  - Summer (DST): UTC+2 (CEST)
- Website: Ellinge.dk

Ellinge is a village in central Denmark, located in Nyborg Municipality on the island of Funen. Ellinge is located 3 km east of Ferritslev, 12 km west of Nyborg and 19 km southeast of Odense. The village is located in Nyborg Municipality and the Region of Southern Denmark.

== History ==
Ellinge Church was built around year 1150-1200.
