= Ullerslev =

- Town
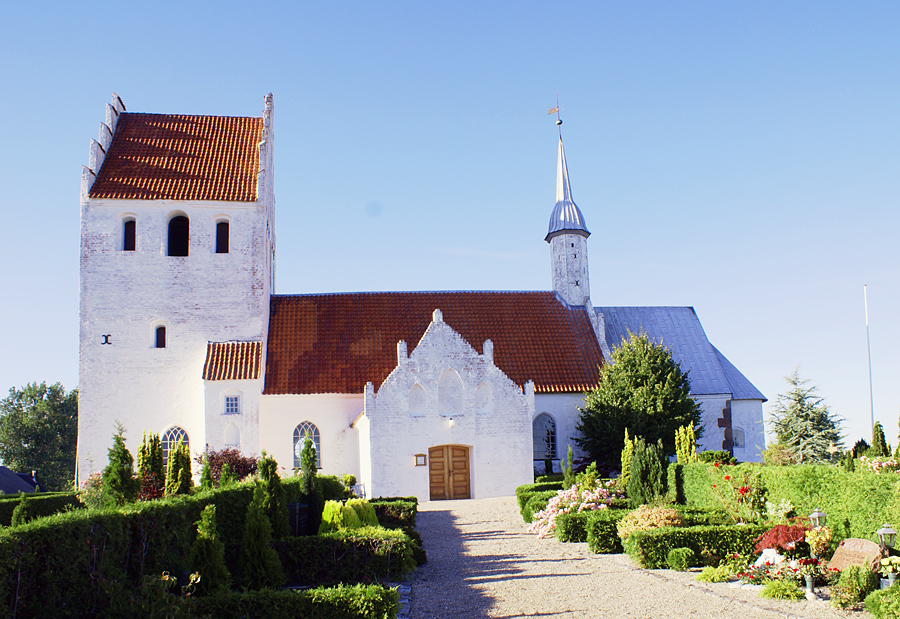
- Ullerslev Church

- Location within Region of Southern Denmark
- Coordinates: 55°21′48″N 10°40′0″E
- Country: Denmark
- Region: Southern Denmark
- Municipality: Nyborg

Area
  - Urban: 2.2 km^{2} (0.85 sq mi)

Population (2026)
  - Urban: 2,735
  - Urban density: 1,200/km^{2} (3,200/sq mi)
- Postal code: 5540
- Website: Ullerslev.dk

Ullerslev is a town in central Denmark, located in Nyborg municipality on the island of Funen in the Region of Southern Denmark. Ullerslev was until 2007 the seat of Ullerslev Municipality. The Vibeskolen school is located in the town. Ullerslev has a football team named Skellerup-Ullerslev Boldklub (SUB).

== History ==
Ullerslev was first mentioned in 1320 as 'Ulwersleff'.

Ullerslev Church (Danish: Ullerslev Kirke) was built around year 1150, and expanded later around year 1200. The crucifix is from 1520, and the church's two bells are from 1433 and 1906.

== Nature ==
Ullerslev has quiet a few different nature experiences. It is possible to visit a nature trail named ''Rundt om Mosen'', where you either can go on foot or on bike. For nature experiences it is possible to join one of the many communities, which Ullerslev holds. Some of the communities are listed below:

- Ullerslev Lystfiskerklub

- Ullerslevrideklub

== Notable residents ==
- Vilhelm Munk Nielsen (born 1955), football player
