= Måre =

- Village
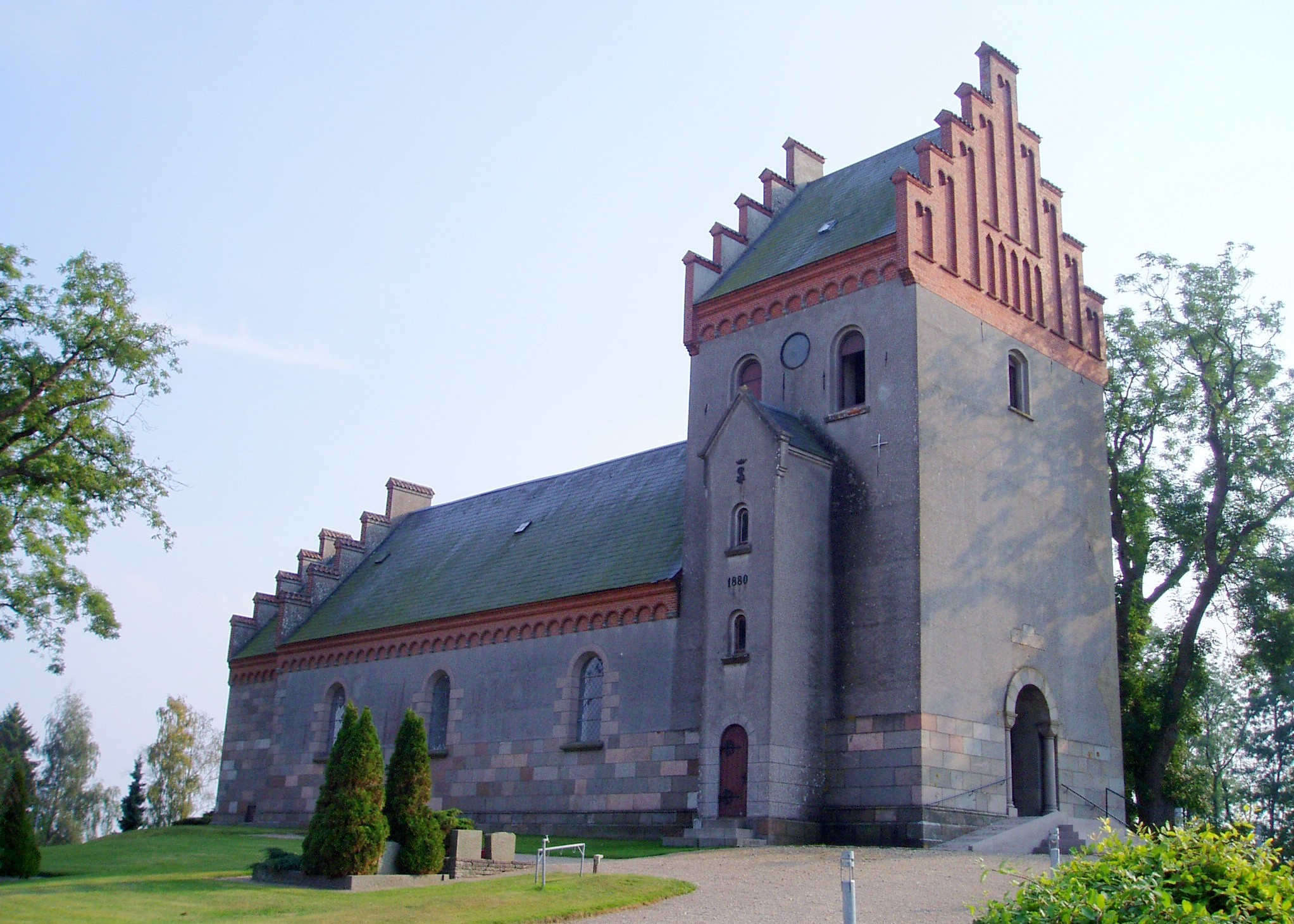
- Herrested Church

- Location within Region of Southern Denmark
- Coordinates: 55°16′40″N 10°36′45″E
- Country: Denmark
- Region: Southern Denmark
- Municipality: Nyborg

Population (2026)
  - Total: 530

Måre is a village in central Denmark, located in Nyborg municipality on the island of Funen in Region of Southern Denmark. Måre and the village of Herrested used to be separate villages, but have today grown together.

== History ==
Herrested has existed since at least 1258, where it was granted the status of a market town (Danish: Købstad) by Valdemar II. This lasted until 1415 where it became a birk.

Herrested Church was built around year 1100.
