= Refsvindinge =

- Village
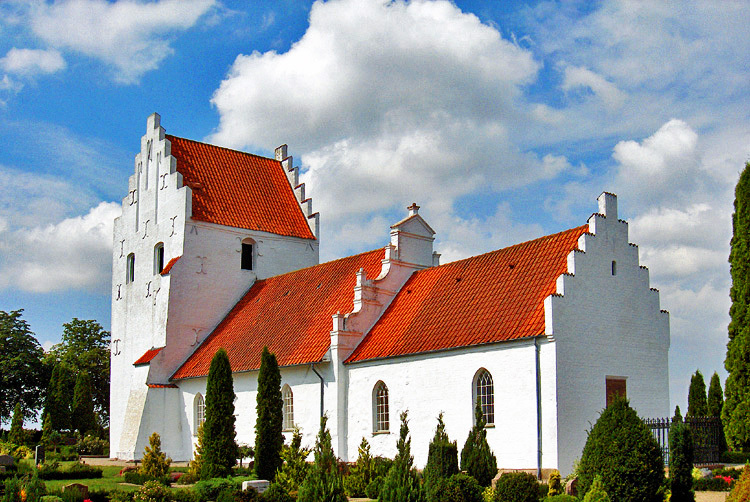
- Refsvindinge Church

- Location within Region of Southern Denmark
- Coordinates: 55°17′3″N 10°40′59″E
- Country: Denmark
- Region: Southern Denmark
- Municipality: Nyborg

Population (2026)
  - Total: 568

Refsvindinge is a village in central Denmark, located in Nyborg municipality on the island of Funen in Region of Southern Denmark.

== History ==
Refsvindinge Church was built between year 1150–1200.

Refsvindinge was first mentioned in 1435 but founded earlier. A hospital was built in the town in 1716 by the owner of the Juulskov Manor. A shared school between Refsvindinge and Kullerup was built in 1741, also by the owner of Juulskov Manor. A school for just Refsvindinge was later built, in 1759 and another in 1833. The Juulskov School (Danish: Juulskovskolen) was founded in 1965, to be shared between Refsvindinge and Kullerup. It was shut down in 2009.

A brewery was founded in 1885 by H.P. Rasmussen (1858-1951). It still exists today, and is run by the 4th generation of the Rasmussen family.

With the construction of the Faaborg-Ringe-Nyborg railroad, Refsvindinge was a station between Nyborg and Ringe. Refsvindige's history as a railroad station town lasted between 1897–1962. After 1962 the railway no longer transported passengers, and the station was shut down. The station building in Refsvindinge was preserved.
