= Mette Magrete Tvistman =

Mette Magrete Tvistman (1741, Frørup – 9 February 1827, Snejbjerg, Herning) was a Danish artist (clockmaker). She is known in Danish history as the first female clockmaker in her country.

== Biography ==
Mette Magrete Tvistman was the daughter of the blacksmith and clockmaker Christen Jensen (1703–1781) and Maren Nielsdatter (1700–1791). She married the clockmaker Johan Ahlert Tvistman (1721–1769) in 1760, and had two children. In 1771, she married the farmer Christen Jensen, and had a daughter, but quickly divorced him. She was engaged to a son of the influential cleric Ude Haahr of Holstebro in 1788, but broke the engagement, which was regarded a scandal.

After the death of her first spouse, she became active as a clockmaker with a workshop in the farm she inherited from her spouse. In 1783, she left her workshop to her son. From 1783 to 1787, she was active as a clockmaker with her own workshop in Vejle, in 1787–98 in Ølgod, and in 1798–1818 in Holstebro. During her stay at Holstebro, however, she seem to have been active more as the manager of the community poorhouse, which was housed at her farm, though she was officially listed as a clockmaker. In 1818, she retired to the home of her daughter. She died in poverty.

== Legacy ==
Tvistman is referred to as the first female clockmaker in Denmark. Her most productive period was that in Ølgod, when she owned one of the largest estates in the city, which she had made her workshop. At least 35 of her constructed clocks are preserved, notably a grandmother clock.
