= Daloon =

Daloon (Chinese: The big dragon) is a Danish food producer, founded in 1960 by Chinese Sai-chiu Van in Charlottenlund under the name Vans products (Danish:Vans produkter). Daloons most famous products is spring roll.

In 1970 the company moved to Nyborg. Administrative director was Hemming Van, son of the founder.

At the end of 2015 it was announced that the privately held company was sold to the Dutch frozen snack food producer Izico, which is owned by the Dutch investment fund Egeria.
