= Svindinge =

- Village
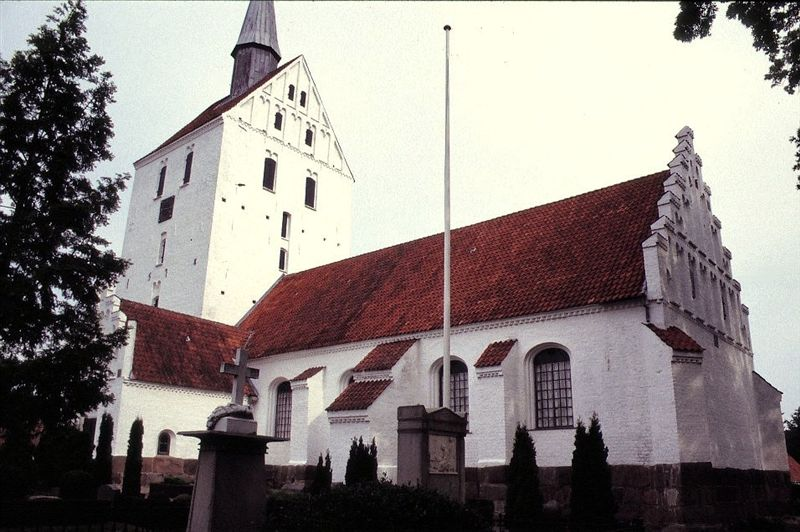
- Svindinge Church

- Location within Region of Southern Denmark
- Coordinates: 55°13′02″N 10°41′16″E
- Country: Denmark
- Region: Southern Denmark
- Municipality: Nyborg

Population (2026)
  - Total: 279

Svindinge is a village in central Denmark, located in Nyborg municipality on the island of Funen in Region of Southern Denmark.

== History ==
Svindinge is first mentioned in 1376 as Swinninge, but likely originates from the Iron Age.

== Svindinge Church ==
Svindinge Church was built in the period 1571–78. The construction was ordered by Christoffer Valckendorf, the owner of Glorup manor at the time. A local story tells of a jötunn from Langeland, who was upset with Svindinge Church's tall steeple and threw a giant rock at the church. She failed to hit, and instead the stone landed near Hesselager, where it is located today. The church has three bells. The largest is known as "Saint Peter's Rooster" (Danish: Skt. Peders Hane) and is from 1572. The two smaller bells are from 1724. The altarpiece is by Siegwald Dahl. The church's organ is from the 1960s.
