= Vilhelm Munk Nielsen =

Danish former professional footballer

Personal information
- Date of birth: 30 December 1955 (age 70)
- Place of birth: Ullerslev, Denmark
- Position: Forward

Senior career*
Years	Team	Apps	(Gls)
1976–1985	OB	239	(102)
1986–1992	OKS		

International career
1981–1983	Denmark	5	(0)
- * Club domestic league appearances and goals

Vilhelm Munk Nielsen (born 30 December 1955) is a Danish former footballer who played as a forward for OB. He played five games for the Denmark national football team.

== Club career ==
A key player for OB during almost a decade, Munk Nielsen stands third on the all-time top goalscorer list for the club with 102 goals in 239 appearances. After his career in OB, he played several years for Odense Kammeraternes Sportsklub (OKS) before retiring.

== International career ==
Munk Nielsen gained his first international cap for Denmark on 12 August 1981 in a 2–1 win over Finland. He made a total of five appearances for the national team.
