= Frørup =

- Village
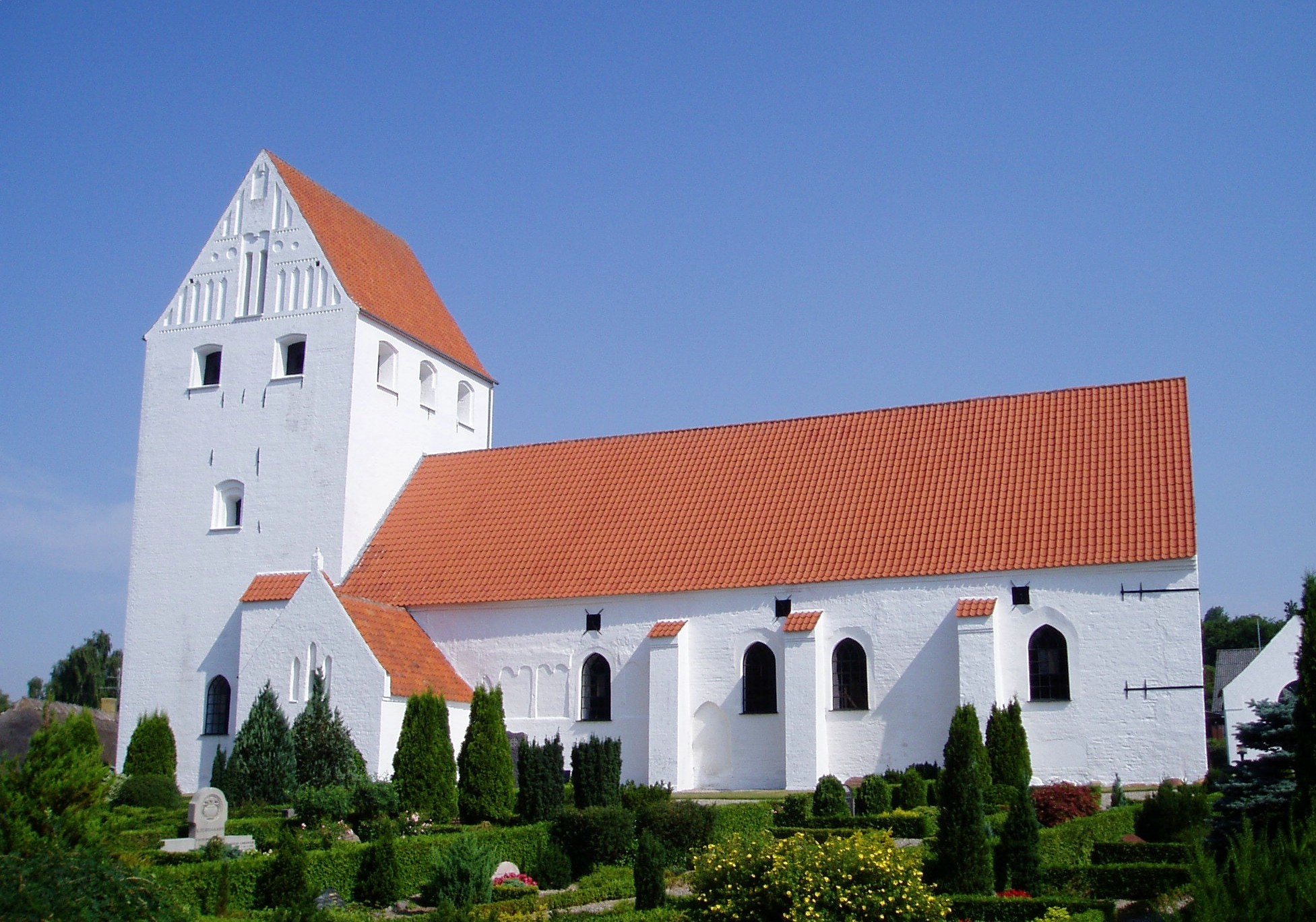
- Frørup Church

- Location in the Region of Southern Denmark
- Coordinates: 55°14′33″N 10°42′57″E
- Country: Denmark
- Region: Southern Denmark
- Municipality: Nyborg

Population (2026)
  - Total: 376
- Time zone: UTC+1 (CET)
  - Summer (DST): UTC+2 (CEST)
- Postal code: 5871

Frørup is a village in southern Denmark, located in Nyborg Municipality on the island of Funen in the Region of Southern Denmark. Frørup was a part of Ørbæk Municipality until 2007.

== History ==
Frørup is first mentioned in 1231 under the name Frøthorp.

Between 1897 and 1964, Frørup was a station on the Svendborg-Nyborg railroad. The station in Frørup was designed by Heinrich Wenck.

== Frørup Church ==
Frørup Church was built around 1140. On the cemetery is a tombstone from the 1200s, belonging to an ironsmith named Mads Pebling. The pegs inside the church are from 1612, and were donated to the church by owner of Holckenhavn, Jacob Ulfeldt, after a fire in Frørup and Frørup Church. A model ship, of the 1780-built ship Christianshavn, was hung in the church in 1997.

== Regisse Well ==
The Regisse Well (Danish: Regissekilden) is a holy well, said to have healing properties. The well has been a place of religious significance even before the time of Christianity. The well was said to have magical properties on Saint John's Eve, resulting in pilgrimages to the well on that day. A yearly market was held around that time, and the yearly visits continued up until around 1880. The well was restored in 1903.

== Notable residents ==
- Mette Magrete Tvistman (1741 – 1827), artist and clockmaker
