= Skellerup, Denmark =

Skellerup
- Village
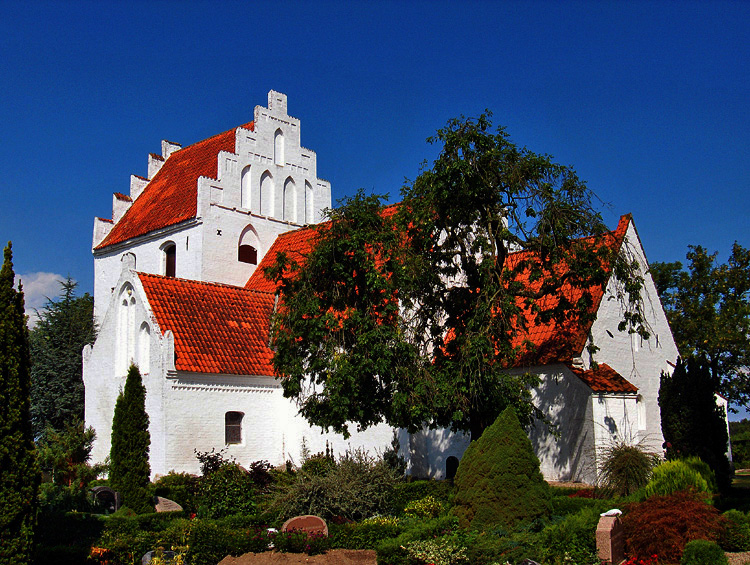
- Skellerup Church

- Location within Region of Southern Denmark
- Coordinates: 55°20′11″N 10°39′30″E
- Country: Denmark
- Region: Southern Denmark
- Municipality: Nyborg

Population (2026)
  - Total: 343

Skellerup is a village in central Denmark, located in Nyborg municipality on the island of Funen in the Region of Southern Denmark.

== History ==
Skellerup is first mentioned in 1414 as Skeldorp. The church was built between year 1150–1200.

Biskopstorp is a small manor house (Danish: Hovedgård) located south of Skellerup. It was founded in 1765.
