= Kenneth Muhs =

Danish politician and mayor

Mayor of Nyborg Municipality
- Incumbent
- Assumed office 1 January 2014
- Preceded by: Erik Skov Christensen (A)

Personal details
- Born: 14 December 1972 (age 53) Ørbæk, Denmark
- Party: Venstre

Kenneth Muhs (born 14 December 1972) is a Danish politician. He is a member of the party Venstre, and is the current mayor in Nyborg Municipality. Muhs is a major in the Danish Defence.

== Political career ==
Muhs was first elected into political office at the 2001 Danish local elections, where he was elected as municipal councillor of Ørbæk Municipality. He remained a member of the municipal council until it was dissolved and merged with Nyborg and Ullerslev Municipality. He has been a member of Nyborg Municipality's municipal council since 2014, elected at the 2013 Danish local elections. In the 2017 and 2021 elections him and his party gained absolute majority in the municipal council, securing Muhs the position of mayor.
