= Erik Skov Christensen =

Danish politician

Member of the Folketing
- In office 18 June 2015 – 5 June 2019
- Constituency: Fyn

Mayor of Nyborg Municipality
- In office 1 January 2010 – 31 December 2013
- Preceded by: Jørn Terndrup (V)
- Succeeded by: Kenneth Muhs (V)

Mayor of Ullerslev Municipality
- In office 1998–2007
- Preceded by: Tage Jensen (A)
- Succeeded by: None

Personal details
- Born: 25 February 1958 (age 68) Nyborg, Denmark
- Party: Social Democrats

Erik Skov Christensen (born 25 February 1958 in Nyborg) is a Danish politician, who was a member of the Folketing for the Social Democrats from 2015 to 2019. He was the mayor of Ullerslev Municipality from 1998 to 2007 and of Nyborg Municipality from 2010 to 2013.

== Political career ==
Christensen sat in the municipal council of Ullerslev Municipality from 1994 until it was merged with Nyborg and Ørbæk Municipality in 2007 to form a new Nyborg Municipality. He sat in the municipal council of the new Nyborg Municipality from 2006 to 2015. From 1998 to 2007 he was the mayor of Ullerslev Municipality and from 2010 to 2013 he was the mayor of Nyborg Municipality.

Christensen was elected into parliament at the 2015 Danish general election, where he received 4,447 votes. In the 2019 election he received 3,441 votes and did not get reelected. In 2020 Christensen became the head of a Danish commission to spread awareness of the work of the European Union.
