= Jørn Terndrup =

Danish politician

Mayor of Nyborg Municipality
- In office 2007–2009
- Preceded by: None
- Succeeded by: Erik Skov Christensen (A)

Mayor of Nyborg Municipality
- In office 2002–2007
- Preceded by: Niels V. Andersen (A)
- Succeeded by: None

Personal details
- Born: 3 December 1947 (age 78) Nyborg, Denmark
- Party: Venstre

Jørn Terndrup (born 3 December 1947) is a Danish politician. He is a member of the party Venstre, and was the first mayor of the Nyborg Municipality, created during the 2007 municipal reform, by merging Nyborg Municipality, Ullerslev Municipality and Ørbæk Municipality.
