= Vindinge =

Vindinge may refer to:

- Vindinge, Nyborg Municipality, a village in Southern Denmark
- Vindinge, Roskilde Municipality, a village in Zealand, Denmark
