= Nyborg Municipality (1970–2006) =

Nyborg Municipality Nyborg Kommune
- Former municipality
- Coat of arms

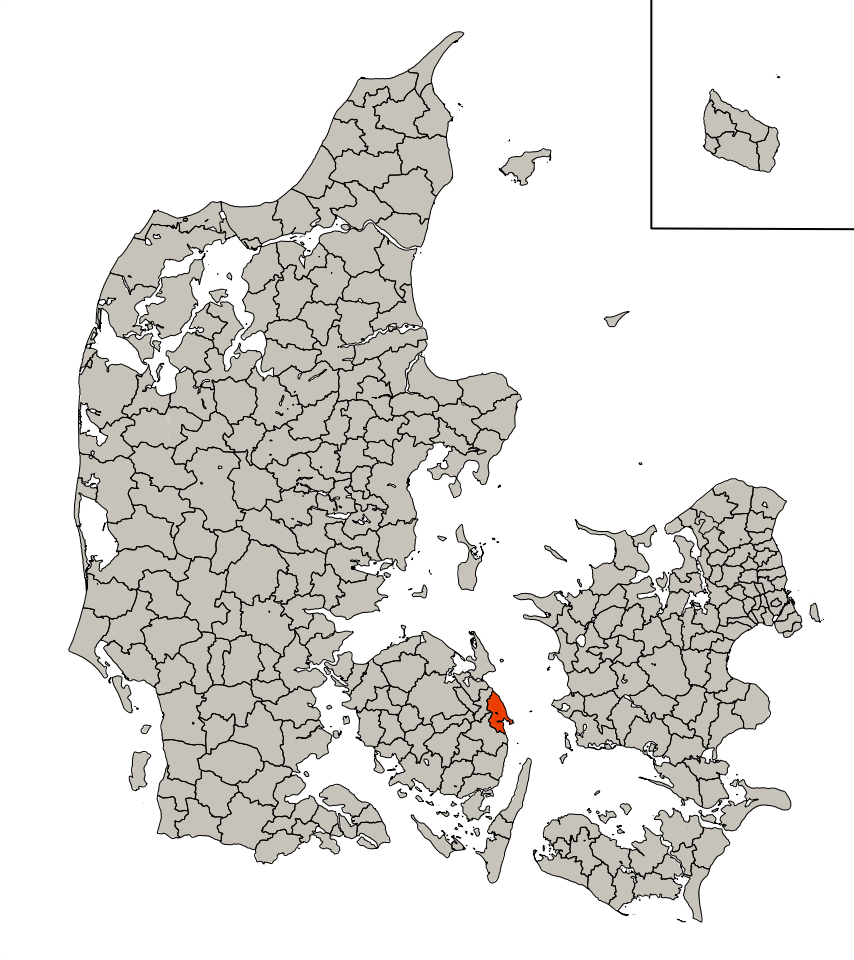
- Country: Denmark
- County: Funen
- Established: April 1, 1970
- Dissolved: December 31, 2006
- Seat: Nyborg

Government
  - Last mayor: Jørn Terndrup (V)

Area
  - Total: 83.57 km^{2} (32.27 sq mi)

Population (2006)
  - Total: 19,134
  - Density: 229.0/km^{2} (593.0/sq mi)
- Time zone: UTC1 (CET)
  - Summer (DST): UTC2 (CEST)
- Municipal code: 449

Until January 1, 2007 Nyborg Municipality was a municipality (Danish: kommune) in the former Funen County, on the east coast of the island of Funen, in central Denmark. The municipality covered an area of 83.57 km^{2}, and had a total population of 19,134 (2006). Its last mayor was Jørn Terndrup, who was a member of the Venstre party.

Nyborg Municipality bordered Ullerslev Municipality to the north and northwest, and Ørbæk Municipality to the south and southwest. After the construction of the Great Belt Bridge in 1998, the municipality also connected to Korsør Municipality. Until then Korsør and Nyborg had been connected through ferries.

The municipality ceased to exist as the result of Kommunalreformen 2007 (the Municipality Reform of 2007). It was merged with Ørbæk and Ullerslev municipalities to form a new Nyborg municipality. The new municipality belongs to Region of Southern Denmark.

== History ==
Nyborg Castle was built in 1170, and the city built up around the castle around that time. Nyborg Municipality as an administrative region has existed since the rule of Valdemar II of Denmark, who granted Nyborg the rights of a market town (Danish: Købstad). A royal charter from 1193 indicates that the city has been granted the status of a market town even earlier. Nyborg Castle became the seat of the Danish Court (Danish: Danehof), giving the town numerous unique privileges. Among those privileges were the fact that the merchants of Vindinge Hundred had to go to Nyborg to sell their wares. In 1410, the market town of Nyborg was given the same privileges as that of Odense, an even older market town. The privileges were expanded in 1446, where the merchants of Gudme Hundred also had to go to Nyborg with their wares. Harbours between Kerteminde, Svendborg and Slipshavn were also outlawed, and Nyborg was given permission to arrange a large yearly market. The year after the privileges of 1446, artisans from Vindinge Hundred were told to move to the market towns, expanding the importance of the market town of Nyborg. With the king visiting regularly, due to Nyborg's central location and the castle being the seat of the Danehof, Nyborg was given many additional privileges over the years.

In 1662, Denmark's administrative divisions were changed. Fiefs (Danish: Len) were dissolved and the country split into several amts. Nyborg County was created, and besides the market town of Nyborg, it included the hundreds of Vindinge Hundred, Sunds Hundred, Gudme Hundred, Sallinge Hundred and the eastern part of Bjerge Hundred. It also included ten birks: Hindsholm, Holckenhavn, Ravnholt, Glorup, Hesselager, Brahetrolleborg, Holstenshuus, Vantinge, Avernakø and Strynø. In 1793, Nyborg County was dissolved and merged with Tranekær County to become a part of Svendborg County, with its seat in Svendborg. This changed again in the 1970 Danish Municipal Reform, where Svendborg Country and Odense County were merged to form Funen County.

The hundreds, market towns and birks were dissolved in the municipal reform of 1970 and split Denmark into 277 municipalities. Nyborg Municipality was formed of the market town of Nyborg, and its parishes, as well as the two parish municipalities of Avnslev-Bovense and Vindinge.

In the Municipality Reform of 2007 Nyborg Municipality was merged with Ørbæk and Ullerslev Municipality to form a new Nyborg Municipality.

It was in 2005 suggested that Nyborg should not only be merged with Ørbæk and Ullerslev, but also with the municipalities of Munkebo, Langeskov and Kerteminde to create one large Eastern Funen municipality. The reason was that the new Kerteminde Municipality would have too small of a population to function properly. In the end, Nyborg and Kerteminde weren't merged and became two separate municipalities.

=== Historical divisions ===
Historical municipal divisions of Nyborg Municipality
2007	1970	1875	1842	1200	Towns
Nyborg Mun.	Nyborg Mun.	Nyborg Market Town Mun.	Nyborg Market Town		Nyborg
Nyborg Mun.	Nyborg Mun.	Nyborg Rural Parish			Hjulby
Nyborg Mun.	Nyborg Mun.	Aunslev-Bovense Parish Mun.			Aunslev
Nyborg Mun.	Nyborg Mun.	Vindinge Parish Mun.			Vindinge
Nyborg Mun.	Ullerslev Mun.				
Nyborg Mun.	Ørbæk Mun.				

== Towns ==
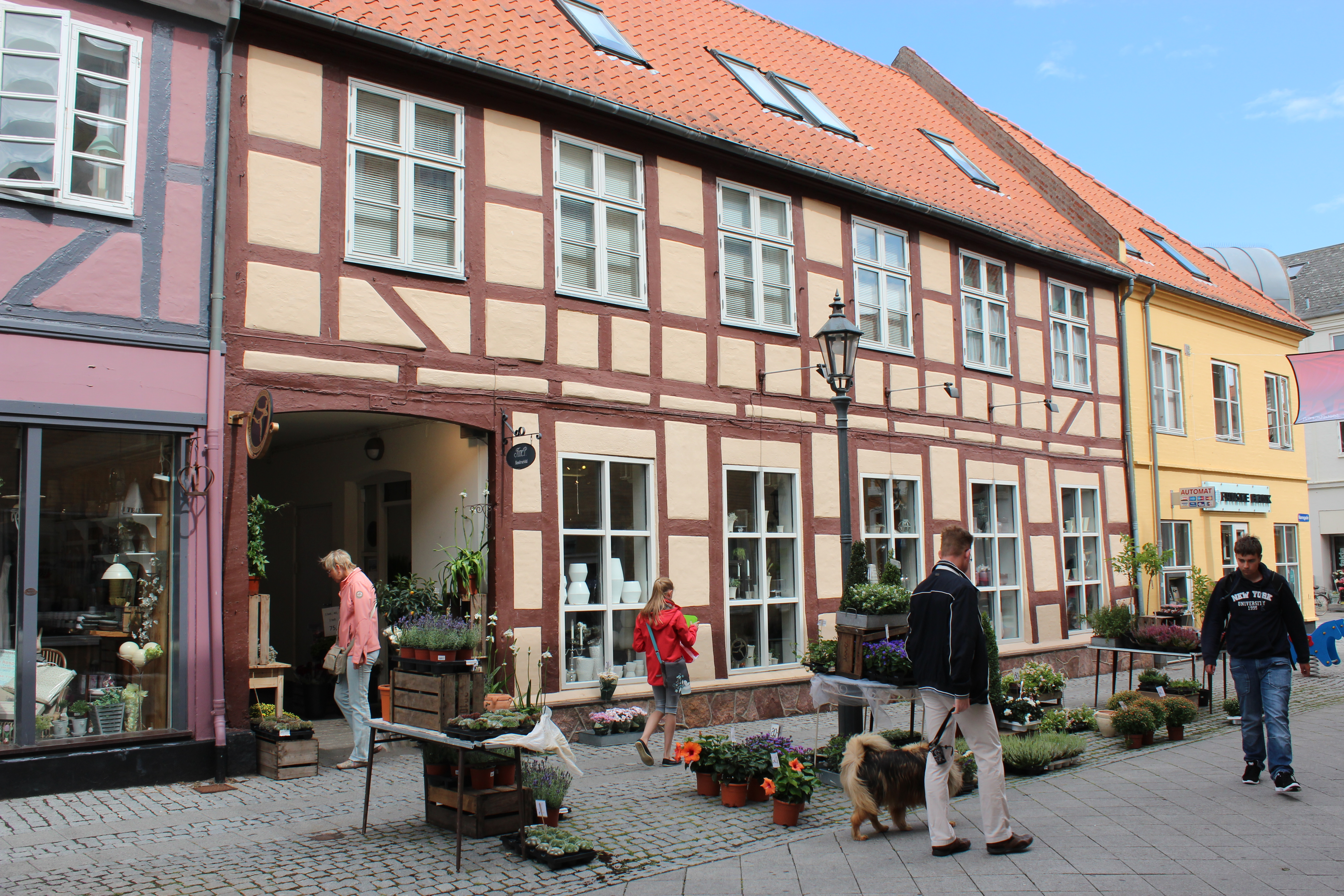
Street in Nyborg

The municipality was centered around Nyborg, which was by far the largest settlement in the municipality. More than 80% of the municipality's population lived in the city of Nyborg. Half of the remaining fifth of the population lived in rural areas with the rest living in the smaller towns and villages of Aunslev, Hjulby and Vindinge. Smaller villages in the municipality included Frydenlund, Bovense, Nordenhuse, Skaboeshuse, Regstrup, Skalkendrup, Korkendrup, Sulkendrup and Kogsbølle.

Nyborg was located in the eastern part of the municipality. The municipality's town hall was located here, and is still in use by the new Nyborg Municipality. The town hall originate from 1586, though most of the building is newer. Much of it originate from 1803, where the town hall was being rebuilt after a fire. Another floor and other modifications were added in 1862. The building went through additional modifications in 1899, 1931-36 and the 1970s.

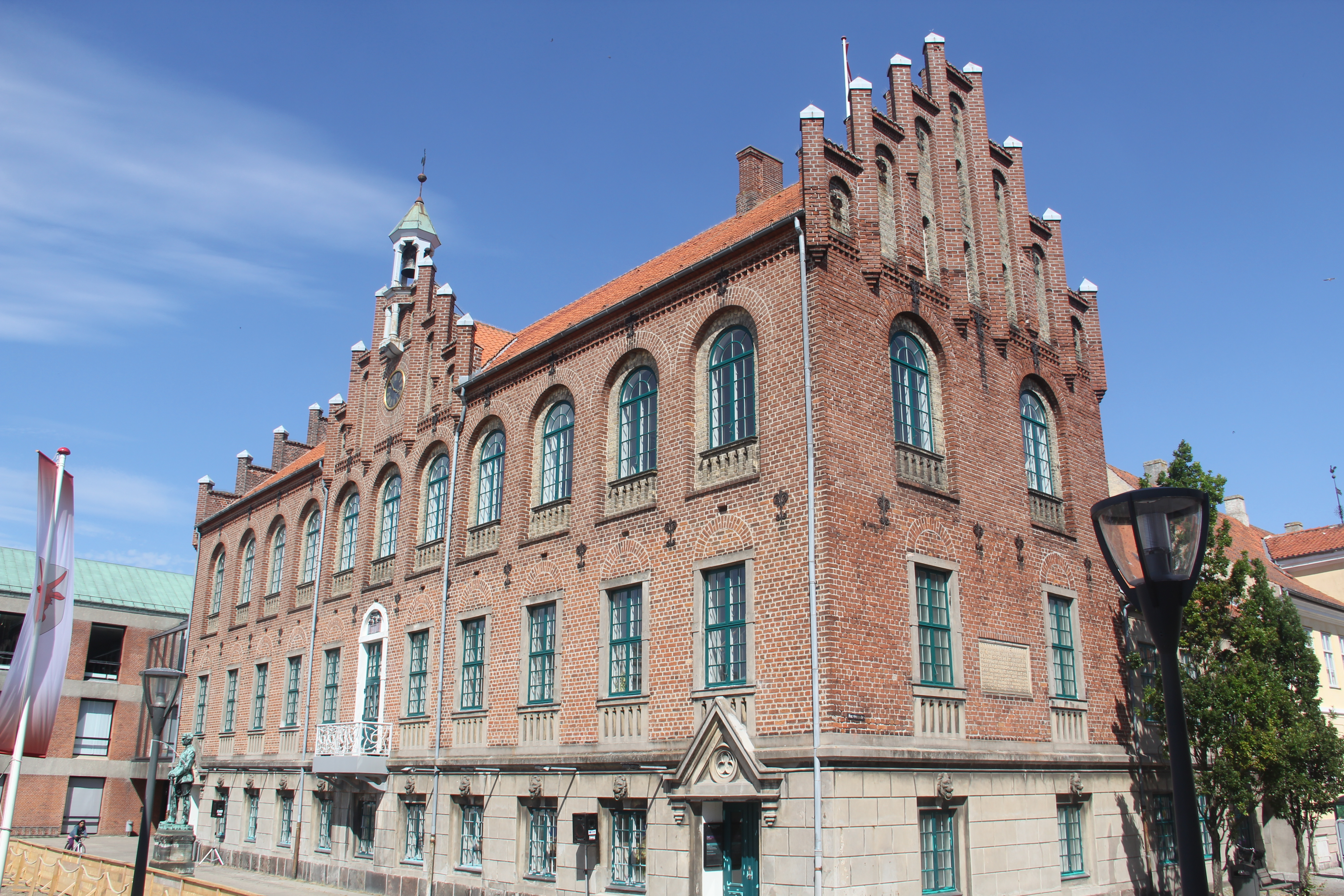
Nyborg town hall

Below are the populations from 2006 of the four larger settlements of the municipality.

Nyborg	16,043
Hjulby	444
Vindinge	426
Aunslev	423

== Politics ==
=== Municipal council ===
Below are the municipal council elected since the municipality's creation in 1970 and until 2001, which was the last election before the municipality was dissolved.

Election	Party							Total seats	Elected mayor
Election	A	C	F	O	V	Z	...	Total seats	Elected mayor
1970	10	3			2			15	Børge Jensen (A)
1974	10	2	1		2			15	Børge Jensen (A)
1978	8	2	2		2	1		15	Frederik Nørgaard (A)
1981	8	3	2		2			15	Aage K. Kock (A)
1985	6	3	3		2		1	15	Aage K. Kock (A)
1989	8	2	2		3		2	17	Niels V. Andersen (A)
1993	8	2	1		4		2	17	Niels V. Andersen (A)
1997	8	2	1	1	3		2	17	Niels V. Andersen (A)
2001	5	2	1	1	6		2	17	Jørn Terndrup (V)
Data from Statistikbanken.dk and editions of Kommunal Aarbog

=== Mayors ===
Since the creation of the municipality in 1970 and until it was dissolved in 2007, the mayors of Nyborg Municipality were:

#	Mayor	Party	Term
1	Børge Jensen	Social Democrats	1970-1978
2	Frederik Nørgaard	Social Democrats	1978-1982
3	Aage K. Kock	Social Democrats	1982-1990
4	Niels V. Andersen	Social Democrats	1990-2002
5	Jørn Terndrup	Venstre	2002-2007

== Parishes ==
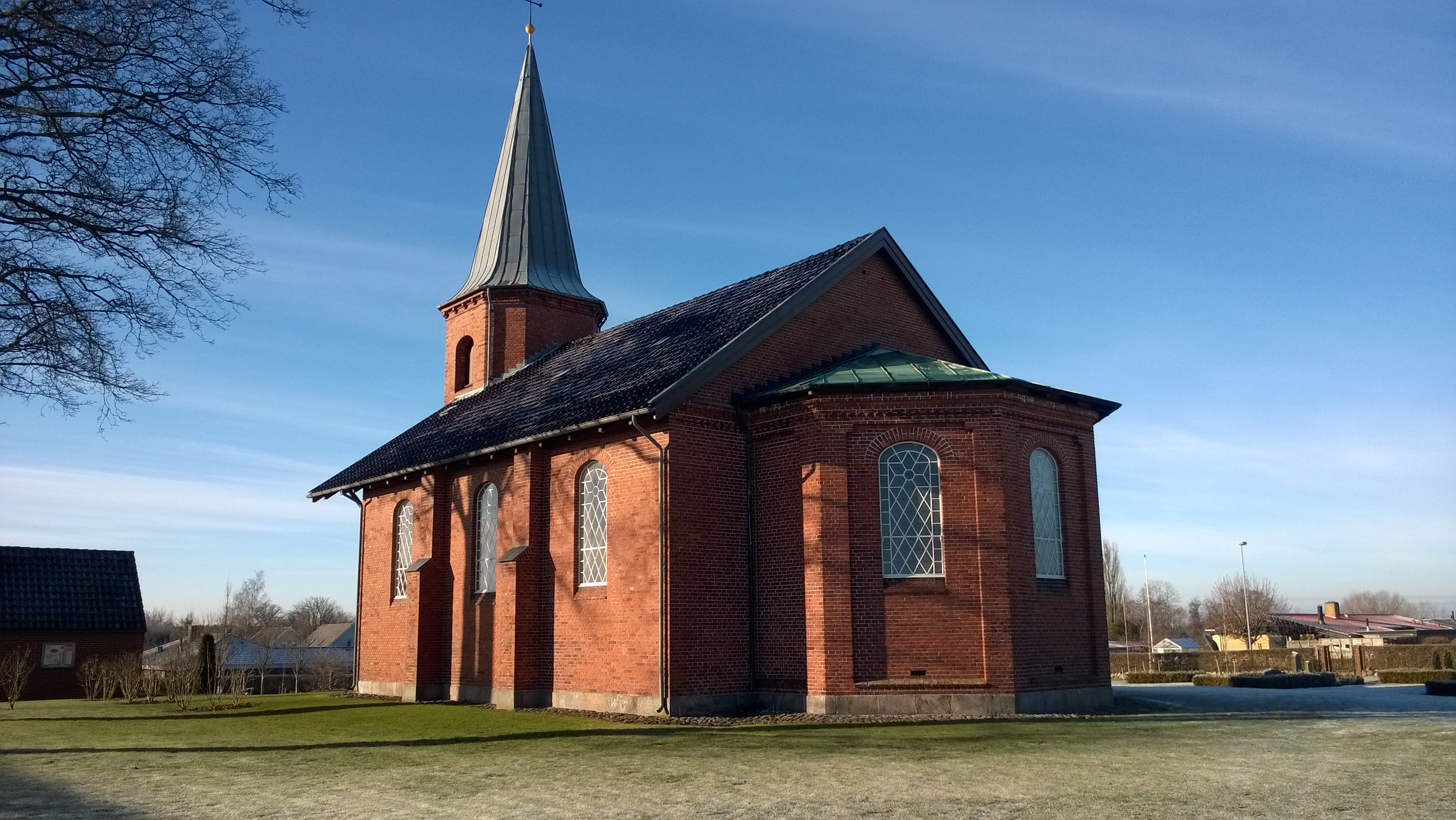
Hjulby Church

The municipality consisted of four parishes and six churches.

- Aunslev Parish (Aunslev Church)
- Bovense Parish (Bovense Church)
- Nyborg Parish (Hjulby Church, Nyborg Church, Steengårds Church)
- Vindinge Parish (Vindinge Church)

== Symbols ==
The coat of arms of Nyborg Municipality originates from the 14th century. The star and moon's origins are unknown, though believed to originate from Nyborg Church, which is dedicated to Virgin Mary. They are also symbols of eternity. The castle represents Nyborg Castle. The head began appearing in the 15th century and its origins are unknown.
