= Ullerslev Municipality =

Coordinates: 55°21′N 10°40′E

Ullerslev Municipality Ullerslev Kommune
- Former municipality
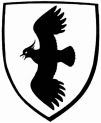
- Coat of arms

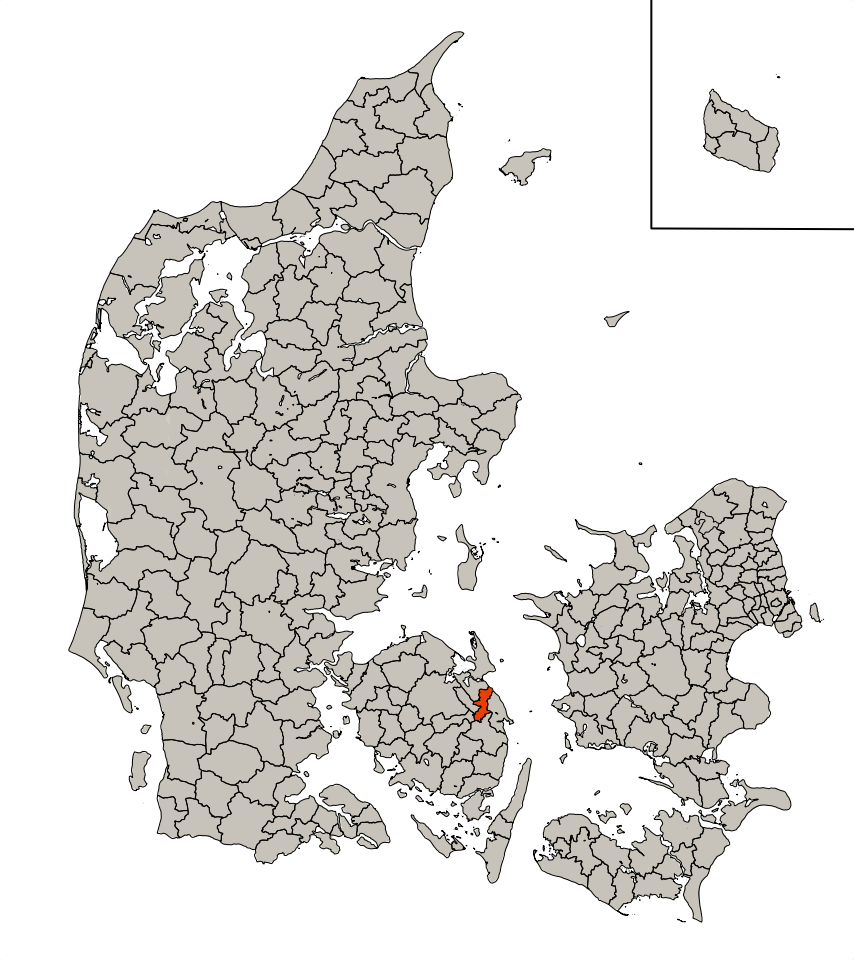
- Country: Denmark
- County: Funen
- Established: 1 April 1970
- Dissolved: 31 December 2006
- Seat: Ullerslev

Government
  - Last mayor: Erik Skov Christensen (A)

Area
  - Total: 54 km^{2} (21 sq mi)

Population (2006)
  - Total: 5,190
  - Density: 96/km^{2} (250/sq mi)
- Time zone: UTC1 (CET)
  - Summer (DST): UTC2 (CEST)
- Municipal code: 489

Until 1 January 2007 Ullerslev Municipality was a municipality (Danish: kommune) in the former Funen County, on the east coast of the island of Funen, in central Denmark. The municipality covered an area of 54 km^{2}, and had a total population of 5,190 (2006). Its last mayor was Erik Christensen, a member of the Social Democrats.

Ullerslev Municipality bordered Munkebo Municipality to the north, Langeskov and Årslev Municipality to the west, Ørbæk Municipality to the south and Nyborg Municipality to the east.

The municipality ceased to exist as the result of Kommunalreformen 2007 (the Municipality Reform of 2007). It was merged with Nyborg and Ørbæk municipalities to form a new Nyborg municipality. The new municipality belongs to Region of Southern Denmark.

== History ==
In the Middle Ages, when Denmark was divided into hundreds, the area of Ullerslev Municipality was under Vindinge Hundred. In 1662 counties were established, and Ullerslev came under Nyborg County. It merged with Tranekær County in 1793 to form Svendborg County. In the 1970 Danish Municipal Reform Svendborg County was merged with Odense County to form Funen County. After the 2007 municipal reform Funen County came under the Region of Southern Denmark.

From 1842, where parish municipalities were created, and until 1937 the area of Ullerslev Municipality consisted of just two parish municipalities. The Flødstrup-Ullerslev Parish Municipality was split in two in 1937, with Flødstrup and Ullerslev becoming independent parish municipalities. Ullerslev merged with Skellerup-Ellinge Parish Municipality in 1964 however. In 1970 the two parish municipalities of Ullerslev and Flødstrup merged to form Ullerslev Municipality.

In the Municipality Reform of 2007 Ullerslev Municipality was merged with Nyborg and Ørbæk Municipality to form a new Nyborg Municipality.

It was in 2005 suggested that Ullerslev should not only be merged with Nyborg and Ørbæk, but also with the municipalities of Munkebo, Langeskov and Kerteminde to create one large Eastern Funen municipality. The reason was that the new Kerteminde Municipality would have too small of a population to function properly. In the end, Nyborg and Kerteminde weren't merged and became two separate municipalities.

=== Historical divisions ===
Historical municipal divisions of Ullerslev Municipality
2007	1970	1964	1947	1937	1842	Towns
Nyborg Mun.	Ullerslev Mun.	Ullerslev Parish Mun.	Skellerup-Ellinge Parish Mun.			Skellerup
Nyborg Mun.	Ullerslev Mun.	Ullerslev Parish Mun.	Skellerup-Ellinge Parish Mun.			Ellinge
Nyborg Mun.	Ullerslev Mun.	Ullerslev Parish Mun.	Ullerslev Parish Mun.		Flødstrup-Ullerslev Parish Mun.	Ullerslev
Nyborg Mun.	Ullerslev Mun.	Flødstrup Parish Mun.			Flødstrup-Ullerslev Parish Mun.	Flødstrup
Nyborg Mun.	Nyborg Mun.					
Nyborg Mun.	Ørbæk Mun.					

== Towns ==
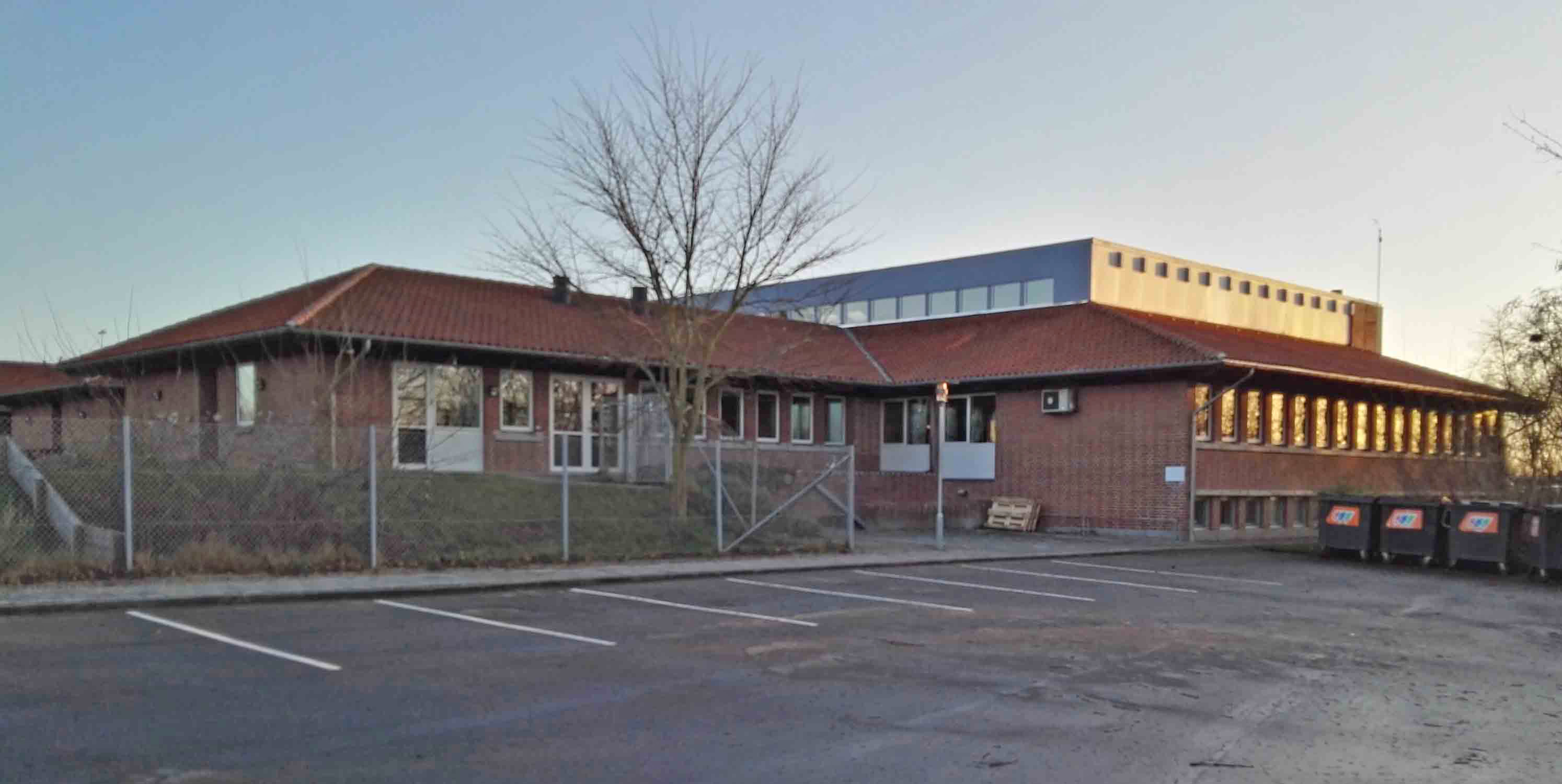
Former city hall in Ullerslev.

The largest settlement in the municipality was Ullerslev, where approximately half of the municipality's population lived. Approximately a third of the population lived in rural areas with the remainder living in Ellinge and Skellerup. Smaller villages in the municipality included Mullerup, Langtved, Kissendrup and Flødstrup.

Ullerslev was located centrally in Ullerslev Municipality, and was home to a train station until 1977. The former city hall of Ullerslev Municipality, located in Ullerslev, is today a daycare.

Below are the populations from 2006 of the three larger settlements of the municipality.

Ullerslev	2,722
Skellerup	372
Ellinge	229

== Politics ==
=== Municipal council ===
Below are the municipal council elected since the municipality's creation in 1970 and until 2001, which was the last election before the municipality was dissolved.

Election	Party							Total seats	Elected mayor
Election	A	B	C	F	V	Z	...	Total seats	Elected mayor
1970	5	1	1		5		1	13	Niels Peter Madsen (V)
1974	5	1			5		1	13	Niels Peter Madsen (V)
1978	5				5	2	1	13	Niels Peter Madsen (V)
1981	5				6	1		13	Niels Peter Madsen (V)
1985	4		2	1	6			13	Niels Peter Madsen (V)
1985	4		2	1	6			13	Niels Peter Madsen (V)
1989	6		1	1	5			13	Tage Jensen (A)
1993	7		1		5			13	Tage Jensen (A)
1997	6		1		5		1	13	Erik Skov Christensen (A)
2001	8				3		2	13	Erik Skov Christensen (A)
Data from Statistikbanken.dk and Ellinge.dk

=== Mayors ===
Since the creation of the municipality in 1970 and until it was dissolved in 2007, the mayors of Ullerslev Municipality were:

#	Mayor	Party	Term
1	Niels Peter Madsen	Venstre	1970-1990
2	Tage Jensen	Social Democrats	1990-1998
3	Erik Skov Christensen	Social Democrats	1998-2007

== Parishes ==
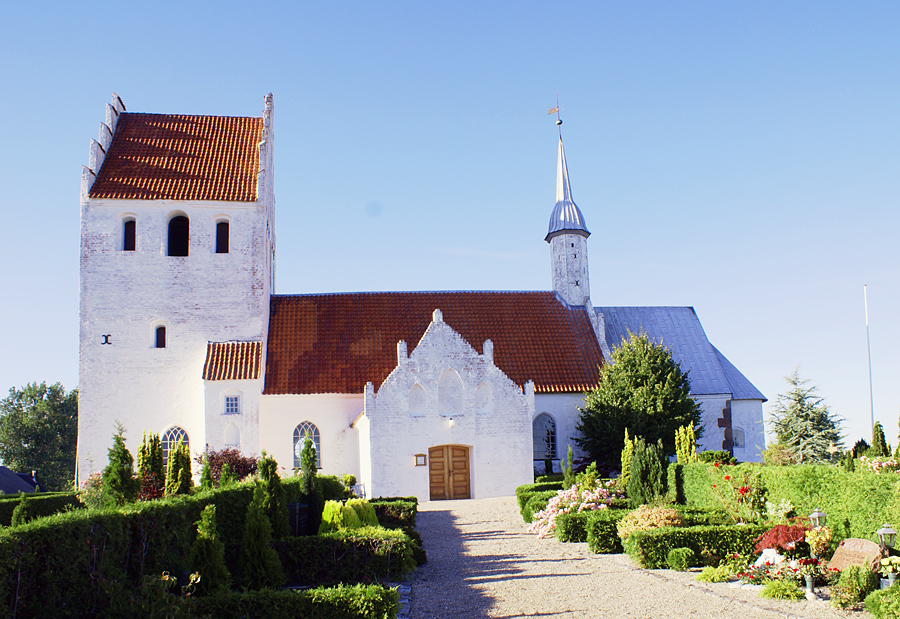
Ullerslev Church

The municipality consisted of four parishes and four churches.

- Ellinge Parish (Ellinge Church)
- Flødstrup Parish (Flødstrup Church)
- Skellerup Parish (Skellerup Church)
- Ullerslev Parish (Ullerslev Church)

== Symbols ==
The coat of arms of Ullerslev Municipality was a white lapwing on blue background. A variant of the coat of arms existed in black and white - black lapwing and white background.

Blue and white version

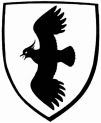
Black and white version
