= Ørbæk Municipality =

Coordinates: 55°15′26″N 10°40′13″E

Ørbæk Municipality Ørbæk Kommune
- Former municipality
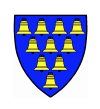
- Coat of arms

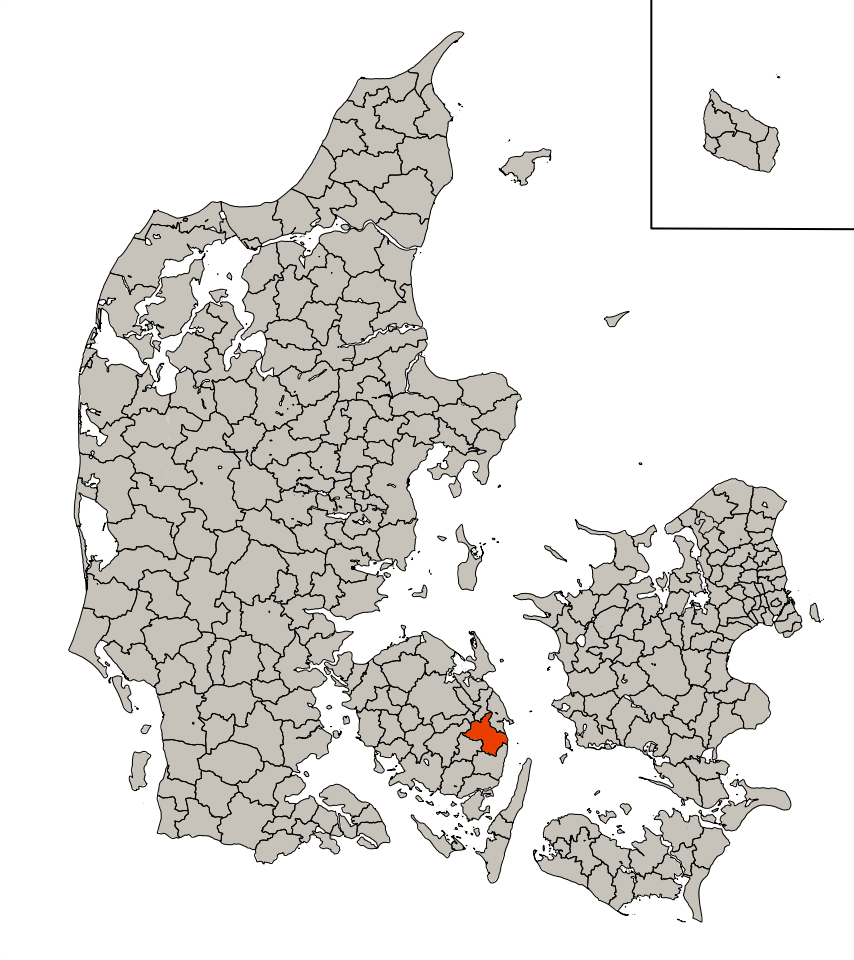
- Country: Denmark
- County: Funen
- Established: April 1, 1970
- Dissolved: December 31, 2006
- Seat: Ørbæk

Government
  - Last mayor: Kaf Refslund (V)

Area
  - Total: 138.34 km^{2} (53.41 sq mi)

Population (2006)
  - Total: 6,916
  - Density: 49.99/km^{2} (129.5/sq mi)
- Time zone: UTC1 (CET)
  - Summer (DST): UTC2 (CEST)
- Municipal code: 495

Until January 1, 2007 Ørbæk Municipality was a municipality (Danish: kommune) in the former Funen County, on the east coast of the island of Funen, in central Denmark. The municipality covered an area of 138.34 km^{2}, and had a total population of 6,916 (2006). Its last mayor was Kaf Refslund, a member of the Venstre party.

Ørbæk Municipality bordered Nyborg and Ullerslev Municipality to the north, Årslev Municipality to the northwest, Ringe Municipality to the west, Ryslinge Municipality to the southwest and Gudme Municipality to the south.

The municipality ceased to exist as the result of Kommunalreformen 2007 (the Municipality Reform of 2007). It was merged with Nyborg and Ullerslev municipalities to form a new Nyborg municipality. The new municipality belongs to Region of Southern Denmark.

== History ==
In the Middle Ages, when Denmark was divided into hundreds, the area of Ørbæk Municipality were under the hundreds of Vindinge and Gudme. In 1662 counties were established, and Ørbæk came under Nyborg County. It merged with Tranekær County in 1793 to form Svendborg County. In the 1970 Danish Municipal Reform Svendborg County was merged with Odense County to form Funen County. After the 2007 municipal reform Funen County came under the Region of Southern Denmark.

From 1842, where parish municipalities were created, and until 1966 the area of Ørbæk Municipality consisted of seven parish municipalities. They were merged in 1966 to form Ørbæk Parish Municipality, which then became Ørbæk Municipality in the 1970 Municipal Reform.

In the Municipality Reform of 2007 Ørbæk Municipality was merged with Nyborg and Ullerslev Municipality to form a new Nyborg Municipality.

It was in 2005 suggested that Ørbæk should not only be merged with Nyborg and Ullerslev, but also with the municipalities of Munkebo, Langeskov and Kerteminde to create one large Eastern Funen municipality. The reason was that the new Kerteminde Municipality would have too small of a population to function properly. In the end, Nyborg and Kerteminde weren't merged and became two separate municipalities.

=== Historical divisions ===
Historical municipal divisions of Ørbæk Municipality
2007	1970	1966	1947	1842	Towns
Nyborg Mun.	Ørbæk Mun.	Ørbæk Parish Mun.	Ørbæk Parish Mun.		Ørbæk
Nyborg Mun.	Ørbæk Mun.	Ørbæk Parish Mun.	Frørup Parish Mun.		Frørup
Nyborg Mun.	Ørbæk Mun.	Ørbæk Parish Mun.	Langå-Øksendrup Parish Mun.		Langå
Nyborg Mun.	Ørbæk Mun.	Ørbæk Parish Mun.	Svindinge Parish Mun.		Svindinge
Nyborg Mun.	Ørbæk Mun.	Ørbæk Parish Mun.	Herrested Parish Mun.		Måre
Nyborg Mun.	Ørbæk Mun.	Ørbæk Parish Mun.	Kullerup-Refsvindinge Parish Mun.		Refsvindinge
Nyborg Mun.	Ørbæk Mun.	Ørbæk Parish Mun.	Ellested Parish Mun.	Gislev-Ellested Parish Mun. (Note: Also part of today's Svendborg Municipality.)	Ellested
Nyborg Mun.	Nyborg Mun.				
Nyborg Mun.	Ullerslev Mun.				

== Towns ==
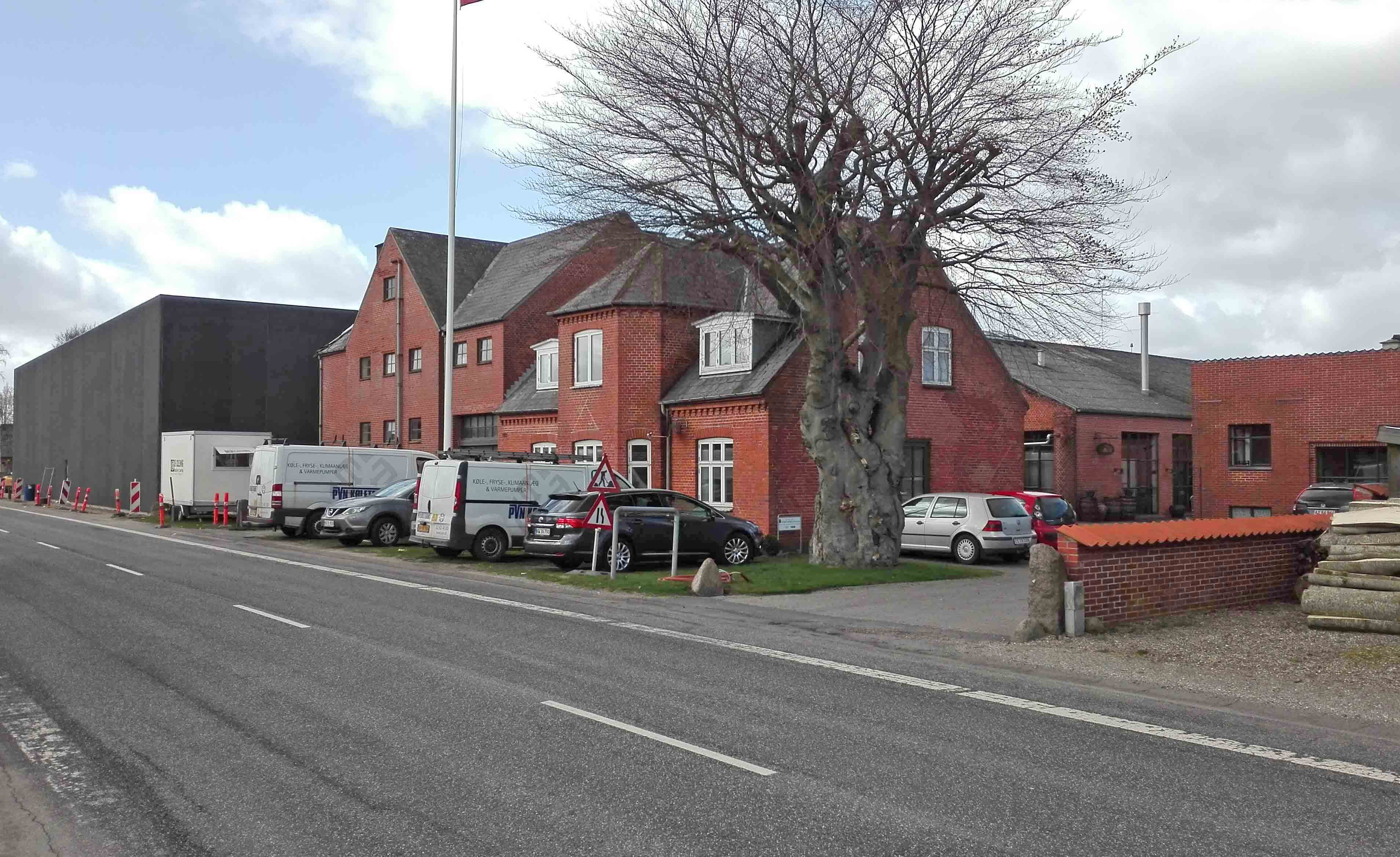
Ørbæk Brewery

Nearly half of the population of the municipality lived in small villages or rural areas. Approximately a fifth of the municipality's population lived in Ørbæk, which was the largest town in the municipality. The remaining population lived in the other five larger settlements in the municipality, these being Refsvindinge, Måre (including Herrested), Frørup, Tårup and Svindinge. Smaller villages in the municipality included Kullerup, Øksendrup, Tårup Strand and Langå.

Ørbæk was located centrally in the municipality, with Refsvindinge, Måre and Frørup spread out around Ørbæk. The town of Ørbæk is well known for its brewery. The brewery originate from 1906, and also acts as the headquarter for the Naturfrisk Group.

Below are the populations from 2006 of the six larger settlements of the municipality.

Ørbæk	1,540
Refsvindinge	568
Måre	499
Frørup	440
Tårup	306
Svindinge	292

== Politics ==
=== Municipal council ===
Below are the municipal council elected since the municipality's creation in 1970 and until 2001, which was the last election before the municipality was dissolved.

Election	Party							Total seats	Elected mayor
Election	A	B	C	F	V	Z	...	Total seats	Elected mayor
1970	4	2	2		7			15	Jens Jørgen Pedersen (V)
1974	4	2	1		7	1		15	Jens Jørgen Pedersen (V)
1978	4	1	1		7	2		15	Henrik Nielsen (V)
1981	4	1	2		7	1		15	Henrik Nielsen (V)
1985	5	1	1	1	7			15	Henrik Nielsen (V)
1989	6		1	1	6	1		15	Laurits Hansen (V)
1993	6		1	1	7			15	Laurits Hansen (V)
1997	5			1	8	1		15	Laurits Hansen (V)
2001	5		1	1	7		1	15	Kaj Refslund (V)
Data from Statistikbanken.dk and editions of Kommunal Aarbog

=== Mayors ===
Since the creation of the municipality in 1970 and until it was dissolved in 2007, the mayors of Ørbæk Municipality were:

#	Mayor	Party	Term
1	Jens Jørgen Pedersen	Venstre	1970-1978
2	Henrik Nielsen	Venstre	1978-1986
3	Laurits Hansen	Venstre	1986-2002
4	Kaj Refslund	Venstre	2002-2007

== Parishes ==
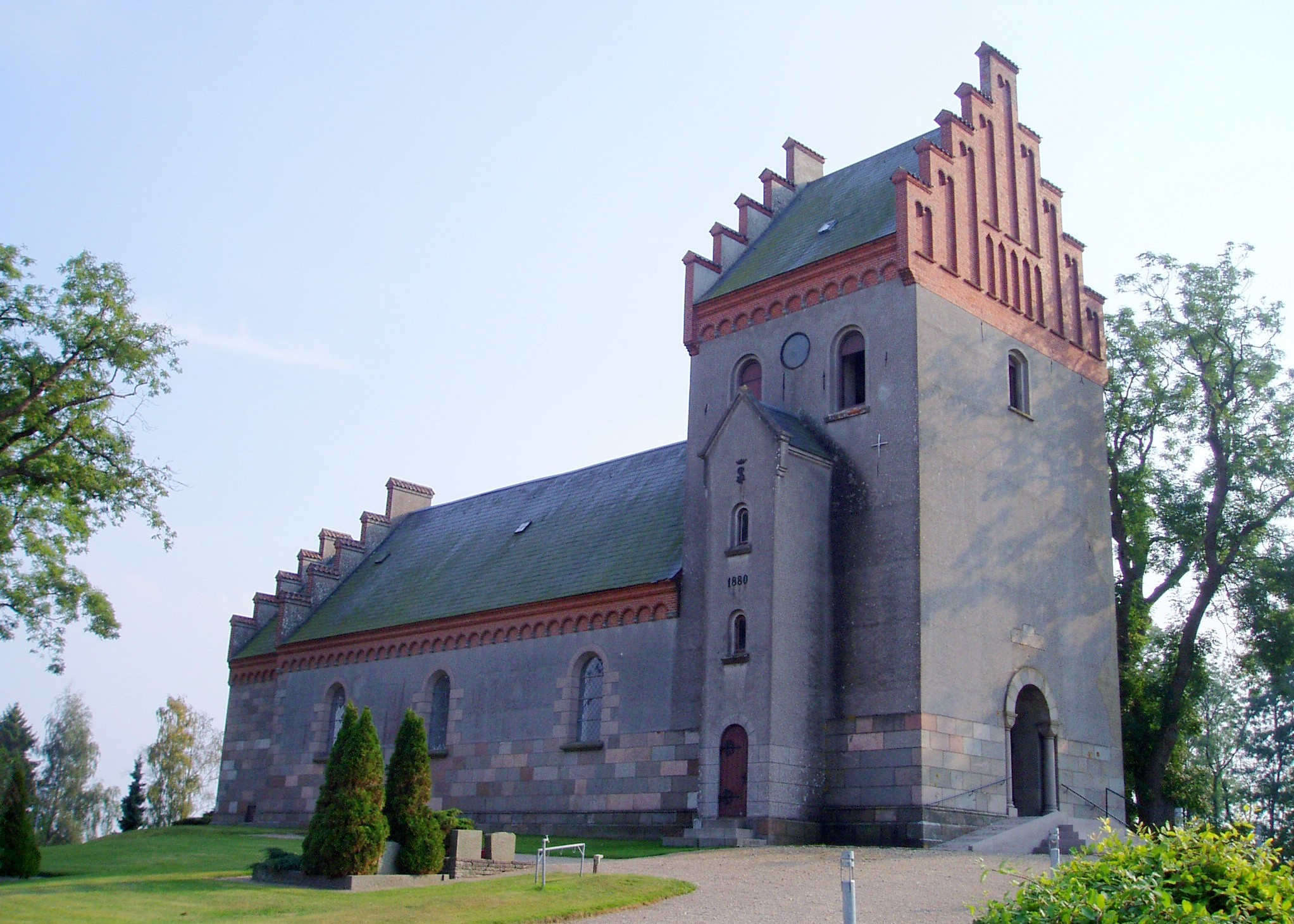
Herrested Church

The municipality consisted of nine parishes and nine churches.

- Ellested Parish (Ellested Church)
- Frørup Parish (Frørup Church)
- Herrested Parish (Herrested Church)
- Kullerup Parish (Kullerup Church)
- Langå Parish (Langå Church)
- Refsvindinge Parish (Refsvindinge Church)
- Svindinge Parish (Svindinge Church)
- Øksendrup Parish (Øksendrup Church)
- Ørbæk Parish (Ørbæk Church)

== Symbols ==
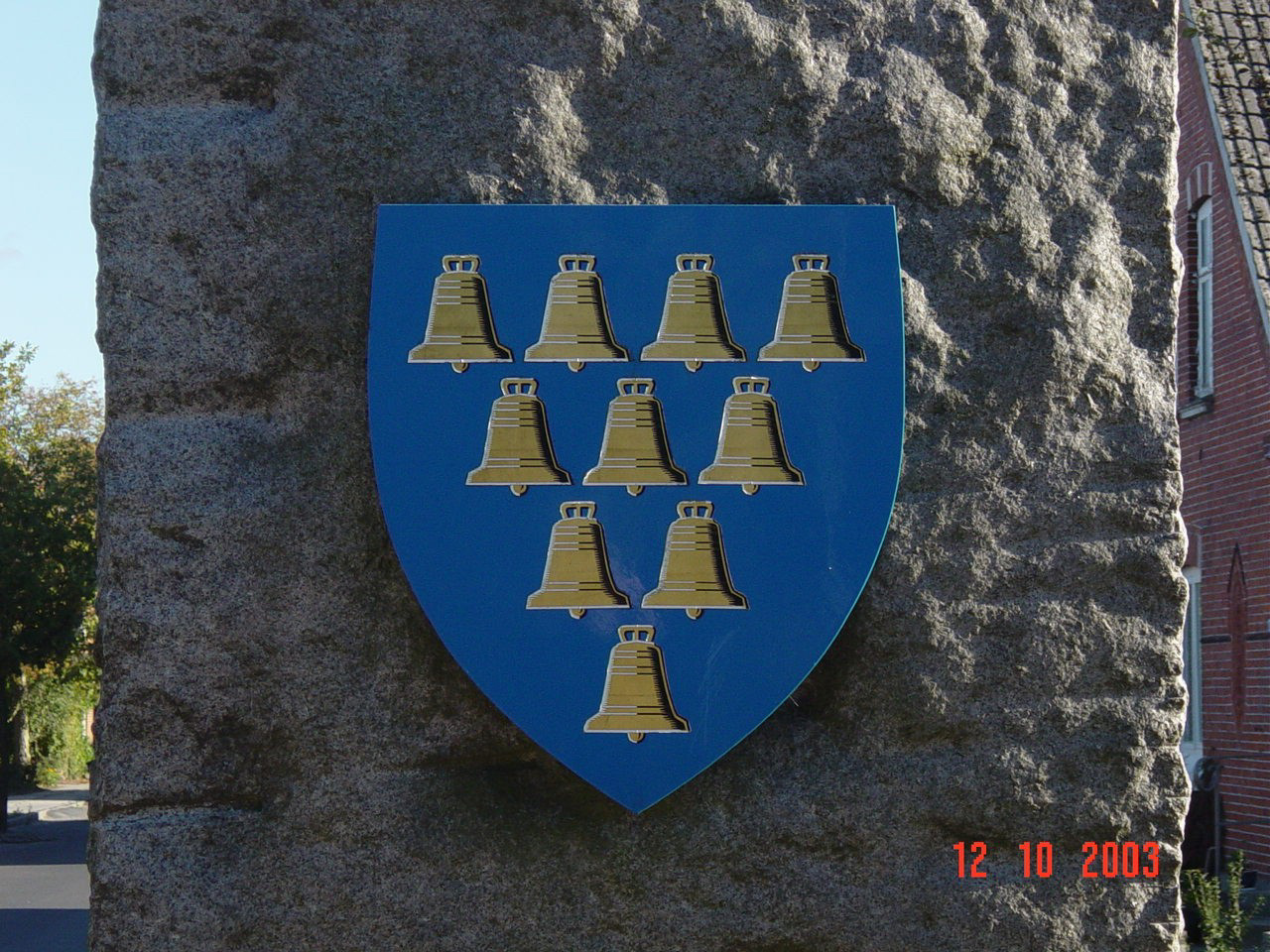
Coat of arms of Ørbæk Municipality

Ørbæk Municipality's coat of arm was ten yellow church bells, placed in a reverse pyramid. The bells represented the churches of the municipality. The background was blue. The coat of arms was designed by Palle Aagaard and Henning Terndrup.
