= List of churches in Nyborg Municipality =

This list of churches in Nyborg Municipality lists church buildings in Nyborg Municipality, Denmark.

== National Churches ==
=== Aunslev Church ===
Aunslev Church
- Aunslev Kirke
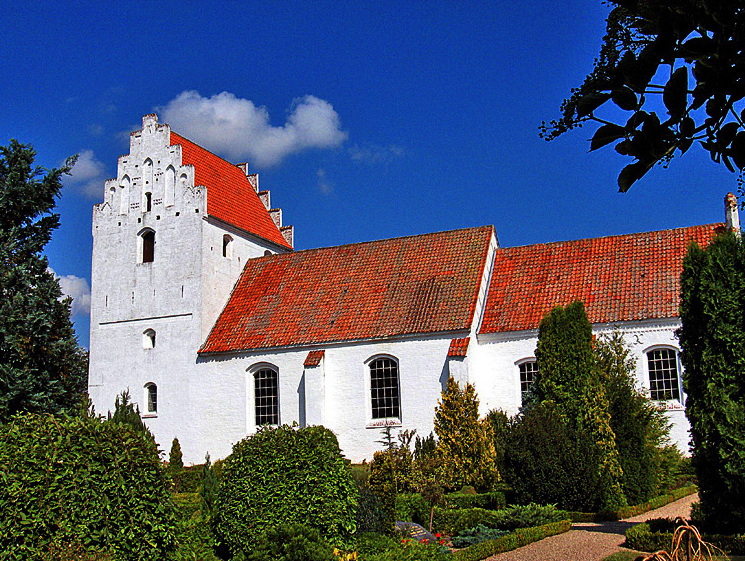
- Aunslev Church
- 55°21′16.5″N 10°42′46.84″E
- Location: Aunslev, Denmark
- Denomination: Church of Denmark

Administration
- Diocese: Diocese of Funen
- Deanery: Nyborg Provsti
- Parish: Aunslev Parish

Aunslev Church (also known as Sct. Blasius Church) is located in Aunslev. It is the only national church in Aunslev Parish. The church has a churchyard with a cemetery.

Aunslev Church was built around 1100. The Juel family, owners of the Juelsberg manor, are buried there.

The altar is from the 1600s from Odense. The baptismal font is in undecorated Romanesque style, built in granite. It is the oldest piece in the church. The organ is from 1984 from Aabenraa. The church has four bells, two built in Copenhagen from 1734 and 1764. After the Second World War, the citizens of Aunslev collected money to buy a 'peace bell' for the church. The first bell didn't meet the expectations, so another was built. This was in 1968.

Aunslev Hospital, located next to the church, is owned by the church. It is a former hospital, and later acted as a museum.

=== Bovense Church ===
Bovense Church
- Bovense Kirke
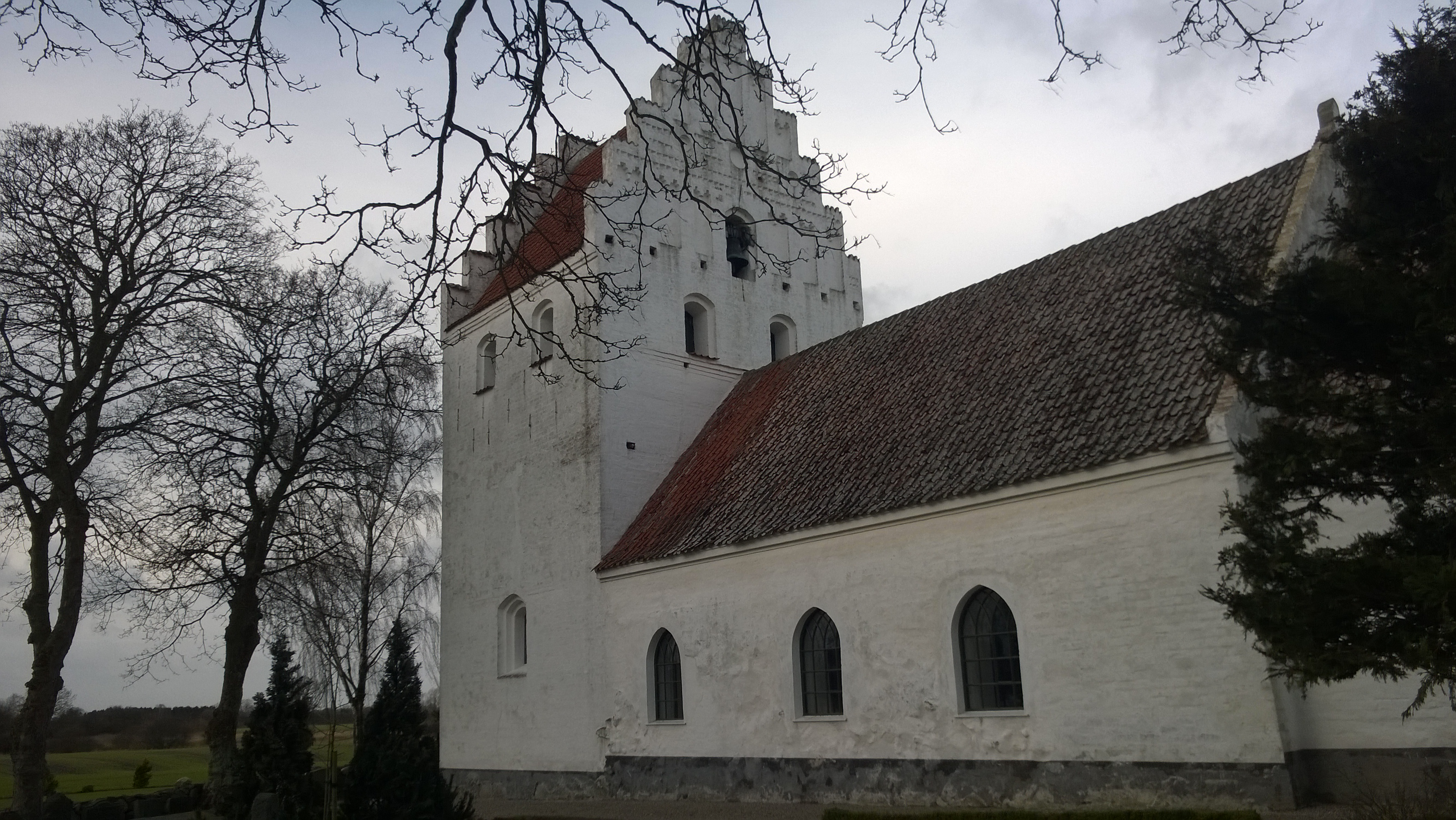
- Bovense Church
- 55°22′56.39″N 10°43′17.43″E
- Location: Bovense, Denmark
- Denomination: Church of Denmark

Administration
- Diocese: Diocese of Funen
- Deanery: Nyborg Provsti
- Parish: Bovense Parish

Bovense Church is located in Bovense. It is the only national church in Bovense Parish. The church has a churchyard with a cemetery.

Bovense Church was built around 1130.

The church has two bells. The largest one was built by Mattias Benninc in Lübeck in 1595. The other bell is from 1793, where it was given to the church by the Juelsberg manor. This bell is from Copenhagen. The church's altar is from 1753 with an altarpiece by Anton Dorph.

=== Ellested Church ===
Ellested Church
- Ellested Kirke
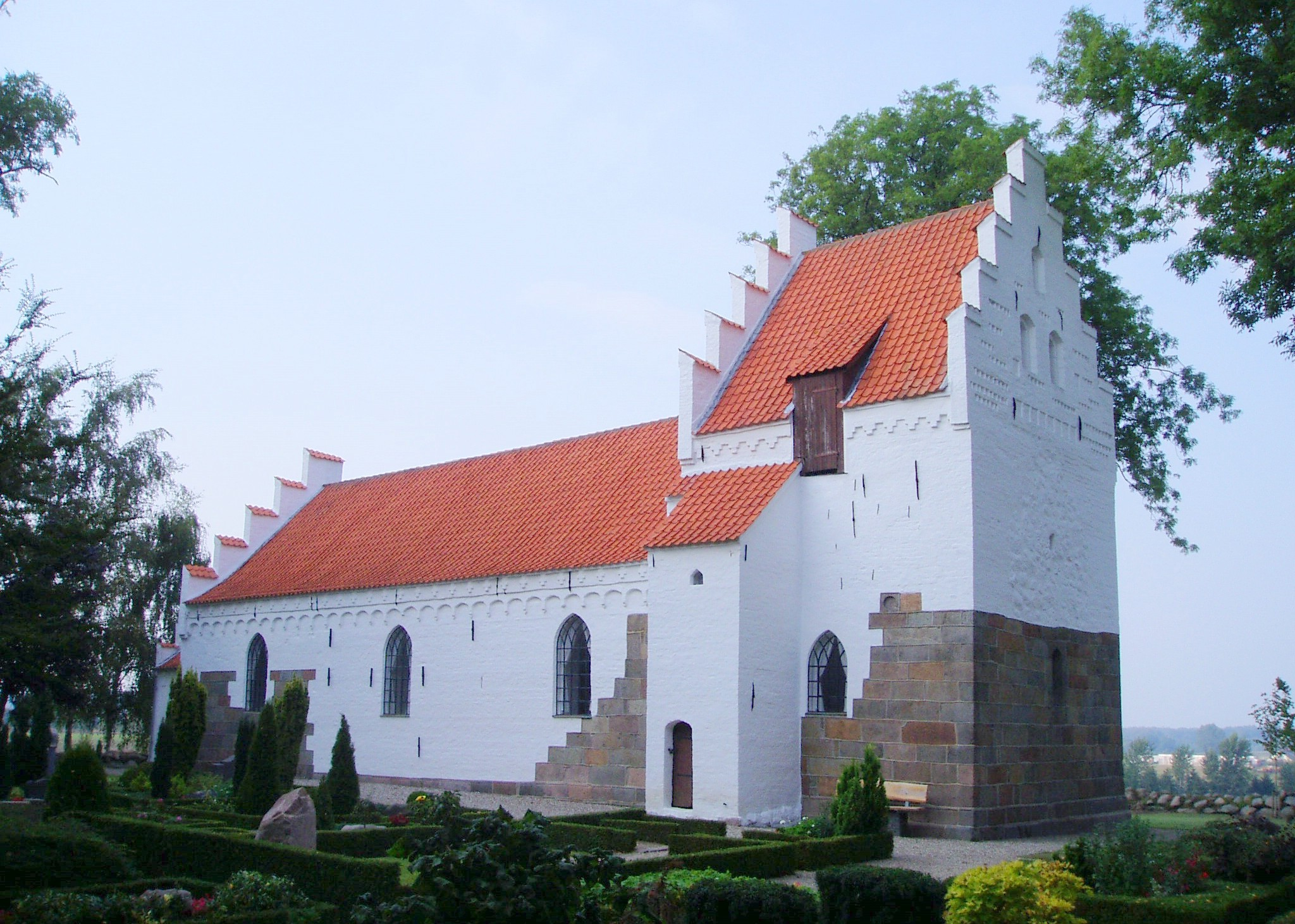
- Ellested Church
- 55°15′19.08″N 10°36′33.65″E
- Location: Ellested, Denmark
- Denomination: Church of Denmark

Administration
- Diocese: Diocese of Funen
- Deanery: Nyborg Provsti
- Parish: Ellested Parish

Ellested Church (also known as Nysted Church) is located in Ellested. It is the only national church in Ellested Parish. The church has a churchyard with a cemetery.

Ellested Church was built around 1130. On the cemetery, north of the church, is a sacrificial stone from the Bronze Age.

=== Ellinge Church ===
Ellinge Church
- Ellinge Kirke
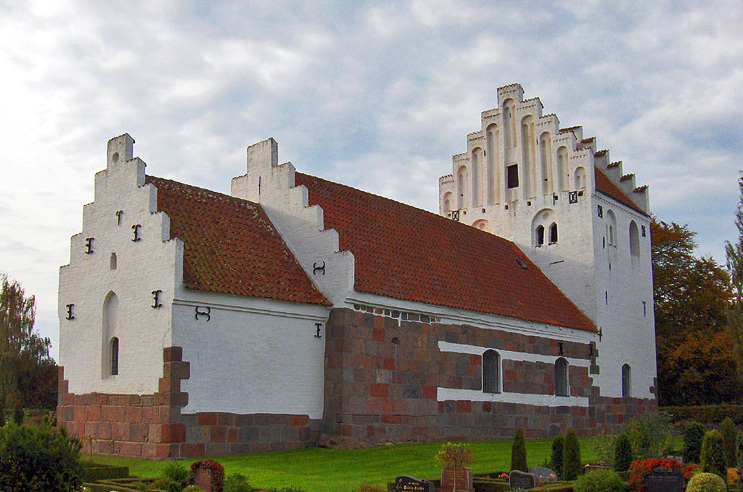
- Ellinge Church
- 55°18′59.39″N 10°37′8.43″E
- Location: Ellinge, Denmark
- Denomination: Church of Denmark

Administration
- Diocese: Diocese of Funen
- Deanery: Kerteminde Provsti
- Parish: Ellinge Parish

Ellinge Church is located in Ellinge. It is the only national church in Ellinge Parish. The church has a churchyard with a cemetery.

Ellinge Church was built around 1200. It was renovated in 1993.

The baptismal font is from Gotland.

=== Flødstrup Church ===
Flødstrup Church
- Flødstrup Kirke
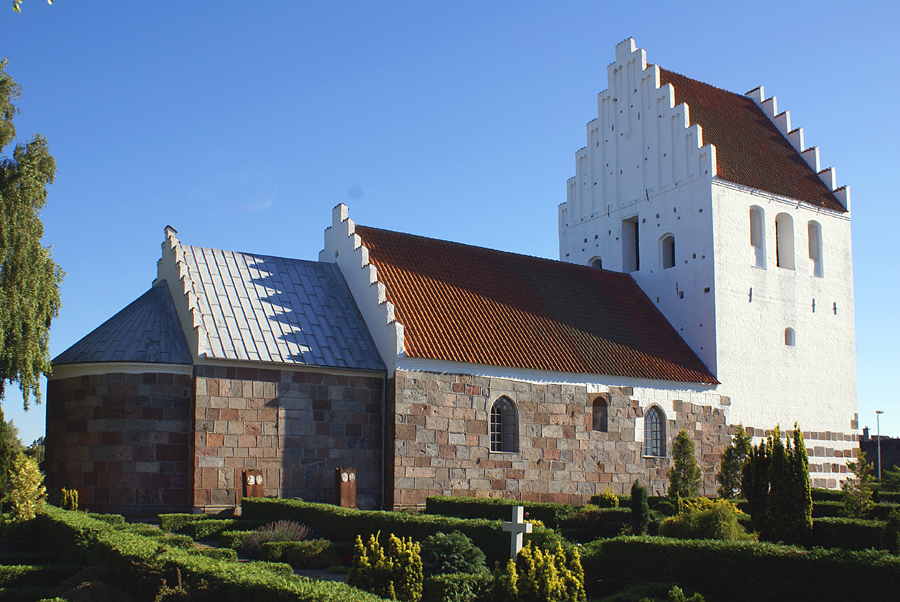
- Flødstrup Church
- 55°23′2.94″N 10°40′4.48″E
- Location: Flødstrup, Denmark
- Denomination: Church of Denmark

Administration
- Diocese: Diocese of Funen
- Deanery: Kerteminde Provsti
- Parish: Flødstrup Parish

Flødstrup Church (also known as Church of Our Lady, Danish: Vor Frue Kirke) is located in Flødstrup. It is the only national church in Flødstrup Parish. The church has a churchyard with a cemetery.

Flødstrup Church was built around 1150.

The church's two bells are from 1525 and 1780.

=== Frørup Church ===
Frørup Church
- Frørup Kirke
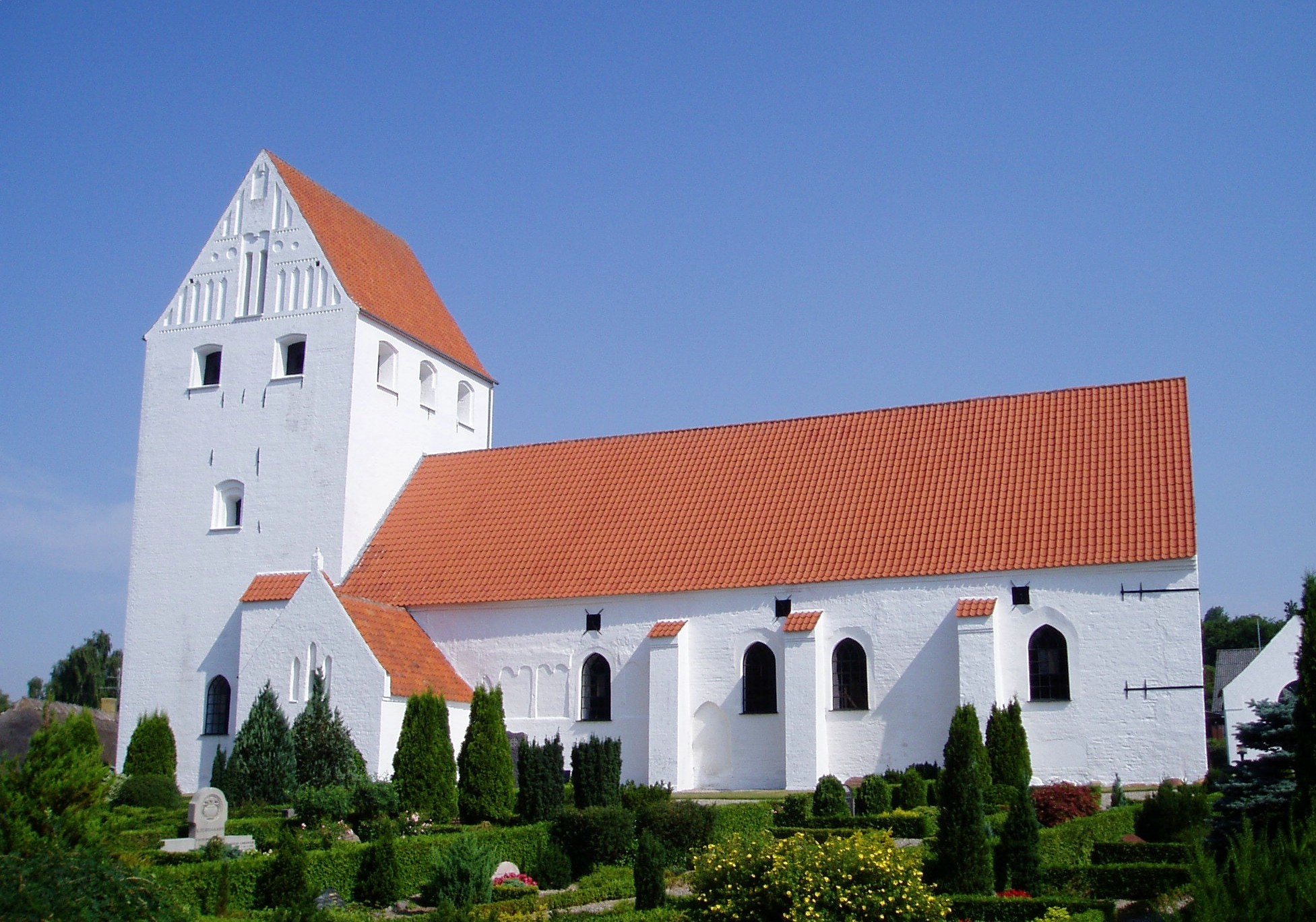
- Frørup Church
- 55°14′33.46″N 10°42′52.23″E
- Location: Frørup, Denmark
- Denomination: Church of Denmark

Administration
- Diocese: Diocese of Funen
- Deanery: Nyborg Provsti
- Parish: Frørup Parish

Frørup Church is located in Frørup. It is the only national church in Frørup Parish. The church has a churchyard with a cemetery.

Frørup Church was built around 1140. On the cemetery is a tombstone from the 1200s, belonging to an ironsmith named Mads Pebling.

The pews inside the church are from 1612, and were donated to the church by owner of Holckenhavn, Jacob Ulfeldt, after a fire in Frørup and Frørup Church. A model ship, of the 1780-built ship Christianshavn, was hung in the church in 1997.

=== Herrested Church ===
Herrested Church
- Herrested Kirke
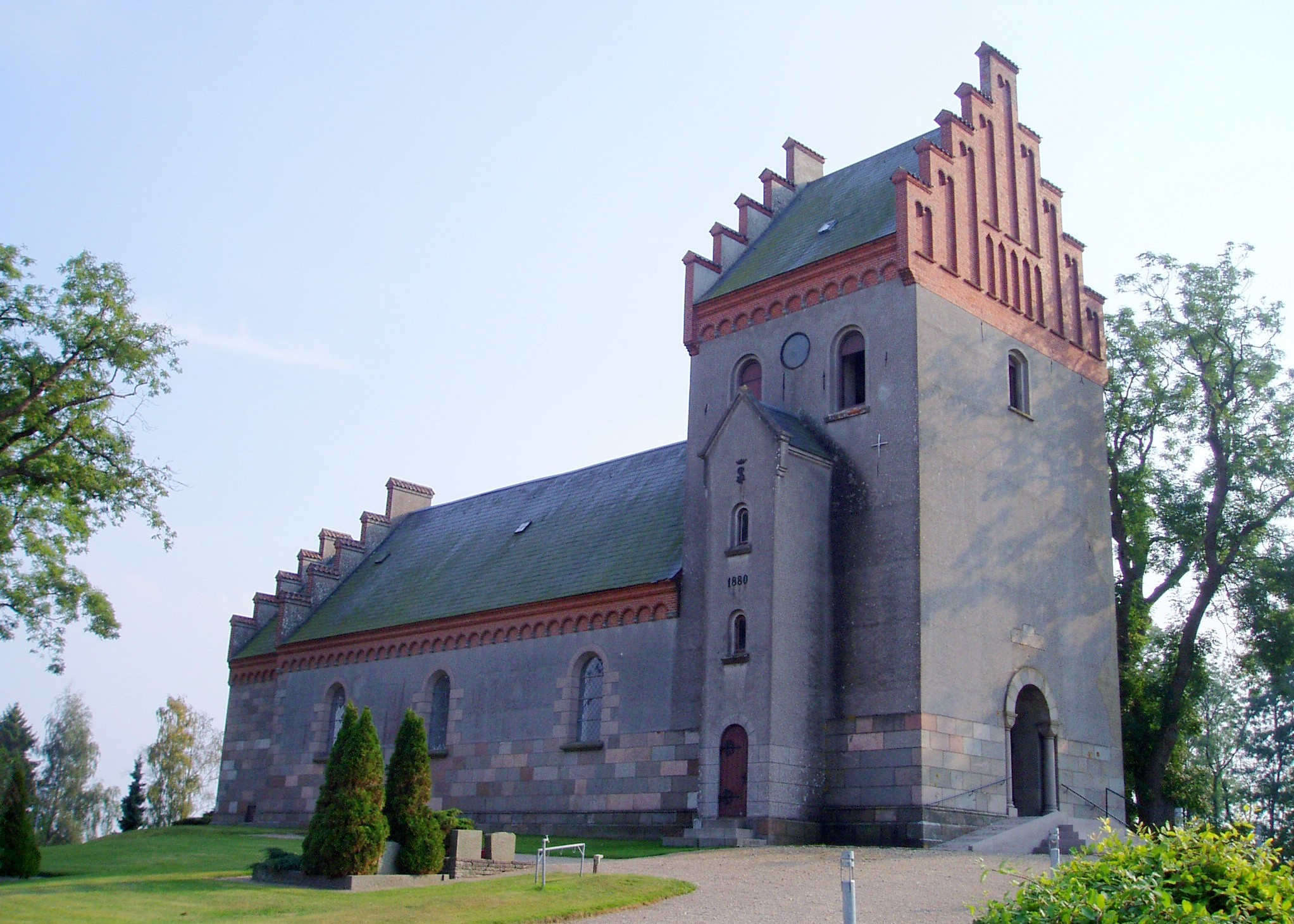
- Herrested Church
- 55°16′49.3″N 10°36′40.16″E
- Location: Måre, Denmark
- Denomination: Church of Denmark

Administration
- Diocese: Diocese of Funen
- Deanery: Nyborg Provsti
- Parish: Herrested Parish

Herrested Church is located in Måre. It is the only national church in Herrested Parish. The church has a churchyard with a cemetery.

Herrested Church and was built around 1130. Unlike most other churches in Denmark, Herrested Church isn't whitewashed. This is the result of a renovation from 1880. During these renovations, the church also got a turret clock, made by clockmaker Julius Bertram Larsen. The dial and hands of the clock are gilded.

=== Hjulby Church ===
Hjulby Church
- Hjulby Kirke
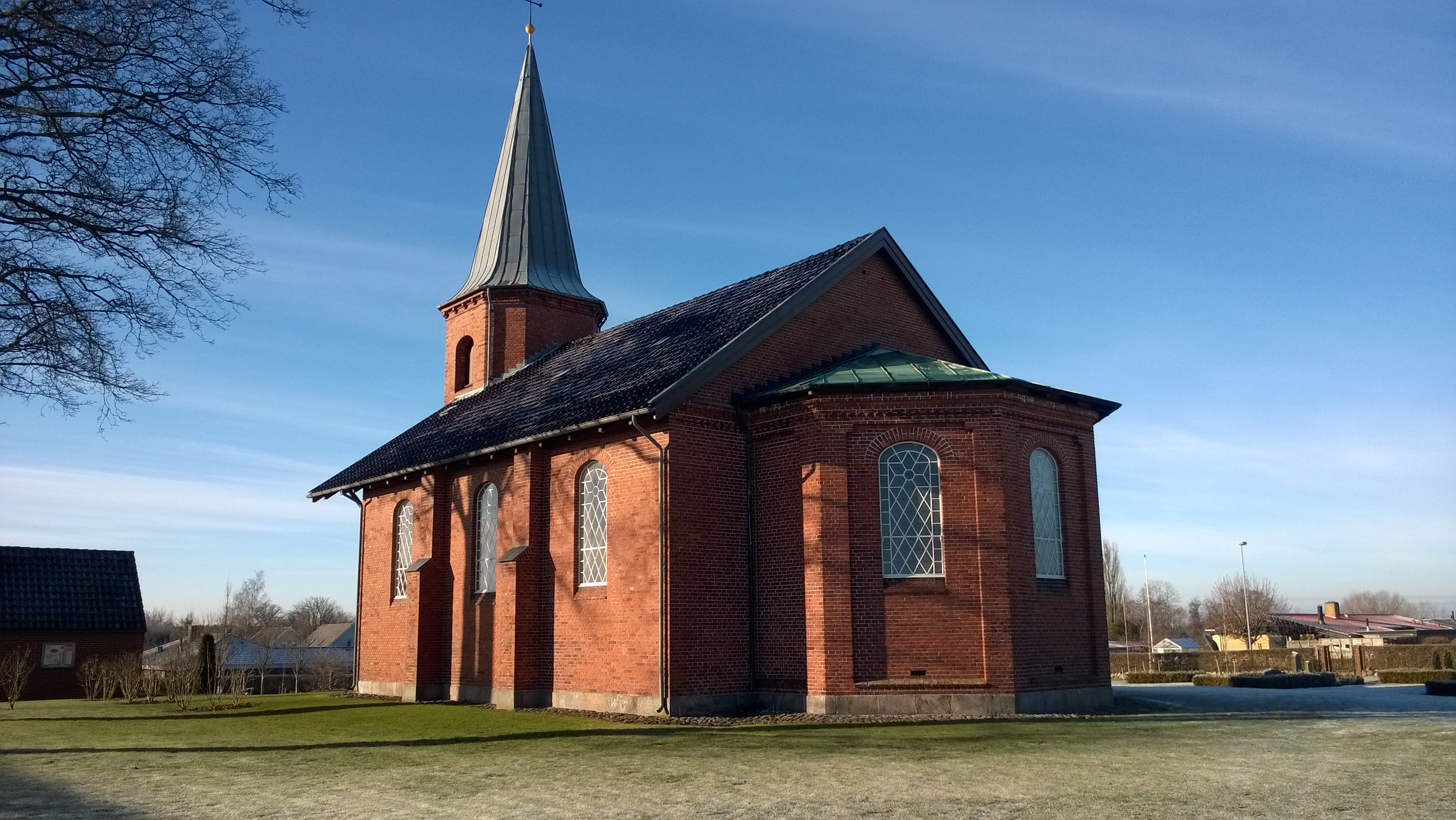
- Hjulby Church
- 55°20′19.2″N 10°44′24.4″E
- Location: Hjulby, Denmark
- Denomination: Church of Denmark

Administration
- Diocese: Diocese of Funen
- Deanery: Nyborg Provsti
- Parish: Hjulby Parish

Hjulby Church is located in Hjulby. It is the only national church in Hjulby Parish. The church has a churchyard with a cemetery.

Hjulby Church was built in 1882 by Vilhelm Tvede. Another church was previously located in Hjulby, but it was torn down in 1555.

The church's baptismal font is from 1876. The pulpit is from 1883. The organ is from 1979. The church bell is from 1883.

A votive ship built by a local man, Osvald Clausen, hang in the church. It was hung up in 1922 and later restored in 1964. It was created in memory of a man named Svend Danielsen (dead 13 July 1914).

=== Kullerup Church ===
Kullerup Church
- Kullerup Kirke
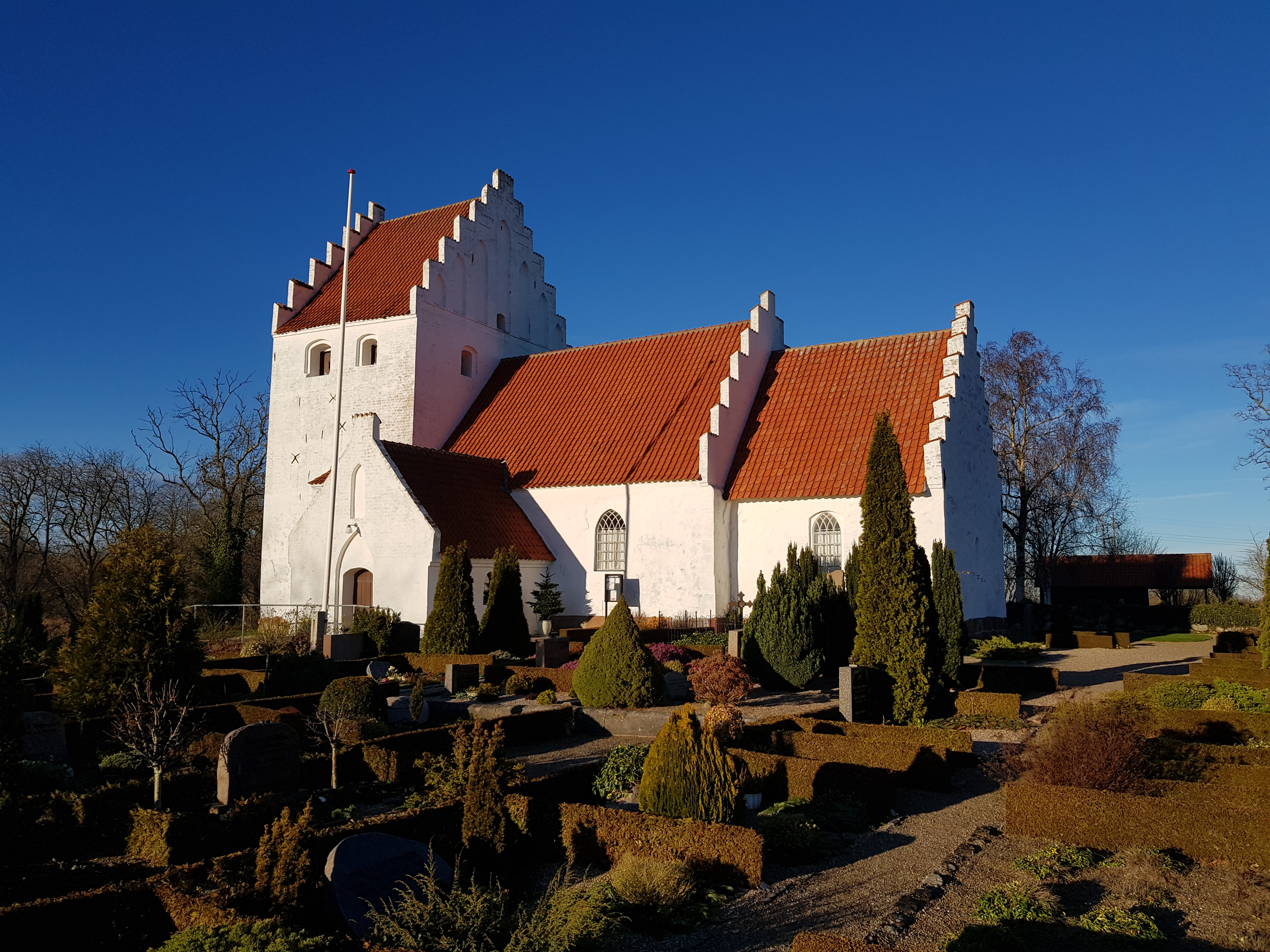
- Kullerup Church
- 55°19′4.43″N 10°42′11.42″E
- Location: Kullerup, Denmark
- Denomination: Church of Denmark

Administration
- Diocese: Diocese of Funen
- Deanery: Nyborg Provsti
- Parish: Kullerup Parish

Kullerup Church is located in Kullerup. It is the only national church in Kullerup Parish. The church has a churchyard with a cemetery.

Kullerup Church was built around 1130. Two mosaics by Maja Lisa Engelhardt were added to the church in 2001.

=== Langå Church ===
Langå Church
- Langå Kirke
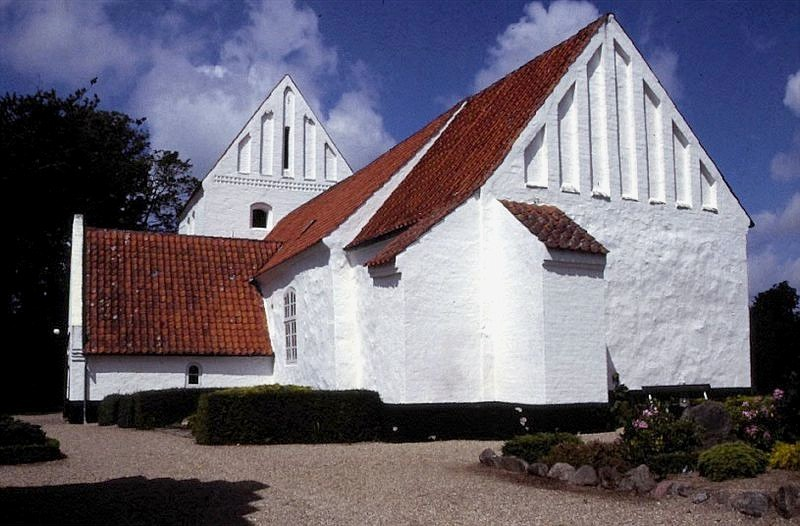
- Langå Church
- 55°11′41.7″N 10°43′30.1″E
- Location: Langå, Denmark
- Denomination: Church of Denmark

History
- Founded: 1100s

Administration
- Diocese: Diocese of Funen
- Deanery: Nyborg Provsti
- Parish: Langå Parish

Langå Church is located in Langå. It is the only national church in Langå Parish. The church has a churchyard with a cemetery.

Langå Church was built around 1130. Much of the church wasn't built until 1500.

It houses the oldest bell of the municipality, originating from around 1200. The other bell in the church is from 1838. The altarpiece is from 1673. Inside the church is a large tomb stone from 1537, with carved figures of the owners of Rygaard manor from that time, Johan Urne and Anna Rønnow. The pulpit is from 1635. A wooden plank, named "the small plank" (Danish: den lille bjælke) is located in the church. It has the inscription "Domine Jesu iuva Tyge Lauridtsøn 1696", and has survived two fires. It was found by clockmaker August Larsen, and was donated to Langå Church after his death in 1953. Thomas Laub has been living in Langå Church's rectory.

=== Nyborg Church ===
Nyborg Church
- Nyborg Kirke
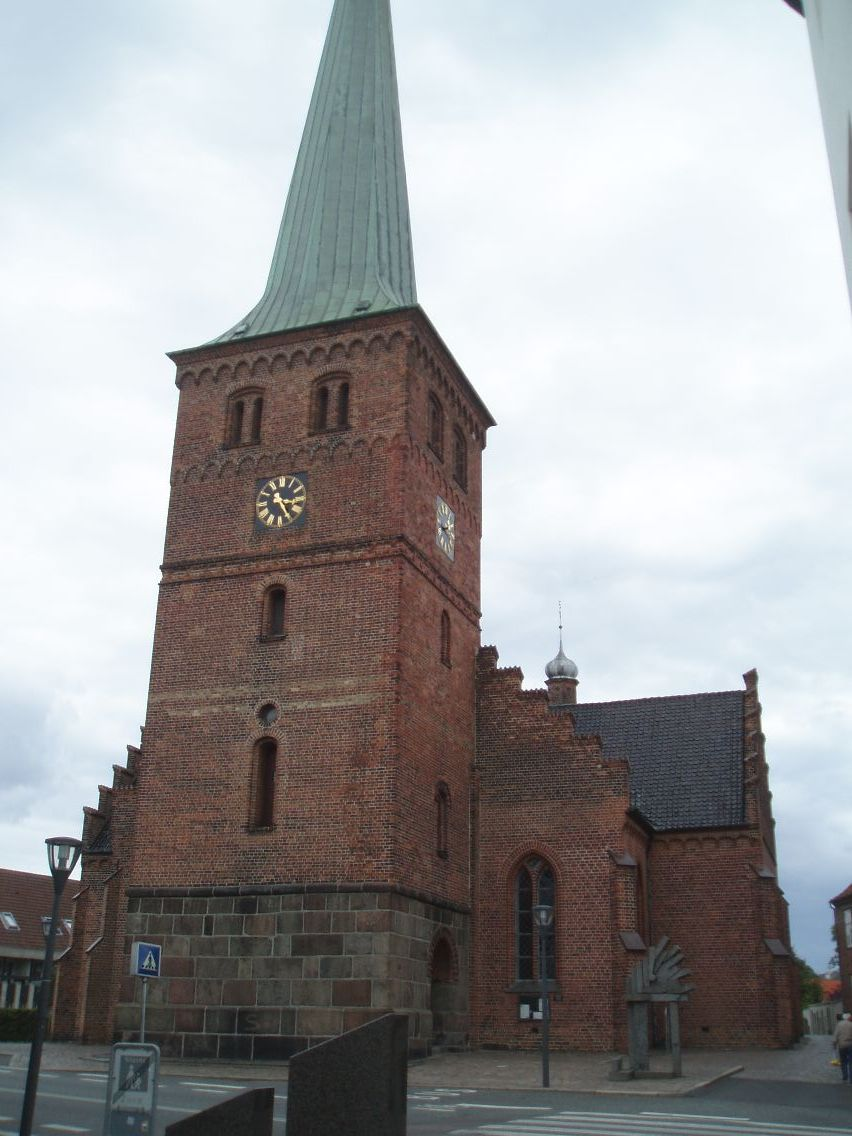
- Nyborg Church
- 55°18′41.35″N 10°47′34.92″E
- Location: Nyborg, Denmark
- Denomination: Church of Denmark

Architecture
- Completed: 1428

Administration
- Diocese: Diocese of Funen
- Deanery: Nyborg Provsti
- Parish: Nyborg Parish

Nyborg Church (also known as Church of Our Lady, Danish: Vor Frue Kirke) is located in Nyborg. It is the one of two national churches in Nyborg Parish, the other being Steengårds Church in Nyborg Prison.

The church is located in the center of Nyborg, and was built in 1375–1428. It was renovated in the 1970s and again in 2005.

The church has two organs, from 1973 by Poul-Gerhard Andersen and 1830 by P.U.F. Demant. The crucifix is the only piece of inventory from the church's opening in 1428. It is decorated with biblical depictions. Maja Lisa Engelhardt created the altar crucifix, of gilded bronze, in 2011. Maja Lisa Engelhardt also created a mosaic for the church in 2015. The largest of the church's chandeliers was donated in 1640 by the mayor's widow, Sidsel Knudsdatter. The other chandelier was donated by mayor Mads Lerke in 1589. The renaissance baptismal font was donated to the church in 1585 by mayor Peder Jensen Skriver. The other baptismal font is Romanesque style in granite, from 1100. Inside the church is a gate from 1649, built by Christian IV's smith, Caspar Fincke. The pulpit is from 1653, made by Anders Mortensen in Odense. The pulpit's staircase is even older. The church has a set of wooden figures of John the Apostle and Jeremiah. Like the pulpit, they were also carved by Anders Mortensen. A candle globe, made by local artisan Flemming Knudsen, was added to the church in 2008.

The church's turret clock, nicknamed "the Syrian tank" (Danish: Den syriske kampvogn) was replaced by an electric movement in 1972. The original mechanical movement was built by Henrik Kyhl from Copenhagen, and initially created for Viborg Cathedral, who couldn't afford it. It was instead bought by Nyborg Church. In 2002 it was donated to Post- og Telemuseet in Copenhagen.

=== Refsvindinge Church ===
Refsvindinge Church
- Refsvindinge Kirke
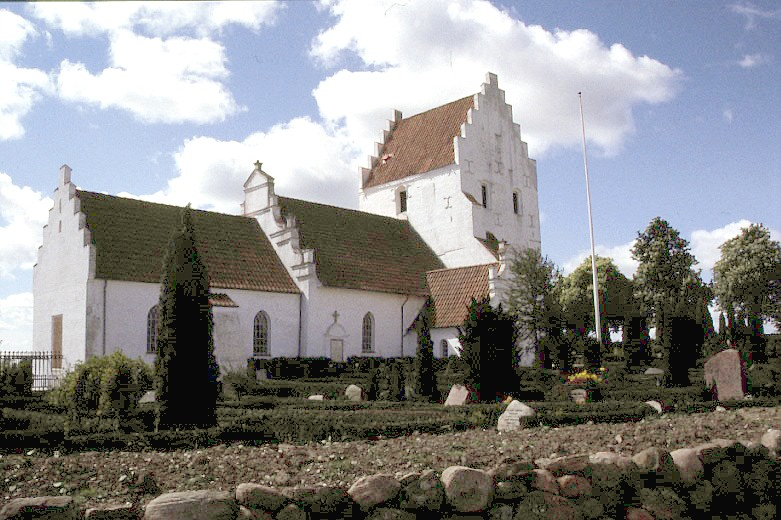
- Refsvindinge Church
- 55°16′59.39″N 10°40′20.15″E
- Location: Refsvindinge, Denmark
- Denomination: Church of Denmark

History
- Founded: 1150-1200

Administration
- Diocese: Diocese of Funen
- Deanery: Nyborg Provsti
- Parish: Refsvindinge Parish

Refsvindinge Church is located in Refsvindinge. It is the only national church in Refsvindinge Parish. The church has a churchyard with a cemetery.

The church was built between 1150 and 1200.

=== Skellerup Church ===
Skellerup Church
- Skellerup Kirke
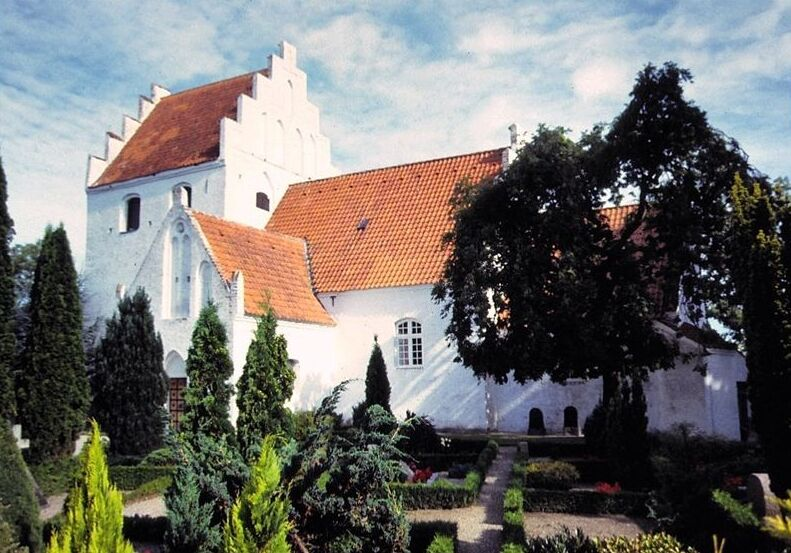
- Skellerup Church
- 55°20′30.61″N 10°39′30.63″E
- Location: Skellerup, Denmark
- Denomination: Church of Denmark

History
- Founded: 1150–1200

Administration
- Diocese: Diocese of Funen
- Deanery: Kerteminde Provsti
- Parish: Skellerup Parish

Skellerup Church is located in Skellerup. It is the only national church in Skellerup Parish. The church has a churchyard with a cemetery.

The church was built between 1150 and 1200.

The baptismal font is from 1666.

=== Steengårds Church ===
Steengårds Church
- Steengårds Kirke
- 55°18′46.22″N 10°46′37″E
- Location: Nyborg, Denmark
- Denomination: Church of Denmark

Architecture
- Completed: 2004

Administration
- Diocese: Diocese of Funen
- Deanery: Nyborg Provsti
- Parish: Nyborg Parish

Steengårds Church is located in Nyborg State Prison in Nyborg. It is one of two national churches in Nyborg Parish. The church is located inside the prison, and is not open to the public, unlike other national churches.

Steengårds Church, and the Churches in Nyborg State Prison, are located in Nyborg Prison in Nyborg. Two chapels were built, along with the prison, in 1912–1913, though both were quickly put out of use after another church was built in 1923. Attending church on Sundays was mandatory, unless the prisoners could document that they followed another church. In 1933 it was no longer mandatory, and attending church became optional and a service to the prisoners. A praying room for the prison's Muslims was established in 2004. Also in 2004, the old church was no longer in use and a former gym was turned into a series of other rooms, including the current church. The church's altar painting from around 2002 was painted by Tove Lorentzen.

=== Svindinge Church ===
Svindinge Church
- Svindinge Kirke
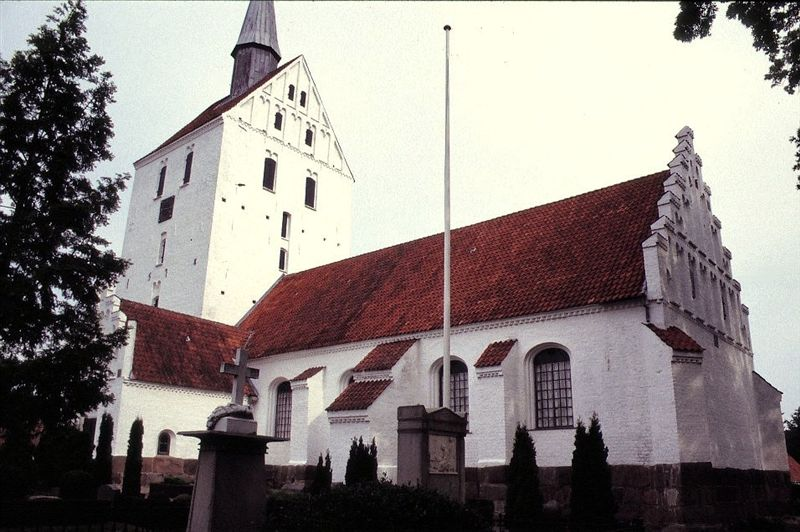
- Svindinge Church
- 55°13′0.17″N 10°41′12.83″E
- Location: Svindinge, Denmark
- Denomination: Church of Denmark

Architecture
- Completed: 1578

Administration
- Diocese: Diocese of Funen
- Deanery: Nyborg Provsti
- Parish: Svindinge Parish

Svindinge Church is located in Svindinge. It is the only national church in Svindinge Parish. The church has a churchyard with a cemetery.

Svindinge Church was built in the period 1571–78. The construction was ordered by Christoffer Valckendorf, the owner of Glorup manor at the time. A local story tells of a jötunn from Langeland, who was upset with Svindinge Church's tall steeple and threw a giant rock at the church. She failed to hit, and instead the stone landed near Hesselager, where it is located today.

The church has three bells. The largest is known as "Saint Peter's Rooster" (Danish: Skt. Peders Hane) and is from 1572. The two smaller bells are from 1724. The altarpiece is by Siegwald Dahl. The church's organ is from the 1960s.

=== Tårup Church ===
Tårup Church
- Tårup Kirke
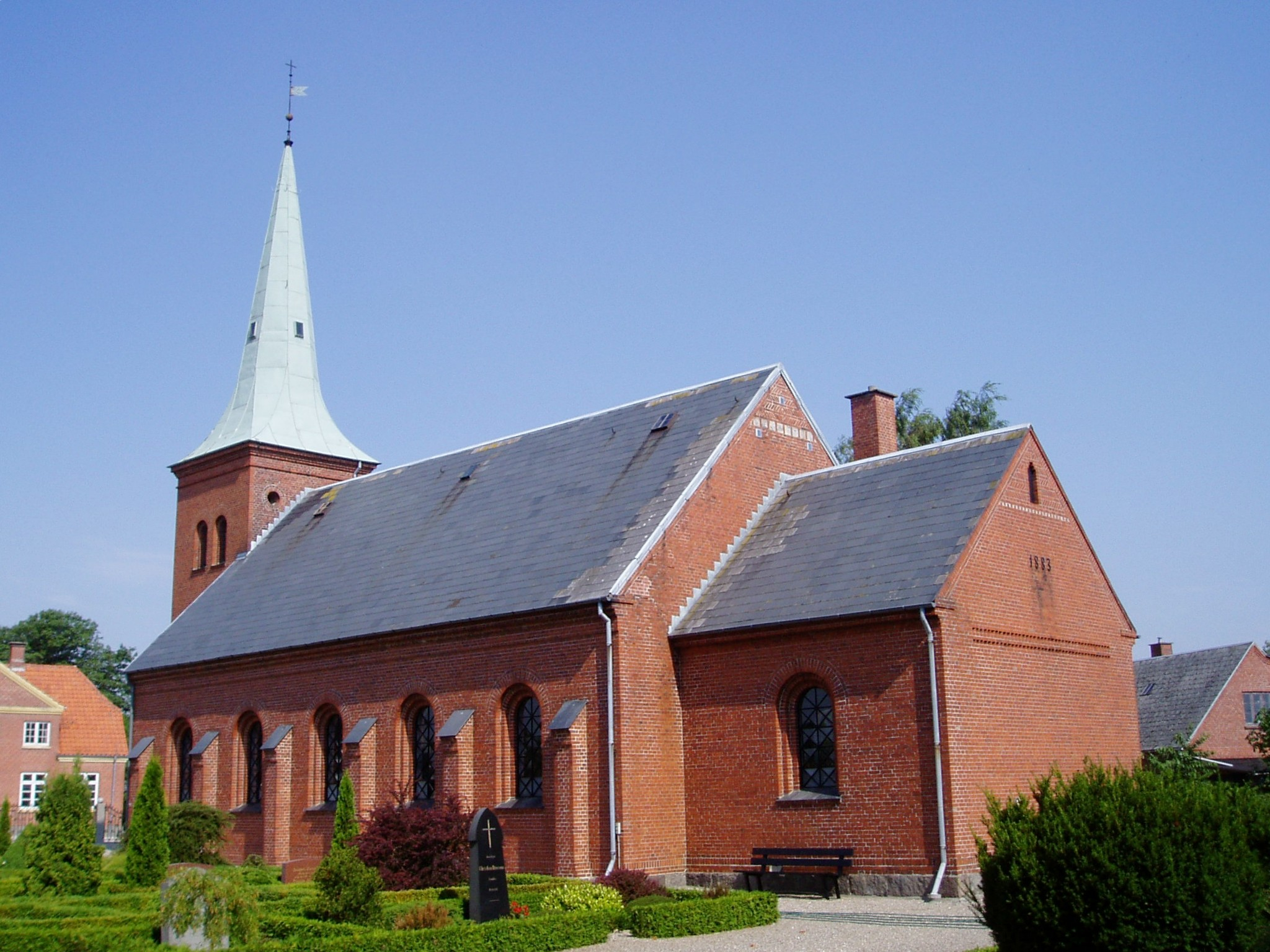
- Tårup Church
- 55°14′3.98″N 10°46′25.82″E
- Location: Tårup, Denmark
- Denomination: Church of Denmark

Architecture
- Completed: 1883

Administration
- Diocese: Diocese of Funen
- Deanery: Nyborg Provsti
- Parish: Tårup Parish

Tårup Church is located in Tårup. It is the only national church in Tårup Parish. The church has a churchyard with a cemetery.

Tårup Church was built in 1883 by Jens Eckersberg.

The church's current organ is from 2001. A votive ship was bought during the church's 100-year anniversary in 1983. The ship is a model of a ship that sailed in the Great Belt Strait when the church was built in 1883. The two bells in the church are from the Netherlands and were built in 1972.

=== Ullerslev Church ===
Ullerslev Church
- Ullerslev Kirke
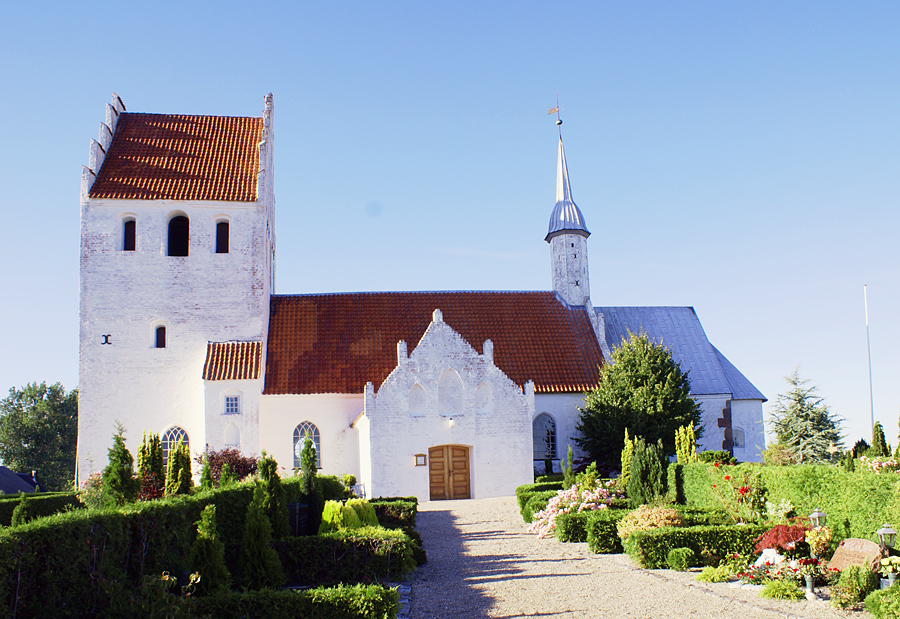
- Ullerslev Church
- 55°21′50.26″N 10°39′50.11″E
- Location: Ullerslev, Denmark
- Denomination: Church of Denmark

History
- Founded: 1100s

Administration
- Diocese: Diocese of Funen
- Deanery: Kerteminde Provsti
- Parish: Ullerslev Parish

Ullerslev Church is located in Ullerslev. It is the only national church in Ullerslev Parish. The church has a churchyard with a cemetery.

The church was built around 1150.

The crucifix is from 1520, and the church's two bells are from 1433 and 1906.

=== Vindinge Church ===
Vindinge Church
- Vindinge Kirke
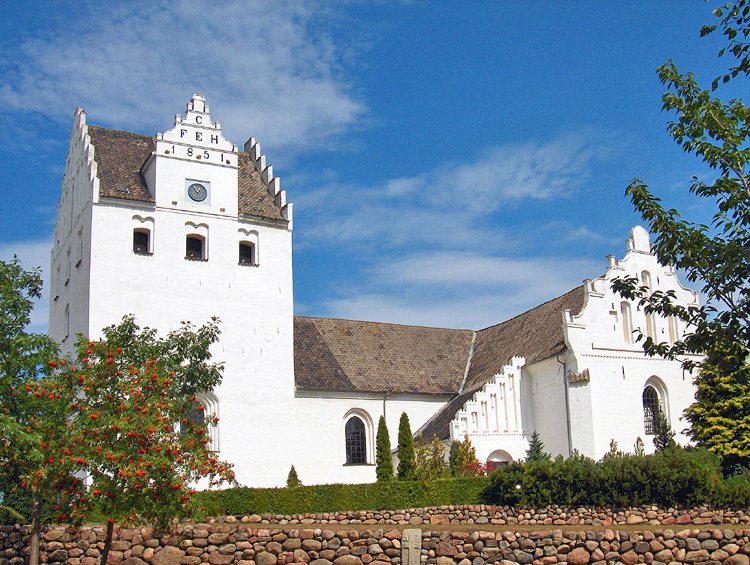
- Vindinge Church
- 55°18′34.47″N 10°43′58.41″E
- Location: Vindinge, Denmark
- Denomination: Church of Denmark

History
- Founded: 1181

Administration
- Diocese: Diocese of Funen
- Deanery: Nyborg Provsti
- Parish: Vindinge Parish

Vindinge Church is located in Vindinge. It is the only national church in Vindinge Parish. The church has a churchyard with a cemetery.

Vindinge Church was built in 1181.

The altarpiece is from 1480. The church was renovated in 1850, where the former baptismal font disappeared and was replaced by a baptismal font in marble.

=== Øksendrup Church ===
Øksendrup Church
- Øksendrup Kirke
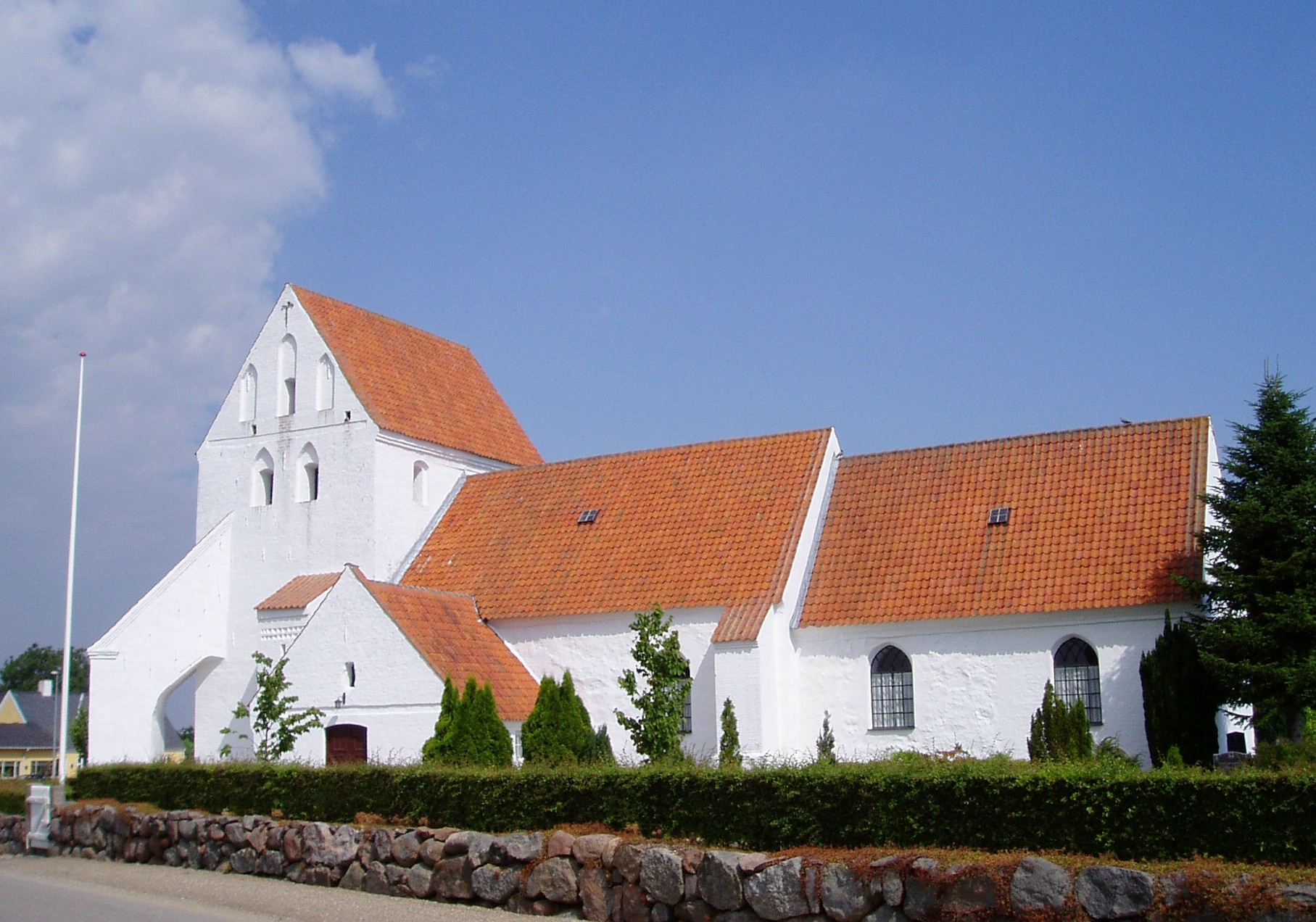
- Øksendrup Church
- 55°13′9.14″N 10°44′3.11″E
- Location: Øksendrup, Denmark
- Denomination: Church of Denmark

History
- Founded: 1100s

Administration
- Diocese: Diocese of Funen
- Deanery: Nyborg Provsti
- Parish: Øksendrup Parish

Øksendrup Church is located in Øksendrup. It is the only national church in Øksendrup Parish. The church has a churchyard with a cemetery.

Øksendrup Church was built in the 1100s.

The church has two bells, one built in 1636 in Lübeck and the other in 1891 in Odense. The altar's table cloth was sewn by local woman in 1970. The baptismal font is approximately as old as the church itself, made in Romanesque style in granite. The baptismal basin was donated by Glorup manor around 1600. The pulpit is from 1590, and made from oak wood. The church's organ was built in 1885 in Copenhagen, but wasn't added to the church until 1921. The crucifix is from around 1500.

=== Ørbæk Church ===
Ørbæk Church
- Ørbæk Kirke
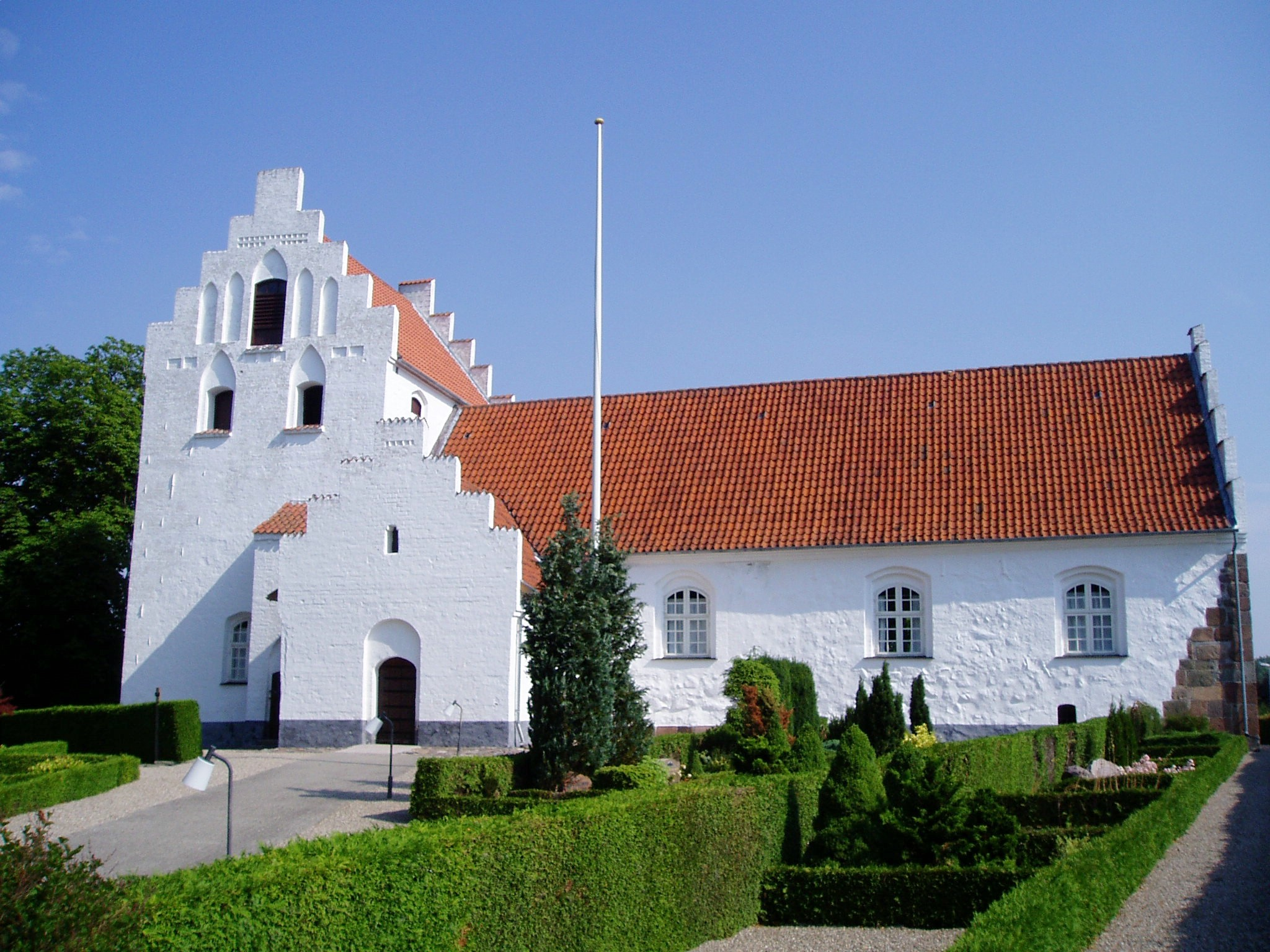
- Ørbæk Church
- 55°15′13.39″N 10°40′14.39″E
- Location: Ørbæk, Denmark
- Denomination: Church of Denmark

History
- Founded: Ca. 1200

Administration
- Diocese: Diocese of Funen
- Deanery: Nyborg Provsti
- Parish: Ørbæk Parish

Ørbæk Church is located in Ørbæk. It is the only national church in Ørbæk Parish. The church has a churchyard with a cemetery.

Ørbæk Church was built around 1200.

The granite baptismal font is as old as the church, with a Dutch baptismal basin from 1625. There are three chandeliers in the church. The oldest of the three is from 1709, donated by priest Christian Michael Luja at his wedding. Another chandelier was donated in 1737 and the last in 1927. A model ship was donated to the church in 1932, but depicts no particular ship. The church has two bells, one from 1778 and one from 1692. Former owner of Ørbæklunde manor are buried in a crypt under the church.

== Other churches ==
=== Nyborg Advent Church ===
Nyborg Advent Church
- Nyborg Adventistkirke
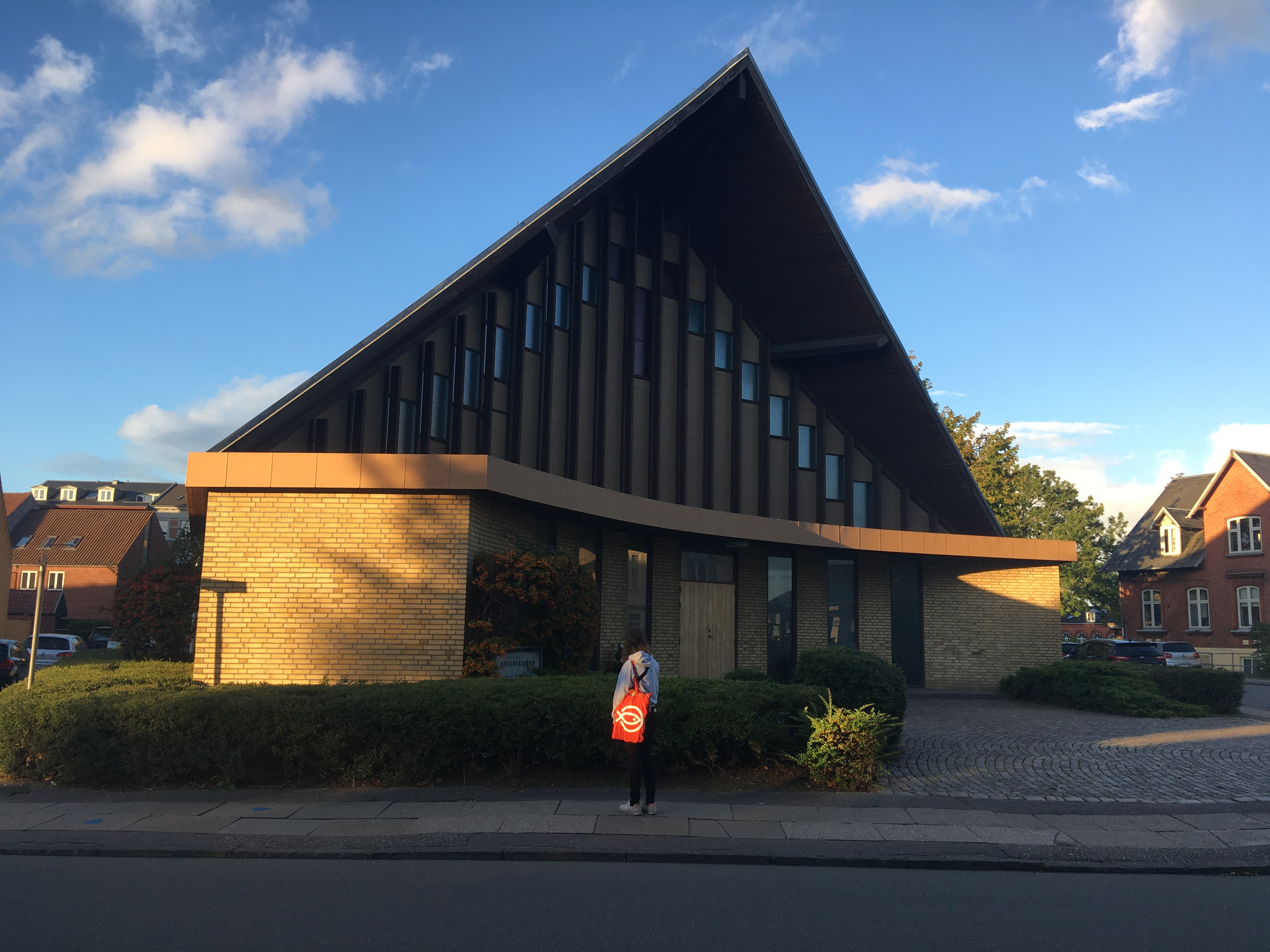
- Nyborg Advent Church
- 55°18′37.62″N 10°47′45.84″E
- Location: Nyborg, Denmark
- Denomination: Seventh-day Adventist Church

Architecture
- Completed: 1975

Nyborg Advent Church is a Seventh-day Adventist church located in Nyborg. It is located near the center of Nyborg, and was built in 1975.

== Chapels ==
=== Nyborg Cemetery Chapel ===
Nyborg Cemetery Chapel
- Nyborg Kirkegårdskapel
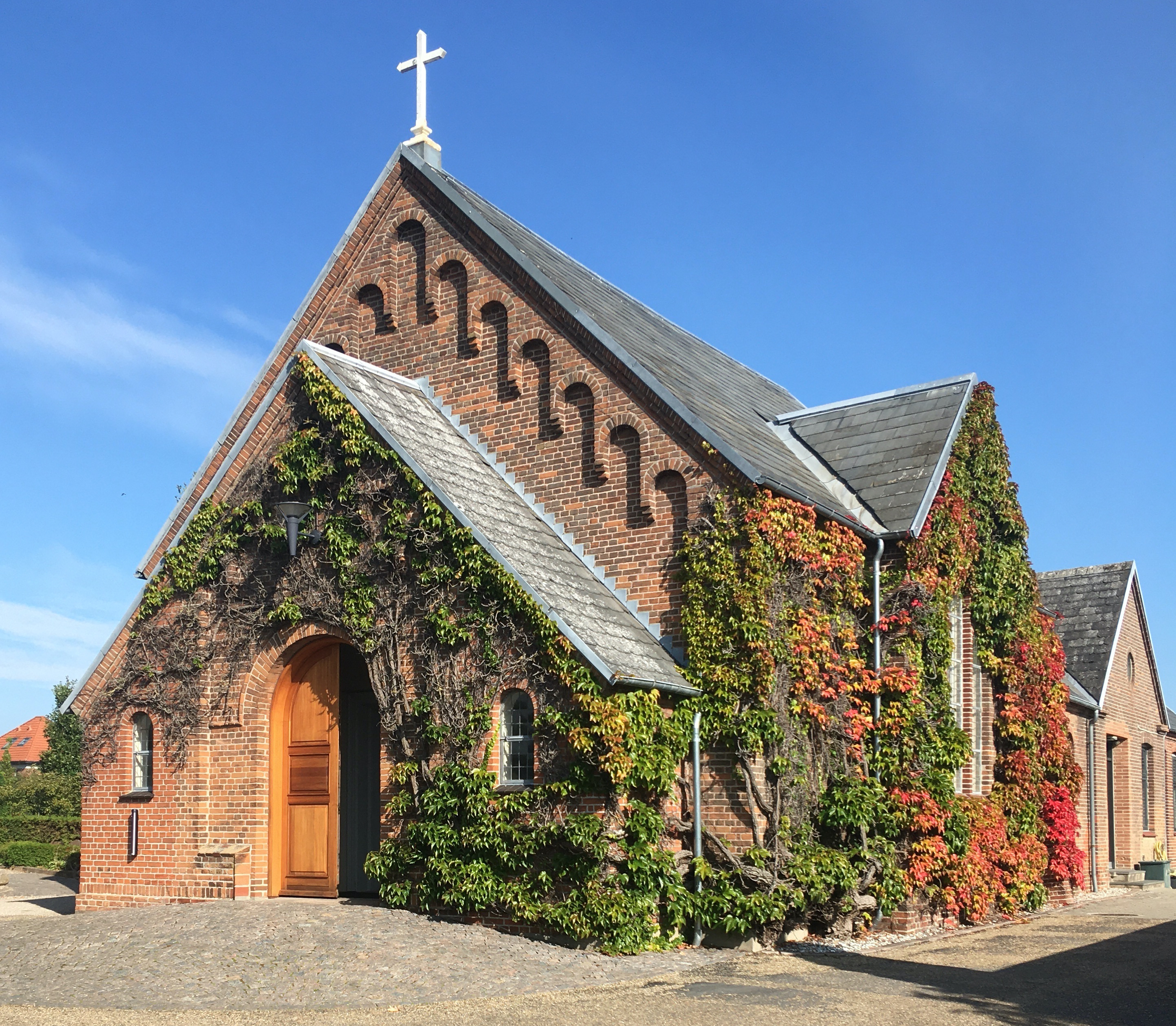
- Nyborg Cemetery Chapel
- 55°18′52.01″N 10°47′35.49″E
- Location: Nyborg, Denmark
- Denomination: Church of Denmark

Administration
- Diocese: Diocese of Funen
- Deanery: Nyborg Provsti
- Parish: Nyborg Parish

Nyborg Cemetery Chapel is located in Nyborg Cemetery in Nyborg.

== Defunct churches ==
=== Stella Maris ===
Stella Maris
- Stella Maris
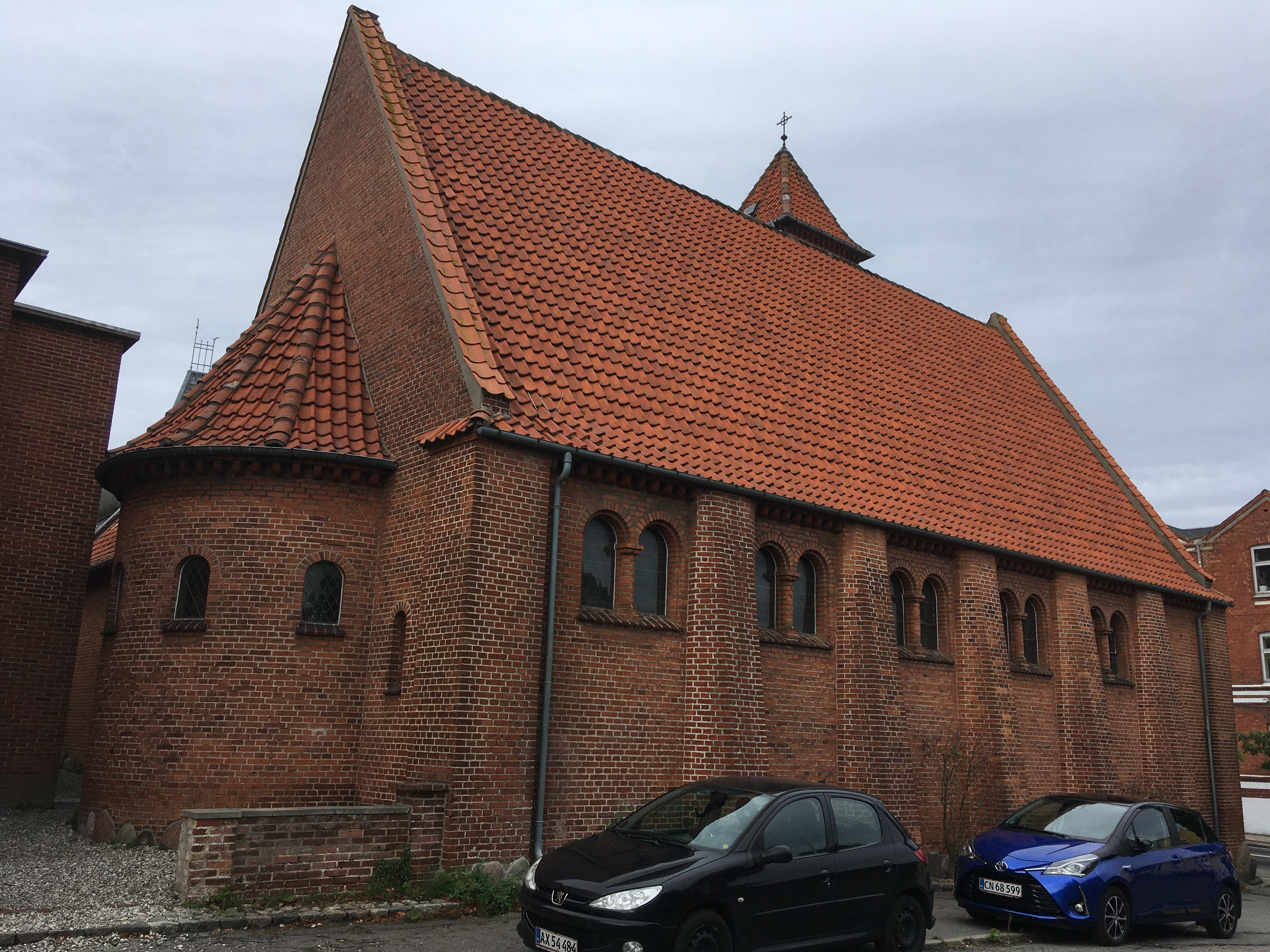
- Stella Maris
- 55°18′32.88″N 10°47′3.3″E
- Location: Nyborg, Denmark
- Denomination: Catholicism

Architecture
- Completed: 1928

Stella Maris is a former Catholic church located in Nyborg. The church is today part of the neighbouring independent school.

Construction of the church began in August 1927 and it was opened on 8 July 1928.
