= Ørbæk =

- Town
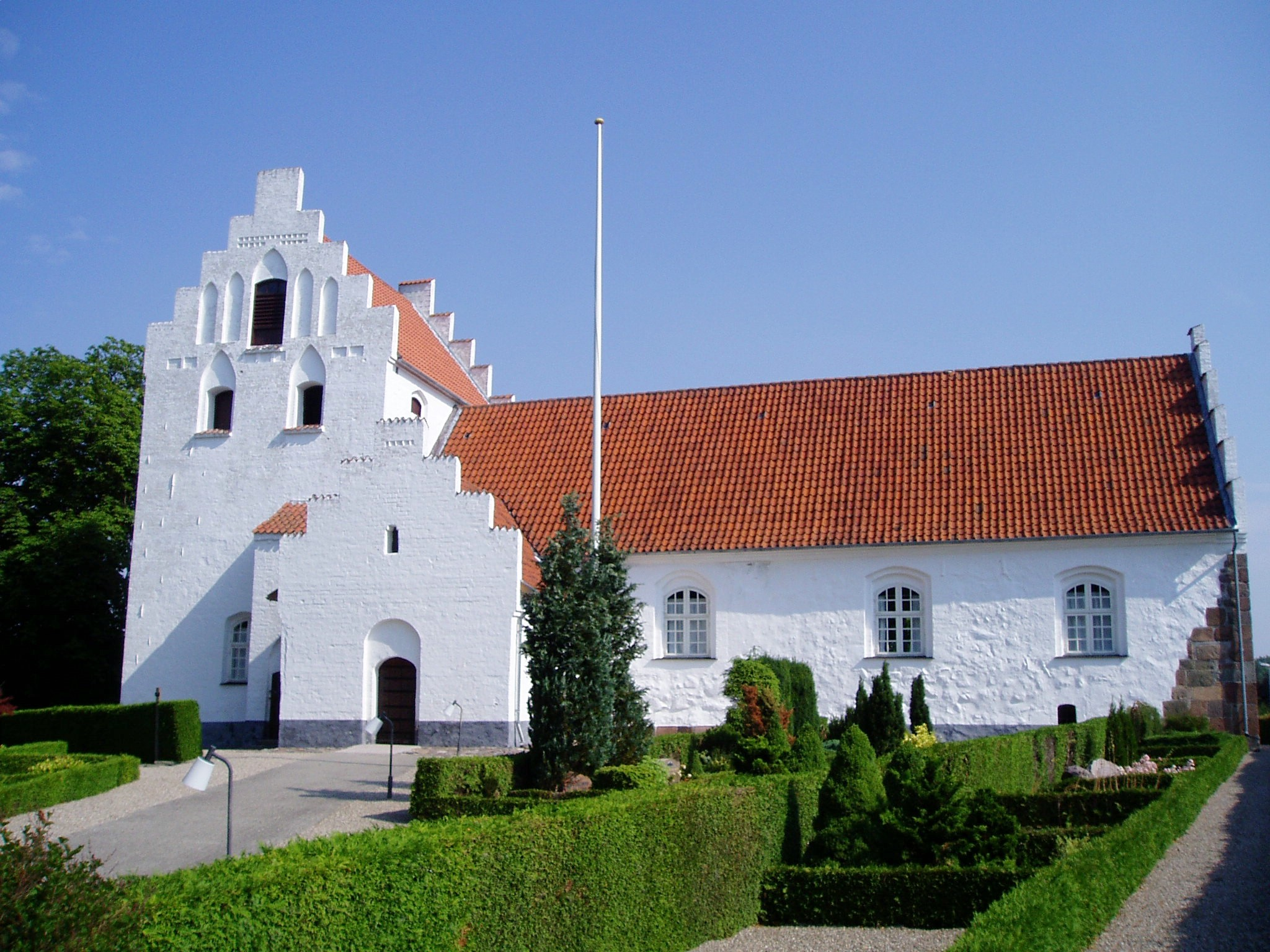
- Ørbæk Church

- Location within Region of Southern Denmark
- Coordinates: 55°15′26″N 10°40′13″E
- Country: Denmark
- Region: Southern Denmark
- Municipality: Nyborg

Area
  - Urban: 1.39 km^{2} (0.54 sq mi)

Population (2026)
  - Urban: 1,747
  - Urban density: 1,260/km^{2} (3,260/sq mi)
- Postal code: DK-5853 Ørbæk

Ørbæk is a town in central Denmark, located in Nyborg municipality on the island of Funen. Ørbæk was until 2007 the seat of Ørbæk Municipality.

== History ==
Ørbæk was first mentioned in 1231 as 'Ørbæc', which was the name of the brook that runs through the town. The town was formerly known as Ør, and the town later adopted the name of the brook. The name was likely changed in the late 1800s.

In the 1800s, Ørbæk was an important village, located centrally with roads directly to Odense, Nyborg, Svendborg, Faaborg and Assens. This central position made it possible for Ørbæk to acquire facilities that other villages of the time didn't have, such as a postal office. With the construction of the Faaborg-Ringe-Nyborg railroad, Ørbæk was a station between Nyborg and Ringe. Ørbæk's history as a railroad station town lasted between 1897 and 1962. After 1962 the railway no longer transported passengers, and in 1969-70 a town hall was built in Ørbæk's old station building.

A smithy was built by the town's priest in 1847. It was acquired by Frilandsmuseet in 1934.

A brewery was built in 1906, where it was a beer brewery until the 1970s. In 1996 the brewery was bought by Niels and Nicolai Rømer and Ørbæk Bryggeri was founded.

== Ørbæk Church ==
Ørbæk Church was built around 1200. The granite baptismal font is as old as the church, with a Dutch baptismal basin from 1625. There are three chandeliers in the church. The oldest of the three is from 1709, donated by priest Christian Michael Luja at his wedding. Another chandelier was donated in 1737 and the last in 1927. A model ship was donated to the church in 1932, but depicts no particular ship. The church has two bells, one from 1778 and one from 1692.

The church was renovated in 1870 and again in the 1950s and from 2016 to 2018.

== Ørbæk Market ==
The yearly Ørbæk Market (Danish: Ørbæk Marked) began around year 1900, where it was mentioned as a market for livestock. The market was helt the 2nd Saturday in July every year until 1957, where the industrialization meant that horses were no longer necessary. The yearly tradition stopped in 1957, but was brought back in 1980. The market was no longer solely for livestock, but now mainly a kræmmermarked - a type of flea market. The market has been held annually since 1980, and is the largest market on Funen.

== Notable residents ==
- Kenneth Muhs (born 1972), politician and mayor of Nyborg Municipality
