= Vindinge, Nyborg =

Vindinge
- Village
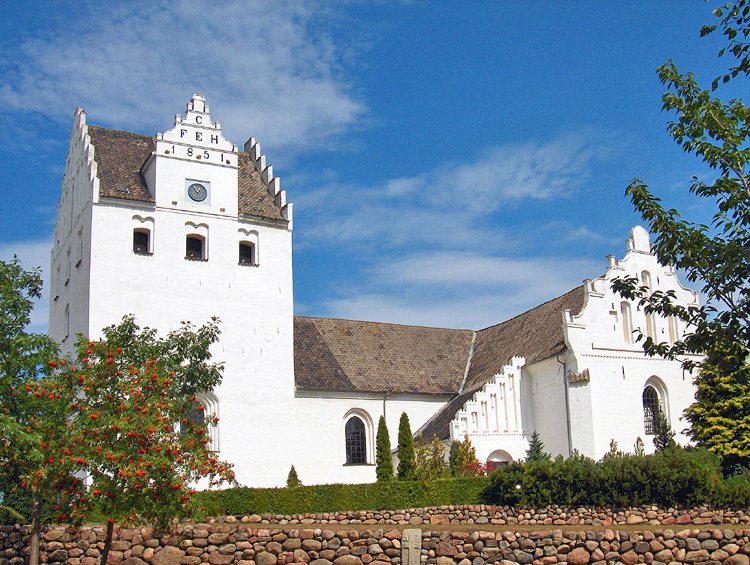
- Vindinge Church

- Location within Region of Southern Denmark
- Coordinates: 55°18′27″N 10°43′48″E
- Country: Denmark
- Region: Southern Denmark
- Municipality: Nyborg

Population (2026)
  - Total: 471

Vindinge is a village in central Denmark, located in Nyborg municipality on the island of Funen in Region of Southern Denmark.

== History ==
Vindinge has existed since the Viking age, where Sweyn Forkbeard visited the city after having been taken captive by the Jomsvikings. Signs of a fortifications and castles have been found in and around Vindinge, which indicates its significance during the Viking age. Gammelborg, from the 500s, was located near Vindinge. Gammelborg was the area's fortification before Nyborg was founded.

Vindinge Church was built in 1181. The altarpiece is from 1480. The church was renovated in 1850, where the former baptismal font disappeared and was replaced by a baptismal font in marble.

Vindinge was the seat of Vindinge Hundred until 1970, where it became a part of Nyborg Municipality.
