= Svendborg County =

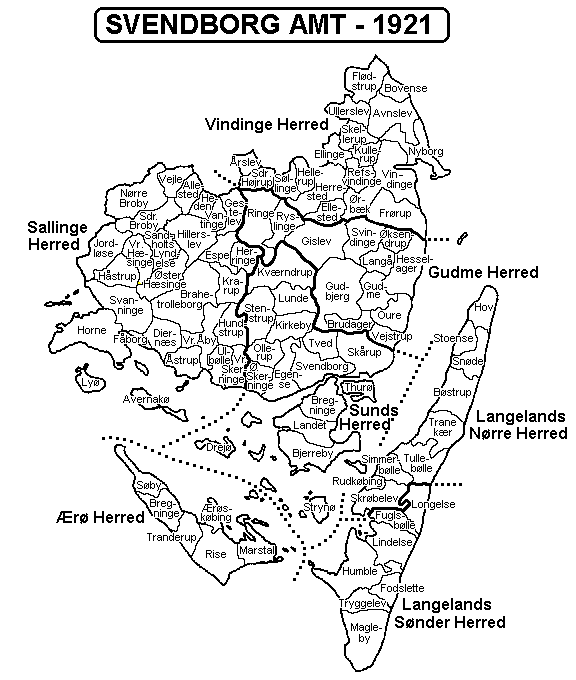
Svendborg County

Svendborg County (Danish: Svendborg Amt) is a former province in Denmark, located on the southern half of the island of Funen in central Denmark. Svendborg County was established in 1793 and abolished in 1970 when it merged with Odense County forming the new Funen County.

The south Funen area was organized as Nyborg County in 1662, a province also including the Hindsholm peninsula. Hindsholm was incorporated into the new Odense County while the bulk of the former province was merged with Tranekær County and renamed to Svendborg County. This situation lasted until 1970 when Odense and Svendborg merged to form Funen County.

Svendborg County featured the market towns (købstæder) of Faaborg, Nyborg, Rudkøbing, Svendborg, and Ærøskøbing. The latter town became part of the province in 1864. In spiritual matters, the county belonged to the Diocese of Funen.

== List of former herreder ==
- Gudme Herred
- Langelands Nørre Herred
- Langelands Sønder Herred
- Sallinge Herred
- Sunds Herred
- Vindinge Herred
- Ærø Herred

Ærø Herred was originally a part of Augustenborg County in the Duchy of Schleswig. Although Schleswig was ceded to Austria and Prussia in 1864 following the Second War of Schleswig, Ærø was allowed to remain Danish and the island incorporated into Svendborg County.

This article incorporates material from the corresponding article on the Danish Wikipedia, accessed January 14, 2007.
