= Odense County =

Coordinates: 55°24′N 10°23′E

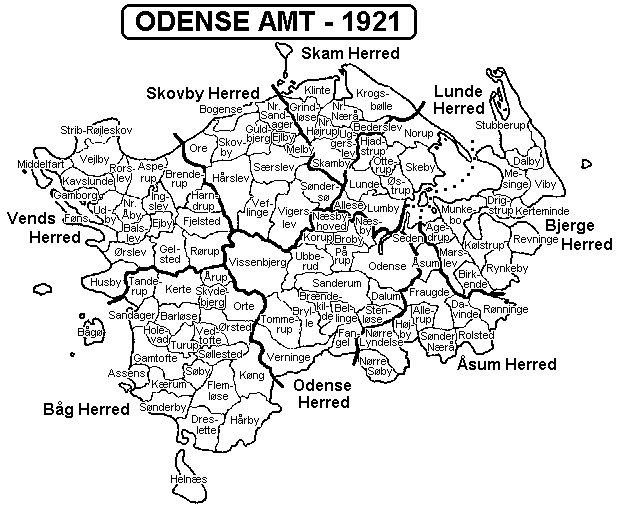
Odense County

Odense County (Danish: Odense Amt) is a former province in Denmark, located on the northern half of the island of Funen in central Denmark. Odense County was established in 1806 and abolished in 1970 when it merged with Svendborg County forming the new Funen County.

In 1662, the north Funen area was organized as a total of four counties: Odensegård, Rugård, Assens, and Hindsgavl. The four counties merged in 1806 forming Odense County, also including the Hindsholm peninsula from the former Nyborg County. This situation lasted from 1806 to 1970 when Odense and Svendborg merged to form Funen County.

Odense County featured the market towns (købstæder) of Assens, Bogense, Kerteminde, Middelfart, and Odense. In spiritual matters, the county belonged to the Diocese of Funen.

== List of former hundreds (herreder) ==
- Bjerge Herred
- Båg Herred
- Lunde Herred
- Odense Herred
- Skam Herred
- Skovby Herred
- Vends Herred
- Åsum Herred
