= Mikkel Bjørn =

Danish politician

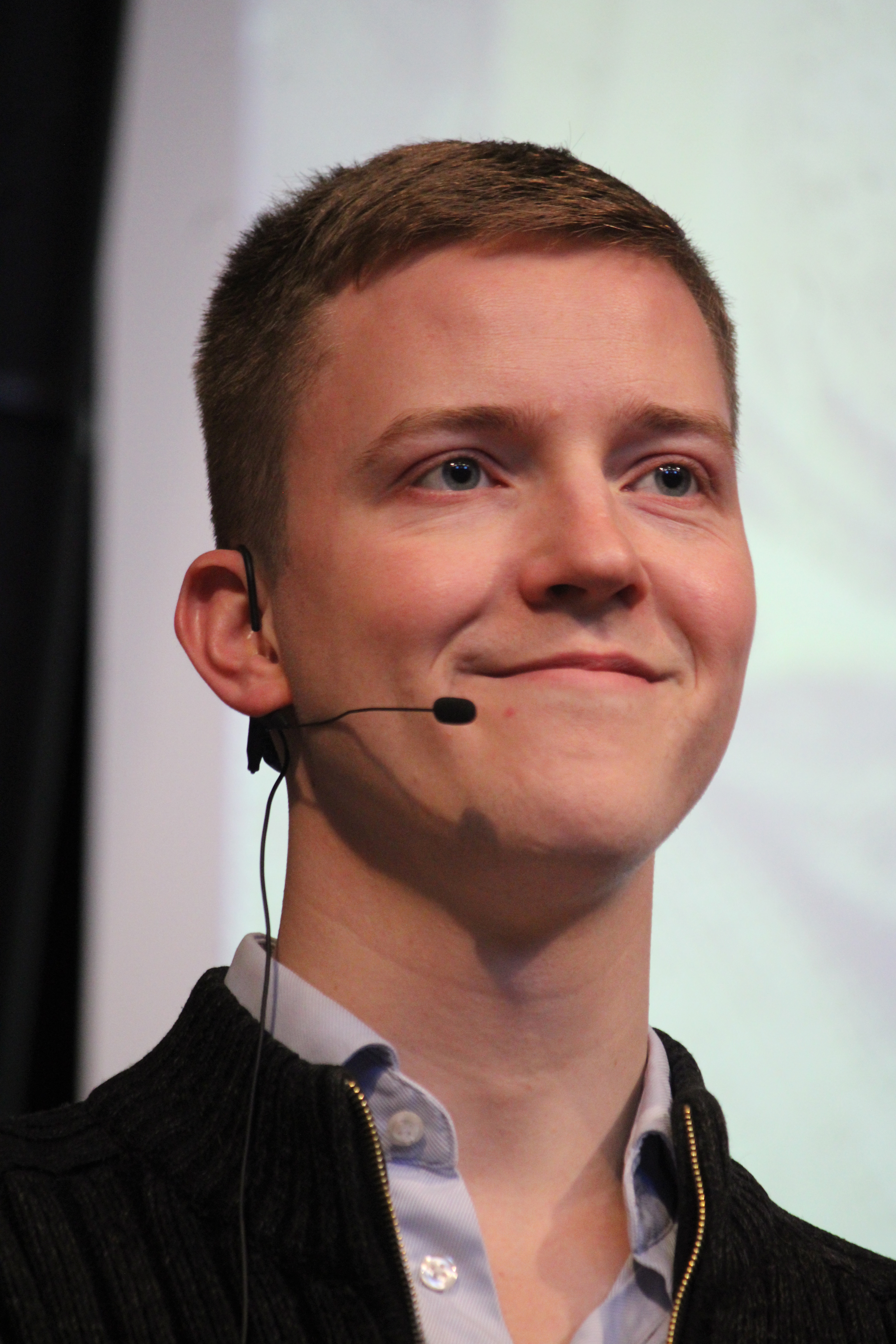
- Bjørn in 2026

Member of the Folketing
- Incumbent
- Assumed office 1 November 2022
- Constituency: Funen

National chairman of Nye Borgerliges Ungdom
- In office 8 October 2016 – 16 October 2021
- Succeeded by: Malte Larsen

Personal details
- Born: 19 October 1995 (age 30) Rårup, Denmark
- Party: Danish People's Party (2023–present)
- Other political affiliations: Young Conservatives (2014–2016); Nye Borgerlige (2016–2023)
- Education: Jelling Seminarium
- Occupation: Politician, teacher
- Website: https://mikkelbjorn.dk

Mikkel Bjørn Sørensen (born 19 October 1995) is a Danish politician and former teacher. In November 2022, he became a member of the Folketing for the Nye Borgerlige (NB) party, but in January 2023 changed his party allegiance to the Danish People's Party (DF). Formerly, in 2016-2021 he was the first national chairman of Nye Borgerlige's youth wing. Growing up near Juelsminde in Jutland, Bjørn has since 2022 lived in Nyborg on Funen.

== Personal life ==
Mikkel Bjørn was born on 19 October 1995 in Rårup, a village in Juelsminde Municipality (now Hedensted Municipality) close to the town of Juelsminde and the city of Horsens, where he went to As Friskole and afterwards received a studentereksamen (high school diploma) in 2014 from Horsens Statsskole. He attended the teacher-training college of Jelling Seminarium from 2016 to 2020 and afterwards worked as a school teacher from 2020 to 2022.

Having previously lived in Jylland, lastly in Randers, in 2023 Bjørn moved to Nyborg on the island of Funen, being situated in the constituency for which he had been elected to Folketinget in 2022.

== Youth politics ==
=== Young Conservatives ===
After gymnasium, in 2014 Mikkel Bjørn joined the Young Conservatives (KU), the youth wing of the Conservative People's Party (DKF), where he became local chairman for KU Vejle. Within the KU, he was considered an affiliate of Hvid Fløj (White Wing), the national conservative fraction in the youth wing.

In 2016 he was expelled from the organisation, allegedly after having indicated in an internal member forum on Facebook that he would vote for another party than the Conservative People's Party at an election, and because of his harsh rhetoric, according to the leader of the Young Conservatives bordering on racism, in various internal debates on immigrants and refugees.

=== Nye Borgerliges Ungdom ===
Bjørn then joined Nye Borgerlige's youth wing named Nye Borgerliges Ungdom (NBU), and in October 2016 he was elected as the first chairman of the organisation. He remained chairman until October 2021, when he was succeeded by Malte Larsen. From 2016 until 2022, he simultaneously held a position in the NB's national committee (hovedbestyrelse).

== Candidate at local and general elections ==
In the 2017 local elections, Bjørn ran for Nye Borgerlige in Vejle Municipality, receiving 33 personal votes without the party winning any seats in the municipality.

At the 2019 general election, the NB's first, in June 2019, Bjørn gained 46 personal votes as a candidate in South Jutland, coming in last among the party's eight candidates in the constituency.

In April 2022, the party national executive appointed Mikkel Bjørn Nye Borgerlige's lead candidate in Funen Greater Constituency for the next general election. The centrally made appointment caused dissatisfaction among some party members in Funen and caused three local politicians to leave the party, accusing the national executive for nepotism. The executive subsequently in August 2022 made a reverse, deciding to arrange a primary voting for the lead candidate position among the party members in Funen, which was subsequently won by Bjørn, receiving 133 votes whereas 212 votes were split between the four competing local candidates.

== Member of Folketing ==
At the general election on 1 November 2022, Bjørn was elected a member of the Folketing with 888 personal votes as one of six MFs for Nye Borgerlige. At the constitution of the NB's parliamentary group in November, he took over the position as group vice-chairman after Mette Thiesen – who had left NB six days after the election – and became, among other things, culture, children's and education spokesman. On 5 January, he took the title of chairman of the Folketing's Naturalisation Committee (Indfødsretsudvalget), the main function of which is deciding who acquires citizenship.

In January 2023, Nye Borgerlige chairman Pernille Vermund announced that she would resign her post as chairman. Most political observers pointed at MP Lars Boje Mathiesen as her most likely successor as party leader, though some thought that Bjørn might also make a bid for the party leadership. The two were seen as representing separate wings in the party, the former Liberal Alliance member Boje Mathiesen representing the liberal wing and Bjørn the national conservative wing.

On 17 January, Boje announced his candidacy for the party leadership position, receiving support from the remaining parliamentary group with the exception of Bjørn (and Vermund, who as outgoing chairman had announced that she would abstain from commenting on the choice of her successor). In the end, no other candidates entered the race for chairman, ensuring Boje's unanimous election as party leader on 7 February.

=== Danish People's Party ===
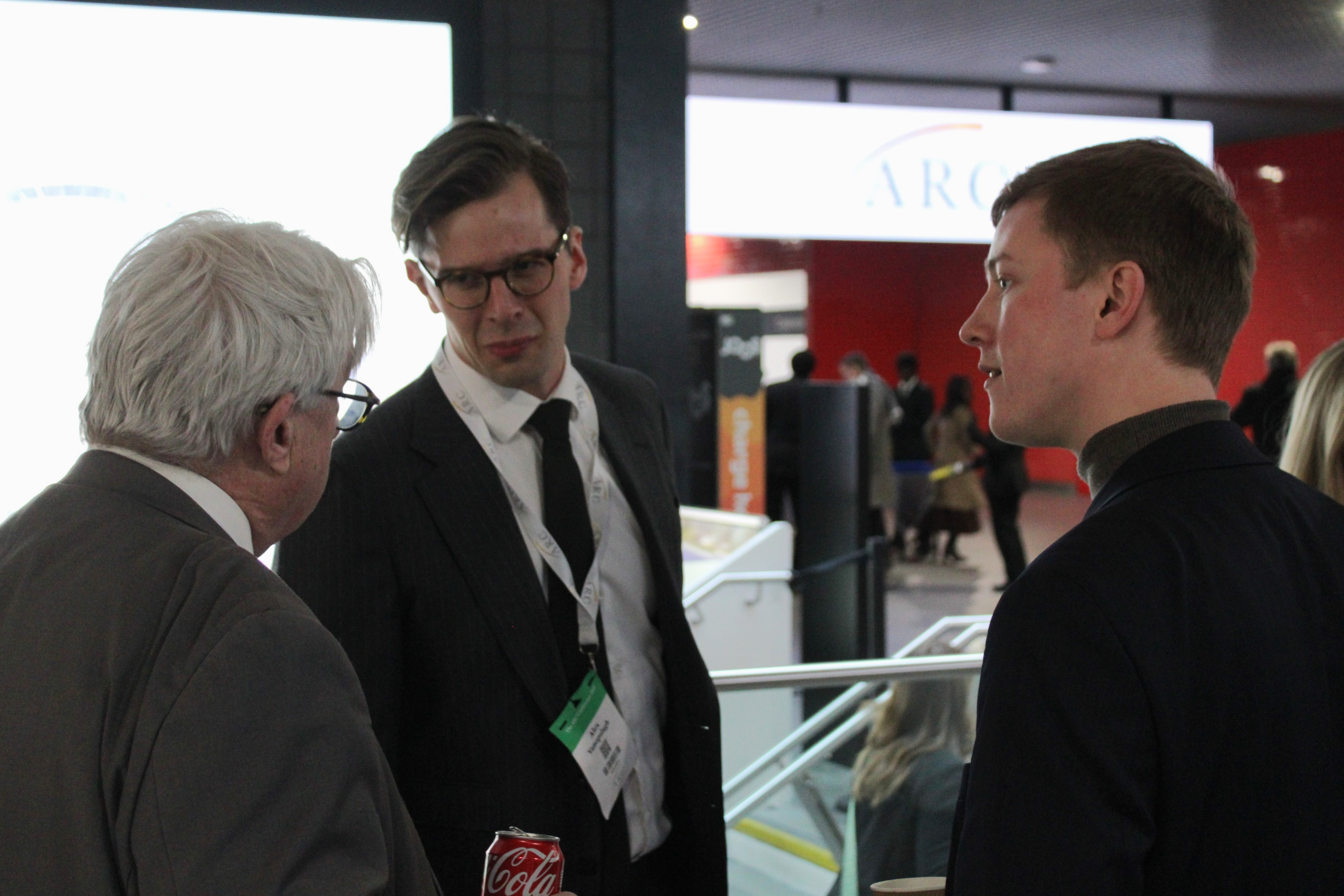
Bjørn with Charles A. Coulombe and Alex Vanopslagh at the Alliance for Responsible Citizenship, London, 2025

On 24 January, Mikkel Bjørn announced that he left Nye Borgerlige and joined the Danish People's Party, citing internal dissension with Boje and a lack of belief in his abilities to lead. Boje retaliated by blaming Bjørn for putting himself before the party, whereas Vermund criticized Bjørn for leaving his post prematurely and taking his seat to another party, having been elected for Nye Borgerlige with the lowest personal number of votes of all the party's parliamentarians.

Three days after his change of party allegiance, Bjørn, continuing as chairman of the Naturalisation Committee, received his first Danish People's Party spokesmanships, which were culture, media, ecclesiastical affairs, gender equality, Nordic cooperation and naturalisation.

== Political positions ==
Mikkel Bjørn is characterised as national conservative. He takes a special interest in cultural and religious matters and is an advocate for Denmark leaving the EU.
