= Nye Borgerliges Ungdom =

Political youth organisation in Denmark

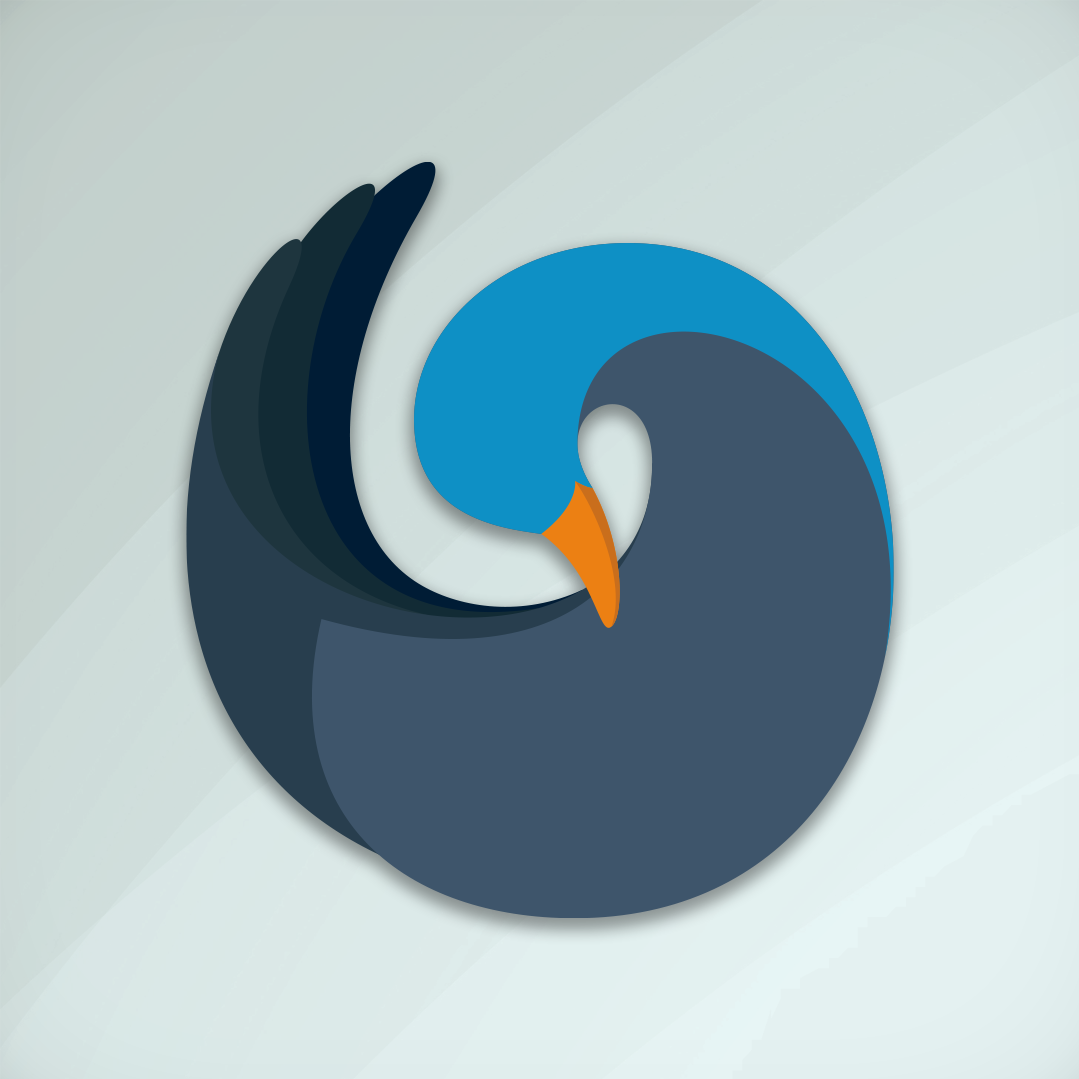
- Founded: 21 November 2015; 10 years ago
- Ideology: National conservatism
- Mother party: Nye Borgerlige
- Website: https://nbung.dk

Nye Borgerliges Ungdom (NBU) is the youth wing of the Danish political party Nye Borgerlige. It was founded in 2015 as "Unge Nye Borgerlige" and changed to its present name the following year.

Nye Borgerliges Ungdom is Nye Borgerlige's official youth organization, which was founded in 2015. In March 2024, the youth party shut down itself in the wake of the dissolution of Nye Borgerlige's parliamentary group, but after the election of Martin Henriksen as chairman of Nye Borgerlige, the youth organization was restored in June 2024 with Joacchim Godtfred Foged Brahtz as new chairman.

== Organisation ==
Nye Borgerliges Ungdom's leading organ was its executive committee (forretningsudvalg), which consists of eight members elected at the youth wing's annual conference. In addition, Nye Borgerliges Ungdom consisted of seven local associations with their own chairmen and boards. These were North Jutland, Mid Jutland, South Jutland, Funen, Zealand, Copenhagen and North Zealand. Members of Nye Borgerliges Ungdom were also members of Nye Borgerlige, and the national chairman of the NBU was a member in Nye Borgerlige's national committee (hovedbestyrelse).

== History ==
The youth wing of Nye Borgerlige was founded in the autumn of 2015 as "Unge Nye Borgerlige". In October 2016, the organisation had its first official national conference, where the name was changed to the present "Nye Borgerliges Ungdom". At the same meeting, the 21-year-old student teacher Mikkel Bjørn Sørensen was elected as the youth wing's first chairman. Bjørn Sørensen was formerly chairman in the local department of Young Conservatives in Vejle, but was expelled from that organisation earlier in 2016. In October 2021, Bjørn was succeeded as youth leader by Malte Larsen.

At the 2021 municipal elections in November, 19-year-old Malte Jäger was elected to the city council of Kerteminde Municipality, thereby becoming the youth wing's first ever elected member.

At the 2022 general election in November, former NBU chairman Mikkel Bjørn was elected a member of the Folketing (MF) as one of NB's altogether six elected parliamentarians. He left the party in January 2023, however, being dissatisfied with the designation of Lars Boje Mathiesen as new party leader of Nye Borgerlige. Bjørn changed his allegiance to the Danish People's Party, and his change of party allegiance was repeated by NBU chairman Malte Larsen and NBU deputy chairman Mitchel Oliver Vestergaard. As a consequence, on 24 February 2023 Tenna Røberg was elected to the resulting vacant position of chairman of Nye Borgerliges Ungdom. After the dissolution of the mother party's parliamentary group in January 2024, NBU got dissolved on 3 March 2024.

== School election results ==
The NBU participated in the so-called school elections in Denmark in 2017, 2019 and 2021, gaining 1.4%, 1.5% and 3.6% of the vote at each of those elections, respectively.

Election	Votes	%	Seats	+/–
2017	635	1.4 (#10)	0 / 179	New
2019	920	1.5 (#10)	0 / 179	▲0.1
2021	1741	3.6 (#9)	7 / 179	▲2.1

== Chairs ==
- 2016–2021 Mikkel Bjørn
- 2021–2023 Malte Larsen
- 2023–2024 Tenna Røberg
