= Hother A. Paludan =

Danish architect (1871-1956)

Hother A. Paludan (9 October 1871 – 2 August 1956) was a Danish architect and civil servant noted for his restoration work on Jutland churches and for his architectural practice in both Aalborg and Copenhagen. Trained at the Technical School and the School of Architecture under Hans Jørgen Holm, he later ran his own studio, taught construction and furniture design, and managed restoration projects at Amalienborg. He also served on the board of the Aalborg Historical Museum, becoming its chairman in 1929.

== Biography ==
Born in Rårup, his parents were the chaplain (later the vicar) Otto Frederik Paludan and Sophie Frederikke Worm. Paludan attended the Technical School in 1891–94. From 1898 until 1904, he studied at the School of Architecture under Hans Jørgen Holm. Paludan was employed by Holm in the refurbishment of estates in Allholm and Vallø in 1894–1902; he was employed by Hack Kampmann in 1902. Paludan received the KA Lars Scholarship in 1902–03 at which time he took a study tour through Europe.

From 1902, Paludan owned a design studio in Copenhagen, moving the business in 1905 to Aalborg, where he stayed until 1932. He taught construction and furniture design at Tech College Aalborg until 1922. During the period of 1933–47, he was again in Copenhagen. From 1932 to 1942, he managed work being done at Amalienborg.

Paludan received many commissions for restoration and rebuilding projects in Jutland churches. He was a member of the Board of Aalborg Historical Museum in 1907–33, Chairman 1929–33. He was made Knight of the Dannebrog in 1929.

On 10 September 1905 in Valløby, he married Elisabeth Rode (1875-1971). He was the father of the administrator Arvid Paludan (1910-2006). Paludan died in Hellerup in 1956 and is buried in Hellerup Cemetery.

== Selected works ==
- Machine housing for waterworks, Blegkilde (1907)
- Thyborøn Church (1908)
- County Hospital, Nibe (1909, extended 1923 by Einar Packness)
- Aalborg Cathedral School, Saxogade (1909–11)
- Aalborg Hospital, Hobrovej (1909–11, later extended)
- Nordjysk Regional Library, Niels Ebbesens Street (1910, relocation and rebuilding of post office)
- Sindal Church (1910)
- Council chamber, Aalborg City Hall (1911)
- Two wings, Aalborg Technical College (1911)
- Godthåb Church (1911–12)
- The center building and north wing, Aalborg Hospital, Urbansgade 36 (1912–16, * extended)
- School in Filskov (1913)
- Nollund Church (1914)
- Tuberculosis Hospital, Skovbakkevej (1915)
- School in Volstrup (1917)
- School in Guldbæk (1917)
- Aalborg Police Headquarters, Rantzausgade (1917–18)
- School in Grindsted by Hammer (1918)
- People's Kitchen, C.W Obel Square (1918, now a café)
- Aalborg Savings Bank, Nytorv (1918)
- Jegindø Church (1918–19)
- North Vanned Church (1919)
- Aalborg Diskontobank (1920–21, demolished)
- Administrative building and public housing, Aalborg Portland and Cement factory Norden, Johannesmindevej (about 1920)
- Archdeacon farm, Queen Christine's Way (1922)
- Nørresundby Bank (1924, with Charles Jensen)
- Klostermark School, Queen Christine's Way (1925)
- Housing, Aalborg Hospital (1925)
- Ansgar's Church, Vesterbro (1927–29)
- St. Joseph's Hospital, Kastetvej (1927–29)
- County Hospital, Hobro (extended 1927–28)
- Arden Church (1935)
- Renovation of Lindenborg Castle (?)

== Gallery ==
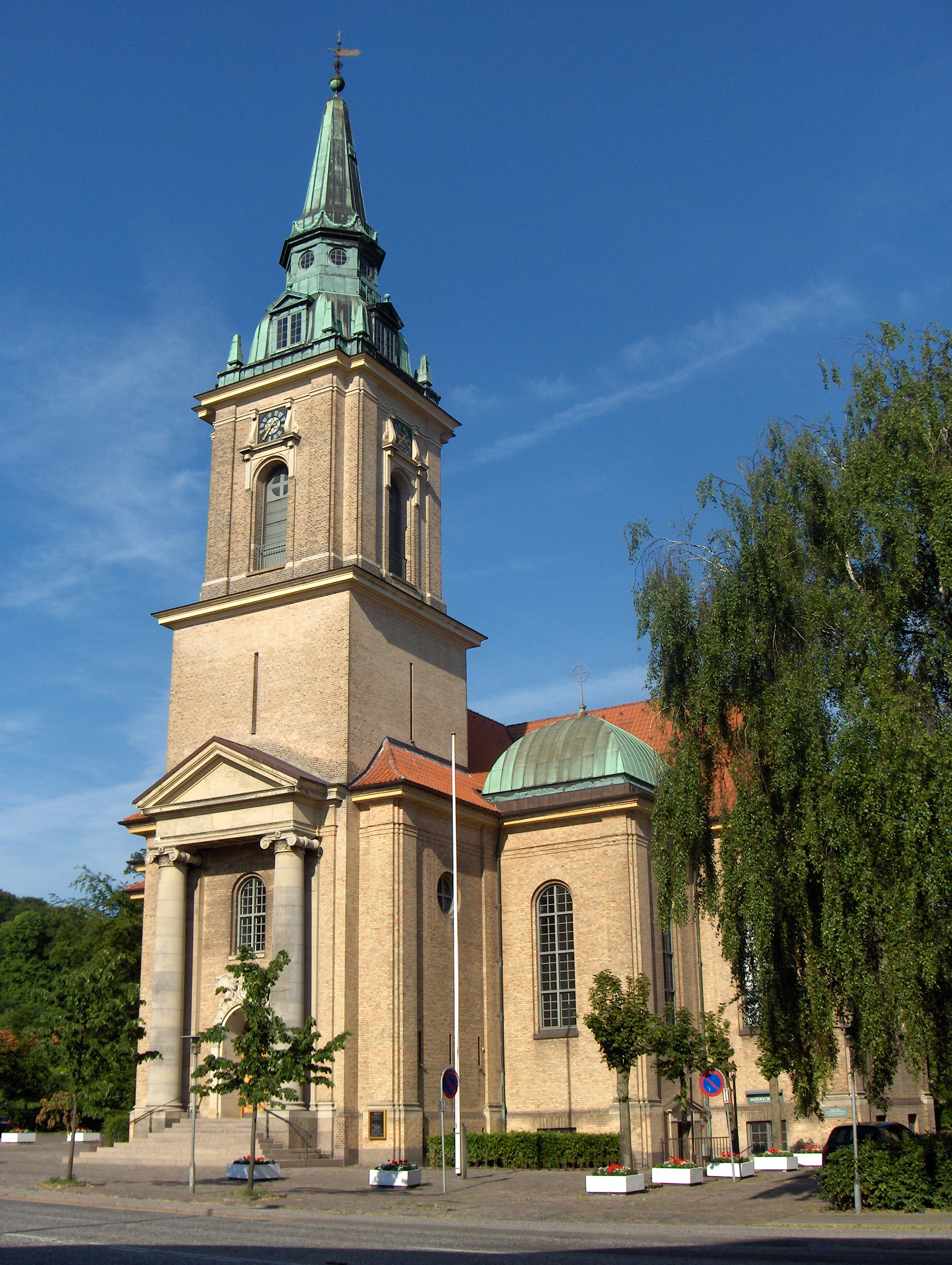
Ansgar Church Aalborg

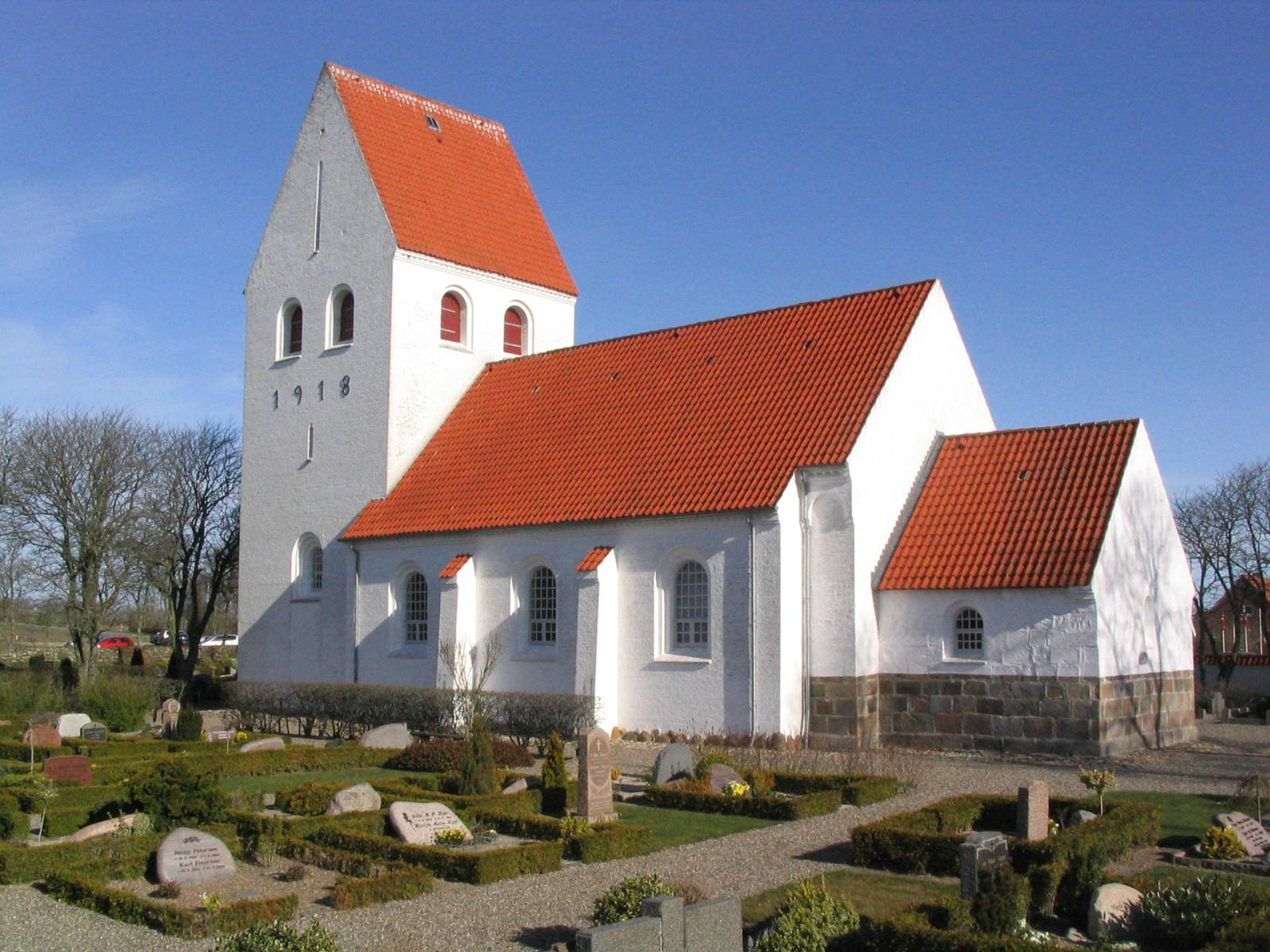
Jegindø Church
