= 2021 Nyborg municipal election =

← 2017	16 November 2021	2025 →

All 25 seats to the Nyborg Municipal Council 13 seats needed for a majority
- Turnout: 19,077 (73.9%) ▼3.8pp
	First party	Second party	Third party
	V	A	F
Party	Venstre	Social Democrats	Green Left
Last election	13 seats, 47.5%	9 seats, 30.4%	1 seat, 4.9%
Seats won	14	8	2
Seat change	▲1	▼1	▲1
Popular vote	9,776	5,157	1,317
Percentage	52.0%	27.4%	7.0%
Swing	▲4.5%	▼3.0%	▲2.1%
	Fourth party	Fifth party
	C	O
Party	Conservatives	Danish People's Party
Last election	0 seats, 1.5%	2 seats, 8.0%
Seats won	1	0
Seat change	▲1	▼2
Popular vote	627	380
Percentage	3.3%	2.0%
Swing	▲1.8%	▼6.0%
Mayor before election
Kenneth Muhs
Venstre
Mayor after election
Kenneth Muhs
Venstre

In 2013, after the parties of the traditional red bloc had won a majority, it was expected that the Social Democrats would win the mayor's position for a second term. However Jan Reimer Christiansen from the party, suddenly switched his party affiliation to Venstre. This resulted in chain reactions that eventually led to Kenneth Muhs from Venstre becoming mayor of Nyborg Municipality.

In the 2017 election, Venstre would win an absolute majority and Kenneth Muhs could continue for a second term.

For this election, once again Venstre would win an absolute majority, and would receive more than 50% of the vote, winning a total of 14 seats. Therefore Kenneth Muhs, who stood for a third term, could once again call himself mayor.

== Electoral system ==
For elections to Danish municipalities, a number varying from 9 to 31 are chosen to be elected to the municipal council. The seats are then allocated using the D'Hondt method and a closed list proportional representation. Nyborg Municipality had 25 seats in 2021

Unlike in Danish General Elections, in elections to municipal councils, electoral alliances are allowed.

== Electoral alliances ==
=== Electoral Alliance 1 ===
Party		Political alignment
A	Social Democrats	Centre-left
B	Social Liberals	Centre to Centre-left
F	Green Left	Centre-left to Left-wing
Ø	Red–Green Alliance	Left-wing to Far-Left

=== Electoral Alliance 2 ===
Party		Political alignment
M	Vi Lokale Demokrater	Local politics
O	Danish People's Party	Right-wing to Far-right
V	Venstre	Centre-right

=== Electoral Alliance 3 ===
Party		Political alignment
C	Conservatives	Centre-right
D	New Right	Right-wing to Far-right
I	Liberal Alliance	Centre-right to Right-wing

== Results by polling station ==
M = Vi Lokale Demokrater

Division	A	B	C	D	F	I	M	O	V	Ø
Division	%	%	%	%	%	%	%	%	%	%
Aunslevhallen	21.4	1.9	3.6	3.7	7.2	0.5	0.9	2.4	54.7	3.7
Nyborghallen	31.1	1.7	2.9	1.6	7.4	0.4	0.6	1.8	48.6	3.9
Bastionen	26.2	2.3	4.2	1.2	9.8	0.6	0.8	1.2	50.3	3.3
Vindinge Forsamlingshus	27.3	1.7	3.2	1.1	7.8	0.6	0.6	1.9	51.9	3.8
Skellerup	36.4	2.0	3.4	3.4	3.1	0.3	1.1	3.9	45.7	0.8
Ellinge	24.2	2.5	5.3	5.6	1.8	0.7	1.1	3.5	51.9	3.5
Ullerslev	35.0	1.0	2.7	2.3	4.9	0.7	1.0	2.7	48.2	1.7
Langå, Svindinge Og Øksendrup	19.0	2.5	4.1	2.5	8.4	0.2	2.0	3.8	51.3	6.1
Langtved	24.2	1.5	2.6	3.8	5.8	0.2	0.4	3.0	55.6	2.8
Ørbæk	17.5	1.2	1.7	2.5	3.3	0.3	0.2	2.8	69.4	1.2
Ellested Og Herrested	22.0	1.6	4.3	2.9	3.8	0.7	0.7	1.6	59.8	2.5
Frørup Og Tårup	28.4	1.8	3.9	2.7	6.0	0.0	0.4	1.8	52.3	2.7
Kullerup Og Refsvindinge	23.3	1.5	3.4	2.5	4.5	0.1	0.4	2.0	59.7	2.5

== Results ==
Party		Votes	%	+/-	Seats	+/-
Nyborg Municipality
V	Venstre	9,776	52.01	+4.55	14	+1
A	Social Democrats	5,157	27.44	-2.98	8	-1
F	Green Left	1,317	7.01	+2.14	2	+1
C	Conservatives	627	3.34	+1.83	1	+1
Ø	Red-Green Alliance	604	3.21	-0.07	0	0
D	New Right	383	2.04	+1.54	0	0
O	Danish People's Party	380	2.02	-5.95	0	-2
B	Social Liberals	335	1.78	+0.59	0	0
M	Vi Lokale Demokrater	135	0.72	New	0	New
I	Liberal Alliance	83	0.44	-0.31	0	0
Total		18,797	100	N/A	25	N/A
Invalid votes		95	0.37	+0.09		
Blank votes		185	0.72	-0.32		
Turnout		19,077	73.87	-3.80		
Source: valg.dk
