= Martin Henriksen =

Martin Henriksen may refer to:

- Martin Henriksen (Danish politician) (born 1980)
- Martin Henriksen (Norwegian politician) (born 1979)

== See also ==
- Martin Henriksson (born 1974), Swedish musician
