= Opinion polling for the 2022 Danish general election =

In the run-up to the 2022 Danish general election, various organisations carried out opinion polling to gauge voting intentions in Denmark. Results of such polls are displayed in this list.

The date range for these opinion polls are from the 2019 Danish general election, held on 5 June, to the present day. The Constitution of Denmark specifies that the next election must be held no later than four years after the previous election. On 5 October 2022, the government called a snap election to be held on 1 November.

== Opinion polls ==
=== 2022 ===
			Parties																Blocs			
Polling firm	Fieldwork date	Sample size	A	V	O	B	F	Ø	C	Å	D	I	K	G	M	Q	Æ	Others	Red	Blue	Lead	
Polling firm	Fieldwork date	Sample size	A	V	O	B	F	Ø	C	Å	D	I	K	G	M	Q	Æ	Others	Red	Blue	All parties	Above 2%
2022 election result		–	27.5	13.3	2.6	3.8	8.3	5.2	5.5	3.3	3.7	7.9	0.5	—	9.3	0.9	8.1	0.1	49.0	41.6	7.4	7.0
Voxmeter	31 Oct 2022	4,577	24.2	14.0	2.9	4.4	9.7	6.5	6.1	3.6	4.1	7.7	0.7	—	8.5	0.7	6.9	0.0	49.1	42.4	6.7	6.7
Gallup	31 Oct 2022	4,483	26.6	13.7	2.9	4.4	8.7	6.3	6.0	3.2	4.3	7.3	0.9	—	8.8	0.3	7.0	–	49.1	42.1	7.0	7.6
Yougov	27–31 Oct 2022	1,336	27.6	12.9	2.8	3.2	8.5	6.3	6.5	1.9	4.3	6.9	0.2	—	8.0	0.9	10.1	–	48.4	43.7	4.7	2.1
Epinion	27 Oct 2022	2,538	24.4	13.3	2.4	4.7	8.7	6.3	5.8	2.3	5.2	8.6	0.4	—	8.3	0.7	8.6	–	47.1	44.3	2.8	2.5
Voxmeter	25–27 Oct 2022	1,001	26.2	12.5	3.0	4.1	9.8	6.0	5.9	2.2	3.7	6.8	0.2	—	10.0	0.8	8.8	0.0	49.1	40.9	8.2	7.6
Yougov	21–25 Oct 2022	1,261	28.6	10.4	2.6	3.6	8.3	6.7	6.5	2.3	4.3	7.1	0.5	—	9.6	0.7	8.5	–	50.2	39.9	10.3	10.1
Gallup	24 Oct 2022	1,928	24.4	13.8	2.3	3.7	9.2	8.0	6.2	2.5	3.8	8.3	0.4	—	8.8	0.4	8.1	–	48.2	42.9	5.3	5.3
Voxmeter	22–24 Oct 2022	1,004	25.0	13.2	1.9	3.8	9.6	6.5	6.0	1.7	4.2	7.3	0.6	—	11.5	0.6	8.1	0.0	47.2	41.3	5.9	6.1
Voxmeter	19–21 Oct 2022	942	25.7	14.2	2.4	4.7	9.1	6.8	6.7	2.2	3.8	7.5	0.5	—	8.8	0.5	6.8	0.3	49.0	41.9	7.1	7.1
Epinion	20 Oct 2022	2,568	24.3	12.7	2.4	4.3	8.0	7.1	7.0	2.2	4.9	7.0	0.6	—	9.8	0.8	8.6	–	46.7	43.2	3.5	3.3
Gallup	18 Oct 2022	1,989	27.7	14.5	2.7	4.5	8.9	6.9	7.1	1.5	4.8	6.7	0.7	—	7.3	0.7	5.9	–	50.2	42.4	7.8	6.3
Voxmeter	16–18 Oct 2022	1,008	25.0	14.7	1.8	5.3	9.1	7.4	7.7	1.6	3.9	5.7	0.6	—	9.2	0.5	7.4	0.1	48.9	41.8	7.1	7.4
Yougov	15–18 Oct 2022	1,343	30.3	10.6	2.8	3.1	7.2	5.3	8.0	2.3	5.1	6.8	0.5	—	7.9	1.6	8.3	–	49.8	42.1	7.7	6.6
Voxmeter	13–15 Oct 2022	1,019	26.1	14.4	2.6	4.8	8.7	6.6	8.9	1.9	4.5	6.1	0.9	—	6.1	0.4	7.9	0.1	48.5	45.3	3.2	1.8
Epinion	13 Oct 2022	2,645	25.9	12.9	2.3	4.9	8.3	6.5	8.6	2.4	5.9	5.8	0.4	—	6.9	0.7	8.0	–	48.7	43.9	4.8	4.5
Gallup	12 Oct 2022	1,995	27.4	12.9	3.1	5.1	8.5	6.1	9.9	1.6	4.5	5.5	1.4	—	5.5	0.5	8.0	–	49.2	45.3	3.9	3.2
Voxmeter	10–12 Oct 2022	1,019	27.5	14.3	2.4	4.2	7.9	7.2	8.9	2.4	3.9	5.0	0.7	—	6.1	0.8	8.7	0.0	50.0	43.9	6.1	6.0
Yougov	11 Oct 2022	1,271	30.6	10.5	3.4	4.3	8.1	5.1	10.4	1.7	4.4	5.5	0.1	—	4.4	0.6	10.6	–	50.4	44.9	5.5	3.3
Voxmeter	7–9 Oct 2022	1,015	27.1	13.8	2.3	5.0	8.7	6.7	9.8	2.0	4.9	5.3	0.6	—	4.1	0.6	9.0	0.1	50.1	45.7	4.4	4.4
Yougov	7 Oct 2022	1,010	29.3	9.5	2.9	3.5	8.0	8.2	10.8	1.0	5.3	4.4	0.1	—	5.2	0.6	11.2	–	50.6	44.1	6.5	4.9
Gallup	6 Oct 2022	1,726	26.7	13.2	2.1	3.8	8.9	6.6	11.2	1.6	3.6	4.4	0.5	—	6.1	0.5	10.7	–	48.1	45.7	2.4	0.8
Voxmeter	3–6 Oct 2022	1,094	27.5	14.6	1.7	5.4	8.3	7.1	11.4	1.2	4.7	5.6	0.8	—	3.3	0.3	7.9	0.1	49.8	46.7	3.1	4.1
Epinion	5 Oct 2022	1,911	27.3	12.7	1.8	4.9	8.1	6.7	11.2	1.3	6.3	4.1	0.4	—	3.7	0.7	10.3	–	49.0	46.8	2.2	2.4
Gallup	2 Oct 2022	1,607	24.4	11.9	1.9	6.8	7.9	8.7	12.3	1.2	6.0	4.0	1.3	—	3.4	0.3	9.8	–	49.3	47.2	2.1	3.8
Voxmeter	26 Sep–2 Oct 2022	1,001	25.3	15.5	3.3	6.0	8.8	8.0	11.0	1.5	4.7	4.2	0.7	—	2.2	0.4	8.4	0.1	50.0	47.8	2.2	1.0
Voxmeter	19–25 Sep 2022	1,004	25.1	14.1	2.5	6.5	8.3	7.3	11.6	1.1	5.1	4.6	1.2	0.3	2.4	0.6	9.1	0.2	49.2	48.2	1.0	0.2
Epinion	13–20 Sep 2022	2,270	25.4	11.9	1.9	4.6	7.6	8.1	13.4	0.9	4.6	5.3	0.3	0.3	3.3	1.0	10.8	0.6	47.9	48.2	0.3	0.3
Voxmeter	12–18 Sep 2022	1,001	24.2	13.9	2.1	6.3	8.4	8.3	13.6	0.8	4.8	4.3	1.3	0.3	1.8	0.4	9.3	0.2	48.7	49.3	0.6	0.8
Voxmeter	5–11 Sep 2022	1,003	23.3	13.8	2.9	6.0	9.1	7.7	15.1	1.4	4.9	3.6	0.5	0.1	2.1	0.5	9.0	0.0	48.1	49.8	1.7	3.2
Voxmeter	29 Aug–4 Sep 2022	1,002	24.7	12.5	3.3	6.4	8.0	7.2	16.2	1.6	4.3	3.4	1.0	0.1	1.7	0.3	9.3	0.1	48.3	50.0	1.7	2.7
Gallup	2 Sep 2022	≈1,000	23.1	12.2	2.4	6.4	8.8	8.3	14.1	0.5	4.2	3.5	1.4	0.4	3.3	0.7	10.2	–	48.2	48.0	0.2	0.0
Voxmeter	22–28 Aug 2022	1,001	25.2	11.8	3.4	5.7	7.8	8.1	16.4	1.4	3.7	4.0	0.4	0.2	2.3	0.4	8.9	0.3	48.8	48.6	0.2	1.4
Epinion	16–24 Aug 2022	1,068	23.3	11.3	2.2	5.5	8.7	7.3	16.7	1.1	4.1	3.1	0.7	0.3	2.8	0.5	11.8	–	46.7	49.9	3.2	4.4
Voxmeter	15–21 Aug 2022	1,068	25.1	11.0	3.2	5.6	7.6	7.5	16.5	1.2	4.3	4.9	0.6	0.3	1.9	0.5	9.3	0.5	47.8	49.8	2.0	3.4
Voxmeter	8–14 Aug 2022	1,051	23.9	13.4	2.5	6.3	8.5	8.1	13.3	0.5	5.8	4.3	1.0	0.1	2.2	0.2	9.7	0.2	47.6	50.0	2.4	2.2
Yougov	7 Aug 2022	1,242	26.1	10.0	3.1	5.2	7.2	6.9	13.9	1.0	5.2	3.2	0.3	0.8	4.6	0.6	11.9	–	47.8	47.6	0.2	1.9
Voxmeter	1–6 Aug 2022	1,001	22.9	15.2	2.8	7.2	8.3	7.4	12.5	1.2	4.7	3.2	0.4	0.2	1.9	0.3	11.2	0.6	47.5	50.0	2.5	3.8
Gallup	5 Aug 2022	1,577	23.5	13.2	1.8	6.9	9.3	6.1	11.8	0.3	6.0	4.1	1.7	0.2	4.1	0.3	10.2	–	46.6	48.8	2.2	0.5
Epinion	21–28 Jul 2022	1833	24.2	14.2	2.1	5.8	8.1	7.3	11.5	1.3	4.4	3.8	1.0	0.4	3.1	0.8	10.8	0.7	47.9	47.8	0.1	1.4
Voxmeter	27 Jun–3 Jul 2022	1,003	25.8	13.6	2.2	6.9	9.1	7.6	12.3	1.5	4.3	3.0	0.8	0.0	2.2	0.8	—	10.1	51.5	38.4	13.1	14.0
Voxmeter	20–26 Jun 2022	1,002	26.3	15.2	4.3	7.5	8.3	7.9	13.0	1.4	5.8	3.2	0.3	0.5	2.1	0.6	—	3.6	52.5	43.9	8.6	8.5
Voxmeter	13–19 Jun 2022	1,049	26.5	17.4	4.2	6.5	8.0	7.5	14.2	0.7	6.2	3.8	0.7	0.0	3.1	0.8	—	0.4	50.0	49.6	0.4	2.7
Gallup	14 Jun 2022	1,544	25.4	14.6	5.3	6.3	9.8	7.8	13.8	1.0	6.1	3.6	1.4	0.3	3.6	0.5	—	0.5	51.1	48.4	2.7	5.9
Voxmeter	6–12 Jun 2022	1,032	26.4	17.7	5.6	7.1	8.6	6.5	12.9	1.2	5.3	3.5	0.7	0.1	3.7	0.3	—	0.4	50.2	49.4	0.8	3.6
Voxmeter	30 May–5 Jun 2022	1,002	26.3	17.2	4.9	7.2	9.4	7.3	13.6	0.8	5.8	4.4	0.9	0.0	1.5	0.3	—	0.4	51.3	46.8	4.5	4.3
Voxmeter	23–29 May 2022	1,001	24.9	16.1	4.0	7.1	9.5	7.7	14.9	1.3	6.9	3.6	0.7	0.2	1.4	0.7	—	1.0	51.4	46.2	5.2	3.7
Epinion	22–29 May 2022	2,096	27.2	15.7	5.3	6.1	8.4	6.5	13.0	1.0	7.0	3.9	0.6	0.5	1.9	1.6	—	1.3	51.3	45.5	5.8	3.3
Voxmeter	16–22 May 2022	1,003	25.6	17.2	4.3	7.3	8.9	8.3	13.3	1.0	7.0	3.8	1.5	0.0	1.5	0.3	—	0.2	51.2	48.6	3.4	4.5
Epinion	11–18 May 2022	1,973	25.5	15.9	5.2	6.5	7.7	6.9	14.2	1.5	6.8	4.1	0.9	0.4	2.4	0.8	—	–	49.3	49.5	0.2	0.4
Voxmeter	9–15 May 2022	1,028	26.2	16.3	5.1	7.6	7.9	8.7	14.2	0.8	5.8	3.1	1.3	0.2	1.9	0.6	—	0.3	51.7	47.7	4.0	5.9
Voxmeter	2–8 May 2022	1,021	27.4	16.4	5.7	6.5	7.7	8.0	14.5	0.6	4.9	3.4	1.7	0.1	2.1	0.5	—	0.6	50.8	48.7	3.1	4.7
Gallup	29 Apr–5 May 2022	1,415	25.7	15.1	5.5	6.3	9.0	8.0	15.2	0.9	5.3	3.2	1.7	0.3	3.0	0.7	—	0.1	50.9	49.0	1.9	4.7
Voxmeter	25 Apr–1 May 2022	1,067	28.9	15.6	4.4	7.1	7.9	7.7	13.9	1.0	5.3	4.0	0.9	0.1	2.1	0.2	—	0.9	52.9	46.2	6.3	8.4
Epinion	20–27 Apr 2022	1,676	27.7	12.3	5.0	6.5	8.4	6.9	14.9	1.2	6.7	3.8	2.4	0.6	2.4	0.6	—	–	51.9	47.5	4.4	4.4
Voxmeter	18–24 Apr 2022	1,002	27.9	15.6	5.2	8.2	8.6	7.2	13.8	1.2	5.7	3.1	1.3	0.0	1.4	0.4	—	0.4	53.5	46.1	7.4	8.5
YouGov	8–11 Apr 2022	1,241	29.2	11.1	4.5	3.2	8.1	6.3	17.2	0.5	9.4	3.1	1.1	0.8	4.8	1.0	—	–	48.8	46.4	2.4	1.5
Voxmeter	4–9 Apr 2022	1,001	26.0	16.2	6.1	7.5	9.0	7.5	13.5	1.3	6.1	2.4	1.3	0.1	2.2	0.2	—	0.6	51.6	47.8	3.8	5.7
Voxmeter	28 Mar–3 Apr 2022	1,007	26.0	15.4	5.7	6.7	9.4	7.6	14.5	1.2	5.5	2.9	1.6	0.1	2.3	0.5	—	0.6	51.5	47.9	3.6	5.7
Gallup	4 Apr 2022	≈1,500	26.7	13.4	4.9	6.2	8.5	7.6	15.4	0.5	6.7	3.0	1.6	0.4	3.6	0.9	—	0.6	50.8	48.6	2.2	5.6
Voxmeter	21–27 Mar 2022	1,005	27.6	14.3	5.2	6.8	8.6	8.8	15.2	0.8	4.6	2.2	1.2	0.1	3.2	0.5	—	0.9	53.2	45.9	7.3	10.3
Voxmeter	14–20 Mar 2022	1,003	26.5	15.1	4.4	7.4	9.5	8.5	15.9	0.7	5.1	2.6	1.3	0.1	1.8	0.2	—	0.9	52.9	46.2	6.7	8.8
Epinion	8–15 Mar 2022	2,024	28.0	15.3	5.0	6.5	8.0	6.8	14.3	1.4	7.1	2.6	1.2	0.5	1.9	0.7	—	–	51.9	47.4	4.5	5.0
YouGov	4–7 Mar 2022	1,248	30.5	8.7	5.0	5.5	7.1	7.9	16.7	0.6	9.1	2.4	0.9	0.6	4.8	0.3	—	–	52.5	47.6	4.9	9.1
Voxmeter	7–12 Mar 2022	1,007	27.0	14.0	5.3	6.6	8.9	7.6	15.1	1.7	5.7	3.0	1.3	0.3	2.2	0.0	—	1.3	52.1	46.6	5.5	7.0
Voxmeter	21–27 Feb 2022	1,004	26.5	14.5	4.3	7.7	8.2	8.9	16.8	1.3	5.6	3.1	0.9	0.0	–	0.3	—	1.9	52.9	45.2	7.7	7.0
Voxmeter	14–20 Feb 2022	1,007	25.2	15.0	6.1	7.3	8.7	9.4	16.0	1.5	4.7	3.5	1.1	0.0	–	0.0	—	1.5	52.1	46.4	5.7	5.3
Epinion	9–16 Feb 2022	2,081	24.8	13.0	6.3	6.8	8.2	7.8	16.8	0.6	8.2	2.5	1.5	0.4	–	0.9	—	2.2	49.5	48.3	1.2	0.8
Voxmeter	7–12 Feb 2022	1,003	24.9	14.1	5.6	6.9	8.9	9.5	16.6	1.4	5.0	3.1	1.5	0.0	–	0.2	—	2.4	51.7	45.9	5.8	5.8
YouGov	4–6 Feb 2022	1,245	28.2	9.6	5.3	5.0	7.9	6.8	17.4	0.8	9.5	2.4	1.0	1.4	4.5	0.3	—	–	49.0	49.7	0.2	3.7
Voxmeter	31 Jan–6 Feb 2022	1,024	24.0	14.8	6.2	7.2	9.2	9.1	16.1	0.9	5.4	2.8	1.8	0.2	–	0.2	—	2.1	50.8	47.1	3.7	4.2
Gallup	26 Jan–3 Feb 2022	1,652	27.5	13.8	6.0	5.8	8.1	9.8	15.3	0.6	5.6	2.1	1.5	0.1	2.5	0.5	—	0.8	52.4	46.8	6.4	8.4
Voxmeter	24–30 Jan 2022	1,015	24.9	14.2	7.1	7.7	8.6	8.3	16.4	0.9	6.0	2.1	1.7	0.0	–	0.0	—	2.1	50.4	47.5	2.9	3.7
Voxmeter	17–23 Jan 2022	1,008	26.8	14.4	5.5	6.9	8.0	9.4	15.5	0.8	6.8	2.9	1.2	0.0	–	0.1	—	1.7	52.0	46.3	5.7	6.0
Voxmeter	10–16 Jan 2022	1,003	25.8	15.1	5.3	7.5	8.5	9.3	14.6	1.1	5.9	3.3	1.4	0.0	–	0.3	—	1.9	52.5	45.6	6.9	6.9
YouGov	7–10 Jan 2022	1,256	28.6	11.0	6.5	5.7	6.9	7.8	17.8	0.5	8.2	2.6	1.2	0.5	2.4	0.5	—	–	49.9	49.6	0.3	2.9
Voxmeter	3–8 Jan 2022	1,002	25.1	16.5	6.2	7.2	8.6	8.9	15.0	1.2	6.0	2.5	1.8	0.0	–	0.1	—	0.9	51.1	48.0	3.1	3.6
2019 election	5 Jun 2019	–	25.9	23.4	8.7	8.6	7.7	6.9	6.6	3.0	2.4	2.3	1.7	–	–	–	–	0.0	52.1	47.8	4.3	8.7

=== 2021 ===
			Parties																	Blocs			
Polling firm	Fieldwork date	Sample size	A	V	O	B	F	Ø	C	Å	D	I	P	K	E	G	M	Q	Others	Red	Blue	Lead	
Polling firm	Fieldwork date	Sample size	A	V	O	B	F	Ø	C	Å	D	I	P	K	E	G	M	Q	Others	Red	Blue	All parties	Above 2%
Voxmeter	20–23 Dec 2021	1,013	26.3	15.2	6.9	6.5	8.6	9.1	14.5	1.3	6.4	2.6	—	1.6	—	0.0	–	0.2	0.8	52.0	47.2	4.8	4.9
Voxmeter	13–19 Dec 2021	1,000	25.9	15.4	6.9	7.0	8.8	10.0	15.5	0.8	5.5	1.9	—	1.5	—	0.1	–	0.0	0.7	52.6	46.7	6.1	8.4
Voxmeter	6–11 Dec 2021	1,150	24.3	15.8	6.3	6.0	9.1	9.6	16.3	1.4	5.6	2.5	—	2.1	—	0.1	–	0.1	0.8	50.6	48.6	2.0	0.4
Gallup	3–9 Dec 2021	1,619	26.7	15.2	5.3	5.4	7.3	9.4	16.4	0.6	6.0	3.6	—	1.7	—	0.2	1.7	0.2	0.3	49.8	48.2	1.6	2.3
Epinion	30 Nov–8 Dec 2021	1,717	26.3	14.6	4.8	6.5	8.9	7.8	16.0	0.8	7.5	2.8	—	1.9	—	0.3	–	0.6	–	51.2	47.6	3.6	3.8
Voxmeter	29 Nov–5 Dec 2021	1,003	25.7	16.4	6.6	6.4	8.4	10.3	15.1	1.1	4.9	2.4	—	1.6	—	0.0	–	0.0	1.1	51.9	47.0	4.9	5.4
Voxmeter	22–28 Nov 2021	1,005	26.0	17.0	6.2	5.7	7.9	9.7	15.1	0.9	5.5	3.2	—	1.1	—	0.2	–	0.4	1.1	50.8	48.1	2.7	2.3
Voxmeter	15–21 Nov 2021	1,250	25.8	17.5	5.8	5.2	8.4	8.7	14.7	1.5	6.3	3.0	—	1.7	—	0.1	–	0.0	1.3	49.7	49.0	0.7	0.8
Local elections	16 Nov 2021	3,088,128	28.5	21.2	4.1	5.6	7.6	7.3	15.2	0.7	3.6	1.4	–	0.8	–	0.2	–	–	3.6	49.7	46.3	3.4	4.9
Voxmeter	8–14 Nov 2021	1,593	26.5	16.3	6.4	5.3	7.8	8.9	14.3	1.1	5.7	3.5	—	1.7	—	0.1	–	0.2	2.2	49.9	47.9	2.0	2.3
Voxmeter	1–6 Nov 2021	1,006	26.4	15.2	6.2	5.4	8.1	8.0	15.1	0.7	7.0	3.7	—	1.7	—	0.0	–	—	2.6	48.6	48.9	0.3	0.7
Gallup	29 Oct–4 Nov 2021	1,589	26.6	16.1	6.7	5.7	8.2	8.5	15.0	0.8	6.7	2.5	—	1.5	—	0.0	1.6	—	0.5	49.9	48.0	1.9	2.6
Voxmeter	25–31 Oct 2021	1,001	26.8	14.6	6.4	5.9	7.2	8.6	15.0	0.6	7.1	3.3	—	1.4	—	0.0	–	—	3.1	49.1	47.8	1.3	2.1
Voxmeter	18–24 Oct 2021	1,003	27.1	14.3	6.9	5.3	7.8	8.1	13.9	0.6	6.6	4.2	—	1.2	—	0.4	–	—	3.6	49.3	47.1	2.2	2.4
Epinion	14–21 Oct 2021	1,634	28.0	15.9	5.9	6.0	8.0	8.0	13.5	1.4	5.8	2.9	—	1.5	—	0.7	–	—	2.4	52.1	45.5	6.6	6.0
Voxmeter	11–17 Oct 2021	1,103	27.7	13.3	6.5	5.7	8.4	8.8	12.8	0.6	7.1	4.0	—	1.3	—	0.1	–	—	3.7	51.3	45.0	6.3	6.9
Voxmeter	4–11 Oct 2021	1,013	28.7	14.5	6.0	5.3	7.6	8.3	13.8	0.6	7.6	3.2	—	1.4	—	0.0	–	—	2.0	51.3	46.7	4.6	4.8
Gallup	3 Oct 2021	1,662	27.3	13.2	6.9	6.1	8.3	8.7	14.3	0.6	5.6	1.9	—	2.5	—	0.1	3.5	—	–	51.1	44.4	6.7	7.9
Voxmeter	27 Sep–3 Oct 2021	1,003	27.6	14.9	5.6	4.6	8.9	9.0	14.5	0.5	6.6	2.9	—	1.6	—	0.1	–	—	3.2	50.7	46.1	4.6	5.6
Epinion	21–29 Sep 2021	1,551	27.6	14.4	6.2	5.6	9.2	7.8	14.5	1.0	5.6	2.8	—	0.9	—	1.3	–	—	–	52.5	44.4	8.1	6.7
YouGov	17–20 Sep 2021	1,253	30.8	9.4	6.6	4.4	7.3	6.8	17.0	1.0	8.4	2.0	—	1.1	—	–	4.5	—	–	50.3	44.5	5.8	5.9
Voxmeter	13–19 Sep 2021	1,001	27.7	13.6	6.1	4.3	9.8	9.7	13.5	0.4	5.7	3.1	—	1.4	—	0.0	—	—	4.7	51.9	43.4	8.5	9.5
YouGov	10–12 Sep 2021	1,263	31.0	10.3	7.1	4.0	7.9	7.4	16.9	0.6	9.8	2.2	—	1.7	—	1.2	—	—	–	50.8	48.0	2.8	4.0
Voxmeter	23–29 Aug 2021	1,006	28.4	15.1	5.6	5.6	8.8	9.3	13.9	0.5	5.8	2.9	—	1.8	—	0.0	—	—	2.3	52.6	45.1	7.5	8.8
Epinion	19–26 Aug 2021	1,639	28.6	15.2	5.5	6.4	7.8	7.1	13.6	1.3	9.3	2.3	—	1.2	—	0.3	—	—	–	51.5	47.1	4.5	4.0
Voxmeter	16–22 Aug 2021	1,003	29.3	14.5	6.4	5.5	9.4	9.1	13.4	0.2	6.3	2.6	—	2.1	—	0.1	—	—	1.1	53.6	45.3	8.3	8.0
YouGov	13–16 Aug 2021	1,253	31.5	9.8	7.2	4.5	7.7	7.8	14.6	1.6	9.7	3.2	—	1.4	—	1.1	—	—	–	53.0	45.9	7.1	7.0
Voxmeter	9–15 Aug 2021	1,007	30.6	13.7	5.8	6.0	9.3	9.1	12.9	0.2	6.8	2.1	—	2.1	—	0.1	—	—	1.3	55.3	43.4	11.9	11.6
Voxmeter	2–7 Aug 2021	1,004	30.3	14.5	5.9	5.4	9.8	9.1	13.4	0.0	6.0	1.7	—	2.2	—	0.3	—	—	1.4	54.9	43.7	11.2	12.6
Gallup	30 Jul–5 Aug 2021	1,735	27.9	13.5	7.0	6.1	9.6	7.7	14.4	0.6	7.0	2.1	0.6	2.1	0.2	0.1	—	—	1.1	52.0	46.9	5.1	5.2
Voxmeter	21–27 Jun 2021	1,003	28.9	15.1	6.3	5.6	9.5	8.8	13.2	0.3	6.4	1.9	–	1.8	–	0.2	—	—	2.0	53.3	44.7	8.6	11.8
Voxmeter	14–20 Jun 2021	1,022	28.4	14.6	6.7	5.3	9.1	8.6	13.8	0.8	6.7	1.8	–	1.5	–	0.1	—	—	2.6	52.3	45.1	6.8	9.6
Voxmeter	7–12 Jun 2021	1,030	29.3	13.6	6.4	5.6	8.7	8.5	13.9	1.0	6.4	2.3	–	1.3	–	0.0	—	—	3.0	53.1	43.9	9.8	9.5
Gallup	4–10 Jun 2021	1,465	26.7	12.8	7.3	8.3	7.5	8.3	13.8	0.3	8.5	2.4	–	2.3	0.5	–	—	—	–	51.4	47.6	3.8	3.7
YouGov	4–6 Jun 2021	1,258	33.4	11.6	7.3	3.9	8.1	8.0	14.1	0.7	8.8	2.6	–	1.2	–	0.6	—	—	–	54.0	45.5	8.5	9.0
Voxmeter	31 May–6 Jun 2021	1,044	30.5	13.3	6.7	6.1	8.2	8.1	13.0	0.6	7.0	2.7	–	1.9	–	0.6	—	—	1.3	54.1	44.6	9.5	10.2
Voxmeter	24–30 May 2021	1,005	31.7	12.5	5.7	5.9	8.6	8.4	13.5	0.4	7.5	2.2	–	1.6	–	0.0	—	—	2.0	55.0	43.0	12.0	13.2
Voxmeter	17–23 May 2021	1,011	31.0	11.4	5.5	5.5	8.0	9.0	14.2	0.9	7.7	2.5	–	1.8	0.2	–	—	—	2.3	54.6	43.1	11.5	12.2
Epinion	11–19 May 2021	1,552	28.6	12.3	6.3	5.5	8.7	8.1	15.9	0.7	6.6	2.2	–	2.2	–	0.6	—	—	–	52.2	45.5	6.7	5.4
Voxmeter	10–16 May 2021	1,008	31.8	11.8	5.9	5.9	7.9	9.2	13.4	1.1	6.9	2.5	–	1.9	–	0.4	—	—	1.3	56.3	42.4	13.9	14.3
YouGov	7–9 May 2021	1,263	33.0	10.7	5.5	3.7	7.8	7.5	13.7	0.8	11.6	2.9	–	1.7	–	0.8	—	—	–	52.8	46.2	6.6	7.6
Voxmeter	3–8 May 2021	1,023	32.1	11.6	5.3	5.3	8.6	8.9	14.0	0.6	7.2	2.9	–	2.1	–	0.2	—	—	1.2	55.7	43.1	12.6	11.8
Voxmeter	26 Apr–2 May 2021	1,022	31.2	12.3	6.1	4.1	8.0	8.6	14.9	0.9	7.6	3.3	–	1.7	–	0.2	—	—	1.1	53.0	45.9	7.1	7.7
Voxmeter	19–25 Apr 2021	1,013	32.6	11.5	5.7	3.6	7.5	9.3	15.5	0.6	8.1	3.2	–	1.4	–	0.2	—	—	0.8	53.8	45.4	8.4	9.0
Voxmeter	12–18 Apr 2021	1,024	31.3	11.3	6.5	4.3	7.3	9.2	15.2	0.8	8.7	2.4	–	1.4	–	0.2	—	—	1.4	53.1	45.5	7.6	8.0
Epinion	7–13 Apr 2021	1,578	30.7	10.4	5.3	5.0	8.1	7.6	15.5	1.0	8.8	2.5	–	2.2	–	0.5	—	—	–	52.9	44.7	8.2	6.7
YouGov	9–11 Apr 2021	1,258	33.2	8.7	6.8	4.8	7.4	7.4	15.0	0.3	11.7	2.9	–	1.2	–	0.6	—	—	–	53.0	46.4	6.6	7.7
Voxmeter	5–10 Apr 2021	1,014	32.0	12.1	5.7	4.9	7.6	8.6	15.2	0.8	9.0	1.8	–	1.3	–	0.2	—	—	0.8	54.1	45.1	9.0	11.1
Gallup	2–8 Apr 2021	1,698	29.3	12.6	6.7	6.5	7.8	9.1	16.7	0.4	6.8	2.3	–	–	–	–	—	—	–	53.2	46.2	7.0	7.6
Voxmeter	29 Mar–4 Apr 2021	1,019	30.9	12.7	5.6	5.3	7.8	7.7	16.0	0.9	8.7	2.1	–	1.3	–	0.0	—	—	1.0	52.6	46.4	6.2	6.6
Voxmeter	22–28 Mar 2021	1,031	33.4	11.2	5.9	5.0	7.5	8.0	14.4	1.1	8.9	2.4	–	1.7	–	0.0	—	—	0.5	55.0	44.5	10.5	11.1
Voxmeter	15–21 Mar 2021	1,034	34.1	11.9	5.8	5.3	8.1	7.6	13.8	0.7	8.0	2.2	–	1.4	–	0.5	—	—	0.6	56.3	43.1	13.2	13.4
Voxmeter	7–14 Mar 2021	1,032	32.8	12.1	5.7	4.4	7.6	8.3	14.6	0.8	8.5	2.3	–	1.9	–	0.6	—	—	0.4	54.5	45.1	9.4	9.9
Voxmeter	1–6 Mar 2021	1,028	32.4	12.3	5.6	5.1	8.1	8.4	14.0	0.8	8.7	1.9	–	2.1	–	0.3	—	—	0.3	55.1	44.6	10.5	11.3
Voxmeter	22–28 Feb 2021	1,034	32.6	11.2	6.4	5.7	7.6	7.9	13.5	0.9	9.0	2.1	–	1.7	–	0.4	—	—	1.0	55.1	43.9	11.2	11.6
Voxmeter	15–21 Feb 2021	1,041	32.1	12.7	6.2	6.2	8.0	7.9	13.1	0.5	8.0	2.4	–	1.7	–	0.4	—	—	0.8	55.1	44.1	11.0	11.8
Voxmeter	8–15 Feb 2021	1,040	32.9	11.8	6.6	5.6	7.1	8.7	12.9	0.5	8.4	2.9	–	1.5	–	0.4	—	—	0.7	55.2	44.1	11.1	11.7
Electica	1–14 Feb 2021	4,138	32.6	9.8	7.6	4.0	7.2	7.7	12.6	1.0	11.0	2.8	–	1.4	–	0.9	—	—	1.5	53.4	45.2	8.2	7.7
YouGov	5–8 Feb 2021	1,261	35.1	9.3	7.9	3.5	7.0	7.3	15.0	0.7	10.7	2.1	–	1.0	–	0.5	—	—	–	53.5	46.0	7.5	7.9
Voxmeter	1–6 Feb 2021	1,034	33.1	12.3	5.9	6.4	7.6	8.0	11.9	1.0	7.9	2.7	–	1.5	–	0.9	—	—	0.8	57.0	42.2	14.8	14.4
Voxmeter	25–31 Jan 2021	1,028	32.2	12.5	6.3	5.4	7.3	8.5	12.1	1.7	7.9	2.9	–	1.5	–	1.1	—	—	0.6	56.2	43.2	13.0	11.7
Gallup	22–28 Jan 2021	1,497	29.5	12.8	7.1	7.4	6.9	6.5	13.6	1.2	8.4	3.0	0.2	2.2	0.6	–	—	—	–	51.5	47.9	3.6	3.2
Voxmeter	18–24 Jan 2021	1,016	33.4	13.6	5.5	5.9	7.4	8.5	11.4	0.9	7.0	3.2	–	1.4	–	1.3	—	—	0.5	57.4	40.7	16.7	14.5
Epinion	18–21 Jan 2021	1,735	32.5	13.3	5.3	6.4	7.6	6.9	12.5	0.6	9.6	2.4	–	1.2	–	0.2	—	—	1.5	54.2	44.3	9.9	10.3
YouGov	15–18 Jan 2021	1,246	33.4	9.2	8.0	4.7	6.7	7.1	12.9	0.9	11.8	2.8	–	1.9	–	0.7	—	—	–	52.8	46.6	6.2	7.2
Voxmeter	11–17 Jan 2021	1,035	33.3	13.0	6.6	6.6	8.4	8.2	10.9	0.8	5.8	2.8	–	1.6	–	1.4	—	—	0.6	58.7	40.7	16.0	17.4
Voxmeter	4–9 Jan 2021	1,040	32.2	13.9	6.5	6.6	8.7	9.1	10.5	0.5	6.6	3.0	–	1.5	–	0.7	—	—	0.4	57.8	41.8	16.0	16.1
2019 election	5 Jun 2019	–	25.9	23.4	8.7	8.6	7.7	6.9	6.6	3.0	2.4	2.3	1.8	1.7	0.8	–	–	–	0.0	52.1	47.8	4.3	8.7

=== 2020 ===
			Parties															Blocs			
Polling firm	Fieldwork date	Sample size	A	V	O	B	F	Ø	C	Å	D	I	P	K	E	G	Others	Red	Blue	Lead	
Polling firm	Fieldwork date	Sample size	A	V	O	B	F	Ø	C	Å	D	I	P	K	E	G	Others	Red	Blue	All parties	Above 2%
	17–25 Dec 2020	Second lockdown phased in																			
Voxmeter	14–20 Dec 2020	1,020	32.8	17.3	5.4	6.3	7.7	7.8	10.0	1.0	7.0	3.0	–	1.4	–	0.2	0.1	55.8	44.1	11.7	11.9
Voxmeter	7–12 Dec 2020	1,029	32.9	18.9	5.4	7.0	7.4	7.4	10.4	0.6	5.9	2.2	–	1.4	–	0.2	0.3	55.5	44.2	11.0	11.9
Gallup	4–10 Dec 2020	1,496	29.5	17.5	4.7	6.3	8.2	7.1	11.7	0.8	7.8	2.8	0.8	1.4	0.6	0.4	0.4	52.3	47.3	5.0	6.6
Epinion	1–8 Dec 2020	1,692	31.5	17.6	5.8	6.7	7.1	6.9	9.9	0.2	7.8	3.7	–	1.6	–	0.5	0.7	52.9	46.4	6.5	7.4
YouGov	4–7 Dec 2020	1,251	33.2	14.3	6.5	5.2	7.5	7.5	10.4	0.4	8.7	3.1	0.7	1.4	–	1.3	0.6	53.6	45.1	8.5	10.4
Voxmeter	30 Nov–5 Dec 2020	1,033	31.2	19.2	5.7	7.4	7.7	7.9	9.7	1.0	5.6	2.4	–	1.6	–	0.0	0.6	55.2	44.2	11.0	11.6
Voxmeter	23–29 Nov 2020	1,043	30.2	19.7	5.7	7.0	8.3	7.9	9.1	0.6	6.0	2.7	–	1.8	–	0.4	0.6	54.4	45.0	9.4	10.2
Voxmeter	16–22 Nov 2020	1,021	29.2	20.3	5.1	6.3	8.6	8.4	9.1	0.6	5.2	3.2	–	2.3	–	0.5	1.2	53.6	45.2	8.4	7.3
Voxmeter	9–15 Nov 2020	1,034	31.3	18.6	5.4	5.1	9.0	8.7	9.5	0.4	5.3	2.7	–	2.5	–	0.5	1.0	55.0	44.0	11.0	10.1
Gallup	6–12 Nov 2020	1,664	29.2	18.4	5.6	6.3	7.4	7.4	9.8	0.6	8.9	2.7	0.7	1.8	0.3	0.6	0.2	51.5	48.3	3.2	4.9
YouGov	6–11 Nov 2020	1,247	33.6	15.7	6.3	4.3	6.3	7.8	10.0	0.6	9.6	2.9	0.6	1.7	–	0.8	–	52.6	46.7	5.9	7.5
Voxmeter	2–7 Nov 2020	1,028	32.5	18.5	5.8	4.6	8.3	7.8	9.5	0.8	5.7	2.2	–	2.8	–	0.6	0.9	54.6	44.5	10.1	8.7
Voxmeter	26 Oct–1 Nov 2020	1,021	30.5	19.4	5.0	5.7	8.8	7.4	9.9	0.8	6.1	2.3	–	2.4	–	0.6	1.1	53.8	45.1	8.7	7.3
Voxmeter	19–25 Oct 2020	1,018	29.7	20.4	5.9	5.1	8.7	7.8	9.3	1.1	6.4	2.2	0.6	1.7	–	0.8	0.3	53.2	46.5	6.7	7.1
Voxmeter	12–18 Oct 2020	1,018	30.8	18.3	6.9	7.3	8.8	7.2	9.3	1.1	4.8	2.6	0.6	1.7	–	0.4	0.2	55.6	44.2	11.4	12.2
Voxmeter	5–10 Oct 2020	1,007	31.4	19.8	6.7	7.8	7.9	6.9	9.6	0.9	4.3	2.2	0.6	1.3	–	0.6	0.5	55.5	44.0	11.5	11.4
YouGov	2–5 Oct 2020	1,254	32.4	15.8	6.8	6.5	5.6	6.6	10.6	0.7	9.4	2.1	0.6	1.6	–	1.5	–	51.8	46.7	5.1	6.4
Gallup	28 Sep–4 Oct 2020	2,046	29.4	19.1	6.2	8.3	7.1	6.7	10.4	0.9	6.7	2.1	0.6	1.6	0.1	0.7	0.1	53.1	46.8	6.3	7.0
Voxmeter	28 Sep–4 Oct 2020	1,629	32.4	18.6	7.1	8.5	8.2	6.5	9.0	0.9	4.3	2.4	0.1	1.5	–	0.4	0.8	56.9	43.0	13.9	14.2
Epinion	22–28 Sep 2020	1,629	31.3	17.7	6.6	6.6	6.8	7.3	10.6	0.6	6.9	2.1	1.0	1.4	–	0.3	0.8	52.9	46.3	6.6	8.1
Voxmeter	21–27 Sep 2020	1,032	33.1	19.3	6.1	8.9	8.6	7.0	8.1	1.0	4.1	1.9	0.3	1.3	–	0.3	0.2	58.7	41.1	17.6	20.0
Voxmeter	14–20 Sep 2020	1,021	32.9	18.4	6.8	8.3	8.2	7.6	8.4	0.8	3.8	2.1	0.4	1.8	–	0.2	0.1	58.2	41.7	16.5	17.5
Voxmeter	7–12 Sep 2020	1,106	32.6	19.9	6.2	7.8	8.8	7.3	8.0	0.4	4.4	1.8	0.8	1.5	–	—	0.5	56.9	42.6	14.3	18.0
Epinion	1–8 Sep 2020	1,629	33.2	17.2	6.9	7.1	6.6	6.3	8.7	0.9	6.2	2.5	0.8	2.4	–	—	–	54.1	44.7	9.4	9.3
Voxmeter	31 Aug–6 Sep 2020	1,034	33.4	20.4	6.0	6.8	8.6	7.7	7.5	0.4	4.7	2.3	0.3	1.5	–	—	0.4	56.9	42.7	14.2	15.6
Voxmeter	24–30 Aug 2020	1,024	32.4	19.5	7.3	7.5	7.8	7.3	8.7	0.5	4.4	2.1	0.2	1.6	–	—	0.9	55.5	43.6	11.9	13.0
Voxmeter	17–23 Aug 2020	1,037	32.6	18.8	7.0	7.6	7.7	7.8	8.1	0.7	4.6	2.3	0.5	0.3	0.2	—	?	56.3	41.1	15.2	14.9
Gallup	13 Aug 2020	1,505	30.3	19.0	7.6	7.5	7.6	7.3	9.1	0.4	6.5	2.4	0.4	1.5	0.1	—	0.3	53.1	46.6	5.6	8.1
Voxmeter	10–16 Aug 2020	1,033	32.9	17.8	7.0	7.8	7.4	8.0	7.9	0.7	4.5	2.7	0.6	–	0.2	—	2.5	56.8	40.7	16.1	16.2
Voxmeter	3–8 Aug 2020	1,007	33.4	18.9	6.1	7.4	8.3	8.4	6.9	1.2	4.2	1.9	0.6	–	0.3	—	?	58.7	38.9	19.8	21.4
Gallup	Jul 2020	–	30.3	19.0	7.6	7.5	7.6	7.5	9.1	0.4	6.5	2.4	0.5	–	0.0	—	1.6	53.3	45.1	8.2	8.3
YouGov	2–6 Jul 2020	1,239	32.7	17.0	6.5	6.4	6.7	7.7	8.8	0.7	8.1	3.0	0.7	0.7	?	—	?	54.2	44.8	9.4	10.1
Voxmeter	22–28 Jun 2020	1,035	35.5	20.1	5.4	7.3	7.3	7.3	6.8	0.5	5.3	2.4	0.6	–	0.0	—	1.5	57.9	40.6	17.3	17.4
Voxmeter	15–21 Jun 2020	1,032	34.6	19.9	6.0	8.0	7.4	8.0	7.5	0.6	4.0	2.0	0.4	–	0.3	—	1.3	58.6	40.1	18.5	18.6
Voxmeter	8–13 Jun 2020	1,036	34.0	20.4	6.6	8.4	7.0	7.9	7.3	0.5	3.4	2.1	0.8	–	1.1	—	0.5	57.8	41.7	16.1	17.5
Gallup	11 Jun 2020	1,507	33.1	21.4	6.1	7.4	6.6	6.6	7.0	1.5	5.8	2.1	0.4	1.7	0.0	—	0.3	55.2	44.1	11.1	11.3
YouGov	8–10 Jun 2020	1,255	33.8	18.6	6.6	7.5	6.6	7.0	7.6	0.8	7.7	1.8	1.3	0.7	?	—	?	55.8	44.2	11.6	14.4
Voxmeter	1–7 Jun 2020	1,034	35.5	19.1	5.9	7.6	7.4	8.5	7.3	0.8	2.5	2.2	1.1	–	0.6	—	1.5	59.8	38.7	21.1	22.0
Voxmeter	25–31 May 2020	1,036	34.7	19.5	6.5	7.7	7.7	9.0	7.6	0.5	2.7	2.5	0.5	–	0.0	—	0.8	59.6	39.6	20.0	20.3
Epinion	22–29 May 2020	1,642	34.5	20.4	6.8	6.2	7.3	6.1	6.9	1.1	5.8	2.8	0.8	–	0.0	—	–	55.2	43.5	12.3	11.4
Voxmeter	18–24 May 2020	1,027	35.8	19.1	6.4	7.9	7.8	7.8	7.1	0.9	2.3	2.3	1.0	–	0.3	—	1.3	60.2	38.5	21.7	22.1
Voxmeter	11–17 May 2020	1,027	34.7	20.4	7.2	7.5	7.2	8.0	6.8	0.9	2.1	1.7	1.6	–	0.5	—	1.4	58.3	40.3	18.0	20.9
YouGov	7–11 May 2020	1,251	32.9	19.4	8.6	7.9	6.3	6.6	7.7	1.2	5.8	1.4	1.2	1.4	0.0	—	0.0	54.9	45.1	9.8	12.2
Voxmeter	4–9 May 2020	1,043	33.8	21.6	6.2	7.8	7.8	7.3	7.7	0.6	2.1	2.2	1.2	–	0.5	—	1.2	57.3	41.5	15.8	16.9
Voxmeter	27 Apr–3 May 2020	1,025	33.3	21.1	6.7	8.1	7.4	7.9	6.9	0.7	2.1	2.4	1.9	–	1.0	—	0.5	57.4	42.1	15.3	17.5
Voxmeter	20–26 Apr 2020	1,029	35.6	20.9	7.2	7.7	6.9	7.1	6.6	0.5	1.6	1.9	1.4	–	1.1	—	1.5	57.8	40.7	17.1	22.6
Epinion	10–16 Apr 2020	1,636	35.1	21.0	8.3	6.1	6.9	6.6	7.4	1.0	3.1	2.2	0.6	–	0.5	—	?	55.7	43.1	12.5	12.7
Voxmeter	6–19 Apr 2020	1,043	35.1	21.5	6.8	7.2	7.3	7.2	6.1	0.8	2.1	1.4	1.5	–	1.1	—	1.9	57.6	40.5	17.1	20.3
Voxmeter	30 Mar–11 Apr 2020	1,052	35.1	22.0	7.3	7.5	7.2	6.7	6.5	1.1	2.5	1.5	1.1	–	0.0	—	1.5	57.6	40.9	16.7	18.2
Voxmeter	23 Mar–05 Apr 2020	1,064	34.0	21.8	7.7	7.9	7.5	6.9	6.0	0.8	3.0	1.2	1.4	–	0.0	—	1.8	57.1	41.1	16.0	17.8
Gallup	27 Mar–3 Apr 2020	1,519	32.0	21.9	8.1	8.0	6.9	7.5	6.9	0.8	4.1	1.5	0.9	1.2	0.3	—	0.0	55.2	44.8	10.4	13.4
Voxmeter	23–29 Mar 2020	1,071	31.5	22.2	8.1	9.2	7.8	7.4	6.3	0.6	2.5	1.5	1.0	–	0.0	—	1.9	56.5	41.6	14.9	16.8
Voxmeter	16–22 Mar 2020	1,027	28.2	23.3	7.8	10.4	7.8	7.8	6.5	0.6	2.1	2.1	1.4	–	0.1	—	1.9	54.8	43.3	11.5	12.4
Voxmeter	9–15 Mar 2020	1,041	27.2	24.0	7.2	9.4	8.3	8.1	7.0	0.9	1.9	2.3	1.9	–	0.4	—	1.4	53.9	44.7	9.2	12.5
	13 Mar 2020	Government announces nationwide lockdown in response to COVID-19 pandemic																			
Voxmeter	2–7 Mar 2020	1,055	27.5	23.3	7.6	8.7	7.8	7.7	7.7	1.6	2.6	2.1	1.4	–	1.1	—	0.9	53.3	45.8	7.5	8.4
Epinion	25 Feb–02 Mar 2020	1,602	27.7	22.3	8.0	8.7	7.1	7.6	7.4	2.0	4.1	1.8	1.7	–	0.3	—	0.0	53.1	45.6	7.5	11.3
Voxmeter	24 Feb–1 Mar 2020	1,033	26.8	23.6	8.2	8.8	8.5	7.7	7.0	2.1	2.4	2.2	2.1	–	0.5	—	0.1	53.9	46.0	7.9	8.4
Voxmeter	17–23 Feb 2020	1,049	27.5	23.8	8.8	8.5	8.0	7.2	7.6	1.5	1.9	2.1	1.5	–	0.0	—	1.6	52.7	45.7	7.0	8.9
Voxmeter	10–16 Feb 2020	1,003	27.8	24.4	8.3	8.0	7.5	7.7	7.6	1.6	1.6	1.6	1.9	–	0.5	—	1.5	52.6	45.9	6.7	10.7
Gallup	7–13 Feb 2020	1,523	26.4	22.4	8.3	7.4	8.0	6.9	8.1	3.3	4.8	1.8	0.7	0.3	0.3	—	1.3	52.0	46.4	5.6	8.4
Voxmeter	3–8 Feb 2020	1,048	28.4	23.9	7.7	8.4	8.0	7.2	7.0	1.9	2.1	1.7	1.8	–	0.1	—	1.8	53.9	44.3	9.6	11.3
Voxmeter	27 Jan–2 Feb 2020	1,025	27.2	22.1	8.3	9.1	8.3	6.9	7.2	2.4	2.5	2.2	1.9	–	0.6	—	1.3	53.9	44.8	9.1	11.6
Voxmeter	20–26 Jan 2020	1,027	27.8	22.6	8.0	9.0	8.1	7.3	7.5	2.6	2.0	1.7	2.3	–	0.1	—	1.0	54.8	44.2	10.6	12.4
Voxmeter	13–19 Jan 2020	1,037	27.2	22.3	8.1	8.7	8.6	7.1	8.0	2.6	1.8	2.2	1.8	–	0.6	—	1.0	54.2	44.8	9.4	13.6
Voxmeter	6–11 Jan 2020	1,030	27.0	22.8	8.6	8.2	8.2	6.6	7.5	3.1	1.5	2.1	2.2	–	1.1	—	1.1	53.1	45.8	7.3	9.9
Voxmeter	30 Dec 2019–5 Jan 2020	1,029	26.0	23.8	8.0	8.9	8.1	7.4	8.5	3.1	2.1	1.4	1.6	–	0.4	—	0.7	53.5	45.8	7.7	11.1
2019 election	5 Jun 2019	–	25.9	23.4	8.7	8.6	7.7	6.9	6.6	3.0	2.4	2.3	1.8	1.7	0.8	–	0.0	52.1	47.8	4.3	8.7

=== 2019 ===
			Parties														Blocs			
Polling firm	Fieldwork date	Sample size	A	V	O	B	F	Ø	C	Å	D	I	P	K	E	Others	Red	Blue	Lead	
Polling firm	Fieldwork date	Sample size	A	V	O	B	F	Ø	C	Å	D	I	P	K	E	Others	Red	Blue	All parties	Above 2%
Voxmeter	16–22 Dec 2019	1,032	25.5	23.9	8.5	8.5	7.6	7.8	8.1	2.7	1.5	1.6	2.1	–	0.9	1.3	52.1	46.6	5.5	9.5
Voxmeter	9–15 Dec 2019	1,036	26.3	23.1	8.2	8.5	8.4	7.5	8.0	2.1	1.9	2.1	1.9	–	0.3	1.4	52.8	45.5	7.3	11.4
Gallup	12 Dec 2019	1,484	26.2	23.5	7.8	8.5	6.9	8.0	8.2	2.3	3.6	1.7	1.0	1.5	0.8	0.0	51.9	48.1	3.8	8.8
Voxmeter	2–8 Dec 2019	–	25.8	23.7	9.0	7.9	8.3	8.2	7.4	2.1	1.2	2.6	1.4	–	0.5	1.4	52.3	45.8	6.5	9.6
Voxmeter	25 Nov–2 Dec 2019	–	26.6	22.9	9.8	8.7	8.3	7.4	7.1	2.4	1.3	2.4	1.2	–	0.0	1.9	53.4	44.7	8.7	11.2
Voxmeter	18–25 Nov 2019	–	26.9	23.7	9.3	7.9	8.2	8.1	6.3	2.4	1.5	1.9	1.3	–	0.6	1.9	53.5	44.5	9.0	14.2
Voxmeter	11–18 Nov 2019	–	27.5	24.3	8.7	8.4	7.6	8.3	6.7	2.3	1.4	1.8	1.6	0.9	0.0	0.7	54.1	45.4	8.7	14.4
Voxmeter	4–10 Nov 2019	1,034	26.9	23.7	9.0	8.3	8.2	7.7	6.8	2.1	1.5	2.1	1.9	1.5	0.1	0.2	53.2	46.6	6.6	11.6
Gallup	8 Nov 2019	1,525	26.1	23.0	9.0	8.6	7.4	7.1	7.4	2.6	3.7	1.8	0.9	1.8	0.5	0.1	51.8	48.1	3.7	8.7
Voxmeter	21–27 Oct 2019	1,030	26.9	23.4	9.1	8.1	9.3	7.7	7.3	1.7	1.2	2.2	1.5	0.9	0.7	0.0	53.7	46.3	7.4	10.0
Voxmeter	7–12 Oct 2019	1,025	26.9	23.5	9.2	9.0	8.0	7.7	7.5	1.8	0.7	2.4	1.7	1.1	0.2	0.3	53.4	46.3	7.1	9.0
Voxmeter	30 Sep–7 Oct 2019	1,050	28.0	24.5	8.6	8.7	8.3	7.0	6.9	2.6	1.2	1.7	1.0	1.4	0.0	0.1	54.6	45.3	9.3	14.6
Voxmeter	23–29 Sep 2019	1,041	27.2	23.8	9.0	9.5	9.1	6.9	6.4	2.5	1.8	1.8	0.8	0.9	0.2	0.0	55.2	44.7	10.5	16.0
Voxmeter	16–22 Sep 2019	1,041	27.7	21.8	9.4	9.0	8.5	7.1	6.9	2.1	1.4	2.2	1.3	1.3	0.0	0.3	54.4	45.3	9.1	14.1
Norstat	19 Sep 2019	1,000	26.2	22.5	10.9	8.0	7.2	7.2	6.5	2.8	2.5	2.7	1.5	1.3	0.5	0.3	51.4	48.4	3.0	6.3
Voxmeter	11–15 Sep 2019	1,043	27.7	21.9	8.9	9.6	7.8	6.7	7.1	2.7	1.0	2.6	1.7	1.2	0.8	0.3	54.5	45.2	9.3	14.0
Gallup	12 Sep 2019	1,666	25.5	22.4	9.4	7.9	8.0	7.5	8.4	2.6	2.8	2.6	1.1	1.4	0.3	0.1	51.5	48.4	3.1	5.9
Voxmeter	22–26 Aug 2019	1,034	27.3	23.2	8.4	8.8	8.7	7.0	7.0	2.4	1.6	2.4	1.5	1.6	0.0	0.1	54.2	45.7	8.5	13.2
Voxmeter	12–18 Aug 2019	1,063	26.2	23.8	8.3	8.5	8.9	7.4	7.4	2.6	1.3	2.0	1.8	1.6	0.1	0.1	53.6	46.3	7.3	12.1
Voxmeter	5–10 Aug 2019	1,006	25.7	25.4	8.2	8.0	8.6	8.2	7.2	2.4	0.8	1.9	2.0	1.2	0.3	0.1	52.9	47.0	5.9	10.1
Gallup	8 Aug 2019	1,535	25.5	23.5	9.5	8.9	7.7	7.4	7.0	2.4	2.8	2.3	1.2	1.4	0.2	0.0	51.9	47.7	4.2	6.8
Voxmeter	24–30 Jun 2019	1,068	24.9	24.4	8.4	8.7	7.4	7.1	7.2	2.7	2.5	2.2	1.7	1.8	0.5	0.5	50.8	48.7	2.1	6.1
Voxmeter	17–23 Jun 2019	1,037	25.3	25.0	8.3	8.7	7.8	7.0	6.9	2.6	2.2	2.4	1.8	1.6	0.1	0.3	51.4	48.3	3.1	6.6
Voxmeter	10–15 Jun 2019	1,007	25.2	24.3	7.4	9.3	8.2	7.2	7.4	2.5	2.8	1.8	2.3	1.5	–	0.2	52.4	47.5	4.9	8.2
2019 election	5 Jun 2019	–	25.9	23.4	8.7	8.6	7.7	6.9	6.6	3.0	2.4	2.3	1.8	1.7	0.8	0.0	52.1	47.8	4.3	8.7

=== Faroe Islands ===
Poll source	Fieldwork period	Sample size	B	C	A	E	F	D	H	Other	Lead
Kringvarp Føroya	6 Oct 2022		21.8	33.7	19.5	18.0	–	–	–	-	11.9
Portal.fo	30 Aug 2022		23.7	31.5	19.1	16.5	–	–	–	9.2	7.8
Gallup	30 Aug–16 Sep 2020		18.8	28.7	19.4	17.7	4.8	4.1	4.5	-	9.3
Faroese general election	31 August 2019	33,779	20.4	22.1	24.5	18.1	4.6	3.4	5.4	1.4	2.4
Folketinget election	5 June 2019	26,206	28.3	25.5	23.8	18.6	2.5	1.3	– (Note: Did not run)	0.0	2.8

=== Greenland ===
Poll source	Fieldwork period	Sample size	IA	S	D	NQ	N	A	SA	Other	Lead
General election	6 April 2021	26,486	37.4	30.1	9.3	2.4	12.3	7.1	1.4	0.0	7.3
Folketinget election	5 June 2019	20,615	33.4	29.4	11.0	7.8	7.6	5.3	2.5	0.0	4.0

== Preferred prime minister ==
=== All party leaders ===
These polls asked participants their preferred prime minister among all party leaders. Only Mette Frederiksen, Pape Poulsen, and Elleman-Jensen have actually declared their candidacy.

Polling firm	Fieldwork date	Sample size	Frederiksen A	Pape Poulsen C	Elleman-Jensen V	Løkke Rasmussen M	Støjberg Æ	Vanopslagh I	Olsen Dyhr F	Villadsen Ø	Vermund D	Carsten Nielsen B	Messerschmidt O	Siddique Q	Rosenkilde Å	Karlsmose K	Other / Don't Know
Epinion	11–13 Oct 2022	1053	25	10	6	11	8	6	5	3	2	1	1	1	1	0	22

=== Frederiksen vs. Pape Poulsen vs. Ellemann-Jensen ===
Polling firm	Fieldwork date	Sample size	Frederiksen A	Pape Poulsen C	Elleman-Jensen V	Other / Don't Know
Voxmeter	27 Oct 2022	≈1,000	59	10	31	–
Voxmeter	24 Oct 2022	≈1,000	57	13	30	–
Voxmeter	21 Oct 2022	≈1,000	58	15	27	–
Voxmeter	18 Oct 2022	≈1,000	55	16	29	–
Voxmeter	15 Oct 2022	≈1,000	58	18	24	–
Voxmeter	12 Oct 2022	≈1,000	56	19	25	–
Voxmeter	9 Oct 2022	≈1,000	54	22	24	–
Voxmeter	6 Oct 2022	≈1,000	52	26	22	–
Epinion	5 Oct 2022	1,220	39	21	16	24
Voxmeter	2 Oct 2022	≈1,000	49	27	23	–
Voxmeter	25 Sep 2022	≈1,000	51	30	18	–
Epinion	13–20 Sep 2022	1,025	39	24	14	23
Voxmeter	18 Sep 2022	≈1,000	50	31	19	–
Voxmeter	11 Sep 2022	≈1,000	52	34	14	–
Voxmeter	4 Sep 2022	≈1,000	49	35	16	–

=== Ellemann-Jensen vs. Pape Poulsen ===
Polling firm	Fieldwork date	Sample size	Elleman-Jensen V	Pape Poulsen C	Other / Don't Know
Kantar Gallup	14 Aug 2022		22	46.9	20

== See also ==
- Opinion polling for the 2015 Danish general election
- Opinion polling for the 2019 Danish general election
