= Malte Larsen (politician, born 2001) =

Danish politician (born 2001)

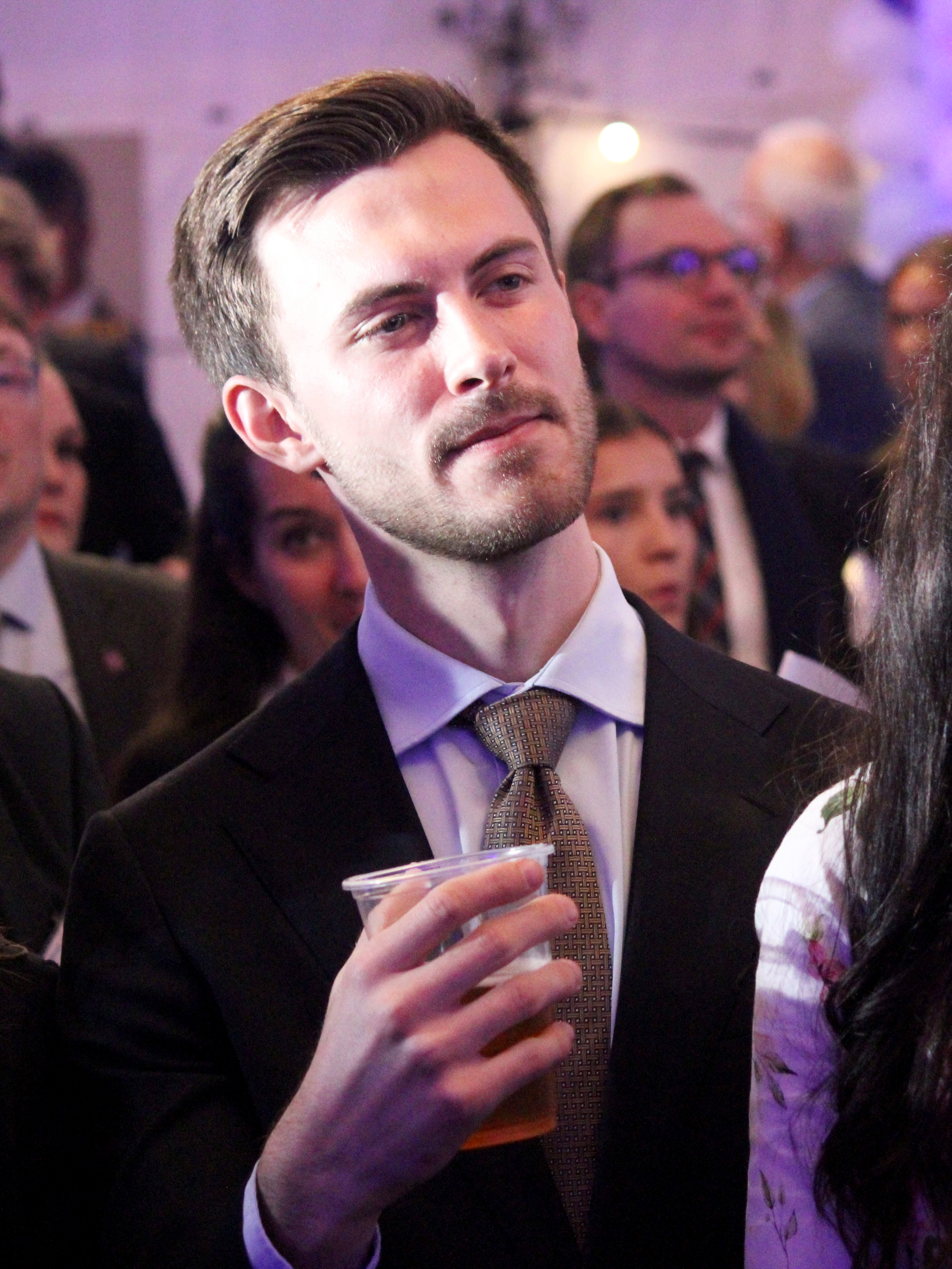
- Larsen in 2026

Member of the Folketing
- Incumbent
- Assumed office 24 March 2026
- Constituency: Zealand

Personal details
- Born: 15 July 2001 (age 25)
- Party: Danish People's Party (since 2023)
- Other political affiliations: New Right (until 2023)

Malte Boehm Larsen (born 15 July 2001) is a Danish politician who was elected member of the Folketing in 2026. From 2021 to 2023, he served as chairman of Nye Borgerliges Ungdom.
