= Rårup =

- Village
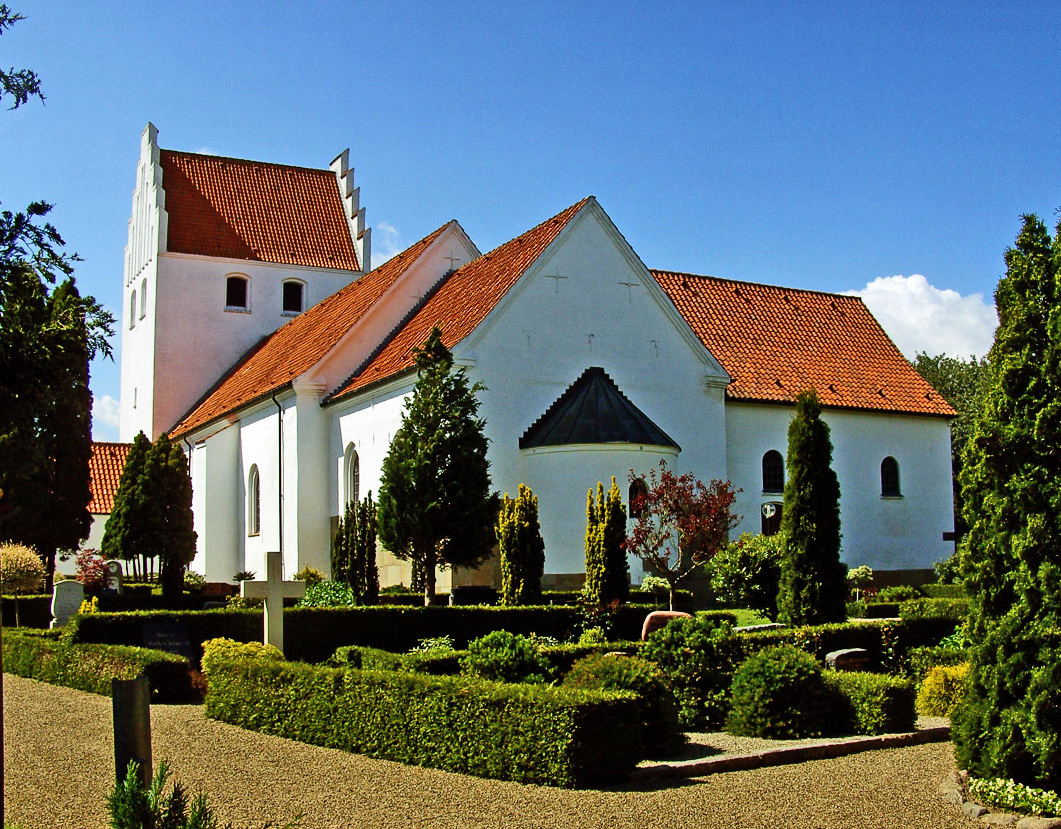
- Rårup Church

- Location in Denmark Rårup (Central Denmark Region)
- Coordinates: 55°46′29″N 9°55′47″E
- Country: Denmark
- Region: Mid Jutland
- Municipality: Hedensted

Area
  - Urban: 0.5 km^{2} (0.19 sq mi)

Population (2026)
  - Urban: 447
  - Urban density: 890/km^{2} (2,300/sq mi)
- Time zone: UTC+1 (CET)
  - Summer (DST): UTC+2 (CEST)
- Postal code: 4200

Rårup is a village in Hedensted Municipality in the Mid Jutland Region of Denmark. With a population of 447 (1. January 2026), Rårup is located in Rårup Parish (sogn) 13 km northwest of the town of Juelsminde, 14 km southeast of the city of Horsens and 16 km east of the town of Hedensted. Rårup Church is located in the village. Rårup Hal is located in the village. In the village's church named Sct. Anna is Frederik Rantzau (1677 – 1726) buried, in the Rantzauian Chapel (Det Rantzauske Kapel). Rårup School lies at Kirkedalsvej 64.

== Notable people ==
Hother A. Paludan (1871–1956), architect and civil servant

Mikkel Bjørn (b. 1995), current member of the Danish Parliament
