= Tech College Aalborg =

TECHCOLLEGE
- Aalborg Tekniske Skole
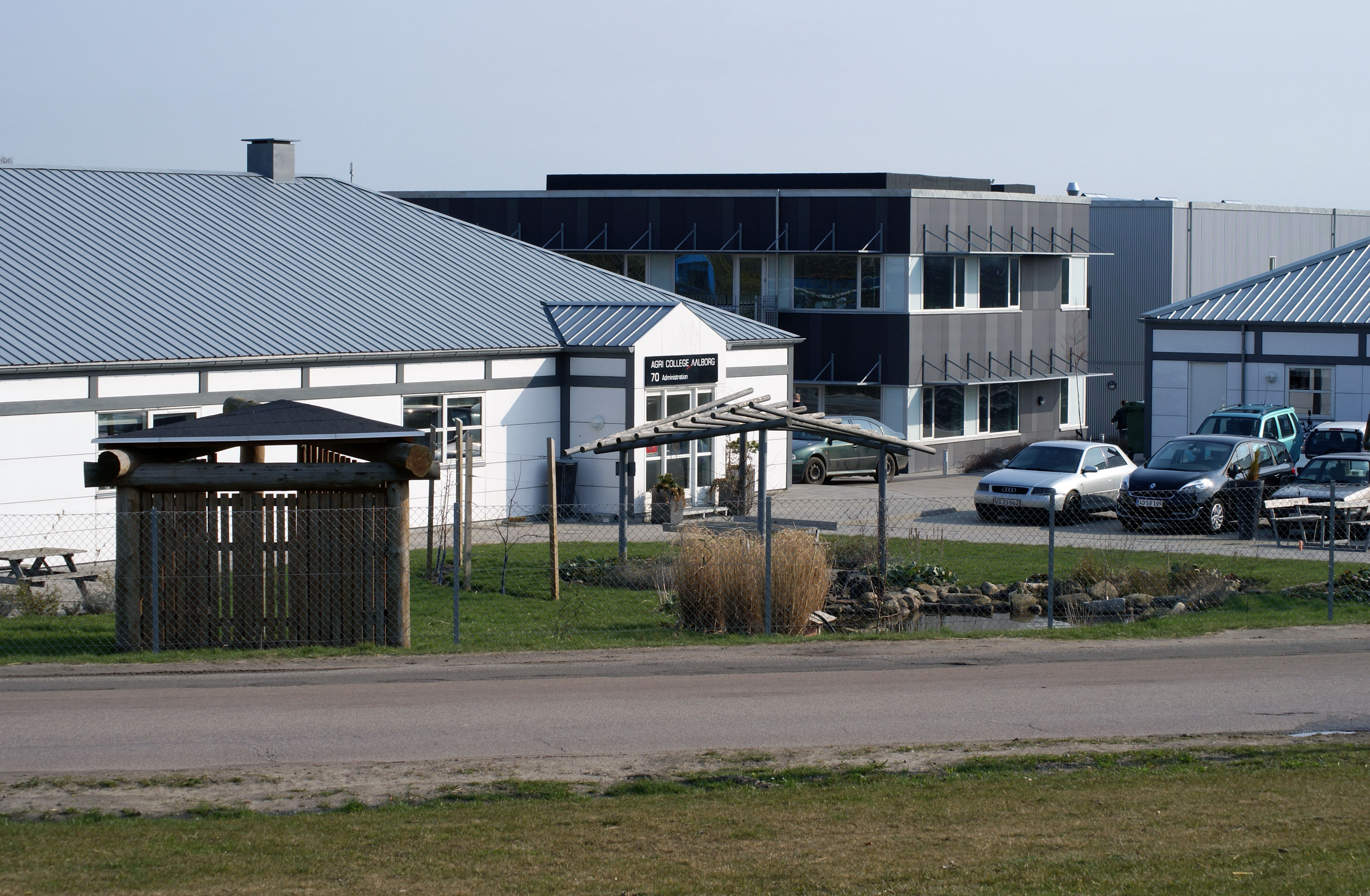
- Agri College: Buildings with administration and education

Location
- Øster Uttrup Vej 1; 9000 Aalborg; Denmark
- Coordinates: 57°2′54.02″N 9°57′58.79″E

Information
- President: Søren Samuelsen
- Staff: 650
- Website: www.techcollege.dk/english

Tech College Aalborg is a school in the city of Aalborg, in North Jutland in Denmark. It offers a wide spectrum of vocational training and runs Aalborg Tekniske Gymnasium. The school has about 4500 yearly students and 650 employees.

== Departments ==
TECHCOLLEGE is made of several departments in Aalborg.

Aalborg Tekniske Gymnasium (English: Aalborg Technical Gymnasium) is a part of TECHCOLLEGE. The gymnasium has about eleven classes each year, which is spread out on Øster Uttrup Vej 5 and Nyhavnsgade 14, both in Aalborg.
