= Peter Seier Christensen =

Danish politician (born 1967)

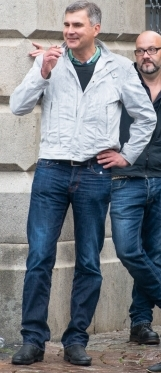
- Seier Christensen in 2015

Member of the Folketing
- In office 5 June 2019 – 24 March 2026
- Constituency: Zealand

Personal details
- Born: 30 December 1967 (age 58) Viborg, Denmark
- Party: Independent (since 2024)
- Other political affiliations: New Right (until 2024)

Peter Seier Christensen (born 30 December 1967) is a Danish politician, chemical engineer and inventor, who is a member of the Folketing for New Right political party. He was elected into the Folketing in the 2019 Danish general election.

== Education and career ==
Christensen studied chemical engineering at the Technical University of Denmark from 1986 to 1992, gaining masters and PhD. He was employed as an engineer by Haldor Topsøe from 1994 to 2019. While there he was the author of patents on reforming hydrocarbons, preparation of synthesis gas, particularly by steam reforming, and the use of catalyst lined equipment.

== Political career ==
Christensen first ran for parliament in the 2019 election, where he received 1,850 votes. This was enough for one of New Right's levelling seats. Since 2020 Peter Seier has been the group leader of the party's parliamentary group. At the 2022 general election he was re-elected a member of the Folketing with 2,806 votes.
