= Pernille Vermund =

Danish architect and politician

Pernille Vermund MF
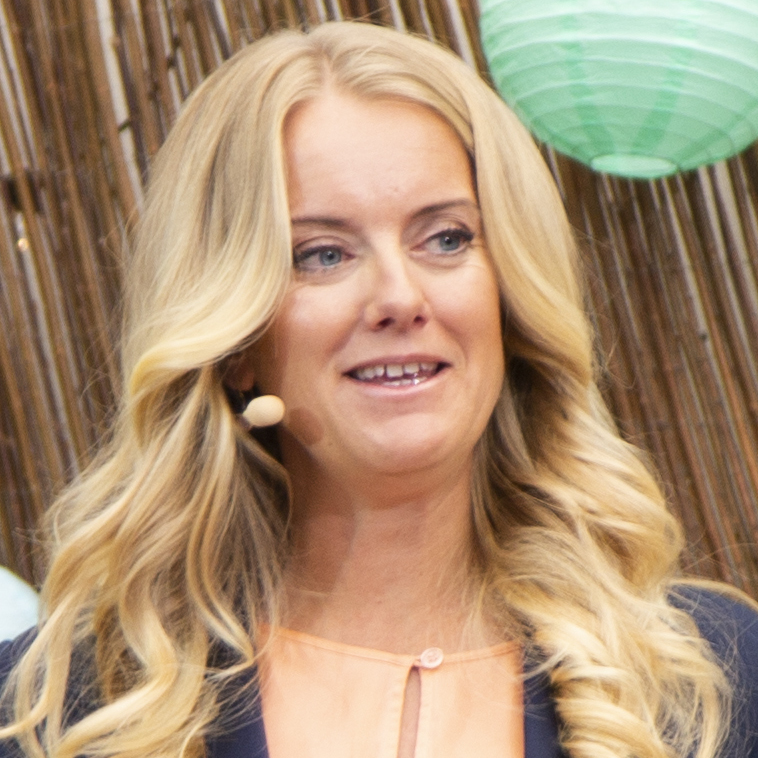

Leader of New Right
- In office 28 October 2023 – 10 January 2024
- Preceded by: Lars Boje Mathiesen
- Succeeded by: Martin Henriksen
- In office 19 October 2015 – 7 February 2023
- Preceded by: Office established
- Succeeded by: Lars Boje Mathiesen

Member of the Folketing
- Incumbent
- Assumed office 5 June 2019
- Constituency: South Jutland

Personal details
- Born: Ann Pernille Vermund Tvede; 3 December 1975 (age 50) Copenhagen, Denmark
- Party: Liberal Alliance (since 2024)
- Other political affiliations: Conservative People's (2009–2015); New Right (2015–2024)
- Education: Royal Danish Academy of Fine Arts

Ann Pernille Vermund Bretton-Meyer (born 3 December 1975) is a Danish architect (MAA) and politician, being a member of the Folketing since 2019. She is known for co-founding and being the leader of the national-conservative political party Nye Borgerlige (New Right) from its founding in 2015 until February 2023 and again from October 2023 to January 2024. On 10 January 2024, she surprisingly announced that she had left Nye Borgerlige, recommending its dissolution. A week later, she joined the parliamentary group of the Liberal Alliance.

Before the founding of Nye Borgerlige in 2015, Vermund was affiliated with the Conservative People's Party.

== Background ==
Vermund is a graduate of the Royal Danish Academy of Fine Arts and worked as an architect before entering politics. She was the owner of the company Vermund Gere Arkitekter MAA. Vermund is divorced from her first husband Johnny Gere and is the mother of three boys. In 2019, she married Danish author and businessman Lars Tvede. In 2021, they were divorced, and in March 2022 she announced her engagement to former DBU director Claus Bretton-Meyer.

== Political career ==
Vermund was a member of the Conservative People's Party and sat on the municipal council in Helsingør Municipality for the party from 2009 to 2011. In October 2015, she co-founded the New Right party with Peter Seier Christensen. Vermund said at the time that she founded the party as she felt her old party had become too soft on the issues of immigration and the European Union. In 2024, she stated that she had left the Conservative People's Party because she was "too liberal" to stay there, and that retrospectively she regretted some of her earlier statements in the immigration debate. She also stated that ideologically she was predominantly a classical liberal politician.

Vermund was elected to the Folketing in 2019. In January 2023, Vermund announced that she would resign as party leader and would not be standing for re-election to Parliament at the next Danish general election. On 7 February 2023 she was succeeded by Lars Boje Mathiesen as party leader. However, a month later Mathiesen was suddenly expelled from the party by its national executive after disputes over remuneration and campaign finances. Following the expulsion of Boje, Vermund conveyed her willingness to once again take over as party leader and to run in the next general election. In October 2023, she was unanimously elected as party chairman once more.

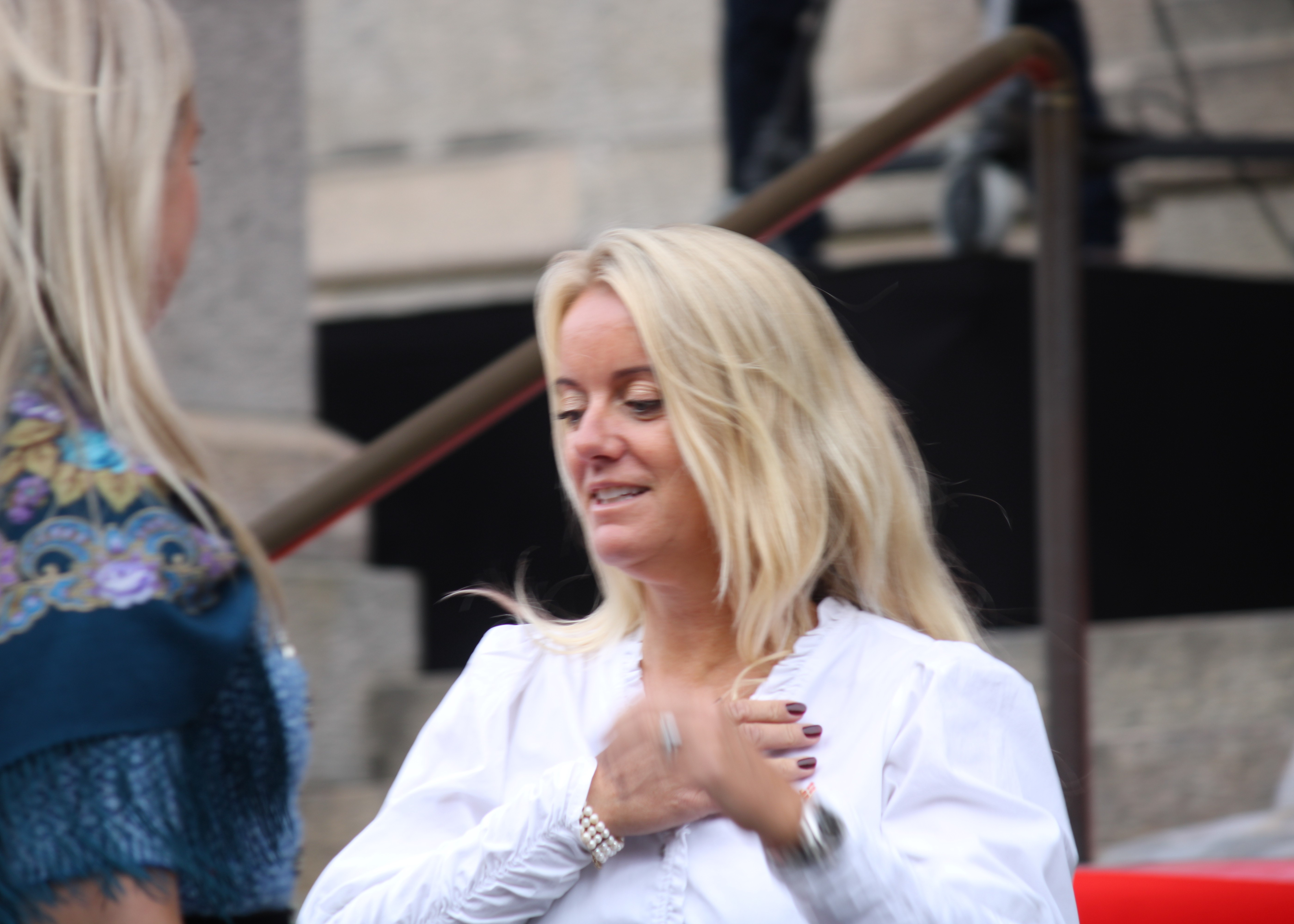
Vermund at the 2025 opening of the Danish parliament

On 10 January 2024, Vermund surprisingly announced that the party's parliamentary group would be dissolved, as she together with the remaining two MPs vould leave Nye Borgerlige in order to become independents. She also recommended the dissolution of the party. On 16 January the party's parliamentary group was formally dissolved, though the party itself still existed. On the following day, Vermund announced she had joined Liberal Alliance. She explained in a newspaper interview that the leader of Liberal Alliance Alex Vanopslagh had told her in December 2023 that she would be welcome in that party, after which she had considered the situation and made her decision to leave the party she had founded.

Vermund's personal vote performance
Election	Party	Election area	Votes
2009 local elections	K	Helsingør	331
2015 general election	K	North Zealand	2,028
2019 general election	NB	South Jutland	13,391
2022 general election	NB	South Jutland	15,375
2026 general election	LA	Zealand	5,751

== General references ==
- Vermund, Pernille; Asger Garde (2022). Borgerlige tanker : taler og artikler 2015-22 [Civil Thoughts: Speeches and Articles 2015-22] (in Danish). Ålsgårde: Peter La Cour. ISBN 978-87-88606-54-6. OCLC 1346842929.
- Karker, Andreas (2018). Værdikrigeren : et portræt af Pernille Vermund [The Value Warrior: A Portrait of Pernille Vermund] (in Danish). Kbh.: Gyldendal. ISBN 978-87-02-26971-0. OCLC 1091767475.
