= New Right (Denmark) =

Political party in Denmark

New Right Nye Borgerlige
- Abbreviation: NB
- Leader: Susanne Borggaard
- Founders: Pernille Vermund; Peter Seier Christensen
- Founded: 19 October 2015; 11 years ago
- Headquarters: Christiansborg; 1241 København K
- Youth wing: Nye Borgerliges Ungdom^{da}
- Membership (October 2023): 6,500
- Ideology: National conservatism; Right-libertarianism; Right-wing populism
- Political position: Far-right
- Colours: Teal
- Folketing: 0 / 179 (Note: Only 175 of the 179 seats in the Danish Parliament, the Folketing, are obtainable by Danish political parties as Greenland and the Faroe Islands are assigned two seats each due to their status as territories in the Kingdom of Denmark.)
- European Parliament: 0 / 15
- Regions: 0 / 205
- Municipal councils: 1 / 2,432

Election symbol

Website
- nyeborgerlige.dk

Nye Borgerlige (NB, often translated as the New Right) (Note: No English word encapsulates the full meaning of the Danish singular borgerlig. It is the usual Danish term for non-socialist parties in general, and the country's right-of-centre parties in particular. Imperfect translations include 'bourgeois' or 'civic'. In English, the party's name is often loosely translated to the New Right despite the party not having an official English name.) is a national-conservative and right-wing populist political party in Denmark. Formed by Pernille Vermund and Peter Seier Christensen (Note: Svend Pedersen is also credited as a co-founder, but never played a central role in Nye Borgerlige, and quickly left the party again. In 2022 he rejoined as an active member and was elected to the party's national executive, but was expelled on 30 March 2023 for racist and derogatory remarks.) in 2015, it first entered the Folketing in 2019 with four seats (out of 179) and again in 2022 with six. After three defections in the first months after the election, by March 2023 the party's number of seats in the Folketing was reduced to three. The youth wing of the party was Nye Borgerliges Ungdom (NBU) until its dissolution in March 2024.

Having been chairman throughout its existence, Vermund resigned in January 2023. Lars Boje Mathiesen succeeded her in February but was expelled after just 30 days in office. With two MFs having left before then, Vermund took over again as de facto chairman, being officially reelected in October. In January 2024, she announced that she had left the party, recommending the dissolution of Nye Borgerlige to its national executive, and that the party's parliamentary group had dissolved itself. The national executive announced that it would make a plan for the party's dissolution. Several local party activists opposed the plan, however, and an extraordinary party conference in April 2024 decided to carry on the party, choosing Martin Henriksen as its new leader.

== History ==
=== Founding and outside the Folketing ===
On 24 September 2015, architect Pernille Vermund and chemical engineer Peter Seier Christensen announced that they were in the process of establishing a new political party with the working title "We Conservatives" (Vi Konservative), but instead settled on the name "Nye Borgerlige". Both founders were former members of the Conservative People's Party for which party Vermund had served as a Helsingør Municipality councilor from the 2009 municipal election until 2011. On 20 October 2015, they launched the party website and published a political program (principprogram). In an interview to B.T. on the same day, Vermund and Seier described their policies as "a mix of the Danish People's Party and the Liberal Alliance" and told that 360 people had joined. The party was founded in response to the then-government's handling of the 2015 European migrant crisis.

On 21 September 2016, the founders announced that they had gathered the 20,109 signatures – amounting to one 175th of valid votes cast at the previous general election – required to run in the next election. They held their first official press conference in Copenhagen one day later, notably emphasizing the party's three "non-negotiable demands" (ufravigelige krav) as a prerequisite for backing any government; these were a total asylum freeze, eviction of criminal foreigners after their first conviction, and that foreigners staying in Denmark must be able to support themselves. The party's eligibility to run was officially approved by the Ministry of the Interior on 6 October, when the party was assigned its requested election party letter D. In October, Progress Party stopped collecting signatures to support Nye Borgerlige because they "have taken over the Progress Party's old messages".

On 12 November 2016, Nye Borgerlige held its first annual party conference in Fredericia with about 400 attendees, while at the time reporting 2,773 members with nine municipal councillors quickly changed their party affiliation to it. Market research firm Gallup polled in November 2016 and determined that the party would primarily obtain its voters from the Danish People's Party. Running in 61 out of the 98 municipalities during the 2017 local elections, Nye Borgerlige secured 0.9% of the vote nationally, acquiring just one out of the 2,432 municipal councilors nationwide – the one awarded to incumbent councilor Mette Thiesen in Hillerød Municipality who had been elected for the Conservative People's Party in 2013.

=== 2019 general election ===
In the election campaign before the 2019 general election, Nye Borgerlige was unexpectedly challenged by the sudden emergence of the far-right party Stram Kurs, but at the election on 5 June, Nye Borgerlige obtained 2.4% of the vote, equal to four seats, whereby the party entered the Folketing, whereas Stram Kurs with 1.8% did not surpass the 2% threshold. NB's first parliamentary group consisted of Pernille Vermund (South Jutland), Peter Seier Christensen (Zealand), Mette Thiesen (North Zealand), and Lars Boje Mathiesen (East Jutland). As the majority in Parliament shifted to the left at the election, the leader of the Social Democrats Mette Frederiksen formed the same month a minority government (Frederiksen I) to which Nye Borgerlige would serve as an opposition party.

Early in the election period, the party decided against custom to invest most of its funds in communication and not policy development, in a ratio described as "80/20". Nye Borgerlige gained popularity and became well known for its successful social media strategy, especially on Facebook. In February 2021, it became, with officially 18,000 members, the Danish political party with the third highest membership count, succeeded only by the Social Democrats and Venstre. Two years later, however, newspaper accounts questioned the party's official membership counts, quoting several former party activists reporting that they were instructed not to remove people not paying membership fees from the membership lists in order to create a higher membership number.

In February 2021, the party got its highest single opinion poll to date, suggesting 11% of the general vote. After its initial surge in polling during the election period, the party's popularity began dwindling from early 2021 onwards, particularly following the launch of a new right-wing populist party named Denmark Democrats headed by former minister Inger Støjberg. The November 2021 local elections resulted in a nationwide performance of 3.6%, awarding the party 64 seats instead of the previous single one. In the June 2022 European Union opt-out referendum, Nye Borgerlige campaigned for a "no", with 66.9% of voters voting "yes".

=== 2022 general election and first Vermund resignation ===
Leading up to the general election, widespread dissatisfaction among local party members were in August reported in the media, in particular on Funen and Zealand, because of the centralised decision-making concerning the choice of parliamentary candidates, where the national executive chose the leading candidates regardless of local support. The top management led to defections from local councillors and other party activists. At the 2022 general election on 1 November, the party received 3.7% and won six seats as the four original MFs were re-elected in the same constituencies along with Mikkel Bjørn (Funen) and Kim Edberg Andersen (North Jutland). Thiesen left the party on 7 November due to an incident in which her boyfriend had exercised physical violence towards a member of Nye Borgerlige's secretariat, consequently becoming the fastest politician in Danish history to leave the party of their election. She would later join the Danish People's Party in February 2023.

In the aftermath of the election, Vermund faced internal critique for having made a campaign that was too vague and pragmatic, focusing on an excess of key issues and too little on immigration policy. Many party activists were also frustrated by the thorough top management of the party, and in particular the central hand-picking of parliamentary candidates. The press secretary for seven years, Lars Kaaber, was dismissed on 24 November. In December, a new grand coalition majority government headed by incumbent prime minister Frederiksen, consisting of the Social Democrats, Venstre, and the Moderates (the SVM government) took office, to which Nye Borgerlige served as opposition.

On 10 January 2023, Vermund issued a statement saying that she would step down as leader at the party's next annual conference and would not run for reelection to the Folketing. Vermund explained her resignation with a desire to get her "life and family back", later stating that she leading up to the decision had begun feeling ill. Most political observers pointed at Boje as her most likely successor as party leader, though some thought that Bjørn might also make a bid for the party leadership. The two were seen as representing the liberal and the national conservative wings in the party, respectively.

On 17 January, Boje announced his leadership candidacy, receiving support from Seier and Edberg but not Bjørn and Vermund, the latter having announced that she would abstain from commenting on the choice of her successor. A week later, Bjørn left Nye Borgerlige for the Danish People's Party, citing internal dissension with Boje and a lack of belief in his abilities to lead. In turn, Boje blamed Bjørn for putting himself before the party, whereas Vermund criticised Bjørn for leaving his post prematurely and taking his seat to another party, having been elected for Nye Borgerlige with the lowest personal number of votes of all the party's parliamentarians. Bjørn's defection was followed by those of the chairman and deputy chairman of the youth wing Nye Borgerliges Ungdom. In the end, no other candidates entered the race for chairman, ensuring Boje's unanimous election as party leader on 7 February.

=== Boje as chairman ===
Besides the election of Boje, the party conference on 7 February 2023 elected local councillor Henriette Ergemann as new political deputy leader by 204 out of the 317 delegates' votes, succeeding Seier who had announced his resignation in January. Ergemann had defeated six other candidates. However, after 13 days in the post, Ergemann resigned following criticism of a number of controversial statements by her about COVID-19 vaccines and political opponents. Ergemann left the party on 6 March, rejoining it in February 2024.

Some commentators predicted that the election of Boje would move the party towards a less pragmatic, less national conservative and more liberal and protest party-like position, though Boje himself stated that he would continue the political line of Vermund. However, on 10 March, only 31 days after his election, the party announced that the national executive had unanimously chosen to dismiss Boje as party leader and expel him from the party due to disputes over remuneration and campaign finances. The decision had been taken the evening of 9 March. Boje continued in the Folketing as an independent. As a concomitant of Boje's exit, the party was set to lose 3.5 million Danish kroner of its public funds, with effect after 12 months.

=== After Boje ===
Following the expulsion of Boje, Vermund conveyed her willingness to once again take over as party leader and to run in the next general election. From then until October, the party was formally led by collectively by its national executive headed by acting chairman Jesper Hammer, with Vermund as front figure and de facto chairman. In the first week after Boje's dismissal some 500 members left, amounting to around 2,000 defections in total since the 2022 generation election. From the local election in November 2021 until March 2023, the party lost 22 out of 64 municipal council members, including all in the four biggest Danish cities (Copenhagen, Aarhus, Aalborg, Odense).

In April, Seier called in sick with stress, effectively reducing Nye Borgerlige's number of active parliamentarians to two. (Note: In order to avoid his substitute Henriette Ergemann who had left the party from entering the Folketing, Seier decided, in accordance with law, to abstain from officially calling himself in sick and instead simply stopped attending work.) On 10 May, Vermund announced a more pragmatic strategy for the party, which included no longer insisting on its three main immigration policy demands as non-negotiable. According to Vermund, insisting on having these demands fulfilled as a prerequisite for supporting a right-wing government would not make sense given the parliamentary situation. On 13 October, Martin Henriksen, a former Danish People's Party MF who had joined Nye Borgerlige in June, was appointed its leading candidate for the 2024 European Parliament election. (Note: However, the party would ultimately not compete in that election.)

=== Vermund interlude and Henriksen as chairman ===
At the annual conference of the party on 28 October 2023, Vermund was again officially elected chairman. On 10 January 2024, Vermund surprisingly announced that she and Edberg had recommended the dissolution of the party to the national executive, and that they were as of then without party affiliation in parliament. The reason cited was an abundance of right-wing parties in parliament. On 16 January, the party's parliamentary group was formally dissolved, with Vermund joining the Liberal Alliance the subsequent day, whose chairman Alex Vanopslagh had before Christmas privately invited her to do so. Concurrently, many local party activists announced that they intended to continue the existence of the party, several of them pointing to Henriksen as a potential new party leader. Nye Borgerliges Ungdom dissolved itself on 3 March, while Edberg joined the Denmark Democrats on 19 March.

On 16 April, on an extraordinary party conference 172 delegates out of 185 voted in favour of continuing the party's existence, electing Henriksen by 169–3 against his opponent Daniel Fischer. As of that date, the party had 20 municipal councilors and two regions counselors remaining, while the membership in May was approximating 3,000 members. On 15 May 2024 both former acting chairmen Frederik Meyer and Jesper Hammer left the party.

=== After Henriksen ===
On 4 April, Henriksen announced he would be stepping down as party chairman and leaving politics. He was replaced by Susanne Borggaard, a local councilmember in Sorø Municipality.

In the local elections on 18 November 2025, the party was on the ballot in 17 municipalities, but secured only a single mandate in the election with the re-election of the Borggaard to the municipal council in Sorø Municipality.

== Party platform ==
According to Nye Borgerlige's 2015 manifesto, the party combines "a classically conservative value-based policy with a borgerlig economic policy and an unambiguous resistance towards conventions and supranational agreements limiting Danish democracy". It is in favour of Danish withdrawal from the EU, a liberal economic policy and a further tightening of immigration policy. The party's self-professed five main principles are:

- A strong cultural community of values
- Less state, more human
- Common responsibility for society's weakest
- Reasonable protection of natural values
- Freedom, democracy, and national sovereignty

The party is located on the right side of the political spectrum regarding both the distribution and value dimensions, and is considered the most right-wing party in the Danish Parliament Folketinget. The party has been described as national conservative, national liberal, right-wing populist, nationalist, libertarian on economic issues, anti-immigration, and anti-Islam. Although the party supports Danish NATO membership, in November 2023 it expressed opposition to additional funding for Ukraine in the Russo-Ukrainian War, describing Islamic immigration as a greater threat to European security.

== Election results ==
=== Parliament (Folketing) ===
A map of the 2022 general election, showing the vote share received by Nye Borgerlige in each nomination district and constituency

Election	Leader	Votes	%	Seats	+/–	Government
2019	Pernille Vermund	83,228	2.4 (#9)	4 / 179	New	Opposition
2022	Pernille Vermund	129,524	3.7 (#10)	6 / 179	▲2	Opposition

=== Local elections ===
Municipal elections

Date	Leader	Seats	
Date	Leader	#	±
2017	Pernille Vermund	1 / 2,432	New
2021	Pernille Vermund	64 / 2,436	▲63

Regional elections

Date	Leader	Seats	
Date	Leader	#	±
2017	Pernille Vermund	0 / 205	New
2021	Pernille Vermund	8 / 205	▲8

== Leadership ==
No.	Portrait	Leader	Took office	Left office	Time in office
1	Pernille Vermund	Pernille Vermund (born 1975)	19 October 2015	7 February 2023	7 years, 111 days
2	Lars Boje Mathiesen	Lars Boje Mathiesen (born 1975)	7 February 2023	9 March 2023	30 days
–	Jesper Hammer	Jesper Hammer (born 1969); Acting	9 March 2023	28 October 2023	233 days
(1)	Pernille Vermund	Pernille Vermund (born 1975)	28 October 2023	10 January 2024	74 days
–	Frederik Meyer Johannesen	Frederik Meyer Johannesen (born 1998); Acting	10 January 2024	16 April 2024	97 days
3	Martin Henriksen	Martin Henriksen (born 1980)	16 April 2024	27 April 2025	1 year, 11 days
4	Susanne Borggaard	Susanne Borggaard (born 1971)	27 April 2025	Incumbent	1 year, 185 days
