= Martin Henriksen (Danish politician) =

Danish politician

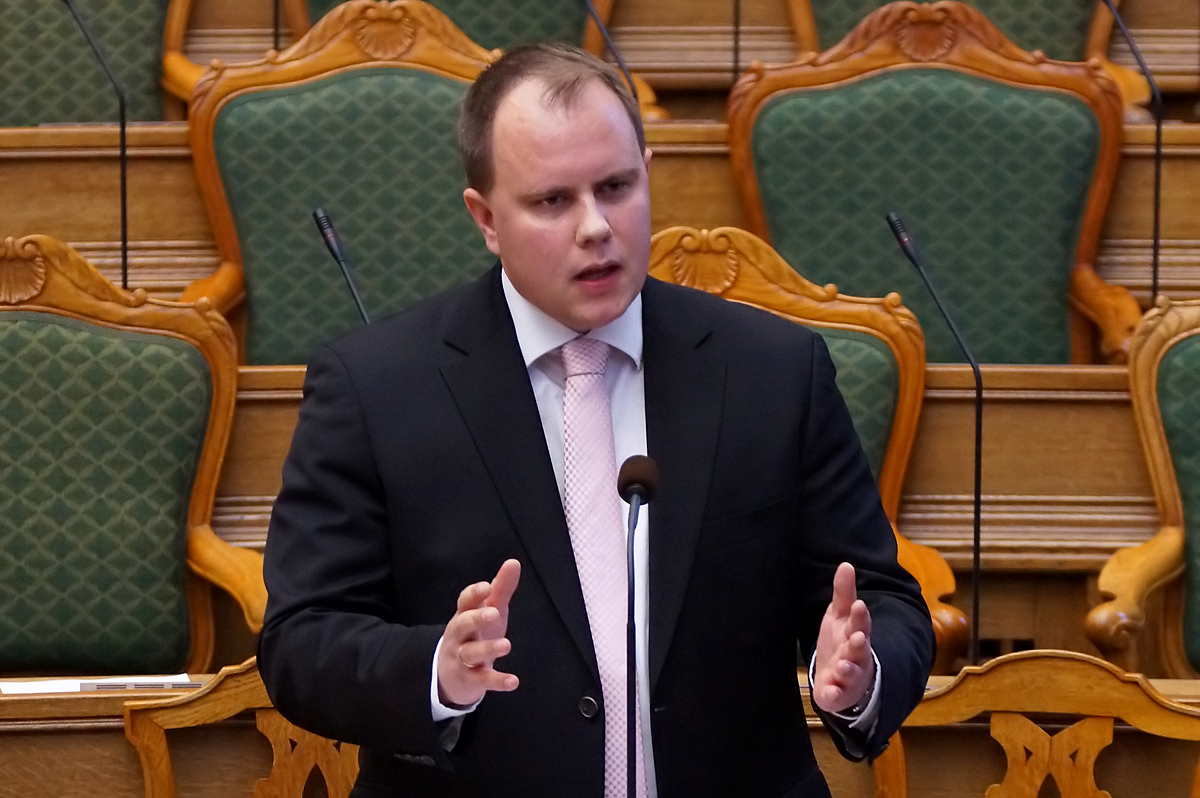
- Martin Henriksen

Leader of New Right
- In office 16 April 2024 – 27 April 2025
- Preceded by: Pernille Vermund
- Succeeded by: Susanne Borggaard

Member of the Folketing
- In office 8 February 2005 – 5 June 2019

Personal details
- Born: 25 January 1980 (age 46) Tårnby, Denmark
- Citizenship: Danish
- Party: New Right (since 2023)
- Other political affiliations: Danish People's (until 2022)
- Committees: Immigration and Integration Policy, Education, Defence Committee, the Greenland Committee, Schleswig Committee, the Faroe Islands Committee and the Council of Europe.
- Website: http://www.martinhenriksen.dk

Martin Henriksen (born 25 January 1980) is a former Danish politician who from April 2024 to April 2025 was leader of the New Right party. He served as a Member of the Folketing from 2005 to 2019, representing the Danish People's Party (Dansk Folkeparti). He was latterly a Member of the Folketing in the Greater Copenhagen constituency from 2007 until 2019, having previously been elected in 2005 for Western Copenhagen. He resigned from the Danish People's Party in 2022, after losing the election for party leadership. In 2023, he joined the New Right party.

== Political career ==
Henriksen is known as a strong critic of immigration policy in Denmark. In 2016 he claimed on his website that Islam "has since its inception been a terrorist movement".

Henriksen lost his seat in the Danish parliament Folketinget in the 2019 Danish general elections, but remained a member of the party's national executive committee until January 2022, when he unsuccessfully ran for the vacant post as party leader, losing to Morten Messerschmidt. In February 2022 he withdrew from the party national executive and a few days later left the Danish People's Party altogether.

On 13 June 2023, Henriksen joined the New Right (Nye Borgerlige) political party. After Pernille Vermund's surprising exit from that party in January 2024, Henriksen was elected as New Right's new party leader on an extraordinary party conference in April 2024.

He announced in April 2025 he was retiring from politics and would not run for reelection as party chair.
