= 2013 Danish local elections =

← 2009	19 November 2013	2017 →
- 98 municipal councils 5 regional councils
Party	Leader	Vote %	Seats	+/–
Social Democrats	Helle Thorning-Schmidt	29.5%	773	−28
Venstre	Lars Løkke Rasmussen	26.6%	767	+68
DPP	Kristian Thulesen Dahl	10.1%	255	+69
Conservatives	Lars Barfoed	8.6%	205	−57
Red–Green	J. Schmidt-Nielsen (Note: political spokesperson)	6.9%	119	+105
SF	Annette Vilhelmsen	5.6%	116	−224
Social Liberals	Margrethe Vestager	4.8%	62	+12
Liberal Alliance	Anders Samuelsen	2.9%	33	+32
Schleswig Party	Carsten Leth Schmidt	0.3%	9	+3
Chr. Democrats	Stig Grenov	0.5%	6	0
Other		3.8%	99	−4
This lists parties that won seats. See the complete results below.

Local elections were held on 19 November 2013 in Denmark's 98 municipal councils, contesting 2,444 seats (previous election: 2,468 seats) for the 2014–2017 term of office, and in five regional councils, contesting 205 seats for the 2014–2017 term. Advance voting began on 20 August 2013 in national registration offices in Denmark, hospitals, prisons, etc. Twelve women held the highest political office of mayor in the municipalities in the 2014–2017 term of office.

== Results ==
=== Results of regional elections ===
The Ministry of Economy and Interior stated that voter turnout was 71.7%. The regions are not municipalities, and are not allowed to levy any taxes, but are financed only through block grants from the central government and the municipalities within each region.

==== Number of councillors and political parties in the regional councils ====
Party		Seats	Change
A	Social Democrats (Socialdemokraterne)	67	▼1
V	Venstre (Venstre)	62	▲8
O	Danish People's Party (Dansk Folkeparti)	23	▲4
C	Conservative People's Party (Konservative Folkeparti)	15	▼5
Ø	Red-Green Alliance (Enhedslisten)	15	▲13
F	Socialist People's Party (Socialistisk Folkeparti)	10	▼22
B	Danish Social Liberal Party (Radikale Venstre)	8	▲1
I	Liberal Alliance (Liberal Alliance)	5	▲5
Total		205	

==== Old and new chairs of the regional councils ====
Regional Council Chairmen Outgoing and Incoming
Region	Incumbent Chair	Elected Chair
North Denmark Region	Ulla Astman	Ulla Astman
Central Denmark Region	Bent Hansen	Bent Hansen
Region of Southern Denmark	Carl Holst	Carl Holst
Region Zealand	Steen Bach Nielsen	Jens Stenbæk
Capital Region of Denmark	Vibeke Storm Rasmussen	Sophie Hæstorp Andersen

On 22 June 2015, Stephanie Lose became chairman of the Region of Southern Denmark. She is from Venstre. Carl Holst became a minister in the government of Denmark.

=== Results of municipal elections ===
The Ministry of Economy and Interior stated that voter turnout was 71.9%. 2,444 councillors were elected.

==== Number of councillors and political parties in the municipal councils ====
Sum of 98 local elections
Party		Share of vote		Seats	
Party		Percent	Change	Number	Change
A	Social Democrats (Socialdemokraterne)	29.5 %	-1.1 %	773	▼28
V	Venstre (Venstre)	26.6 %	+1.8 %	767	▲68
O	Danish People's Party (Dansk Folkeparti)	10.1 %	+2.0 %	255	▲69
C	Conservative People's Party (Konservative Folkeparti)	8.6 %	-2.4 %	205	▼57
Ø	Red-Green Alliance (Enhedslisten)	6.9 %	+4.6 %	119	▲105
F	Socialist People's Party (Socialistisk Folkeparti)	5.6 %	-8.9 %	116	▼224
B	Danish Social Liberal Party (Radikale Venstre)	4.8 %	+1.1 %	62	▲12
I	Liberal Alliance (Liberal Alliance)	2.9 %	+2.6 %	33	▲32
S	Schleswig Party (Slesvigsk Parti)	0.3%	+0.1%	9	▲3
K	Christian Democrats (Kristendemokraterne)	0.5%	+0.1%	6	Steady
	Others	3.8 %	-0.25 %	99	▼6
Total				2,444	▼24

Local Political Parties in the Municipal Councils
Party	Municipality	Seats
Citizens' List (Borgerlisten)	Kerteminde	6
Gulborgsund List (Guldborgsundlisten)	Guldborgsund	6
Common List (Fælleslisten)	Ikast-Brande	5
Citizens' List (Borgerlisten)	Faxe	4
Citizens' List Langeland (Borgerlisten Langeland)	Langeland	4
Democratic Balance (Demokratisk Balance)	Morsø	4
Local List (Lokallisten)	Rudersdal	4
NewGribskov (NytGribskov)	Gribskov	4
Cross-Political Community (Tværpolitisk Forening)	Dragør	3
Hvidovre List (Hvidovrelisten)	Hvidovre	3
Resident List (Beboerlisten)	Randers	3
Social Common List – Rebild (Den Sociale Fællesliste – Rebild)	Rebild	3
Catchment List (Oplandslisten)	Rebild	2
Citizens' List (Borgerlisten)	Brønderslev	2
Citizens' List Norddjurs (Borgerlisten Norddjurs)	Norddjurs	2
Common List (Fælleslisten)	Hillerød	2
Common List (Fælleslisten)	Sønderborg	2
Environment List (Miljølisten)	Fanø	2
Land Owners (Grundejerne)	Solrød	2
Local List (Lokallisten)	Hjørring	2
Læsø List (Læsø List)	Læsø	2
New Allerød (Det Nye Allerød)	Allerød	2
Odsherred List (Odsherred Listen)	Odsherred	2
Ærø's Future (Ærøs Fremtid)	Ærø	2
Ærø Plus (Ærø Plus)	Ærø	2
Amager List (Amagerlisten)	Dragør	1
Blovstrød List (Blovstrød Listen)	Allerød	1
Bornholm List (Bornholmerlisten)	Bornholm	1
Citizens' List (Borgerlisten)	Billund	1
Citizens' List (Borgerlisten)	Syddjurs	1
Citizens' List Frederikssund (Borgernes Liste Frederikssund)	Frederikssund	1
Citizens' List in Hørsholm (Borgerlisten i Hørsholm)	Hørsholm	1
Citizens' List Jammerbugten (Borgerlisten Jammerbugten)	Jammerbugt	1
Citizens' Voice (Borgernes Stemme)	Fredensborg	1
Cooperation List (Samarbejdslisten)	Læsø	1
Cross-Socialist List in Svendborg (Tværsocialistisk Liste i Svendborg)	Svendborg	1
Fanø Local List (Fanø Lokalliste)	Fanø	1
Fjord List (Fjordlisten)	Ringkøbing-Skjern	1
Havdrup List (Havdruplisten)	Solrød	1
Local Democrats (Lokaldemokraterne)	Helsingør	1
Local List Lolland (Lokallisten Lolland)	Lolland	1
Læsø Citizens' List (Læsø Borgerliste)	Læsø	1
New Centrum (Ny Centrum)	Køge	1
North Funen List (Nordfynslisten)	Nordfyn	1
Common List Samsø (Fælleslisten Samsø)	Samsø	1
Southern Funen's List (Sydfyns Borgerliste)	Faaborg-Midtfyn	1
Stevns List (Stevnslisten)	Stevns	1
Svendborg Local List (Svendborg Lokalliste)	Svendborg	1
Welfare List (Velfærdslisten)	Randers	1
Total		99

==== Mayors in the municipalities ====
The mayors (Danish: borgmester; plural: borgmestre) of the 98 municipalities head the council meetings and are the chairmen of the finance committee in each of their respective municipalities. Only in Copenhagen, this mayor – the head of the finance committee and council meetings – is called the lord mayor (Danish: overborgmester). Mette Touborg is the mayor of Lejre Municipality since 1 January 2010. She is the only one at present from the Socialist People's Party to hold the highest political post in a municipality. Rebild Municipality has a new mayor since 1 January 2014, Leon Sebbelin from the Danish Social Liberal Party. Tobias Birch Johansen, the mayor of Læsø Municipality, is a member of the agrarian liberal Venstre, but he is elected on the local list Læsø Listen.

Mayors after the election
Party	Number	Change
Venstre	48	▲17
Social Democrats	33	▼16
Conservative People's Party	13	▲1
Local parties	2	▼2
Danish Social Liberal Party	1	▲1
Socialist People's Party	1	▼1

=== Old and new mayors in the municipalities ===
The term of office for the mayors elected by the majority of councillors among its members in each municipal council is the same as for the councils elected, namely 1 January 2014 until 31 December 2017. The correct name for the municipality on the somewhat remote island of Bornholm is regional municipality because the municipality also handles tasks not carried out by the other Danish municipalities but by the regions. As just one example, as the only one of the 46 municipalities in eastern Denmark it is a 100% owner of its own public mass transit agency called BAT, formerly Bornholms Amts Trafikselskab. The public traffic agency of the other 45 municipalities in eastern Denmark is Movia, owned by the Capital Region of Denmark, Region Zealand and the 45 municipalities.

Mayors outgoing and incoming
Municipality	Incumbent mayor	Elected mayor
Albertslund Municipality	Steen Christiansen	Steen Christiansen
Allerød Municipality	Erik Lund	Jørgen Johansen
Assens Municipality	Finn Brunse	Søren Steen Andersen
Ballerup Municipality	Jesper Würtzen	Jesper Würtzen
Billund Municipality	Ib Kristensen	Ib Kristensen
Bornholm Regional Municipality	Winni Grosbøll	Winni Grosbøll
Brøndby Municipality	Ib Terp	Ib Terp
Brønderslev Municipality	Lene Hansen	Mikael Klitgaard
Copenhagen Municipality	Frank Jensen	Frank Jensen
Dragør Municipality	Allan Holst	Eik Dahl Bidstrup
Egedal Municipality	Willy Eliasen	Willy Eliasen
Esbjerg Municipality	Johnny Søtrup	Johnny Søtrup
Fanø Municipality	Erik Nørreby	Erik Nørreby
Favrskov Municipality	Nils Borring	Nils Borring
Faxe Municipality	Knud Erik Hansen	Knud Erik Hansen
Fredensborg Municipality	Thomas Lykke Pedersen	Thomas Lykke Pedersen
Fredericia Municipality	Kenny Bruun Olsen	Jacob Bjerregaard
Frederiksberg Municipality	Jørgen Glenthøj	Jørgen Glenthøj
Frederikshavn Municipality	Lars Møller	Birgit Stenbak Hansen
Frederikssund Municipality	Ole Find Jensen	John Schmidt Andersen
Furesø Municipality	Ole Bondo Christensen	Ole Bondo Christensen
Faaborg-Midtfyn Municipality	Hans Jørgensen	Christian Thygesen
Gentofte Municipality	Hans Toft	Hans Toft
Gladsaxe Municipality	Karin Søjberg Holst	Karin Søjberg Holst
Glostrup Municipality	John Engelhardt	John Engelhardt
Greve Municipality	Hans Barlach	Pernille Beckmann
Gribskov Municipality	Jan Ferdinandsen	Kim Valentin
Guldborgsund Municipality	John Brædder	John Brædder
Haderslev Municipality	Jens Christian Gjesing	H.P. Geil
Halsnæs Municipality	Helge Friis	Steen Hasselriis
Hedensted Municipality	Kirsten Terkilsen	Kirsten Terkilsen
Helsingør Municipality	Johannes Hecht Nielsen	Benedikte Kiær
Herlev Municipality	Thomas Gyldal Petersen	Thomas Gyldal Petersen
Herning Municipality	Lars Krarup	Lars Krarup
Hillerød Municipality	Kirsten Jensen	Dorte Meldgaard
Hjørring Municipality	Arne Boelt	Arne Boelt
Holbæk Municipality	Søren Kjærsgaard	Søren Kjærsgaard
Holstebro Municipality	H.C. Østerby	H.C. Østerby
Horsens Municipality	Peter Sørensen	Peter Sørensen
Hvidovre Municipality	Helle Moesgaard Adelborg	Helle Moesgaard Adelborg
Høje-Taastrup Municipality	Michael Ziegler	Michael Ziegler
Hørsholm Municipality	Morten Slotved	Morten Slotved
Ikast-Brande Municipality	Carsten Kissmeyer	Carsten Kissmeyer
Ishøj Municipality	Ole Bjørstorp	Ole Bjørstorp
Jammerbugt Municipality	Mogens Gade	Mogens Gade
Kalundborg Municipality	Martin Damm	Martin Damm
Kerteminde Municipality	Sonja Rasmussen	Hans Luunbjerg
Kolding Municipality	Jørn Pedersen	Jørn Pedersen
Køge Municipality	Marie Stærke	Flemming Christensen
Langeland Municipality	Bjarne Nielsen	Bjarne Nielsen
Lejre Municipality	Mette Touborg	Mette Touborg
Lemvig Municipality	Erik Flyvholm	Erik Flyvholm
Lolland Municipality	Stig Vestergaard	Holger Schou Rasmussen
Lyngby-Taarbæk Municipality	Søren P. Rasmussen	Sofia Osmani
Læsø Municipality	Thomas W. Olsen	Tobias Birch Johansen
Mariagerfjord Municipality	H.C. Maarup	Mogens Jespersen
Middelfart Municipality	Steen Dahlstrøm	Steen Dahlstrøm
Morsø Municipality	Lauge Larsen	Hans Ejner Bertelsen
Norddjurs Municipality	Jan Petersen	Jan Petersen
Nordfyn Municipality	Morten Andersen	Morten Andersen
Nyborg Municipality	Erik Christensen	Kenneth Muhs
Næstved Municipality	Carsten Rasmussen	Carsten Rasmussen
Odder Municipality	Elvin J. Hansen	Uffe Jensen
Odense Municipality	Anker Boye	Anker Boye
Odsherred Municipality	Thomas Adelskov	Thomas Adelskov
Randers Municipality	Henning Jensen Nyhuus	Claus Omann Jensen
Rebild Municipality	Anny Winther	Leon Sebbelin
Ringkøbing-Skjern Municipality	Iver Enevoldsen	Iver Enevoldsen
Ringsted Municipality	Niels Ulrich Hermansen	Henrik Hvidesten
Roskilde Municipality	Joy Mogensen	Joy Mogensen
Rudersdal Municipality	Jens Ive	Jens Ive
Rødovre Municipality	Erik Nielsen	Erik Nielsen
Samsø Municipality	Jørn Nissen	Marcel Meijer
Silkeborg Municipality	Hanne Bæk Olsen	Steen Vindum
Skanderborg Municipality	Jørgen Gaarde	Jørgen Gaarde
Skive Municipality	Flemming Eskildsen	Peder Chr. Kirkegaard
Slagelse Municipality	Lis Tribler	Sten Knuth
Solrød Municipality	Niels Emil Hörup	Niels Emil Hörup
Sorø Municipality	Ivan Hansen	Gert Jørgensen
Stevns Municipality	Poul Arne Nielsen	Mogens Haugaard Nielsen
Struer Municipality	Niels Viggo Lynghøj	Mads Jakobsen
Svendborg Municipality	Curt Sørensen	Lars Erik Hornemann
Syddjurs Municipality	Kirstine Bille	Claus Wistoft
Sønderborg Municipality	Aase Nyegaard	Erik Lauritzen
Thisted Municipality	Lene Kjelgaard Jensen	Lene Kjelgaard Jensen
Tønder Municipality	Laurids Rudebæk	Laurids Rudebæk
Tårnby Municipality	Henrik Zimino	Henrik Zimino
Vallensbæk Municipality	Henrik Rasmussen	Henrik Rasmussen
Varde Municipality	Gylling Haahr	Erik Buhl
Vejen Municipality	Egon Fræhr	Egon Fræhr
Vejle Municipality	Arne Sigtenbjerggaard	Arne Sigtenbjerggaard
Vesthimmerland Municipality	Knud Vældgaard Kristensen	Knud Vældgaard Kristensen
Viborg Municipality	Søren Pape Poulsen	Søren Pape Poulsen
Vordingborg Municipality	Henrik Holmer	Knud Larsen
Ærø Municipality	Karsten Landro	Jørgen Otto Jørgensen
Aabenraa Municipality	Tove Larsen	Thomas Andresen
Aalborg Municipality	Henning G. Jensen	Thomas Kastrup Larsen
Aarhus Municipality	Jacob Bundsgaard	Jacob Bundsgaard
