= Southern Funen's List =

Southern Funen's List Sydfyns Borgerliste
- Leader: Jan Valbak
- Headquarters: Valdemarsgade 17 D 5700 Svendborg
- Ideology: Regionalism
- Regions: 0 / 205
- Municipal councils: 0 / 2,432

Southern Funen's List (Danish: Sydfyns Borgerliste) is a regional political party set in the municipalities on the southern parts of Funen, more specifically Faaborg-Midtfyn and Svendborg.

== History ==
In 2005 and 2009, Southern Funen's List ran in Svendborg, Gudme and Egebjerg Municipality. After a fairly poor election in 2009, the party was dissolved.

In 2013, Jan Valbak, Palle Petersen and Palle Andersen re-founded the party, this time with more focus on Faaborg. The party received 1.505 votes, ensuring them a seat in the municipal council.

The name of the party was changed to Borgerlisten in the 2017 election, where the party did not receive enough votes for a seat in the municipal council.

== Politicians from Southern Funen's List ==
- Leif Nybo: Former chairman.
- Jan Valbak: Co-founder and current chairman.
- Palle Petersen: Co-founder.
- Palle Andersen: Co-founder.

== Election results ==
=== Municipal elections ===
Date	Votes	Seats	
Date	Votes	#	±
2005	1.168	1 / 2,522	New
2009	579	0 / 2,468	▼1
2013	1.505	1 / 2,444	▲1
2017	718	0 / 2,432	▼1
