= 2017 Danish local elections =

- 21 November 2017
- 98 municipal councils 5 regional councils
Party	Leader	Vote %	Seats	+/–
Social Democrats	Mette Frederiksen	32.5%	842	+69
Venstre	Lars Løkke Rasmussen	23.1%	688	−79
Conservatives	Søren Pape Poulsen	8.8%	225	+20
DPP	Kristian Thulesen Dahl	8.8%	221	−34
SF	Pia Olsen Dyhr	5.7%	126	+10
Red–Green	Pernille Skipper (Note: political spokesperson)	6.0%	102	−17
Social Liberals	Morten Østergaard	4.6%	80	+18
Liberal Alliance	Anders Samuelsen	2.6%	28	−5
The Alternative	Uffe Elbæk	3.0%	20	New
Schleswig Party	Carsten Leth Schmidt	0.3%	10	+1
Chr. Democrats	Stig Grenov	0.5%	9	+3
New Right	Pernille Vermund	0.9%	1	New
Other		3.2%	78	−21
This lists parties that won seats. See the complete results below.

Local elections were held on 21 November 2017 for Denmark's 98 municipal councils and five regional councils. All 2,432 seats were contested for the 2018–21 term of office, together with 205 seats (a fixed number of 41 seats in each council) in five regional councils. In the previous election, there were 2,444 seats in the municipal councils.

== Results ==
=== Results of regional elections ===
The Danish ministry of economy and interior informed that voter turnout was 70.6%. 3,074,840 cast their votes. They voted for 205 seats in the five regional councils. This number remains unchanged since the first elections for the regional councils in the newly created regions, which were set up 1 January 2007 after the 13 counties were abolished. The regions are not municipalities, but are financed only through block grants paid by the central government and their constituent municipalities.

==== Number of councillors and political parties in the Regional Councils ====
Party		Seats	Change
A	Social Democrats (Socialdemokraterne)	70	▲3
V	Venstre (Venstre)	54	▼8
O	Danish People's Party (Dansk Folkeparti)	21	▼2
C	Conservative People's Party (Konservative Folkeparti)	15	0
F	Socialist People's Party (Socialistisk Folkeparti)	15	▲5
Ø	Red-Green Alliance (Enhedslisten)	12	▼3
B	Danish Social Liberal Party (Radikale Venstre)	8	0
I	Liberal Alliance (Liberal Alliance)	5	0
Å	The Alternative (Alternativet)	3	New
K	Christian Democrats (Kristendemokraterne)	1	▲1
	Others	1	▲1
Total		205	

==== Old and new Chairmen of the Regional Councils ====
Regional Council Chairmen Outgoing and Incoming
Region	Incumbent Chairman	Elected Chairman
North Denmark Region	Ulla Astman	Ulla Astman
Central Denmark Region	Bent Hansen	Anders Kühnau
Region of Southern Denmark	Stephanie Lose	Stephanie Lose
Region Zealand	Jens Stenbæk	Heino Knudsen
Capital Region of Denmark	Sophie Hæstorp Andersen	Sophie Hæstorp Andersen

=== Results of municipal elections ===
The Danish ministry of economy and interior informed that voter turnout was 70.8%. 3,226,558 cast their votes. They voted for 2432 seats in the 98 municipal councils, a reduction of 12 seats from 2444 after the previous election. The total countrywide number of seats in the municipal councils can be seen here and on the pages of the previous elections. They can be accessed from the template at the bottom of the pages.

==== Number of councillors and political parties in the Municipal Councils ====
Sum of 98 local elections
Party		Share of vote		Seats	
Party		Percent	Change	Number	Change
A	Social Democrats (Socialdemokraterne)	32.45%	+2.94%	842	▲69
V	Venstre (Venstre)	23.06%	-3.56%	688	▼78
C	Conservative People's Party (Konservative Folkeparti)	8.78%	+0.23%	225	▲20
O	Danish People's Party (Dansk Folkeparti)	8.75%	-1.37%	221	▼34
F	Socialist People's Party (Socialistisk Folkeparti)	5.7%	+0.1%	126	▲10
Ø	Red-Green Alliance (Enhedslisten)	5.96%	-0.98%	102	▼17
B	Danish Social Liberal Party (Radikale Venstre)	4.6%	-0.2%	80	▲18
I	Liberal Alliance (Liberal Alliance)	2.6%	-0.3%	28	▼5
Å	The Alternative (Alternativet)	3.0%	New	20	New
S	Schleswig Party (Slesvigsk Parti)	0.3%	+0.0%	10	▲1
K	Christian Democrats (Kristendemokraterne)	0.5%	+0.0%	9	▲3
D	The New Right (Nye Borgerlige)	0.9%	New	1	New
	Others	3.2%	-0.6%	78	▼21
Total				2,432	▼12

Local Political Parties in the Municipal Councils
Party	Municipality	Seats
Gulborgsund List (Guldborgsundlisten)	Guldborgsund	11
NewGribskov (NytGribskov)	Gribskov	6
Cross-Political Community (Tværpolitisk Forening)	Dragør	4
Social Common List (Den Sociale Fællesliste)	Rebild	4
Local List (Lokallisten)	Holbæk	3
Local List (Lokallisten)	Rudersdal	3
Citizens' List (Borgerlisten)	Billund	2
Citizens' List (Borgerlisten)	Brønderslev	2
Citizens' List (Borgerlisten)	Faxe	2
Common List (Fælleslisten)	Ikast-Brande	2
Fanø Local List (Fanø Lokalliste)	Fanø	2
Hvidovre List (Hvidovrelisten)	Hvidovre	2
New Stevns (Nyt Stevns)	Stevns	2
Local List (Lokallisten)	Hjørring	2
Local List 2017 (Lokallisten 2017)	Varde	2
Local List Lolland (Lokallisten Lolland)	Lolland	2
Læsø List (Læsø Listen)	Læsø	2
Skive List (Skive-Listen)	Skive	2
Your Voice (Din Stemme)	Lolland	2
Blovstrød List (Blovstrød Listen)	Allerød	1
Bornholm List (Bornholmerlisten)	Bornholm	1
Citizens' List (Borgerlisten)	Esbjerg	1
Citizens' List (Borgerlisten)	Kerteminde	1
Citizens' List (Borgerlisten)	Tønder	1
Common List (Fælleslisten)	Sønderborg	1
Democratic Balance (Demokratisk Balance)	Morsø	1
Fjord List (Fjordlisten)	Ringkøbing-Skjern	1
Havdrup List (Havdruplisten)	Solrød	1
Land Owners (Grundejerne)	Solrød	1
Local Democrats (Lokaldemokraterne)	Helsingør	1
Local List Høje-Taastrup (Lokallisten Høje-Taastrup)	Høje-Taastrup	1
Environment List (Miljølisten)	Fanø	1
Odsherred List (Odsherred Listen)	Odsherred	1
Our Allerød (Vores Allerød)	Allerød	1
Resident List (Beboerlisten)	Randers	1
Vesthimmerland List (VestHimmerlandsListen)	Vesthimmerland	1
Welfare List (Velfærdslisten)	Randers	1
Your Jammerbugt – Your Citizens' List (Dit Jammerbugt – Din Borgerliste)	Jammerbugt	1
Ærø's Future (Ærøs Fremtid)	Ærø	1
Ærø Plus (Ærø Plus)	Ærø	1
Total		78

==== The new municipal councils ====
Each municipal council consists of 9-55 seats, distributed over twelve established parties and a number of local parties.

Municipality	A	B	C	D	F	I	K	O	S	V	Ø	Å	L	Total Seats
Aabenraa Municipality	9		2		1			5	2	11	1			31
Aalborg Municipality	17	1	1					2		8	2			31
Aarhus Municipality	13	2	1		3	1		2		6	2	1		31
Albertslund Municipality	9	1	2		2			3		1	2	1		21
Allerød Municipality	5	1	5		2					5	1		2	21
Assens Municipality	8	1	1		2			3		13	1			29
Ballerup Municipality	16		1		1			2		3	2			25
Billund Municipality	7	2	1					3		10			2	25
Bornholm Municipality	8				1		1	4		5	2	1	1	23
Brøndby Municipality	11	1			1			3		2	1			19
Brønderslev Municipality	11		2					2		10			2	27
Dragør Municipality	3		3					2		3			4	15
Egedal Municipality	6	3	2		1	1		2		6				21
Esbjerg Municipality	11	1	1		2			3		11	1		1	31
Fanø Municipality	1		2		1					3		1	3	11
Favrskov Municipality	11		2		1			1		9	1			25
Faxe Municipality	8		1		1	1		4		7	1		2	25
Fredensborg Municipality	10	3	2		1	1		2		7	1			27
Fredericia Municipality	13							3		4	1			21
Frederiksberg Municipality	4	3	11		1	1				1	3	1		25
Frederikshavn Municipality	18		1		1			2		6	1			29
Frederikssund Municipality	8	1	1		1			2		9	1			23
Furesø Municipality	10	1	3			1		1		4	1			21
Faaborg-Midtfyn Municipality	8	2	1		1			4		7	1	1		25
Gentofte Municipality	2	1	13		1					1	1			19
Gladsaxe Municipality	10	2	1		2			2		5	3			25
Glostrup Municipality	7		1		1			2		7	1			19
Greve Municipality	7		1			1		2		9	1			21
Gribskov Municipality	5		2					2		7	1		6	23
Guldborgsund Municipality	6				1			7		3	1		11	29
Haderslev Municipality	10	1	1		1	2		4	1	9	2			31
Halsnæs Municipality	10				2			2		6	1			21
Hedensted Municipality	8				1	1	1	4		12				27
Helsingør Municipality	8	1	9		1			2		1	2		1	25
Herlev Municipality	12		2		1			1		1	2			19
Herning Municipality	5	1	2		1		1	1		19	1			31
Hillerød Municipality	9	2	1	1	2			1		10	1			27
Hjørring Municipality	15		3		1			2		7	1		2	31
Holbæk Municipality	9	3	1		1	2		4		6	2		3	31
Holstebro Municipality	12	2	1		1			2		9				27
Horsens Municipality	13		1		1	1		3		7	1			27
Hvidovre Municipality	8		2		3			3		2	1		2	21
Høje-Taastrup Municipality	5	1	12					1			1		1	21
Hørsholm Municipality	3	1	8			1		1		5				19
Ikast-Brande Municipality	6		3					3		9			2	23
Ishøj Municipality	11				2			2		3	1			19
Jammerbugt Municipality	9				1			2		14			1	27
Kalundborg Municipality	8	1			1			5		11	1			27
Kerteminde Municipality	7	1	7		2			3		3	1		1	25
Kolding Municipality	5	1			2			3		13	1			25
Copenhagen Municipality	15	5	3		5	2		3		5	11	6		55
Køge Municipality	10		4		3	1		2		6	1			27
Langeland Municipality	3		1		6			1		4				15
Lejre Municipality	6	1	2		5			2		8	1			25
Lemvig Municipality	4	1	1		2			1		12				21
Lolland Municipality	11				1			3		5	1		4	25
Lyngby-Taarbæk Municipality	4	2	10		2					2	1			21
Læsø Municipality	1							2		4			2	9
Mariagerfjord Municipality	11	1	1		1			3		12				29
Middelfart Municipality	14		1		1			2		6	1			25
Morsø Municipality	6							2		12			1	21
Norddjurs Municipality	11		2		2	2		3		6	1			27
Nordfyn Municipality	7		1		2			2		13				25
Nyborg Municipality	9				1			2		13				25
Næstved Municipality	13	2	2		1			2		9	2			31
Odder Municipality	5	1	2		1			1		7	2			19
Odense Municipality	13	1	3		1			2		6	2	1		29
Odsherred Municipality	12	1			1			2		7	1		1	25
Randers Municipality	13	1	1		1			3		9	1		2	31
Rebild Municipality	5	3	3					2		8			4	25
Ringkøbing-Skjern Municipality	6				3		6	2		11			1	29
Ringsted Municipality	5	1	3		1			3		6	2			21
Roskilde Municipality	16	1	2		1			3		6	2			31
Rudersdal Municipality	4	2	4			1				8	1		3	23
Rødovre Municipality	11		3		1			1		1	2			19
Samsø Municipality	5		2		1					3				11
Silkeborg Municipality	10	1	1		2	1		2		11	2	1		31
Skanderborg Municipality	11	2	1		2			3		8	1	1		29
Skive Municipality	9	1			2			2		11			2	27
Slagelse Municipality	12	1			2	1		4		10	1			31
Solrød Municipality	4	1	1		1	1		1		8			2	19
Sorø Municipality	8	1	7		1			3		3	1	1		25
Stevns Municipality	6	1	2					2		4	2		2	19
Struer Municipality	8	1	1		2			1		8				21
Svendborg Municipality	10	2	2		1			4		6	3	1		29
Syddjurs Municipality	8	1	1		4			3		8	1	1		27
Sønderborg Municipality	15							3	5	7			1	31
Thisted Municipality	9		5		1	1		3		6	1	1		27
Tønder Municipality	6		1		1	1		3	2	15	1		1	31
Tårnby Municipality	8	1	2		1			3		3	1			19
Vallensbæk Municipality	5		8					2						15
Varde Municipality	6	1	1			1			2	12			2	25
Vejen Municipality	8		4		1	1		2		10	1			27
Vejle Municipality	11	1	2		3	1		3		10				31
Vesthimmerland Municipality	7		7		2			2		8			1	27
Viborg Municipality	9		7		2			2		10	1			31
Vordingborg Municipality	13	1	1		1			3		8	1	1		29
Ærø Municipality	4		3		1			2		3			2	15

==== Mayors in the municipalities ====
The mayors (Danish: Borgmester; plural: Borgmestre) of the 98 municipalities heads the council meetings and is the chairman of the finance committee in each of their respective municipalities. Only in Copenhagen, this mayor – the head of the finance committee and council meetings – is called the Lord Mayor (Danish: Overborgmester). The final decision on who would be mayor had to be made by the municipal councils no later than Friday, 15 December 2017.

Mayors after the election
Party	Number	Change
Social Democrats	47	▲14
Venstre	37	▼11
Conservative People's Party	8	▼5
Local parties	2	Steady
Danish Social Liberal Party	1	Steady
Socialist People's Party	1	Steady
Danish People's Party	1	▲1
The Alternative	1	New

=== Old and new mayors in the municipalities ===
The term of office for the mayors elected by the majority of councillors among its members in each municipal council is the same as for the councils elected, namely 1 January 2018 until 31 December 2021. The municipality on the somewhat remote island of Bornholm is called a Regional Municipality, because the municipality also handles several tasks not carried out by the other Danish municipalities but by the regions.

Mayors outgoing and incoming
Municipality	Incumbent mayor	Elected mayor
Albertslund Municipality	Steen Christiansen	Steen Christiansen
Allerød Municipality	Jørgen Johansen	Karsten Längerich
Assens Municipality	Søren Steen Andersen	Søren Steen Andersen
Ballerup Municipality	Jesper Würtzen	Jesper Würtzen
Billund Municipality	Ib Kristensen	Ib Kristensen
Bornholm Regional Municipality	Winni Grosbøll	Winni Grosbøll
Brøndby Municipality	Kent Max Magelund	Kent Max Magelund
Brønderslev Municipality	Mikael Klitgaard	Mikael Klitgaard
Copenhagen Municipality	Frank Jensen	Frank Jensen
Dragør Municipality	Eik Dahl Bidstrup	Eik Dahl Bidstrup
Egedal Municipality	Karsten Søndergaard	Karsten Søndergaard
Esbjerg Municipality	Johnny Søtrup	Jesper Frost
Fanø Municipality	Erik Nørreby	Sofie Valbjørn
Favrskov Municipality	Nils Borring	Nils Borring
Faxe Municipality	Knud Erik Hansen	Ole Vive
Fredensborg Municipality	Thomas Lykke Pedersen	Thomas Lykke Pedersen
Fredericia Municipality	Jacob Bjerregaard	Jacob Bjerregaard
Frederiksberg Municipality	Jørgen Glenthøj	Jørgen Glenthøj
Frederikshavn Municipality	Birgit Stenbak Hansen	Birgit Stenbak Hansen
Frederikssund Municipality	John Schmidt Andersen	John Schmidt Andersen
Furesø Municipality	Ole Bondo Christensen	Ole Bondo Christensen
Faaborg-Midtfyn Municipality	Christian Thygesen	Hans Stavnsager
Gentofte Municipality	Hans Toft	Hans Toft
Gladsaxe Municipality	Trine Græse	Trine Græse
Glostrup Municipality	John Engelhardt	John Engelhardt
Greve Municipality	Pernille Beckmann	Pernille Beckmann
Gribskov Municipality	Kim Valentin	Anders Gerner Frost
Guldborgsund Municipality	John Brædder	John Brædder
Haderslev Municipality	H.P. Geil	H.P. Geil
Halsnæs Municipality	Steen Hasselriis	Steffen Jensen
Hedensted Municipality	Kirsten Terkilsen	Kasper Glyngø
Helsingør Municipality	Benedikte Kiær	Benedikte Kiær
Herlev Municipality	Thomas Gyldal Petersen	Thomas Gyldal Petersen
Herning Municipality	Lars Krarup	Lars Krarup
Hillerød Municipality	Dorte Meldgaard	Kirsten Jensen
Hjørring Municipality	Arne Boelt	Arne Boelt
Holbæk Municipality	Søren Kjærsgaard	Christina Krzyrosiak Hansen
Holstebro Municipality	H.C. Østerby	H.C. Østerby
Horsens Municipality	Peter Sørensen	Peter Sørensen
Hvidovre Municipality	Helle Moesgaard Adelborg	Helle Moesgaard Adelborg
Høje-Taastrup Municipality	Michael Ziegler	Michael Ziegler
Hørsholm Municipality	Morten Slotved	Morten Slotved
Ikast-Brande Municipality	Carsten Kissmeyer	Ib Boye Lauritsen
Ishøj Municipality	Ole Bjørstorp	Ole Bjørstorp
Jammerbugt Municipality	Mogens Gade	Mogens Gade
Kalundborg Municipality	Martin Damm	Martin Damm
Kerteminde Municipality	Hans Luunbjerg	Kasper Olesen
Kolding Municipality	Jørn Pedersen	Jørn Pedersen
Køge Municipality	Flemming Christensen	Marie Stærke
Langeland Municipality	Bjarne Nielsen	Tonni Hansen
Lejre Municipality	Carsten Rasmussen	Carsten Rasmussen
Lemvig Municipality	Erik Flyvholm	Erik Flyvholm
Lolland Municipality	Holger Schou Rasmussen	Holger Schou Rasmussen
Lyngby-Taarbæk Municipality	Sofia Osmani	Sofia Osmani
Læsø Municipality	Tobias Birch Johansen	Karsten Nielsen
Mariagerfjord Municipality	Mogens Jespersen	Mogens Jespersen
Middelfart Municipality	Johannes Lundsfryd Jensen	Johannes Lundsfryd Jensen
Morsø Municipality	Hans Ejner Bertelsen	Hans Ejner Bertelsen
Norddjurs Municipality	Jan Petersen	Jan Petersen
Nordfyn Municipality	Morten Andersen	Morten Andersen
Nyborg Municipality	Kenneth Muhs	Kenneth Muhs
Næstved Municipality	Carsten Rasmussen	Carsten Rasmussen
Odder Municipality	Uffe Jensen	Uffe Jensen
Odense Municipality	Peter Rahbæk Juel	Peter Rahbæk Juel
Odsherred Municipality	Thomas Adelskov	Thomas Adelskov
Randers Municipality	Claus Omann Jensen	Torben Hansen
Rebild Municipality	Leon Sebbelin	Leon Sebbelin
Ringkøbing-Skjern Municipality	Iver Enevoldsen	Hans Østergaard
Ringsted Municipality	Henrik Hvidesten	Henrik Hvidesten
Roskilde Municipality	Joy Mogensen	Joy Mogensen
Rudersdal Municipality	Jens Ive	Jens Ive
Rødovre Municipality	Erik Nielsen	Erik Nielsen
Samsø Municipality	Marcel Meijer	Marcel Meijer
Silkeborg Municipality	Steen Vindum	Steen Vindum
Skanderborg Municipality	Jørgen Gaarde	Jørgen Gaarde
Skive Municipality	Peder Chr. Kirkegaard	Peder Chr. Kirkegaard
Slagelse Municipality	Sten Knuth	John Dyrby Paulsen
Solrød Municipality	Niels Emil Hörup	Niels Emil Hörup
Sorø Municipality	Gert Jørgensen	Gert Jørgensen
Stevns Municipality	Mogens Haugaard Nielsen	Anette Mortensen
Struer Municipality	Mads Jakobsen	Niels Viggo Lynghøj
Svendborg Municipality	Lars Erik Hornemann	Bo Hansen
Syddjurs Municipality	Claus Wistoft	Ole Bollesen
Sønderborg Municipality	Erik Lauritzen	Erik Lauritzen
Thisted Municipality	Lene Kjelgaard Jensen	Ulla Vestergaard
Tønder Municipality	Henrik Frandsen	Henrik Frandsen
Tårnby Municipality	Henrik Zimino	Allan Andersen
Vallensbæk Municipality	Henrik Rasmussen	Henrik Rasmussen
Varde Municipality	Erik Buhl	Erik Buhl
Vejen Municipality	Egon Fræhr	Egon Fræhr
Vejle Municipality	Jens Ejner Christensen	Jens Ejner Christensen
Vesthimmerland Municipality	Knud Vældgaard Kristensen	Per Bach Laursen
Viborg Municipality	Torsten Nielsen	Ulrik Wilbek
Vordingborg Municipality	Michael Seiding Larsen	Mikael Smed
Ærø Municipality	Jørgen Otto Jørgensen	Ole Wej Petersen
Aabenraa Municipality	Thomas Andresen	Thomas Andresen
Aalborg Municipality	Thomas Kastrup Larsen	Thomas Kastrup Larsen
Aarhus Municipality	Jacob Bundsgaard	Jacob Bundsgaard
