= 2021 Dragør municipal election =

- 16 November 2021

All 15 seats to the Dragør Municipal Council 8 seats needed for a majority
- Turnout: 8,483 (75.9%) ▼2.0pp
| | First party | Second party | Third party |
|---|---|---|---|
| | C | T | A |
| Party | Conservatives | Tværpolitisk Forening | Social Democrats |
| Last election | 3 seats, 16.2% | 4 seats, 26.6% | 3 seats, 15.2% |
| Seats won | 6 | 3 | 3 |
| Seat change | ▲3 | ▼1 | 0 |
| Popular vote | 2,874 | 1,553 | 1,244 |
| Percentage | 34.3% | 18.5% | 14.8% |
| Swing | ▲18.1% | ▼8.1% | ▼0.4% |
| | Fourth party | Fifth party | Sixth party |
| | V | L | O |
| Party | Venstre | Sydamagerlisten | Danish People's Party |
| Last election | 3 seats, 20.6% | Did Not Stand | 2 seats, 10.5% |
| Seats won | 2 | 1 | 0 |
| Seat change | ▼1 | ▲1 | ▼2 |
| Popular vote | 1,011 | 529 | 273 |
| Percentage | 12.1% | 6.3% | 3.3% |
| Swing | ▼8.5% | New | ▼7.2% |
Mayor before election
Helle Barth (Note: Eik Dahl Bidstrup was elected following the 2017 election, but stepped down before his term ended)
Venstre
Mayor after election
Kenneth Gøtterup
Conservatives

Following the 2017 election, Eik Dahl Bidstrup from Venstre won his 2nd consecutive term as mayor of Dragør Municipality.

In March 2021, Eik Dahl Bidstrup stepped down as mayor after he had accepted an offer to become chairman of Kristelig Fagbevægelse. It would be Helle Barth, also from Venstre, who would take over the last months before this election.

In this election, the Conservatives would gain 3 seats, and become the largest party with a total of 6 seats. They would manage to find an agreement with the Social Democrats and Venstre, seeing Kenneth Gøtterup from the Conservatives become the first mayor of the municipality since 2006.

== Electoral system ==
For elections to Danish municipalities, a number varying from 9 to 31 are chosen to be elected to the municipal council. The seats are then allocated using the D'Hondt method and a closed list proportional representation. Dragør Municipality had 15 seats in 2021

Unlike in Danish General Elections, in elections to municipal councils, electoral alliances are allowed.

== Electoral alliances ==
=== Electoral Alliance 1 ===
| Party | | Political alignment |
|---|---|---|
| A | Social Democrats | Centre-left |
| F | Green Left | Centre-left to Left-wing |

=== Electoral Alliance 2 ===
| Party | | Political alignment |
|---|---|---|
| B | Social Liberals | Centre to Centre-left |
| I | Liberal Alliance | Centre-right to Right-wing |
| L | Sydamagerlisten | Local politics |

=== Electoral Alliance 3 ===
| Party | | Political alignment |
|---|---|---|
| E | Anne Grønlund | Local politics |
| T | Tværpolitisk Forening | Local politics |

=== Electoral Alliance 4 ===
| Party | | Political alignment |
|---|---|---|
| C | Conservatives | Centre-right |
| D | New Right | Right-wing to Far-right |

=== Electoral Alliance 5 ===
| Party | | Political alignment |
|---|---|---|
| O | Danish People's Party | Right-wing to Far-right |
| V | Venstre | Centre-right |

== Results by polling station ==
E = Anne Grønlund

| Division | A | B | C | D | E | F | I | L | O | T | V |
| Division | % | % | % | % | % | % | % | % | % | % | % |
|---|---|---|---|---|---|---|---|---|---|---|---|
| Dragør Skole | 13.1 | 4.4 | 35.6 | 1.7 | 0.4 | 3.9 | 0.3 | 4.6 | 2.6 | 20.8 | 12.5 |
| Hollænderhallen | 15.9 | 3.9 | 33.5 | 2.3 | 0.1 | 3.7 | 0.8 | 7.3 | 3.7 | 17.1 | 11.8 |

== Results ==
| Party | | Votes | % | +/- | Seats | +/- |
Dragør Municipality
| C | Conservatives | 2,874 | 34.27 | +18.09 | 6 | +3 |
| T | Tværpolitisk Forening | 1,553 | 18.52 | -8.08 | 3 | -1 |
| A | Social Democrats | 1,244 | 14.83 | -0.35 | 3 | 0 |
| V | Venstre | 1,011 | 12.06 | -8.56 | 2 | -1 |
| L | Sydamagerlisten | 529 | 6.31 | New | 1 | New |
| B | Social Liberals | 345 | 4.11 | +0.81 | 0 | 0 |
| F | Green Left | 313 | 3.73 | New | 0 | New |
| O | Danish People's Party | 273 | 3.26 | -7.22 | 0 | -2 |
| D | New Right | 172 | 2.05 | New | 0 | New |
| I | Liberal Alliance | 52 | 0.62 | -1.61 | 0 | 0 |
| E | Anne Grønlund | 20 | 0.24 | -0.21 | 0 | 0 |
| Total | | 8,386 | 100 | N/A | 15 | N/A |
| Invalid votes | | 21 | 0.19 | -0.03 | | |
| Blank votes | | 76 | 0.68 | +0.01 | | |
| Turnout | | 8,483 | 75.90 | -1.98 | | |
Source: valg.dk
