= Opinion polling for the 2021 Danish local elections =

In the run–up to the 2021 Danish local elections, multiple organisations carried out opinion polling for the city and regional councils for some of the 98 municipalities of Denmark and 5 regions of Denmark. Results of some of the polls are displayed below.

The date range for these opinion polls are from the previous local elections, held on 21 November 2017 until the election on 16 November 2021.

== By percentage ==
=== Bornholm ===
Polling firm	Fieldwork date	Sample size	A	V	O	Ø	Å	K	F	B	I	C	D	Others	Lead
Jysk Analyse	11-14 Oct 2021	1,028	17.8	14.0	17.4	25.8	1.1	4.1	5.2	1.5	—	5.4	3.4	4.3	8.0
Jysk Analyse	6-8 Sep 2021	1,087	22.1	18.1	15.3	20.3	1.7	5.0	3.9	2.4	1.4	2.8	3.3	3.7	1.8
Jysk Analyse	16-19 Aug 2021	1,127	26.2	24.4	12.8	15.5	1.0	5.3	4.5	1.7	0.0	3.6	2.7	1.6	1.8
Jysk Analyse	16-19 Nov 2020	1,019	38.0	29.1	8.1	11.6	0.8	4.2	4.1	0.7	0.5	1.1	1.6	0.3	8.9
2017 Danish local elections (Bornholm)	21 Nov 2017	–	34.2	18.6	15.7	6.3	6.0	4.2	3.5	2.8	1.0	0.8	0.5	6.2	15.6

=== Copenhagen ===
Polling firm	Fieldwork date	Sample size	A	Ø	Å	B	F	V	C	O	I	D	K	G	Others	Lead
Epinion	27 Oct-4 Nov 2020	1,023	23.8	22.2	2.8	10.5	12.3	9.7	7.9	2.0	2.4	4.0	0.5	0.5	1.6	1.6
2017 Danish local elections (Copenhagen)	21 Nov 2017	–	27.6	18.4	10.5	8.9	7.9	5.6	5.0	3.9	1.0	0.3	—	—	1.4	9.3

=== Fredericia ===
Polling firm	Fieldwork date	Sample size	A	V	O	Ø	F	C	I	Å	B	D	K	Others	Lead
Jysk Analyse	14-21 Jan 2021	1,013	47.2	18.6	7.9	5.6	5.2	6.1	1.4	0.8	3.1	3.6	0.2	—	28.6
2017 Danish local elections (Fredericia)	21 Nov 2017	–	54.3	18.2	12.2	4.0	3.5	2.4	1.4	1.4	1.2	0.8	0.3	0.3	36.1

=== Hedensted ===
Polling firm	Fieldwork date	Sample size	V	A	O	K	F	Ø	I	C	B	Å	D	Others	Lead
Jysk Analyse	11-14 Jan 2021	1,054	25.7	33.7	12.7	3.7	3.7	3.4	2.4	4.7	1.6	1.0	5.1	—	8.0
2017 Danish local elections (Hedensted)	21 Nov 2017	–	39.9	27.8	16.5	4.4	3.9	2.0	1.8	1.5	1.1	1.0	—	—	12.1

=== Herning ===
Polling firm	Fieldwork date	Sample size	V	A	O	B	F	C	K	Ø	I	Å	D	Others	Lead
Jysk Analyse	4-6 Oct 2021	1,029	47.6	18.1	2.4	5.5	4.4	7.3	3.4	1.5	1.4	—	4.1	—	29.5
2017 Danish local elections (Herning)	21 Nov 2017	–	55.6	16.8	5.7	5.0	4.3	4.2	3.2	2.2	1.5	0.9	0.5	0.1	38.8

=== Odense ===
Polling firm	Fieldwork date	Sample size	A	V	C	Ø	O	F	B	Å	I	D	K	Others	Lead
Jysk Analyse	7-10 Dec 2020	1,014	39.0	19.3	8.9	7.8	4.9	6.6	5.1	2.1	3.5	2.6	—	—	19.7
Megafon	16-18 Sep 2020	1,047	30.3	24.6	13.0	7.8	3.6	6.7	6.1	1.5	1.2	3.8	—	1.4	5.7
2017 Danish local elections (Odense)	21 Nov 2017	–	41.8	19.2	8.6	6.6	6.4	5.0	4.7	3.1	2.0	0.8	0.2	1.5	21.6

== By seats ==
=== Horsens ===
Polling firm	Fieldwork date	Sample size	A	V	O	I	Ø	C	F	B	Å	D	K	Others	Lead
Jysk Analyse	5-11 Jan 2021	1,050	13	6	1	1	1	2	1	1	0	1	0	0	7
2017 Danish local elections (Horsens)	21 Nov 2017	–	13	7	3	1	1	1	1	0	0	0	0	0	6

=== Vejle ===
Polling firm	Fieldwork date	Sample size	A	V	O	F	C	B	I	D	K	Ø	Å	Others	Lead
Jysk Analyse	4-7 Jan 2021	1,030	11	9	2	2	3	1	1	1	0	1	0	0	2
2017 Danish local elections (Vejle)	21 Nov 2017	–	11	10	3	3	2	1	1	0	0	0	0	0	1
