= Ærø Plus =

- Leader: Carl Jørgen Heide
- Founded: September 2013
- Headquarters: Ærø
- Ideology: Regionalism
- Municipal councils: 3 / 2,432

Website
- Ærøplus.dk

Ærø Plus is a local political party set in Ærø Municipality.

== History ==
Ærø Plus was founded in September, 2013, with Carl Jørgen Heide as the chairman.

At the 2013 local election, the list ran with 11 candidates in Ærø Municipality. They got 14.4% of the votes in that municipality, which resulted in two municipal seats. Søren Vestergaard and Carl Jørgen Heide were elected for the list.

== Election results ==
=== Municipal elections ===
Date	Votes	Seats	
Date	Votes	#	±
2013	619	2 / 2,444	New
2017		1 / 2,432	▼1
2021	836	3 / 2,432	▲3
