= Citizens' List (Kerteminde) =

Citizens' List Borgerlisten
- Founded: November 21st, 2008
- Headquarters: Kerteminde
- Colours: Orange
- Municipal councils: 1 / 2,432

Website
- borgerliste.dk

The Citizens' List (Danish: Borgerlisten) in Kerteminde is a Danish local political party.

== History ==
The party was founded on November 21, 2008 by former member of Venstre, Jørgen Schou. Kåre Jørgensen, also from Venstre, and Erling Knudsen from Conservative People's Party both joined Schou's newly founded party. In 2009, Søren Lilienhoff was elected as the leader of the party. At the 2009 local elections, three members of the Citizens' List were elected into the municipal council in Kerteminde Municipality, with the party receiving 12.6% of the votes in the municipality. The Citizens' List supports the independent politician Sonja Rasmussen, who becomes the mayor of the municipality. Sonja Rasmussen joined the Citizens' List in 2012. In the 2013 local elections, the party receives six seats in the municipal council in Kerteminde, receiving 21.0% of the votes in the municipality.

== Election results ==
=== Municipal elections ===
Date	Votes	Seats	
Date	Votes	#	±
2009	1,660	3 / 2,468	New
2013	3,038	6 / 2,444	▲3
2017		1 / 2,432	▼5
