= Blovstrød List =

Blovstrød List Blovstrød Listen
- Leader: Frands Havaleschka
- Founded: 2001
- Dissolved: 2021
- Headquarters: Blovstrød
- Ideology: Localism
- Colours: Orange

Website
- blovstroedlisten.dk

The Blovstrød List (Danish: Blovstrød Listen) was a Danish local political party set in Allerød Municipality.

== History ==
The party was founded in 2001 by Frands Havaleschka, Klaus Kristensen and Matt Axelberg.

The party received 1,092 votes in 2001, resulting in a single seat in Allerød's municipality council. They received 1,079 votes in 2005, winning them two seats. In 2009, the party received 1,005 votes, equal to 7.6% of all votes in Allerød Municipality, which won the party a single seat in the municipality council. They received slightly fewer votes in 2013, with 708 votes. This was equal to 4.9% of the votes, allowing them to retain their seat in the municipality council. They retained their seat again in the 2017 elections, where they received 703 votes, equal to 4.7% of the votes in the municipality.

During the 2017–2021 term, their elected member Erling Petersen left the party and joined Venstre instead. This left the party without representation in the municipal council. The party was afterwards unable to find a new candidate to run in the 2021 Danish local elections, and the party was dissolved in the fall of 2021.

== Election results ==
=== Municipal elections ===
Date	Votes	Seats		Change
Date	Votes	Allerød Mun.	Denmark	Change
2001	1,092	1 / 21	1 / 4,685	New
2005	1,079	2 / 21	2 / 2,522	▲1
2009	1,005	1 / 21	1 / 2,468	▼1
2013	1,310	1 / 21	1 / 2,444	0
2017	703	1 / 21	1 / 2,432	0
