= Læsø Listen =

The Læsø List Læsø Listen
- Ideology: Regionalism
- Municipal councils: 2 / 2,432

The Læsø List (Danish: Læsø Listen) is a local political party in Denmark, set in Læsø Municipality.

== Politicians from the Læsø List ==
- Thomas W. Olsen. Mayor in Læsø Municipality, from 2010 to 2013.
- Bent Bjørn. Deputy mayor in Læsø Municipality, from 2010.
- Tobias Birch Johansen. Mayor in Læsø Municipality, from 2014-2017. Switched parties to The Liberal Party in late 2014.

== Election results ==
=== Municipal elections ===
Date	Seats	
Date	#	±
2005	2 / 2,522	▲2
2009	1 / 2,468	▼1
2013	3 / 2,444	▲2
2017	2 / 2,432	▼1
