= The Landowners =

The Landowners Grundejerne
- Leader: Eilif Nørgaard
- Founded: March 2013
- Headquarters: Solrød
- Ideology: Liberalism; Regionalism
- Colours: Lime green
- Municipal councils: 1 / 2,432

The Landowners (Danish: Grundejerne) is a local political party set in Solrød Municipality.

== History ==
The Landowners was founded in March, 2013 by Eilif Nørgaard. The founding of the party was well received by local politicians from both Conservative People's Party and Social Democrats.

The party ran with five candidates in 2013, and got 9.4% of the votes in Solrød Municipality, giving them two seats in the municipal council. Jan Færch and Eilif Nørgaard were the two elected Landowners.

== Election results ==
=== Municipal elections ===
| Date | Votes | Seats | |
| Date | Votes | # | ± |
|---|---|---|---|
| 2013 | 1.138 | 2 / 2,444 | New |
| 2017 | | 1 / 2,432 | ▼1 |
