= Miljølisten (Fanø) =

- Leader: Bo Knudsen
- Headquarters: Fanø
- Ideology: Green Politics; Regionalism
- Municipal councils: 1 / 2,432

Website
- Miljoelisten.dk

Miljølisten is a local political party set in Fanø Municipality.

== History ==
Miljølisten has been represented in Fanø Municipality's municipal council since 1978, though not between 1994 and 1997.

In the 2013 municipal election, Miljølisten received 11.8% of the votes in Fanø Municipality, giving them two seats in the municipal council.

== Election results ==
=== Municipal elections ===
Date	Votes	Seats	
Date	Votes	#	±
1978			New
1981			
1985			
1989			
1993	Did not run		
1997			
2001		2 / 4,647	
2005	499	3 / 2,522	▲1
2009	190	1 / 2,468	▼2
2013	264	2 / 2,444	▲1
2017	124	1 / 2,432	▼1
