= Our Allerød =

New Allerød Det Nye Allerød
- Leader: Viggo Janum
- Founded: 2009
- Dissolved: 2021
- Headquarters: Lillerød
- Ideology: Regionalism
- Colours: Orange

Our Allerød (Danish: Vores Allerød), previously New Allerød (Danish: Det Nye Allerød) was a local political party set in Allerød Municipality.

== History ==
The party, as New Allerød, first ran for municipal councils in 2009, where 8.6% of the votes in Allerød Municipality. This ensured them two seats in the municipal council. In the regional elections, in Capital Region of Denmark, New Allerød gained 0.1% of the votes. In the 2013 local elections, New Allerød gained 9.1% of the votes in Allerød Municipality, giving them two seats in the municipal council. They received 0.2% of the votes in the regional election, which was not enough for any seats in the regional council.

In 2016 the party merged with The New Right, but some members of the old party continued the local party as Our Allerød. Viggo Janum became the front figure of the party. In the 2017 elections the party received 809 votes, equal to 5.4% of the votes in the municipality. This gave them a seat in the municipal council. In 2021 the party was dissolved, after being unable to find a new candidate to run in place of Viggo Janum.

== Election results ==
=== Municipal elections ===
Date	Votes	Seats		Change
Date	Votes	Allerød Mun.	Denmark	Change
2009	1,133	2 / 21	2 / 2,468	New
2013	1,310	2 / 21	2 / 2,444	0
2017	809	1 / 21	1 / 2,432	▼1

=== Regional elections ===
Date	Votes	Seats	
Date	Votes	#	±
2009	1,038	0 / 205	New
2013	1,684	0 / 205	Steady
2017	Did not run		
