= 2009 Danish local elections =

← 2005	17 November 2009	2013 →
- 98 municipal councils 5 regional councils
Party	Leader	Vote %	Seats	+/–
Social Democrats	Helle Thorning-Schmidt	30.3%	801	−99
Venstre	Lars Løkke Rasmussen	24.5%	699	−105
SF	Villy Søvndal	14.3%	340	+178
Conservatives	Lene Espersen	10.9%	262	+5
DPP	Pia Kjærsgaard	8.0%	186	+61
Social Liberals	Margrethe Vestager	3.7%	50	−36
Red–Green	Collective leadership	2.3%	14	−10
Chr. Democrats	Bjarne H. Kirkegaard	0.4%	6	−9
Schleswig Party	Gerhard Mammen	0.2%	6	+2
Liberal Alliance	Anders Samuelsen	0.3%	1	New
Other		4.0%	103	−42
This lists parties that won seats. See the complete results below.

Local elections were held in Denmark on 17 November 2009. Councils were elected in Denmark's 98 municipalities and the five regions. 2468 seats were contested in the municipal elections (previous election: 2522 seats). 205 seats were contested in the regional elections.

== Legal basis ==
The electoral details are laid down in the municipal and regional electoral act. The elections are overseen by the Ministry of the Interior.

== Results ==
=== Results of regional elections ===
The Ministry of the Interior reported a voter turnout of 65.7%, the lowest participation in Danish local and regional elections since the 1974 Danish local elections, when turnout was 62.9%. The regions are not municipalities and have no independent power to levy taxes; they are financed instead through block grants from the central government and from the municipalities within each region.

The results of the regional elections were as follows:

==== Number of councillors and political parties in the regional councils ====
Party		Seats	Change
A	Social Democrats (Socialdemokraterne)	68	▼9
V	Venstre (Venstre)	54	▼6
F	Socialist People's Party (Socialistisk Folkeparti)	32	▲20
C	Conservative People's Party (Konservative Folkeparti)	20	0
O	Danish People's Party (Dansk Folkeparti)	19	▲5
B	Danish Social Liberal Party (Radikale Venstre)	7	▼4
Ø	Red-Green Alliance (Enhedslisten)	2	▼4
	Others	3	0
Total		205	

=== Results of municipal elections ===
The Ministry of the Interior stated that voter turnout was 65.8%. The results of the municipal elections:

==== Number of councillors and political parties in the municipal councils ====
Sum of 98 local elections
Party		Share of vote		Seats	
Party		Percent	Change	Number	Change
A	Social Democrats (Socialdemokraterne)	30.3 %	-3.6 %	801	▼99
V	Venstre (Venstre)	24.5 %	-2.7 %	699	▼105
F	Socialist People's Party (Socialistisk Folkeparti)	14.3 %	+7.0 %	340	▲178
C	Conservative People's Party (Konservative Folkeparti)	10.9 %	+0.8 %	262	▲5
O	Danish People's Party (Dansk Folkeparti)	8.0 %	+2.2 %	186	▲61
B	Danish Social Liberal Party (Radikale Venstre)	3.7 %	-1.4 %	50	▼36
Ø	Red-Green Alliance (Enhedslisten)	2.3 %	-0.4 %	14	▼10
K	Christian Democrats (Kristendemokraterne)	0.4 %	-0.6 %	6	▼9
S	Schleswig Party (Slesvigsk Parti)	0.2%	+0.1 %	6	▲2
I	Liberal Alliance (Liberal Alliance)	0.3 %	New	1	New
	Others	4.0 %	-2.6 %	103	▼42
Total				2,468	▼54

==== Mayors in the municipalities ====
The mayors (Danish: borgmester; plural: borgmestre) of the 98 municipalities heads the council meetings and is the chairman of the finance committee in each of their respective municipalities. Only in Copenhagen, this mayor – the head of the finance committee and council meetings – is called the lord mayor (Danish: overborgmester).

Mayors after the election
Party	Number	Change
Social Democrats	49	▲4
Venstre	31	▼6
Conservative People's Party	12	▲2
Local parties	4	▼1
Socialist People's Party	2	▲2
Danish Social Liberal Party	0	▼1

=== Old and new mayors in the municipalities ===
The term of office for the mayors elected by the majority of councillors among its members in each municipal council is the same as for the councils elected. The correct name for the municipality on the somewhat remote island of Bornholm is regional municipality, because the municipality also handles several tasks not carried out by the other Danish municipalities but by the regions.

Mayors outgoing and incoming
Municipality	Incumbent mayor	Elected mayor
Albertslund Municipality	Finn Aaberg	Steen Christiansen
Allerød Municipality	Erik Lund	Erik Lund
Assens Municipality	Finn Brunse	Finn Brunse
Ballerup Municipality	Ove E. Dalsgaard	Ove E. Dalsgaard
Billund Municipality	Ib Kristensen	Ib Kristensen
Bornholm Regional Municipality	Bjarne Kristiansen	Winni Grosbøll
Brøndby Municipality	Ib Terp	Ib Terp
Brønderslev Municipality	Mikael Klitgaard	Lene Hansen
Copenhagen Municipality	Ritt Bjerregaard	Frank Jensen
Dragør Municipality	Allan Holst	Allan Holst
Egedal Municipality	Svend Kjærgaard	Willy Eliasen
Esbjerg Municipality	Johnny Søtrup	Johnny Søtrup
Fanø Municipality	Erik Nørreby	Erik Nørreby
Favrskov Municipality	Anders G. Christensen	Nils Borring
Faxe Municipality	René Tuekær	Knud Erik Hansen
Fredensborg Municipality	Olav Aaen	Thomas Lykke Pedersen
Fredericia Municipality	Uffe Steiner Jensen	Thomas Banke
Frederiksberg Municipality	Jørgen Glenthøj	Jørgen Glenthøj
Frederikshavn Municipality	Erik Sørensen	Lars Møller
Frederikssund Municipality	Ole Find Jensen	Ole Find Jensen
Furesø Municipality	Jesper Bach	Ole Bondo Christensen
Faaborg-Midtfyn Municipality	Bo Andersen	Hans Jørgensen
Gentofte Municipality	Hans Toft	Hans Toft
Gladsaxe Municipality	Karin Søjberg Holst	Karin Søjberg Holst
Glostrup Municipality	Søren Enemark	John Engelhardt
Greve Municipality	Hans Barlach	Hans Barlach
Gribskov Municipality	Jannich Petersen	Jan Ferdinandsen
Guldborgsund Municipality	Kaj Petersen	John Brædder
Haderslev Municipality	H.P. Geil	Jens Christian Gjesing
Halsnæs Municipality	Helge Friis	Helge Friis
Hedensted Municipality	Jørn Juhl Nielsen	Kirsten Terkilsen
Helsingør Municipality	Per Tærsbøl	Johannes Hect-Nielsen
Herlev Municipality	Kjeld Hansen	Kjeld Hansen
Herning Municipality	Lars Krarup	Lars Krarup
Hillerød Municipality	Kirsten Jensen	Kirsten Jensen
Hjørring Municipality	Finn Olesen	Arne Boelt
Holbæk Municipality	Jørn Sørensen	Søren Kjærsgård
Holstebro Municipality	Arne Lægaard	H.C. Østerby
Horsens Municipality	Jan Trøjborg	Jan Trøjborg
Hvidovre Municipality	Milton Graff Pedersen	Milton Graff Pedersen
Høje-Taastrup Municipality	Michael Ziegler	Michael Ziegler
Hørsholm Municipality	Uffe Thorndal	Morten Slotved
Ikast-Brande Municipality	Carsten Kissmeyer	Carsten Kissmeyer
Ishøj Municipality	Ole Bjørstorp	Ole Bjørstorp
Jammerbugt Municipality	Mogens Gade	Mogens Gade
Kalundborg Municipality	Kaj Buch Jensen	Martin Damm
Kerteminde Municipality	Palle Hansborg-Sørensen	Sonja Rasmussen
Kolding Municipality	Per Bødker Andersen	Jørn Pedersen
Køge Municipality	Marie Stærke	Marie Stærke
Langeland Municipality	Knud Gether	Bjarne Nielsen
Lejre Municipality	Flemming Jensen	Mette Touborg
Lemvig Municipality	Erik Flyvholm	Erik Flyvholm
Lolland Municipality	Stig Vestergaard	Stig Vestergaard
Lyngby-Taarbæk Municipality	Rolf Aagaard-Svendsen	Søren P. Rasmussen
Læsø Municipality	Olav Juul Gaarn Larsen	Thomas W. Olsen
Mariagerfjord Municipality	Hans Christian Maarup	Hans Christian Maarup
Middelfart Municipality	Steen Dahlstrøm	Steen Dahlstrøm
Morsø Municipality	Egon Plejdrup Poulsen	Lauge Larsen
Norddjurs Municipality	Torben Jensen	Jan Petersen
Nordfyn Municipality	Bent Dyssemark	Morten Andersen
Nyborg Municipality	Jørn Terndrup	Erik Skov Christensen
Næstved Municipality	Henning Jensen	Henning Jensen
Odder Municipality	Niels-Ulrik Bugge	Elvin J. Hansen
Odense Municipality	Jan Boye	Anker Boye
Odsherred Municipality	Finn Madsen	Thomas Adelskov
Randers Municipality	Henning Jensen Nyhuus	Henning Jensen Nyhuus
Rebild Municipality	Anny Winther	Anny Winther
Ringkøbing-Skjern Municipality	Torben Nørregaard	Iver Enevoldsen
Ringsted Municipality	Niels Ulrich Hermansen	Niels Ulrich Hermansen
Roskilde Municipality	Poul Lindor Nielsen	Poul Lindor Nielsen
Rudersdal Municipality	Erik Fabrin	Erik Fabrin
Rødovre Municipality	Erik Nielsen	Erik Nielsen
Samsø Municipality	Carsten Bruun	Jørn C. Nissen
Silkeborg Municipality	Jens Erik Jørgensen	Hanne Bæk Olsen
Skanderborg Municipality	Jens Grønlund	Jørgen Gaarde
Skive Municipality	Flemming Eskildsen	Flemming Eskildsen
Slagelse Municipality	Lis Tribler	Lis Tribler
Solrød Municipality	Niels Emil Hörup	Niels Emil Hörup
Sorø Municipality	Ivan Hansen	Ivan Hansen
Stevns Municipality	Poul Arne Nielsen	Poul Arne Nielsen
Struer Municipality	Martin Merrild	Niels Viggo Lynghøj
Svendborg Municipality	Lars Erik Hornemann	Curt Sørensen
Syddjurs Municipality	Vilfred Friborg Hansen	Kirstine Bille
Sønderborg Municipality	Jan Prokopek Jensen	Aase Nyegaard
Thisted Municipality	Erik Hove Olesen	Lene Kjeldgaard
Tønder Municipality	Laurids Rudebeck	Laurids Rudebeck
Tårnby Municipality	Henrik Zimino	Henrik Zimino
Vallensbæk Municipality	Kurt Hockerup	Kurt Hockerup
Varde Municipality	Gylling Haahr	Gylling Haahr
Vejen Municipality	Egon Fræhr	Egon Fræhr
Vejle Municipality	Leif Skov	Arne Sigtenbjerggaard
Vesthimmerland Municipality	Jens Styrbæk Lauritzen	Knud Vældgaard Kristensen
Viborg Municipality	Johannes Stensgaard	Søren Pape Poulsen
Vordingborg Municipality	Henrik Holmer	Henrik Holmer
Ærø Municipality	Jørgen Otto Jørgensen	Karsten Landro
Aabenraa Municipality	Tove Larsen	Tove Larsen
Aalborg Municipality	Henning G. Jensen	Henning G. Jensen
Aarhus Municipality	Nicolai Wammen	Nicolai Wammen
