= Uffe Jensen =

Danish politician

Mayor of Odder Municipality
- Incumbent
- Assumed office 1 January 2014
- Preceded by: Elvin J. Hansen (A)

Personal details
- Born: 8 October 1960 (age 65) Aarhus, Denmark
- Party: Venstre

Uffe Jensen (born 8 October 1960) is a Danish politician. He is a member of the party Venstre, and is the current mayor of Odder Municipality. He became mayor after the 2013 Danish local elections, but has been in the municipal council since 2009. He has a background as police assistant.
