= Herlev Municipality =

Herlev Municipality Herlev Kommune (Danish)
- Municipality
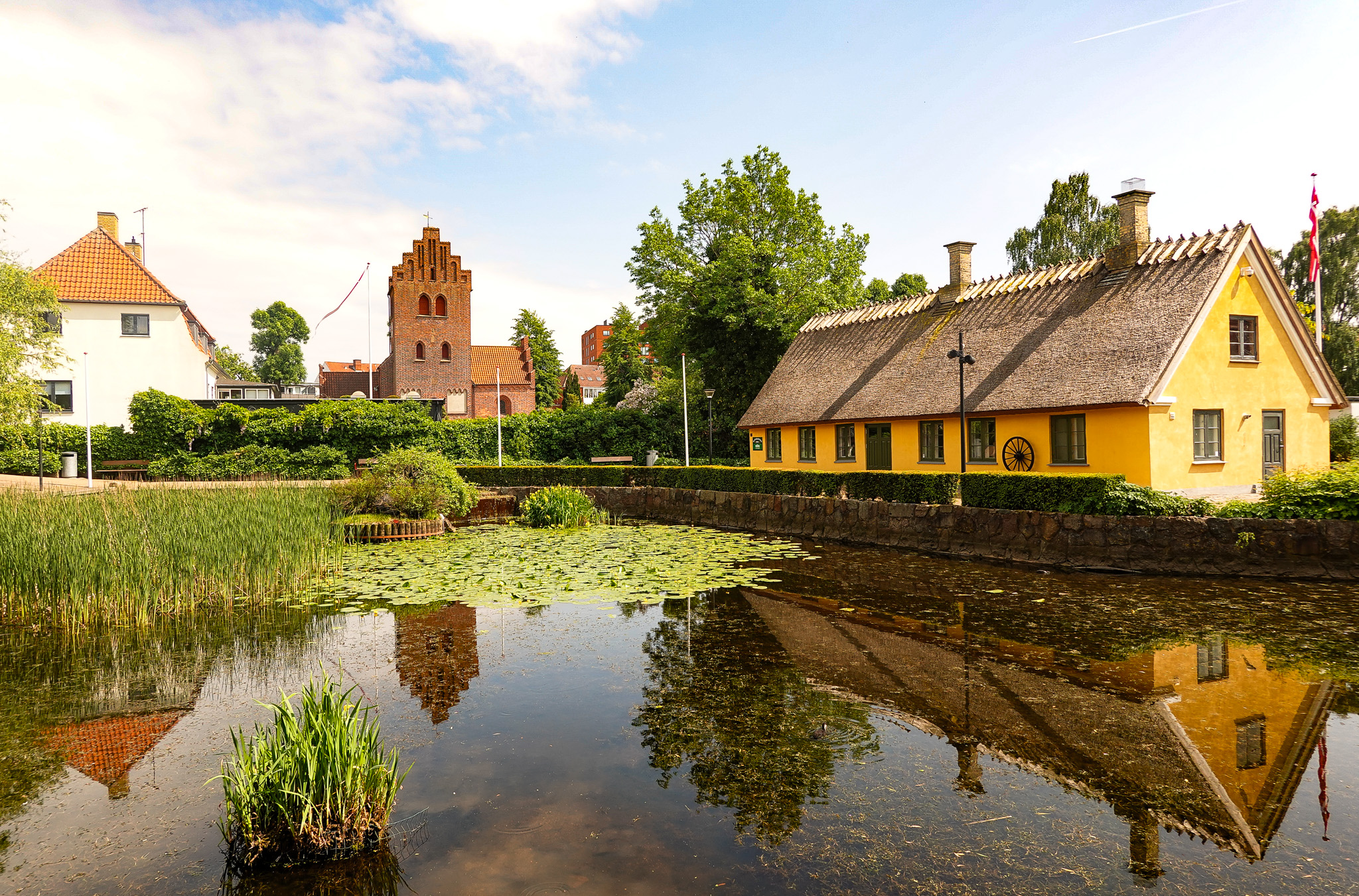
- The historic centre of Herlev, with the church and village pond.

- Coat of arms

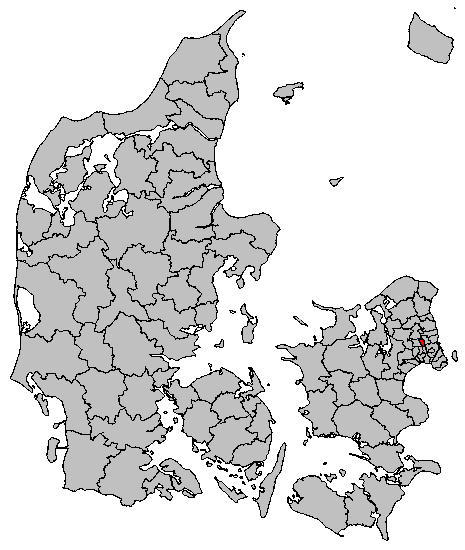
- Coordinates: 55°43′34″N 12°26′02″E
- Country: Denmark
- Region: Hovedstaden
- Established: 1 April 1909
- Seat: Herlev

Government
  - Mayor: Marco Damgaard (S)

Area
  - Total: 12.04 km^{2} (4.65 sq mi)

Population (1 January 2026)
  - Total: 32,030
  - Density: 2,660/km^{2} (6,890/sq mi)
- Time zone: UTC+1 (CET)
  - Summer (DST): UTC+2 (CEST)
- Municipal code: 163
- Website: www.herlev.dk

Herlev Municipality (Danish: Herlev Kommune) is a municipality (Danish, kommune) in the northwestern suburbs of Copenhagen, Capital Region, Denmark. The municipality covers an area of 12 km^{2}, and has a total population of 32,030 (1 January 2026). Its mayor is Marco Damgaard, a member of the Social Democrats (Socialdemokraterne) political party. The former village Herlev is the largest settlement of the municipal and the site of the municipal council. It is best known for being the site of Herlev Hospital.

Neighboring municipalities are Gladsaxe to the east and northeast, Furesø Municipality to the north, Ballerup to the west, Glostrup to the southwest, Rødovre to the south, and Copenhagen to the southeast.

== History ==
Herlev municipality was not merged with other municipalities on 1 January 2007 as part of nationwide Kommunalreformen ("The Municipal Reform" of 2007).

== Politics ==
=== Municipal council ===
Herlev's municipal council consists of 19 members, elected every four years.

Below are the municipal councils elected since the Municipal Reform of 2007.

Election	Party							Total seats	Turnout	Elected mayor
Election	A	B	C	F	O	V	Ø	Total seats	Turnout	Elected mayor
2005	12	1	2	2	1	1		19	67.1%	Kjeld Hansen (A)
2009	11		2	4	1	1		19	63.6%	Kjeld Hansen (A)
2013	13		1	1	2	1	1	19	69.6%	Thomas Gyldal Petersen (A)
2017	12		2	1	1	1	2	19	68.7%	Thomas Gyldal Petersen (A)
Data from Kmdvalg.dk 2005, 2009, 2013 and 2017

== Twin towns – sister cities ==
Herlev is twinned with:

- Eberswalde, Germany
- Gniewkowo, Poland
- Höganäs, Sweden
- Lieto, Finland
- Nesodden, Norway
- Seltjarnarnes, Iceland
- Sermersooq, Greenland

== See also ==
- Herlev Hospital
- Herlev railway station
