= Carsten Leth Schmidt =

Danish politician

Leader of Schleswig Party
- Incumbent
- Assumed office 2012
- Preceded by: Marit Jessen Rüdiger

Personal details
- Born: 3 December 1968 (age 57) Haderslev, Denmark
- Party: Schleswig Party

Carsten Leth Schmidt (born 3 December 1968 in Haderslev) is a Danish politician. He has been the leader of Schleswig Party since 2012, and has been a part of the municipal council in Haderslev Municipality since 2017. He is a farmer, and lives in the village of Sønderballe in Haderslev Municipality.

== Political career ==
Schmidt first ran in local elections in the 2005 Danish local elections, but was first elected in the 2017 elections where he entered the municipal council of Haderslev Municipality.

Political offices
Preceded by Marit Jessen Rüdiger	Leader of the Schleswig Party; 2012—	Succeeded by Incumbent
