= Morsø Municipality =

Morsø Municipality Morsø Kommune (Danish)
- Municipality
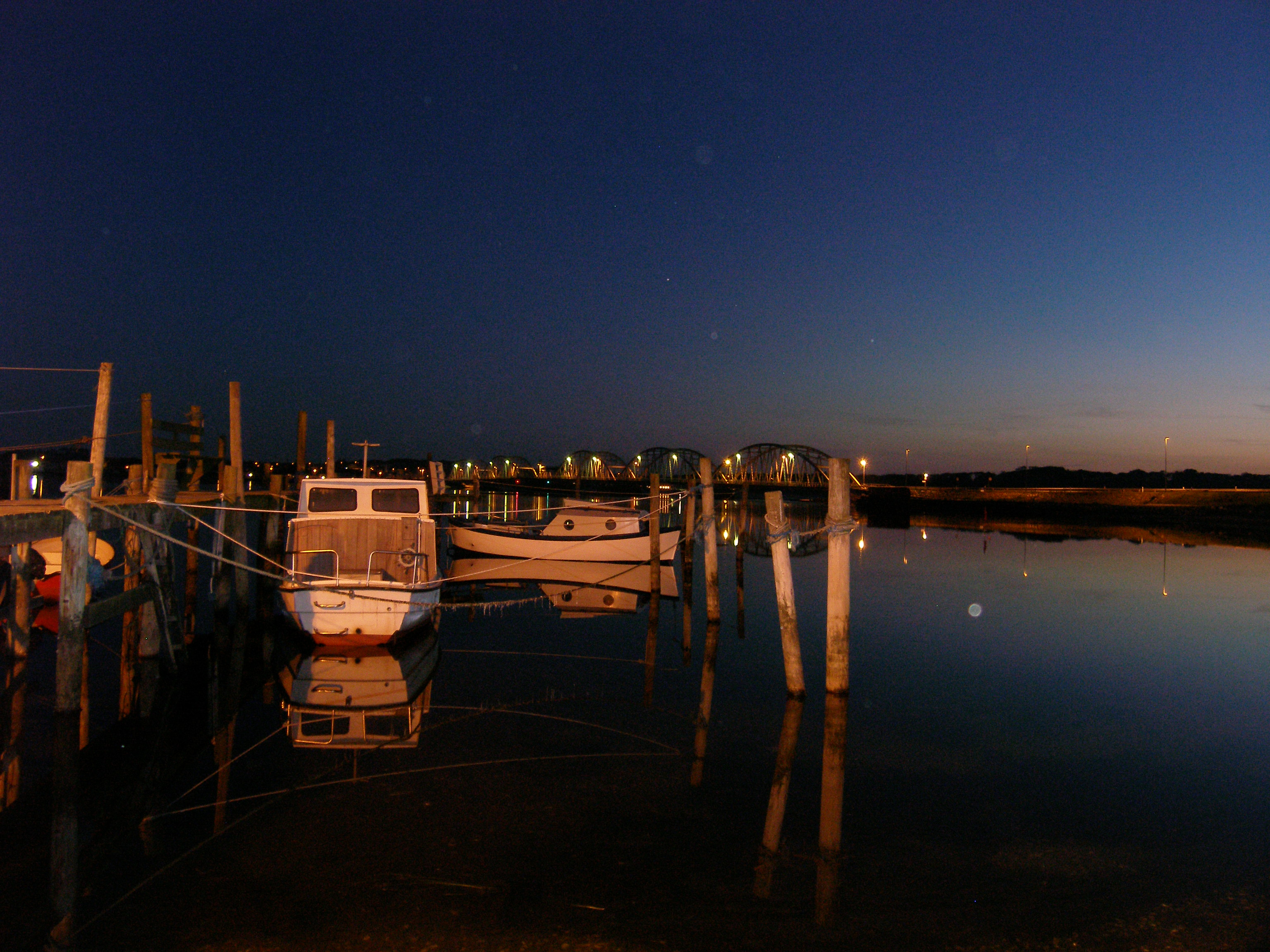
- Vildsund Øst

- Coat of arms

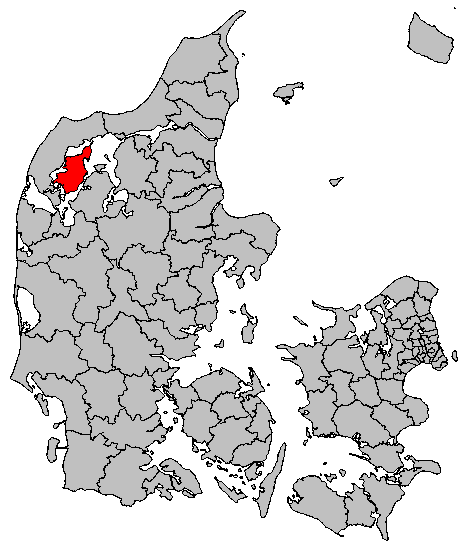
- Location in Denmark
- Coordinates: 56°47′00″N 8°45′00″E
- Country: Denmark
- Region: Nordjylland
- Established: 1 April 1970

Area
  - Total: 364.42 km^{2} (140.70 sq mi)

Population (1 January 2026)
  - Total: 19,344
  - Density: 53.082/km^{2} (137.48/sq mi)
- Time zone: UTC+1 (CET)
  - Summer (DST): UTC+2 (CEST)
- Postal code: 7900
- Website: www.morsoe.dk

Morsø Municipality (Danish: Morsø Kommune) is a municipality (Danish, kommune) in Region Nordjylland in northern Denmark. The municipality is located on the island of Morsø or Mors, an island in the Limfjord, the sound that separates the island of Vendsyssel-Thy from the rest of Jutland Peninsula. The municipality includes the smaller island of Agerø, and covers an area of 368 km^{2}. It has a total population of 19,344 (2026). Its mayor is Egon Pleidrup Poulsen, a member of the Social Democrats (Socialdemokraterne) political party.

The main town and the site of its municipal council is the town of Nykøbing Mors.

Nykøbing Mors	9,100
Øster Jølby	660
Sundby	460
Vils	430
Erslev	370
Sejerslev	310

Because Morsø municipality comprises the entirety of the island, all municipal neighbors are separated by a body of water.

The 382-metre (1,253 ft) long Vilsund Bridge (Vilsundbro) connects the municipality at the town of Sundby over the Vil Strait to the town of Vilsund Vest in Thisted municipality.

The 1,717-metre (5,633 ft) long Sallingsund Bridge, which opened on 30 May 1978, connects the municipality at the town of Nykøbing Mors over the Salling Strait to the town of Sallingsund. Before the bridge was built there was a train ferry connection over the strait from the town of Nykøbing to Glyngøre, and a car ferry connection between Pinen at Mors and Plagen at Salling (i.e. "Pinen og Plagen" meaning "the Pain and the Torment").

Morsø municipality was not merged with other municipalities by 1 January 2007 as the result of nationwide Kommunalreformen ("The Municipal Reform" of 2007).

== Politics ==
=== Municipal council ===
Morsø's municipal council consists of 21 members, elected every four years.

Below is the current council composition.

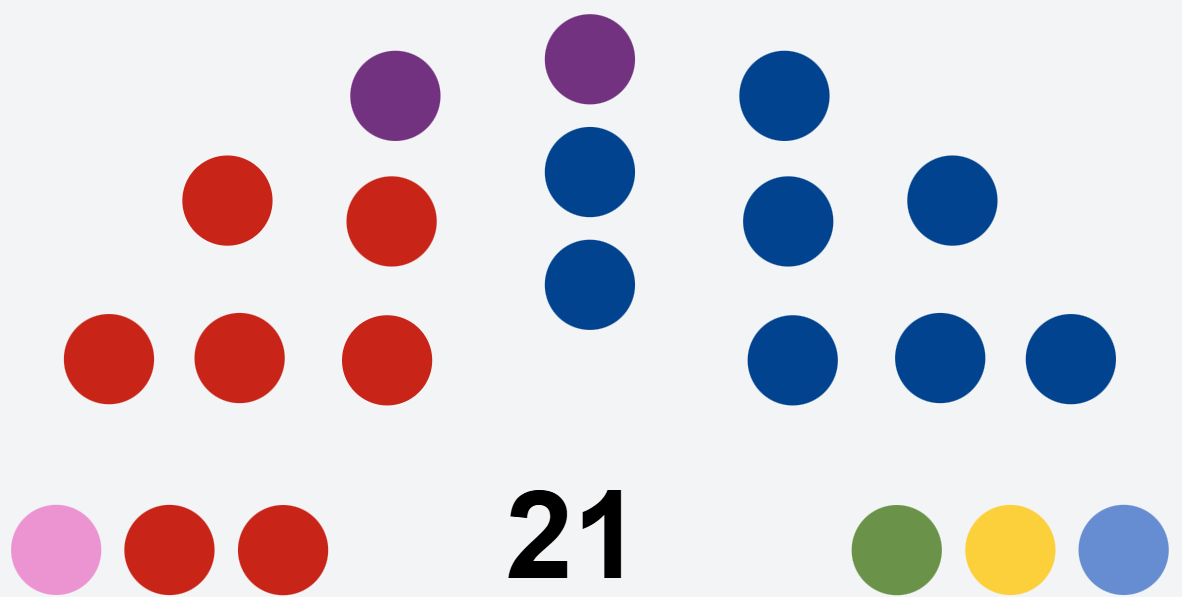

Below are the municipal councils elected between the enactment of the Municipal Reform of 2007 and the 2021 Danish local elections.

Election	Party										Total seats	Turnout	Elected mayor
Election	A	C	F	I	I	M	M	O	V	Z	Total seats	Turnout	Elected mayor
2005	10	3		3					4	1	21	76.3%	Egon Plejdrup Poulsen (A)
2009	8	2	2			1		2	6		21	73.9%	Lauge Larsen (A)
2013	7				1		4	1	8		21	80.0%	Hans Ejner Bertelsen (V)
2017	6						1	2	12		21	77.1%	Hans Ejner Bertelsen (V)
Data from Kmdvalg.dk 2005, 2009, 2013 and 2017

== Attractions ==
- Dueholm Cloister (Dueholm Kloster)
- Højris
- Jesperhus Flower Park (Jesperhus Blomsterpark)
- Moler Museum (Molermuseum)
