= John Engelhardt =

American geneticist

Dr. John Engelhardt is the director at the University of Iowa Center for Gene Therapy of Cystic Fibrosis, as well as the head of the department of anatomy and cell biology. He is known as the creator of the first cloned ferret, and for his work in finding a cure for cystic fibrosis.

== Education ==
Engelhardt got his undergraduate degree in biochemistry at Iowa State University in 1985. He then went on to get his doctorate in human genetics from Johns Hopkins University in 1990.

== Research ==
Engelhardt is most widely known for his creation of new animal models for the study of cystic fibrosis. In the 1990s he developed the human tracheal xenograft models that allowed study of humanized airways on denuded rat tracheal scaffolds. However, he soon found that there were major limitation of mouse models to study CF. He later found that the ferret represents a much better model for lung disease, and in 2006 his laboratory became the first in the world to clone ferrets.

Engelhardt's research has been geared towards finding gene therapies for cystic fibrosis. Specifically, he focuses on:

- the study of lung molecular and cellular biology as it relates to the pathogenesis and treatment of cystic fibrosis lung disease and associated diabetes
- molecular mechanisms underlying redox-mediated signal transduction in environmental injuries of the liver, and the development of molecular therapies for ischemia/reperfusion injury, sepsis, and the neurodegenerative disease amyotrophic lateral sclerosis (ALS)
- the biology of adeno-associated virus infection and the development of this vector for gene therapy of cystic fibrosis lung disease.

== Honors ==
- 1999: Philip C. and Ethel F. Ashby Lecturer, University of Oklahoma
- 2003–2006: Elected to board of directors of the American Society of Gene Therapy
- 2004: Roy J. Carver Chair in Molecular Medicine
- 2005: NIH MERIT Award (NIDDK)
- 2011: University of Iowa Graduate College Outstanding Faculty Mentor Award: Biological and Life Sciences
- 2012: University of Iowa Graduate College Fall Commencement Address
- 2012: Liupan Mountain Friendship Award, Ningxia Foreign Experts Bureau, Ningxia, P.R.C. (Commends foreign experts for their contributions to Ningxia's economic construction)
- 2015: Regents Award for Faculty Excellence, University of Iowa
- 2019: Fellow of the National Academy of Inventors
