= List of regional and local political parties in Denmark =

This list shows all local and regional political parties in Denmark since the 2007 municipal reform. Local and regional parties in Denmark are commonly knowns as local lists, citizens' lists or common lists (Danish: lokallister, borgerlister and fælleslister). Those parties are not required to follow the same formats for political parties as the ordinary parties. Furthermore, the name of the party does not have to be approved by the Ministry of Social Affairs. Local and regional parties only run for local and regional elections.

== Regional parties ==
Regional parties run only in one of the five regions of Denmark. This list includes only parties that run exclusively in regional elections, and not municipal or general elections.

=== North Denmark Region ===
Party	Seats				
Party	05	09	13	17	21
Citizens' List North Jutland (Borgerlisten Nordjylland)	1	-			

=== Central Denmark Region ===
Party	Seats				
Party	05	09	13	17	21
Society Party (Samfunds-Partiet)	-				
City Mess (Byrodet)	-				
Common List (Fælleslisten)		2	-		
Psychiatry List (Psykiatri-Listen)				1	1
Abolish Forced Classes (Afskaf Tvangsklasser)				-	

=== Region of Southern Denmark ===
Party	Seats				
Party	05	09	13	17	21
Madness Movement (Galebevægelsen)	-				
Local List Region of Southern Denmark (Lokallisten Region Syddanmark)	1	1			
Jylland First (Jylland Først)			-		
Region List (Regionslisten)			-		

=== Region Zealand ===
Party	Seats				
Party	05	09	13	17	21
Local Lists in Region Zealand (Lokallisterne i Region Sjælland)	-				
Denmark's National Socialist Movement (Danmarks Nationalsocialistiske Bevægelse)	-	-			

=== Capital Region of Denmark ===
Party	Seats				
Party	05	09	13	17	21
Humanist Party (Det Humanistiske Parti)	-				
Local List in Capital Region (Lokalliste i Region Hovedstaden)	-	-	-	-	
Family Party (Familiepartiet)	-				
Freedom Party - Glistrup's Line (Frihedspartiet - Glistrups linje)			-		
Love Party Free Christiania (Kærlighedspartiet Befri Christiania)			-		
Spandmand (Spandmand)			-		
Election Party with Mexican Theme (Valgfest med mexicansk tema)				-	
New North Zealand (Nytnordsjælland)				-	
The Sick House (Det Syge Hus)					
Odin's Viking Army (Odins Vikingehær)					
Psychiatry Focus (Psykiatrisk fokus)					

== Local parties ==
Local parties are parties that run for local elections in only a single municipality. Occasionally a local party will run in multiple municipalities geographically close to each other. Parties named after a single person with no other candidates are not listed here.

=== Albertslund Municipality ===
Party	Seats				
Party	05	09	13	17	21
Lau's List (Laus Liste)			-		
Realist Party (Realistpartiet)			-		
Albertslund Local list (Albertslund Lokalliste)				-	

=== Allerød Municipality ===
Party	Seats				
Party	05	09	13	17	21
Blovstrød List (Blovstrød Listen)	2	1	1	1	
Local List for Allerød (Lokallisten for Allerød)	1	1			
Salsa the Party (Partiet Salsa)	-				
Our Allerød (Vores Allerød)		1	2	1	
Family List (Familielisten)			-		
Citizens' Welfare (Borgerlig Velfærd)				-	
New Meal System (Ny Madordning)				-	
Feminist Initiative (Feministisk Initiativ)					

=== Assens Municipality ===
Party	Seats				
Party	05	09	13	17	21
West Funen List (Vestfyns Listen)	-				
Society Democracy (Samfunds Demokratiet)	-				
NEW TIME (NY TID)		-			
Social Conservative Assens (SocialKonservative Assens)					
We Local Democrats (Vi Lokale Demokrater)					
People's Movement Against EU (Folkebevægelsen mod EU)					
Local Nationals (De LokalNationale)					

=== Ballerup Municipality ===
Party	Seats				
Party	05	09	13	17	21
Skovlunde List (Skovlunde Listen)	-				
Ballerup List Party (Partiet Ballerup Listen)					
Serhat Kücükkart (Serhat Kücükkart)					

=== Billund Municipality ===
Party	Seats				
Party	05	09	13	17	21
New Politics - thanks (Ny Politik - tak)	-				
Citizens' List (Borgerlisten)			1	2	
The Green List (Den Grønne Liste)				-	
Local Political Forum (Lokalpolitisk Forum)					1

=== Bornholm Municipality ===
Party	Seats				
Party	05	09	13	17	21
Bornholmers' Party (Bornholmernes Parti)	-	-	-	-	
Citizens' List Bornholm (Borgerlisten Bornholm)	2	3			
Region List (Regionslisten)	5				
Free Bornholmers (Frie Bornholmere)	-				
Growth & Welfare List Bornholm (Vækst & Velfærdslisten Bornholm)			-		
Bornholm List (Bornholmerlisten)			1	1	2

=== Brøndby Municipality ===
Party	Seats				
Party	05	09	13	17	21
Democratic Socialists (Demokratiske Socialister)	1	1	-		

=== Brønderslev Municipality ===
Party	Seats				
Party	05	09	13	17	21
Citizens' List (Borgerlisten)	3		2	2	1
Brønderslev People's Party (Brønderslev Folkeparti)			-		
Hinterland List (Oplandslisten)			-		
New Brønderslev (Ny Brønderslev)			-		

=== Copenhagen Municipality ===
Party	Seats				
Party	05	09	13	17	21
Cannabis Party (Hampepartiet)	-	-	-	-	
Free Happiness (Gratis Lykke)	-	-			
Welfare List (Velfærdslisten)	-	-	-		
Cellphone Tower (Mobilmast)	-				
Young Pragmatics (De Unge Pragmatikere)	-				
The Small Man and the War Veterans (Den Lille Mand og Krigsveteranerne)	-	-	-		
Love Party (Kærlighedspartiet)	-	-	-	-	
Christiana List (Christiania-Listen)	-	-	-	-	
Bike Logical Institute (Cykel Logisk Institut)	-	-			
Sunshine Party (Sunshine Partiet)	-	-	-	-	
Democratic Community (Demokratisk Fællesskab)		-			
Shopping List (Indkøbslisten)		-			
Pear Party (Pærepartiet)		-			
Christianshavn List (Christianshavnerlisten)		-			
City List '09 (Bydelslisten '09)		-			
Gordon or Chaos Liberal Socialists (Gordon eller Kaos Lib.socialistern)		-			
High Rise (Højhuset)			-		
City Council List (Byrådslisten)			-	-	
Nature Party (Naturpartiet)			-		
Parcel House List (Parcelhuslisten)			-		
Gasværksvej List (Gasværksvejslisten)			-		
Copenhagen (Copenhagen)			-		
The Green Party (Det Grønne Parti)			-		
Lazy Robert (Dovne Robert)			-	-	
Harbour Front (Havnefronten)			-		
A Dead Horse (En Død Hest)				-	
Feminist Initiative (Feministisk Initiativ)				-	
Communists in Copenhagen (Kommunisterne i København)				-	
The Silent Majority (Det Tavse Flertal)				-	
Mythical Creature - Lifetime President (Fabeldyret - Livstidspræsident)				-	
Green Change (Grøn Omstilling)					
Copenhagen List (Københavnerlisten)					
Denmark for Everyone (Danmark for Alle)					
Quiet Revolution (Rolig Revolution)					
Sustainable Society (Bæredygtigt Samfund)					
Democratic Party (Det Demokratiske Parti)					
Party	05	09	13	17	21
Party	Seats				

=== Dragør Municipality ===
Party	Seats				
Party	05	09	13	17	21
Dragør List (DragørListen)	1				
Cross-political Community (Tværpolitisk Forening)	4	3	3	4	3
Amager List (Amagerlisten)			1		
South Amager List (Sydamagerlisten)					1
Anne Grønlund (Anne Grønlund)					

=== Egedal Municipality ===
Party	Seats				
Party	05	09	13	17	21
Egedal Local List (Egedal Lokalliste)	-				
Local List for Egedal Municipality (Lokallisten For Egedal Kommune)	-				
Citizens' List (Borgerlisten)	-				
Egedal-list (Egedal-listen)		1			
A United Egedal (Et Samlet Egedal)					
New Egedal Local List (Lokallisten Ny Egedal)					4

=== Esbjerg Municipality ===
Party	Seats				
Party	05	09	13	17	21
Emparty (Empartiet)			-		
Citizens' List (Borgerlisten)				1	
Change (Forandring)				-	
New Party (Nypartiet)				-	
Anti Marxists (Antimarxisterne)				-	
Liberal People's Party (Liberalt Folkeparti)				-	
Safe Future (Trygfremtid)				-	
Esbjerg List (Esbjerglisten)					
Party-free Society (Partifrit Samfund)					

=== Fanø Municipality ===
Party	Seats				
Party	05	09	13	17	21
Island Group (Ø-Gruppen)	1				
Environment List (Miljølisten)	3	1	2	1	
Fanø List (Fanølisten)	1				
Fanø Citizens' List (Fanø Borgerliste)		-			
Wadden Sea List (Vadehavslisten)			-	-	
Fanø Local List (Fanø Lokalliste)			1	2	
Unity (Sammenhold)				-	

=== Favrskov Municipality ===
Party	Seats				
Party	05	09	13	17	21
Favrskov List (FavrskovListen)		-			
Can we be here (Må vi være her)			-		
Waste Water List (Spildevandslisten)			-		
Joint Party Favrskov (Samlingspartiet Favrskov)					

=== Faxe Municipality ===
Party	Seats				
Party	05	09	13	17	21
Citizens' List New Faxe (Borgerlisten Ny Faxe)	-				
Faxe List (Faxelisten)	-				
Local List (Lokallisten)	5	4	4	2	1
Lightning List (Belysningslisten)		-			

=== Fredensborg Municipality ===
Party	Seats				
Party	05	09	13	17	21
Fredensborg List (Fredensborglisten)	-				
Focus Fredensborg (Focus Fredensborg)	1	1	-		
Citizens' Voice (Borgernes Stemme)			1	-	
Marie Mynche Marie Mynche					

=== Fredericia Municipality ===
Party	Seats				
Party	05	09	13	17	21
Citizen Group (Borgergruppen)	1	1	-		
Jimmy's List (Jimmys Liste)	-				
Fredericia Development (Fredericia Udvikling)		-	-		
EPolitics (EPolitik)			-		
Environment and Welfare List (Miljø- og Velfærdslisten)				-	
Free Danes (Frie Danske)					
Civic Community (Borgerligt Fællesskab)					

=== Frederiksberg Municipality ===
Party	Seats				
Party	05	09	13	17	21
Kaos (TV) List (Kaos(TV)-Listen)		-			
Our Frederiksberg (Vores Frederiksberg)		-			
Veteran Party (Veteran Partiet)		-			
Doomsday List (Dommedagslisten)		-			
Heart Party (Hjertepartiet)			-		
Frederiksberg Citizens' List (Frederiksberg Borgerliste)			-	-	
Frederiksberg People's Party (Frederiksbergsk Folkeparti)				-	
Marguis de Sade (Marguis de Sade)				-	
Hvid-sten (Hvid-sten)					
Garden Gnome Party (Havenisse-partiet)					
Bitten Vivi Jensen (Bitten Vivi Jensen)					
Love Party (Kærlighedspartiet)					

=== Frederikshavn Municipality ===
Party	Seats				
Party	05	09	13	17	21
List 2004 (Liste 2004)	-				
Municipality List (Kommunelisten)	1	-			
Citizens' List (Borgerlisten)	1				
Frederikshavn List (Frederikshavnerlisten)		-			
List for Skagen, Sæby and Frederikshavn (Listen for Skagen, Sæby og Fr.havn)			-		

=== Frederikssund Municipality ===
Party	Seats				
Party	05	09	13	17	21
Democratic Local List (Demokratisk Lokalliste)	-				
Jægerspris List (Jægersprislisten)	-				
Local List (Lokallisten)	-				
Local List (Lokal Listen)	-				
Citizens' List (Borgernes liste)			1	-	
Fjord List (Fjordlisten)			-		
United Frederikssund (Forenet Frederikssund)					
Fjord Land List (Fjordlandslisten)					1
Anja Bisp Pedersen (Anja Bisp Pedersen)					

=== Furesø Municipality ===
Party	Seats				
Party	05	09	13	17	21
Citizens' List in Værløse - STAY (Borgerlisten i Værløse - BLIV)	-				
Tabrizi List (Tabrizi-listen)	-				
Civic Liberal Farum List (Borgerlig Liberal Farumliste)	-				
Furesø List (Furesø-Listen)	1				
Citizens' List in Farum (Borgerlisten i Farum)	-				
Welfare Party (Velfærdspartiet)	1				
Renegotiation List (Genforhandlingslisten)		-			
Focus List (Fokuslisten)		1			
Local List (Lokallisten)				-	
The Free Democrats (De Frie Demokrater)				-	

=== Faaborg-Midtfyn Municipality ===
Party	Seats				
Party	05	09	13	17	21
Entirety List (Helhedslisten)	-				
Information List (Informationslisten)	-				
Faaborg List (Faaborg-Listen)	-	-			
Citizens' List (Borgerlisten)			1	-	
Freedom Party (Frihedspartiet)			-		
Local List Faaborg-Midtfyn (Lokallisten Faaborg-Midtfyn)					1
We Local Democrats (Vi Lokale Demokrater)					
Local Nationals (De LokalNationale)					

=== Gentofte Municipality ===
Party	Seats				
Party	05	09	13	17	21
Gentofte List (Gentoftelisten)	1	-	-		
Gentofte's Free (Gentoftes Frie)		-			

=== Gladsaxe Municipality ===
Party	Seats				
Party	05	09	13	17	21
List Livelihood (Liste Levebrød)	-				
Comfort List (Tryghedspartiet)		-			
List Flex (Liste Fleks)			-		
Local List Gladsaxe (Lokallisten Gladsaxe)					1
Sahar Aslani (Sahar Aslani)					

=== Glostrup Municipality ===
Party	Seats				
Party	05	09	13	17	21
Glostrup List (Glostruplisten)	-	1	-		
Community Party (Samfundspartiet)			-		
Glostrup Citizens' List (Glostrup Borgerliste)					
City List (Bylisten)					2

=== Greve Municipality ===
Party	Seats				
Party	05	09	13	17	21
Citizens' List (Borgerlisten)	-	-			
Liberal Centrum (Liberalt Centrum)	-				
Civic Liberal in Greve (Borgerliberale i Greve)			-	-	
Tune Citizens' List (Tune Borgerliste)			-	-	
Party Party (Party Parti)					

=== Gribskov Municipality ===
Party	Seats				
Party	05	09	13	17	21
Local Democratic List (Lokaldemokratisk Liste)	-	-	-		
The Open Democracy (Det Åbne Demokrati)	-				
new gribskov (nytgribskov)			4	6	4
The Green Party (Det Grønne Parti)			-		
Better Times (Bedre Tider)				-	
Young Gribskov (Ungt Gribskov)				-	
Climate Party in Gribskov (Klimapartiet i Gribskov)					
Cultural Focus (KultureltFokus)					

=== Guldborgsund Municipality ===
Party	Seats				
Party	05	09	13	17	21
Guldborgsund List (Guldborgsundlisten)	-				
Erdmann (Erdmann)	-				
Guldborgsund List (Guldborgsundlisten)	5	4	6	11	7
Madsen (Madsen)	-				
Citizens' List Guldborgsund (Borgernes Liste Guldborgsund)		1			
Sakskøbing List (Sakskøbinglisten)			-		
Citizens' List (Borgerlisten)			-	-	
Uniq (Uniq)				-	

=== Haderslev Municipality ===
Party	Seats				
Party	05	09	13	17	21
The Catfish (Havkatten)		-	-		
Coherence (Sammenhæng)					

=== Halsnæs Municipality ===
Party	Seats				
Party	05	09	13	17	21
reform list (reform-listen)	-				
Local List (Lokallisten)	-				
Vision Party (Visionpartiet)		-	-		
Ølsted List (Ølstedlisten)			-	-	
Halsnæs List (Halsnæslisten)			-		
Local List (Lokallisten)			-		
Environmental Radical Party (Det Miljø Radikale Parti)				-	

=== Hedensted Municipality ===
Party	Seats				
Party	05	09	13	17	21
Citizens' List Juelsminde (Borgerlisten-Juelsminde)	-				
Local List (Lokallisten)	1				
Social Conservatives (SocialKonservative)	-	-			
Village List (Landsbylisten)		-			
Elevator List (Elevatorlisten)					

=== Helsingør Municipality ===
Party	Seats				
Party	05	09	13	17	21
Kronborg List (Kronborglisten)	-	-	-		
Local List (Lokallisten)	-				
List Hansen (Listehansen)		-	-		
Local Democrats (Lokaldemokraterne)		1	1	1	
Cultivated Minority Movement (Kultiveret Minoritets Bevægelse)		-			
Democrats (Demokraterne)			-		
Green Social Liberals (De Grønne Socialliberale)			-		
Helsingør Citizens' List (Helsingør Borgerliste)			-		
Comfort List (Tryghedslisten)			-	-	
Free Democracy (Frit Demokrati)				-	
Bella List (Bella Listen)				-	
Project Transparency (Projekt Transparens)					

=== Herlev Municipality ===
Party	Seats				
Party	05	09	13	17	21
Herlev List (Herlevlisten)				-	
Herlev List (Herlev Listen)					

=== Herning Municipality ===
Party	Seats				
Party	05	09	13	17	21
Handicap Democrats (Handikapdemokraterne)			-	-	
Citizens' List (Borgerlisten)					2

=== Hillerød Municipality ===
Party	Seats				
Party	05	09	13	17	21
High Hillerød (Høje Hillerød)	-				
The Credible Music Party (Det Troværdige Musikparti)	-				
Common List (Fælleslisten)	1	2	2		
Petersen List (Petersen Listen)			-		

=== Hjørring Municipality ===
Party	Seats				
Party	05	09	13	17	21
Local List (Lokallisten)	9	5	2	2	
People's List (Folkelisten)			-		
Hjørring for Everyone (Hjørring for alle)					

=== Holbæk Municipality ===
Party	Seats				
Party	05	09	13	17	21
Save the Bears (Red Bjørnene)	-				
Social List (Sociallisten)		-			
Holbæk List (Holbæklisten)		-			
Local List Holbæk (Lokallisten Holbæk)			-		
Local List - all of Holbæk Municipality (Lokallisten - hele Holbæk kommune)				3	
Free Thinkers (Fritænkerne)				-	
New Holbæk (Nyt Holbæk)				-	

=== Holstebro Municipality ===
Party	Seats				
Party	05	09	13	17	21
The Honest (De Ærlige)	-				
Sputnik List (Sputniklisten)		-	-		
Democrats (Demokraterne)			-		
Citizens' List (Borgerlisten)				-	
Common List (Fælleslisten)				-	

=== Horsens Municipality ===
Party	Seats				
Party	05	09	13	17	21
Family List in Horsens (Familie-Listen i Horsens)	-				
Horsens List (Horsens Listen)	-				
Citizens' List (Borgerlisten)	-				
Communists in Horsens (Kommunisterne i Horsens)	-				
Maren Spliid Group (Maren Spliid Gruppen)		-	-	-	
Near Political People's Party (Nærpolitisk Folkeparti)		-	-	-	
Youth Party (Ungdomspartiet)			-		
Moderate Danish People (Moderate Danske Folk)				-	
Environmental List Horsens (Miljølisten Horsens)					
Free Danes (Frie Danske)					

=== Hvidovre Municipality ===
Party	Seats				
Party	05	09	13	17	21
Hvidovre List (Hvidovrelisten)	2	3	3	2	1
List T - the red-green (Liste T - de rød-grønne)	2	1			
Dansborg Democrats (Dansborg Demokraterne)			-	-	
Near Democracy Now (Nærdemokrati Nu)			-		
Local List 2650 (Lokallisten 2650)					
Communist List (Kommunistisk Liste)					

=== Høje-Taastrup Municipality ===
Party	Seats				
Party	05	09	13	17	21
Professional Social Citizens' List (Faglig Social Borgerliste)	-				
Local List Høje-Taastrup (Lokallisten Høje-Taastrup)				1	

=== Hørsholm Municipality ===
Party	Seats				
Party	05	09	13	17	21
Civic Alternative (Borgerligt Alternativ)	-	-			
Citizens' List in Hørsholm (Borgerlisten i Hørsholm)	3	2	1		
Rungsted List (Rungsted Listen)			-	-	
Hørsholm List (Hørsholmlisten)			-		
New Ways (Nye Veje)				-	
Social Conservatives (SocialKonservative)					1

=== Ikast-Brande Municipality ===
Party	Seats				
Party	05	09	13	17	21
Common List (Fælleslisten)	8	8	5	2	2
Citizens' List (Borgerlisten)		-			
Justice List (Retfærdighedslisten)		-			
Social Liberal List (Den Social-Liberale Liste)				-	

=== Ishøj Municipality ===
Party	Seats				
Party	05	09	13	17	21
Ishøj Citizens' List (Ishøj Borgerliste)	-	-			
Ishøj List (Ishøjlisten)					3
Annelise Madsen (Annelise Madsen)					1

=== Jammerbugt Municipality ===
Party	Seats				
Party	05	09	13	17	21
Local List Jammerbugt (Lokallisten Jammerbugt)	1	1	1	1	1
Environmental Guardians (Miljøvogterne)			-		

=== Kalundborg Municipality ===
Party	Seats				
Party	05	09	13	17	21
Senior List (Ældrelisten)	-				
Cross-Political Local List (Tværpolitisk Lokalliste)	1				
Local List Kalundborg (Lokallisten Kalundborg)	1	1			
Alternative List (Alternativlisten)	-				
Diversity List (Mangfoldighedslisten)			-	-	
School List (Skolelisten)				-	
Democratic Common List (Demokratisk Fællesliste)					

=== Kerteminde Municipality ===
Party	Seats				
Party	05	09	13	17	21
Citizens' List (Borgerlisten)		3	6	1	
Justice Party (Retfærdighedspartiet)		-			
The Credible (De Troværdige)			-	-	
We Green (Vi Grønne)				-	
Kerteminde List (Kertemindelisten)				-	
Free Locals (Frie Lokale)					

=== Kolding Municipality ===
Party	Seats				
Party	05	09	13	17	21
Christiansfeld List (Christiansfeldlisten)	-				
Kolding List (Kolding-Listen)	-				
Citizens' List (Borgerlisten)		-			
Vamdrup Local List (Vamdrup Lokalliste)			-		
Handicap Party (Handicappartiet)				-	
X for Kolding (Kryds for Kolding)					

=== Køge Municipality ===
Party	Seats				
Party	05	09	13	17	21
The Unpolitical Citizens' List (Den Upolitiske Borgerliste)	1				
Parents List (Forældrelisten)	-				
Solidarity (Solidaritet)	-				
Citizen Centrum (Borger Centrum)	-	-			
Democracy List (Demokratilisten)		2	-	-	
Køge List (Køge-Listen)		-			
Near-Democracy (Nær-Demokratiet)			-	-	
Heart's Party (Hjertets-Parti)			-		
New Centrum (Ny Centrum)			1		

=== Langeland Municipality ===
Party	Seats				
Party	05	09	13	17	21
Arno Kruse's List (Arno Kruses Liste)	-				
Alternative List (Alternativ Liste)	-				
Citizens' List Langeland (Borgerlisten Langeland)	12	5	4		
Langeland List (Langelandslisten)		-	-		
Culture List (Kulturlisten)		-			
Free Liberals of Langeland (Langelands Frie Liberale)				-	
Local List Langeland (Lokallisten Langeland)				-	

=== Lejre Municipality ===
Party	Seats				
Party	05	09	13	17	21
Socialist Local List (Socialistisk Lokalliste)	2				
Living Villages (Levende Landsbyer)				-	
Citizens' List New Lejre (Borgerlisten Ny Lejre)				-	

=== Lemvig Municipality ===
Party	Seats				
Party	05	09	13	17	21
Rural- and City List (Land- og Bylisten)	1				

=== Lolland Municipality ===
Party	Seats				
Party	05	09	13	17	21
Lolland List (Lollandlisten)	1				
The Citizen (Borgeren)		-			
The Free Lolland (Det Frie Lolland)			-		
Local List Lolland (Lokallisten Lolland)			1	2	1
Village List (Landsbylisten)				-	
New Lolland (Nyt Lolland)				-	
Citizens' List Lolland (Borgerlisten Lolland)				-	
Your Voice (Din Stemme)				2	2
Outskirt Denmark (Udkantsdanmark)				-	
New Lolland (Nyt Lolland)				-	
West Front (Vestfronten)					
Nakskov List (Nakskov Listen)					1

=== Lyngby-Taarbæk Municipality ===
Party	Seats				
Party	05	09	13	17	21
Citizens' List (Borgerlisten)	-				
Lyngby-Taarbæk List (Lyngby-Taarbæk Listen)	-	-			
Democratic Renewal in Lyngby-Taarbæk (Demokratisk Fornyelse i Lyngby-Taarbæk)		-			
The Locals in Lyngby-Taarbæk (De Lokale i Lyngby-Taarbæk)			-		
Lyngby-Taarbæk's Liberal List (Lyngby-Taarbæks Liberale Liste)			-		
Local List Elisabeth Stage (Lokallisten Elisabeth Stage)			-		
A Better Offer (Et Bedre Tilbud)				-	
City's Voices (Bydelenes Stemmer)				-	
Local List Our Municipality - LTK (Lokallisten Vores Kommune - LTK)					

=== Læsø Municipality ===
Party	Seats				
Party	05	09	13	17	21
Læsø Citizens' List (Læsø Borgerliste)	2	1	1		2
Læsø Citizens' List (Læsø Borgerliste)	-				
The Island's List (Øens Liste)	2				
Læsø Future (Læsø Fremtid)		-			
Læsø List (Læsø Listen)		3	2	2	
Cooperation List (Samarbejdslisten)			1		
Common List (Fælles Listen)				-	

=== Mariagerfjord Municipality ===
Party	Seats				
Party	05	09	13	17	21
Hobro List (Hobrolisten)	-				
Mariagerfjord List (Mariagerfjordlisten)	-				
Mariagerfjord List (Mariagerfjordlisten)	-				
Citizens' List Mariagerfjord (Borgerlisten Mariagerfjord)		1			
Mariagerfjord List (Mariagerfjordlisten)					

=== Middelfart Municipality ===
Party	Seats				
Party	05	09	13	17	21
Cross-Political List (Tværpolitisk Liste)	-				
Entirety List (Helhedslisten)	1	-			
Cross-Political List (Tværpolitisk Liste)	-				
Consumer and Workout List (Forbruger- og Træningslisten)			-		
PositivePlus (PositivPlus)				-	
Care List (Omsorgsgruppen)					
Cross-Political Decency (Tværpolitisk Anstændighed)					

=== Morsø Municipality ===
Party	Seats				
Party	05	09	13	17	21
Citizens' List on Mors (Borgerlisten på Mors)	3				
Morsø Environment and Nature (Morsø Miljø og Natur)	-				
Morsø List (Morsølisten)	-				
LOCAL LIST (LOKALLISTEN)		-			
MorsList (MorsListen)		1			
Democratic Balance (Demokratisk Balance)			4	1	1

=== Norddjurs Municipality ===
Party	Seats				
Party	05	09	13	17	21
Alternative Citizens' List (Den Alternative Borgerliste)	-				
Citizens' List Norddjurs (Borgerlisten Norddjurs)	3	4	2	-	
Free Danes (Frie Danske)					

=== Nordfyn Municipality ===
Party	Seats				
Party	05	09	13	17	21
Clover List (Kløverlisten)	-				
Nordfyn List (Nordfynslisten)	2	1	1		
Justice Party (Retfærdighedspartiet)	-				

=== Nyborg Municipality ===
Party	Seats				
Party	05	09	13	17	21
Citizens' List (Borgerlisten)	-				
Nyborgers (Nyborgerne)	-				
Citizens' List Democratic Nyborg (Borgerlisten Demokratisk Nyborg)			-		
People's Party Nyborg (Folkepartiet Nyborg)				-	
Citizens' List Nyborg (Borgerlisten Nyborg)				-	
We Local Democrats (Vi Lokale Demokrater)					

=== Næstved Municipality ===
Party	Seats				
Party	05	09	13	17	21
Blak List (Blaklisten)	-	-			
Næstved List (NæstvedListen)	-				
Free Pensionists (De Frie Pensionister)	-				
Youth Party (Ungdomspartiet)		-			
Welfare Party (Velfærdspartiet)			-		
New Næstved (Nyt Næstved)			-		
Children's Party (Børnenes Parti)			-	-	
NæstvedParty (NæstvedPartiet)				-	
Better schools - Better future (Bedre skoler - Bedre fremtid)				-	
Outside (Udenfor)					

=== Odder Municipality ===
Party	Seats				
Party	05	09	13	17	21
Odder Municipality List (Odder Kommuneliste)	1	-			
Culture and Environment List (Kultur- og Miljølisten)	1	1	-		
Citizens' List ( Borgerlisten)		-			
Jørgensen List (Jørgensenlisten)		-	-	-	
Alternative (Alternativet)		-			
New Danish Democracy - Agenda 3 (Nyt Dansk Demokrati - agenda 3)				-	
Global Goals on Purpose (Verdensmål med Vilje)					

=== Odense Municipality ===
Party	Seats				
Party	05	09	13	17	21
Landowner List (Grundejerlisten)	-				
Citizens' List in Odense (Borgerlisten i Odense)	-	-	-		
The Crowd (Folkeflokken)		-	-		
Core Party (Kernepartiet)		-			
Odense List (Odenselisten)		-			
The Free List (Den Frie Liste)			-	-	
Centrum List (Centrumlisten)			-		
Free Citizens (Frie Borgere)			-		
New Odense (Nyt Odense)				-	
A Better Odense (Et Bedre Odense)				-	
Free Fyn (Befri Fyn)				-	
Local List New Odense (Lokallisten Nyt Odense)					
Liberats (Liberaterne)					
Local Nationals (De LokalNationale)					

=== Odsherred Municipality ===
Party	Seats				
Party	05	09	13	17	21
Odsherred List (Odsherred-listen)	-	1	2	1	
Alternative (Alternativet)			-		
Otium Party (Otium Parti)			-		
New Odsherred (Nyt Odsherred)					4

=== Randers Municipality ===
Party	Seats				
Party	05	09	13	17	21
Resident List (Beboerlisten)	3	2	3	1	1
Environment List (Miljølisten)	-	-			
Randers List (Randers Listen)	1				
Youth List (Unge Listen)			-		
Welfare List (Velfærdslisten)			1	1	1
Defensive Middle (Defensiv Midt)				-	
Social List (Sociallisten)				-	
Fusion Randers (Fusion Randers)				-	
East Bridge (Østbroen)					2

=== Rebild Municipality ===
Party	Seats				
Party	05	09	13	17	21
Rebild List (Rebild-Listen)	1				
List Aubertin (Liste Aubertin)	-				
Common List Rebild (Fælleslisten-Rebild)	2	-			
Cross-Political List (Tværpolitisk liste)	-				
Citizens' List for Skørping Municipality (Borgerlisten for Skørping Kommune)	-				
Hinterland List (Oplandslisten)		2	2	-	
Bike Path List (Cykelsti-Listen)			-		
Social Common List - Rebild (Den Sociale Fællesliste - Rebild)			3	4	4
Straight Right (Lige Højre)					

=== Ringkøbing-Skjern Municipality ===
Party	Seats				
Party	05	09	13	17	21
Municipality List (Kommunelisten)	-				
Something Special (Noget Særligt)		-			
Fjord List (Fjordlisten)			1	1	

=== Ringsted Municipality ===
Party	Seats				
Party	05	09	13	17	21
Rural and City (Land og By)	1				
Liberal Socialists (Liberal-Socialisterne)		-			

=== Roskilde Municipality ===
Party	Seats				
Party	05	09	13	17	21
Common Sense (Sund Fornuft)	-				
Roskilde List (Roskildelisten)	-	-	-		
Larsen's Area (Larsens Plads)		-			
Michael Philip Hansen List (Michael Philip Hansen-Listen)			-		

=== Rudersdal Municipality ===
Party	Seats				
Party	05	09	13	17	21
Local List (Lokallisten)	4	4	4	3	2
Søllerød Citizens' List Nature's Friends (Søllerøds Borgerl. Naturens Venner)	-				
Rudersdal List (Rudersdallisten)	1				
Folkelisten.dk (Folkelisten.dk)			-	-	
Citizen Focus (BorgerFokus)					

=== Rødovre Municipality ===
Party	Seats				
Party	05	09	13	17	21
Lower Land Debt (Lavere Grundskyld)			-		

=== Samsø Municipality ===
Party	Seats				
Party	05	09	13	17	21
Samsø List (Samsø Listen)	1	-			
Nissen's Party (Nissens Parti)	-				
Island List (Ø-Listen)	-				
Common List Samsø (Fælleslisten Samsø)		1	1	-	
social List (Social-Listen)		-	-		

=== Silkeborg Municipality ===
Party	Seats				
Party	05	09	13	17	21
Citizens' List (Borgerlisten)	-				
Silkeborg Citizens' List (Silkeborg Borgerliste)		-			
Green Future (Grøn Fremtid)				-	
Silkeborg List (Silkeborglisten)				-	
Participant List (Deltagerlisten)				-	

=== Skanderborg Municipality ===
Party	Seats				
Party	05	09	13	17	21
Citizens' List (Borgerlisten)	-				
Justice Party (Retfærdigheds Parti)	-				
Free List (Fri-Listen)				-	
The Community (Sammenholdet)				-	

=== Skive Municipality ===
Party	Seats				
Party	05	09	13	17	21
Citizen Platform (Borgerplatform)		-	-		
Skive Area Common List (Skiveegnens Fælles Liste)		-			
Citizens' Voice (Borgernes Stemme)				-	
Skive List (Skive-Listen)				2	2

=== Slagelse Municipality ===
Party	Seats				
Party	05	09	13	17	21
Interdisciplinary Local Political List (Tværfaglig Lokalpolitisk Liste)	-	-	-	-	
Citizens' List (Borgerlisten)	1				
Green Slagelse (Det Grønne Slagelse)		-			
New Democracy (Nydemokratiet)		-	-		
Electoral Association Denmark (Vælgerforeningen Danmark)			-		
Korsør List (KorsørListen)			-		
Lotinga List (Lotinga-Listen)			-		
The Economical Local List for Pupils and Students (Den Økonomiske Lokale Liste for Elever og Studerende)			-		
Fair Balance (Fair Balance)				-	
Bridge Builders (Brobyggerne)				-	

=== Solrød Municipality ===
Party	Seats				
Party	05	09	13	17	21
Solrød List (SolrødListen)	1	1			
Havdrup List (Havdruplisten)	1	2	1	1	1
Family List (Familielisten)	-				
Landowners (Grundejerne)			2	1	
Our Solrød (VoresSolrød)					3

=== Sorø Municipality ===
Party	Seats				
Party	05	09	13	17	21
Citizens' List (Borgerlisten)	1				
Liberal Socialists (Liberalsocialisterne)	-	-		-	
Electoral Association Denmark (Vælgerforeningen Danmark)	-			-	
Independent List (Den Uafhængige Liste)	1				
Denmark's National List (Danmarks Nationale Liste)		-			
Citizen List (Medborgerlisten)		-			
Blue Renewal (Blå Fornyelse)				-	
Independents (Frigængerne)					

=== Stevns Municipality ===
Party	Seats				
Party	05	09	13	17	21
Stevns List (Stevnslisten)		2	1		
Citizens' List Stevns (Borgerlisten Stevns)				-	
New Stevns (Nyt Stevns)				2	2

=== Struer Municipality ===
Party	Seats				
Party	05	09	13	17	21
Struer-Thyholm's Future (Struer-Thyholms Fremtid)				-	
Fisherman's Slap (Fiskerlussing)					

=== Svendborg Municipality ===
Party	Seats				
Party	05	09	13	17	21
Svendborg List (Svendborglisten)	-	-			
Svendborg Local List (Svendborg Lokalliste)	1	-	1	-	
Solidaric Democracy (Solidarisk Demokrati)	-				
Cross-Socialist List in Svendborg (Tværsocialistisk liste i Svendborg)	1	1	1	-	
SG List (SG-Listen)		-			
Centrum List (Centrum Listen)		-			
Cooperation List (Samarbejdslisten)			-		
Reasonable Philosophical List (Fornuftig Filosofisk Liste)			-		
Citizens' Group (Borgersammenslutningen)			-		
Family List (Familielisten)				-	
Right (Højre)				-	
Whimsical List (Den Lunefulde Liste)					
We Local Democrats (Vi Lokale Demokrater)					
South Fyn List (Sydfynslisten)					

=== Syddjurs Municipality ===
Party	Seats				
Party	05	09	13	17	21
Citizens' List (Borgerlisten)	2	1	1		
Straight Course Djursland (Ret Kurs Djursland)	-				
Social Liberal Citizens' List (Social Liberal Borgerliste)				-	

=== Sønderborg Municipality ===
Party	Seats				
Party	05	09	13	17	21
Common List(Fælleslisten)	6	8	2	1	
Danish Smoking Party (Dansk-Rygeparti)		-	-		
Alssund List (Alssundlisten)			-		
Als Party (Alsisk Parti)			-	-	
Neo Political Area List (Nepolistisk Omegnsliste)			-		
Sønderborg List (Sønderborglisten)					

=== Thisted Municipality ===
Party	Seats				
Party	05	09	13	17	21
Citizens' List Thy (Borgerlisten Thy)	-				
Thy List (Thylisten)	-				
Growth and Welfare (Vækst og Velfærd)		-			
Nature's Voice (Naturens Stemme)		-			
Local List Thy (Lokallisten Thy)		-			
Party Thy (Partiet Thy)			-		
Green List, Truth & Justice (Grøn Liste, Sandhed & Retfærdighed)				-	
Pebbles in the Shoe (Sten i Skoen)					

=== Tønder Municipality ===
Party	Seats				
Party	05	09	13	17	21
Local List (Lokallisten)	-				
Citizen's List (Borgerlisten)				1	3
Tønder List (Tønder Listen)					9

=== Tårnby Municipality ===
Party	Seats				
Party	05	09	13	17	21
Tårnby Social Liberal List (Tårnby Socialliberale Liste)	-				
Tårnby Socialist List (Tårnby Socialistiske Liste)	-				
The Free Democrats (De Frie Demokrater)		-			
Job and Homeless Party (Job- og hjemløsepartiet)			-		
Amager Troja (Amager Troja)			-		
Tårnby List (Tårnby Listen)					1

=== Vallensbæk Municipality ===
Party	Seats				
Party	05	09	13	17	21
Gyda's List (Gydas Liste)			-		
Vallensbæk List (VallensbækListen)					

=== Varde Municipality ===
Party	Seats				
Party	05	09	13	17	21
Varde List (Vardelisten)	-				
Local List (Lokallisten)	8	2			
Local List 2017 (Lokallisten 2017)				2	
E-Citizen Group (E-Borgergruppen)					
Development List (Udviklingslisten)					

=== Vejen Municipality ===
Party	Seats				
Party	05	09	13	17	21
Local List (Lokallisten)	1	-			
Liberal Citizen's List (Liberal Borgerliste)					1

=== Vejle Municipality ===
Party	Seats				
Party	05	09	13	17	21
Citizens' List in Vejle (Borgerlisten i Vejle)	-				
Vejle List ( Vejle-Listen)	-				
Human Rights List (Menneskerettighedslisten)	-				
Local List for Vejle Hinterlands (Lokallisten for Vejle Opland)	-				
Citizens' List (Borgerlisten)		-			
Humanity List (Medmenneskelisten)		-			
Vejle Plus (Vejle Plus)				-	
Vejle Municipality First (Vejle Kommune Først)			-		
Independent Party (Uafhængige Parti)			-		
Citizens' Party (Borgernes Parti)				-	
Give List (Give Listen)				-	
Denmark First (Danmark Først)				-	
Liberal Citizen's List Vejle (Liberal Borgerliste Vejle)					

=== Vesthimmerland Municipality ===
Party	Seats				
Party	05	09	13	17	21
Citizens' List Vesthimmerland (Borgerlisten Vesthimmerland)	1				
Wish List (Ønske Listen)	-				
Alternative List (Den Alternative Liste)	-	-			
For the Municipality's Economic Restoration (For Kommunens økonomiske genoprettelse)		-			
Vesthimmerland List (VestHimmerlandsListen)				1	1
Citizens' List Vesthimmerland (Borgerlisten Vesthimmerland)				-	

=== Viborg Municipality ===
Party	Seats			
Party	05	09	13	17
List for Viborg Municipality (Listen for Viborg Kommune)			-	
Municipality List Viborg (Kommunelisten Viborg)				-

=== Vordingborg Municipality ===
Party	Seats				
Party	05	09	13	17	21
Democratic Progress (Demokratisk Fremskridt)	-		-		
Citizens' List (Borgerlisten)	-				
Citizens' List (Borgerlisten)			-	-	
Vorkommune.dk (Vorkommune.dk)				-	
Digital Democracy (Digital Demokrati)				-	
Common List (Fælleslisten)					1

=== Ærø Municipality ===
Party	Seats				
Party	05	09	13	17	21
Vision List (Visionslisten)	-				
Jørgensen's List (Jørgensens Liste)	-				
Ærø Citizens' List (Ærø Borgerliste)	2	4			
Marstal Citizens' List (Marstal Borgerliste)	-				
Ærø List (Ærølisten)	1				
ÆrøPlus (ÆrøPlus)			2	1	3
Ærø's Future (Ærøs Fremtid)			2	1	1
Openness List (Åbenhedslisten)			-		
Ærø in Centrum (Ærø i Centrum)					1

=== Aabenraa Municipality ===
Party	Seats				
Party	05	09	13	17	21
Liberal Citizens' List (Liberal Borgerliste)	-				
Robin Hood Party (Robin Hood Partiet)				-	

=== Aalborg Municipality ===
Party	Seats				
Party	05	09	13	17	21
Stop the Abuse (Stop Misbruget)	-				
Citizens' List for Aalborg Municipality (Borgerlisten for Aalborg Kommune)	-	-			
Storaalborg List (Storaalborglisten)	-				
On the Edge (På Kanten)			-		
Traffic People's Party (Trafikalt Folkeparti)			-		
Adopted (Vedtaget)			-		
Social Common List (Sociale Fælles Liste)			-	-	
Fjord List (Fjordlisten)				-	
Denmark's Vision (Danmarks Vision)					
Aalborg Defect (aalborg DeFekt)					
Traffic People's Party (Trafikalt Folkeparti)					

=== Aarhus Municipality ===
Party	Seats				
Party	05	09	13	17	21
Love Party (Kærlighedspartiet)	-				
Kako List (Kako Listen)	-				
Free Place Party (Fristedspartiet)	-				
Check List (Facitlisten)	-				
List P.I.K Money in Municipal Coffers (Liste P.I.K. Penge i Kommunekassen)	-	-			
Happiness List (Lykkelisten)	-				
Clown Your Party (Klovn Dit Parti)	-				
Wish List (Ønskelisten)	-				
Citizens' List Århus against the Mosque (Borgerlisten Århus mod Moskeen)	-				
Civilian Forum (Civilt Forum)		-			
Silver as Mayor (Silver som Borgmester)		-			
The Love People (Kærlighedsfolket)		-			
List for Independents (Liste for Enkeltpersoner)		-			
Senior Party (Seniorpartiet)			-		
Communist Common List (Kommunististisk Fællesliste)			-	-	
Authentic Politics (Autentisk Politik)			-		
Unity for Aarhus (Sammenholdet for Aarhus)				-	
Trustworthy Politics (Troværdig Politik)				-	
Well-Being and Actual Citizen Inclusion (Trivsel og Reel Borgerinddragelse)					
The Greens (De Grønne)					
Community Spirit Party (Partiet Samfundssind)					
Better Aarhus (Bedre Aarhus)					
Egalitarian People's Party (Egalitært Folkeparti)					
Party	05	09	13	17	21
Party	Seats				
