= Sonja A. Rasmussen =

- Born: Mankato, Minnesota, U.S.
- Education: University of Minnesota Duluth; University of Wisconsin–Madison; University of Florida
- Scientific career
- Fields: Pediatrics, medical genetics, epidemiology
- Workplaces: University of Florida; Centers for Disease Control and Prevention; Johns Hopkins University

Sonja Ann Rasmussen is an American pediatrician, medical geneticist, and epidemiologist who researches the impact of infections and medications in pregnancy, genetic and environmental contributors to birth defects, and the morbidity and mortality linked to genetic conditions. She is a professor at the Johns Hopkins School of Medicine.

Rasmussen was previously a professor at the University of Florida and she worked at the Centers for Disease Control and Prevention from 1998 to 2018. While at the CDC, she served as the editor-in-chief of the Morbidity and Mortality Weekly Report and was deputy director for infectious diseases.

== Life ==
Rasmussen was born in Mankato, Minnesota. She earned a B.S. in biology and mathematics, magna cum laude, from the University of Minnesota Duluth in 1981. She completed a M.S. in medical genetics at the University of Wisconsin–Madison in 1983. Rasmussen earned a M.D. with honors at the University of Florida College of Medicine in 1990. She was a resident in pediatrics at Massachusetts General Hospital from 1990 to 1993. Rasmussen completed a clinical genetics fellowship in the department of pediatrics at the University of Florida Health Science Center from 1994 to 1996.

Rasmussen was a clinical instructor in the division of genetics, department of pediatrics at the University of Florida from 1996 to 1998. She joined the Centers for Disease Control and Prevention (CDC) as a senior staff fellow in the birth defects and pediatric genetics branch in 1998, eventually rising to deputy director for infectious diseases, a role she served in from February to June 2018. From 1998 to 2011 Rasmussen worked in the National Center on Birth Defects and Developmental Disabilities. There, she contributed to a large case-control study on genetic and environmental risk factors for birth defects and to research on morbidity and mortality associated with genetic conditions. Between 2011 and 2014 she served as deputy director of the influenza coordination unit, overseeing pandemic influenza preparedness, and briefly as acting director of the office of public health preparedness and response.

From 2015 to 2018, Rasmussen was editor-in-chief of the Morbidity and Mortality Weekly Report. She was the lead author of the 2016 New England Journal of Medicine paper that established Zika virus as a cause of birth defects and held leadership roles in several CDC emergency responses, including the 2009 swine flu pandemic, H7N9 influenza, Middle East respiratory syndrome (MERS), Ebola, and Zika.

In July 2018, Rasmussen returned to her alma mater as a professor in the pediatric and epidemiology departments at the University of Florida College of Medicine and College of Public Health and Health Professions for four years. In October 2020, while working as a University of Florida Health physician, she joined the CDC Committee on Equitable Allocation of Vaccine for the Novel Coronavirus. Rasmussen incorporated genomics into clincal practice as director of the university's precision health program.

Rasmussen joined the Johns Hopkins School of Medicine faculty as a professor in the department of genetic medicine. Rasmussen's research examines the impact of infections and medications in pregnancy, genetic and environmental contributors to birth defects, and the morbidity and mortality linked to genetic conditions.
