= Henning G. Jensen =

Danish politician

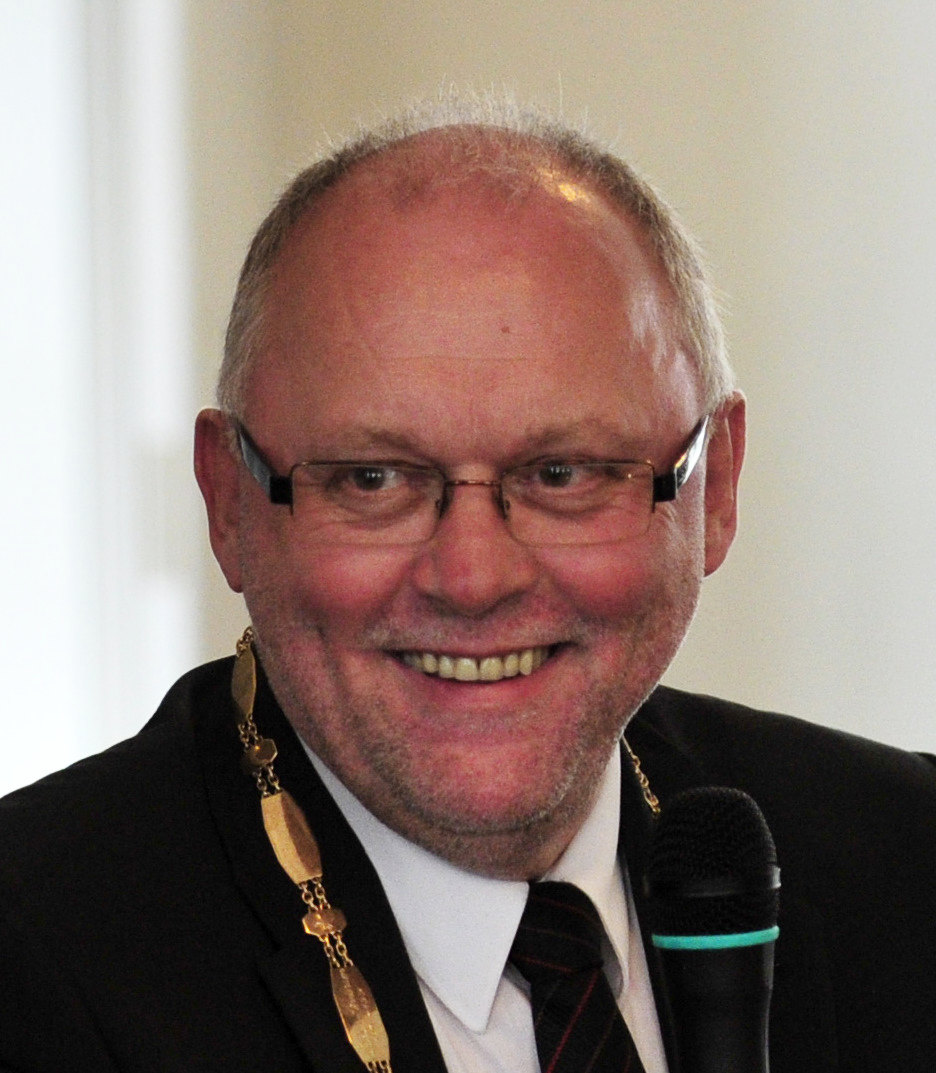
Henning G. Jensen in May 2010.

Henning G. Jensen (born 18 March 1950) was mayor in Aalborg Municipality 1998–2013, elected for the Danish Social Democrats.

Henning G. Jensen is educated as school teacher from Aalborg teachers' college. 1974–2014 he was member of Aalborg Municipal council. From 1982 to 1997 he was alderman for the Social- and health administration in Aalborg Municipality, until he in 1998 became mayor.

At the municipal election in 2005 he got 13,650 personal votes, which was about 14 percent of all registered votes in Aalborg Municipality.
