= Kim Valentin =

Danish politician

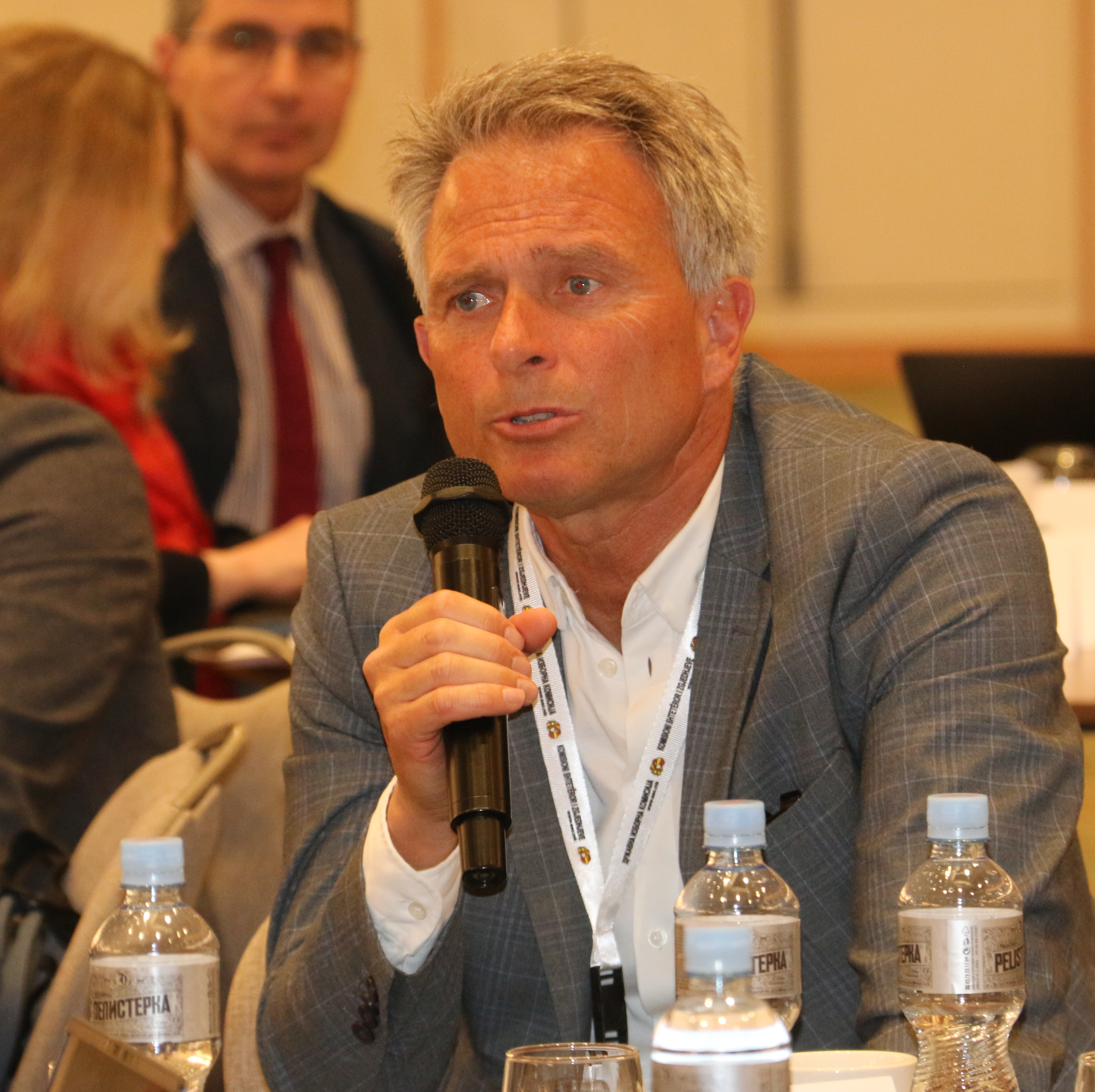
- Kim Valentin in 2024

Member of the Folketing
- Incumbent
- Assumed office 5 June 2019
- Constituency: Greater Copenhagen

Personal details
- Born: 19 March 1963 (age 63) Rødovre, Denmark
- Party: Venstre

Kim Valentin (born 19 March 1963) is a Danish politician, who is a member of the Folketing for the Venstre political party. He was elected into parliament at the 2019 Danish general election.

== Political career ==
Valentin was elected into the municipal council of Gribskov Municipality at the 2005 Danish local elections and has sat in the municipal council since. He was elected into national parliament in the 2019 election, where 3,448 votes were cast for him. Although he was initially not re-elected at the 2022 Danish general election, Karen Ellemann resigned shortly after her election and Valentin replaced her, thus keeping his seat in the Folketing.
