= Carsten Kissmeyer =

Danish politician

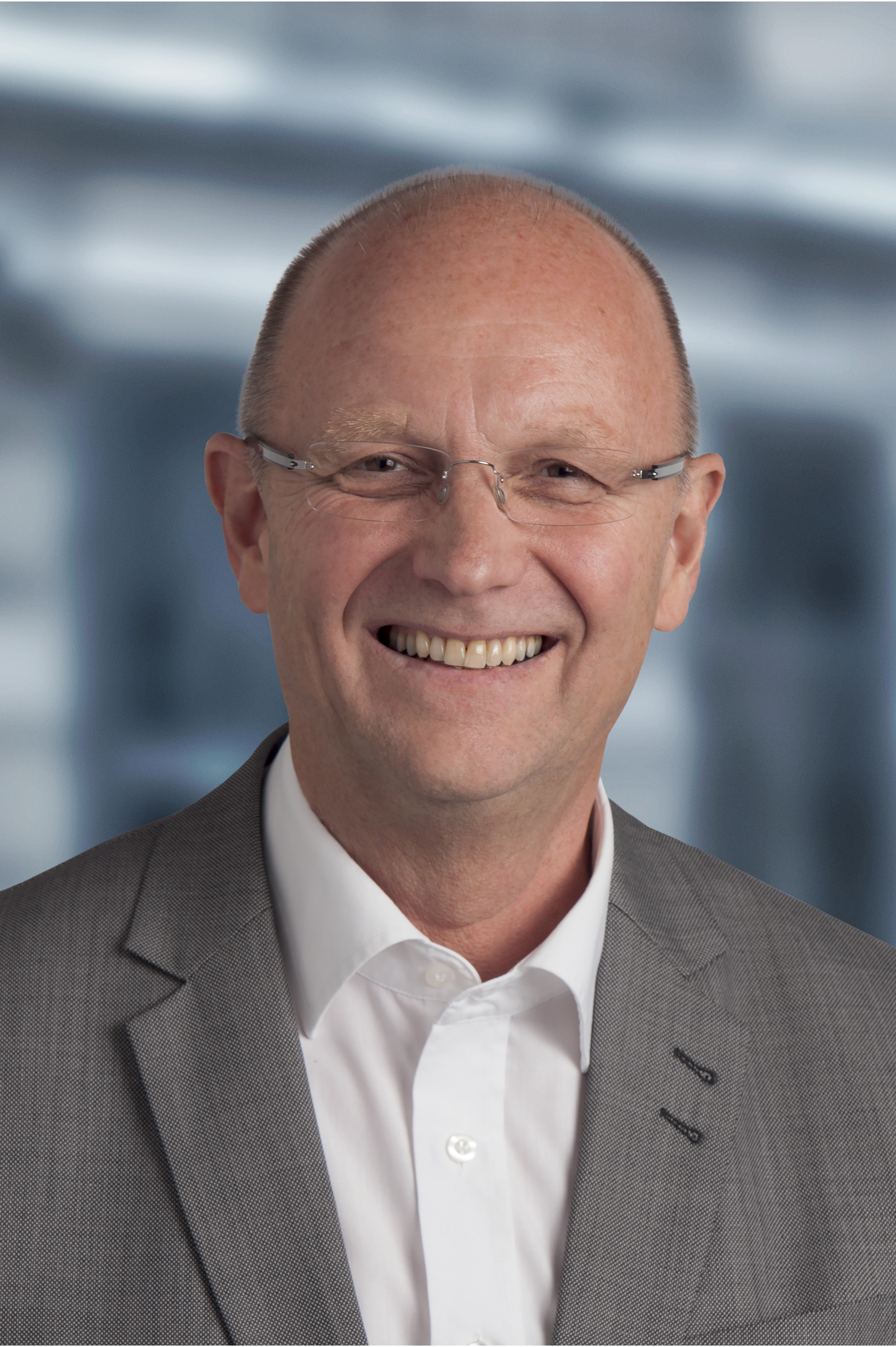
- Kissmeyer

Member of the Folketing
- Incumbent
- Assumed office 2 October 2018
- Constituency: West Jutland

Mayor of Ikast-Brande Municipality
- In office 1 January 2007 – 31 December 2017
- Succeeded by: Ib Boye Lauritsen (V)

Mayor of Ikast Municipality
- In office 1 January 2002 – 31 December 2006
- Preceded by: Kjeld Broberg Lind (V)

Personal details
- Born: 22 May 1953 (age 72) Roskilde, Denmark
- Party: Venstre

Carsten Kissmeyer (born 22 May 1953, in Roskilde) is a Danish politician, who is a member of the Folketing for the Venstre political party. He entered parliament in 2018 after Esben Lunde Larsen resigned his seat.

== Political career ==
Kissmeyer was a member of the municipal council of Ikast Municipality from 1994 to 2007 where the municipality was merged with Brande and Nørre-Snede Municipality to form Ikast-Brande Municipality. Kissmeyer was also the mayor of Ikast Municipality from 2002 to 2007. He was reelected into the new municipal council, and remained as mayor from the municipality's foundation in 2007 to 2018. In 2018, he entered the regional council of the Central Denmark Region.

Kissmeyer had run for parliament in the 2015 Danish general election, but did not get elected, receiving 4,567 personal votes. He became Venstre's secondary substitute in the West Jutland constituency, after Mads Rørvig. When Esben Lunde Larsen resigned his seat on 2 October 2018, Mads Rørvig was initially going to take over the seat, being Venstre's primary substitute in the constituency. Rørvig declined, not wanting to leave his job. The position was then offered to the secondary substitute, which was Carsten Kissmeyer. Kissmeyer ran again in the 2019 election and was elected directly into parliament with 7,245 votes.
