= Nils Borring =

Danish politician

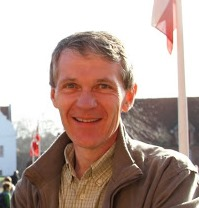

Mayor of Favrskov Municipality
- Incumbent
- Assumed office 1 January 2010
- Preceded by: Anders G. Christensen

Personal details
- Born: 24 February 1959 (age 67) Hammel, Kingdom of Denmark
- Party: Social Democrats (Denmark)

Nils Borring Sørensen (born 24 February 1959) is a Danish politician. He is a member of the Danish Social Democrats, and was mayor in Favrskov Municipality from 2010 to 2021.

He is educated as a Public school teacher and has worked as a public school librarian.

He was elected in the Hammel Byråd in 1996, and has been a member of Favrskov Municipality council since 2006.
