= Johnny Søtrup =

Danish politician

Johnny Søtrup (born 21 July 1949) is a Danish politician. A member of Venstre, Denmark's Liberal Party, he has been mayor of Esbjerg since 1994.

== Career as Esbjerg's mayor ==
In 1994, against all expectations, Søtrup was elected mayor of Esbjerg in the southwest of Jutland, Denmank, toppling the well established Social Democrats and heading 16 members of the Venstre party on the city council. In July 1999, Søtrup hit the headlines as he returned from Athens with an Olympic torch as Esbjerg hosted the summer edition of the European Youth Olympic Days. In November 1999, he oversaw the transfer of Esbjerg Harbour to Esbjerg Municipality. Under Søtrup's mayoralty, in 2003 work began on the extension of the Esbjerg Sports Park ( Esbjerg Idrætspark), including the construction of a stadium stand seating 3,500.

In 2004, Søtrup expressed satisfaction at the city council's approval of Esbjerg's gigantic Dokken project with a conference centre and a 125-meter tower which would be Denmark's tallest building. He was also delighted to hear in May 2006, as a result of its strong support for talented young people, Esbjerg had been selected by Jyllands-Posten as Danish City of the Year. The city had also received the award in 1997.

Søtrup's city council decided to further improve Esbjerg's sports facilities in 2008 with the allocation of DKK 105 million for a new football stadium accommodating 18,000. Søtrup qualified the design as Denmark's finest. In 2009, Søtrup embarked on his fifth term as mayor, consolidating his position and his success in bringing culture and jobs to the city of Esbjerg. He suffered a heart attack in August 2011 and was hospitalized in Odense. He was soon back at work, encouraging the establishment of off-shore and wind-turbine firms in the area with the promise of new jobs. By contrast, he experienced one of his most difficult days in May 2012 when Danish Crown announced the closure of its Esbjerg meat-packaging plant affecting 500 employees.

The municipal elections in November 2013 brought Søtrup further success when he received 10,677 personal votes, some 8,000 more than John Snedker, his Social Democrat rival.
