= H.C. Østerby =

Danish politician (born 1955)

Mayor of Holstebro Municipality
- Incumbent
- Assumed office 1 January 2010
- Preceded by: Arne Lægaard (V)

Personal details
- Born: 20 December 1955 (age 70)
- Party: Social Democrats

Hans Christian Østerby (born 20 December 1955) is a Danish politician and the current and second Mayor of Holstebro Municipality. He is a member of the Danish Social Democrats, and he succeeded the former and first mayor Arne Lægaard (V) on 1 January 2010.
