= Communist Party in Denmark (disambiguation) =

The Communist Party in Denmark was a Marxist–Leninist party in Denmark between 1990–2023.

Communist Party in Denmark may also refer to:

- Communist Party of Denmark, formed in 1919
- Communist Party of Denmark/Marxist–Leninists, from 1978–2006
- Communist Party (Denmark), formed in 2006

== See also ==
- Young Communist League of Denmark (1999), formed in 1999
