= 2021 Ballerup municipal election =

← 2017	16 November 2021	2025 →

All 25 seats to the Ballerup Municipal Council 10 seats needed for a majority
- Turnout: 25,300 (65.9%) ▼4.3pp
	First party	Second party	Third party
	A	C	V
Party	Social Democrats	Conservatives	Venstre
Last election	16 seats, 58.6%	1 seat, 4.6%	3 seats, 10.6%
Seats won	13	3	2
Seat change	▼3	▲2	▼1
Popular vote	12,637	3,099	1,895
Percentage	50.8%	12.4%	7.6%
Swing	▼7.8%	▲7.8%	▼3%
	Fourth party	Fifth party	Sixth party
	F	Ø	O
Party	Green Left	Red–Green Alliance	Danish People's Party
Last election	1 seat, 3.0%	2 seats, 5.9%	2 seats, 9.4%
Seats won	2	2	1
Seat change	▲1	0	▼1
Popular vote	1,758	1,605	1,135
Percentage	7.1%	6.4%	4.6%
Swing	▲4.1%	▲0.5%	▼4.8%
	Seventh party	Eighth party
	B	D
Party	Social Liberals	New Right
Last election	0 seats, 2.7%	0 seats, 1.8%
Seats won	1	1
Seat change	▲1	▲1
Popular vote	1,033	799
Percentage	4.2%	3.2%
Swing	▲1.5%	▲1.4%
Mayor before election
Jesper Würtzen
Social Democrats
Mayor after election
Jesper Würtzen
Social Democrats

Ever since 1952, the Social Democrats had held the mayor's position. Since at least the 1981 election they had also won an absolute majority to the council.

In the 2017 election they had won 16 seats, and this made it easy for Jesper Würtzen to continue for a third full term. . (Note: He was also mayor from 2012-2013, after taking over from Ove Ejnar Dalsgaard)

In this election, the Social Democrats would have its worst election result since 1981. However they were still extremely strong in the Municipality, and won 13 seats with 50.8% of the vote. Therefore Jesper Würtzen looked set to continue as mayor. This would eventually be confirmed.

== Electoral system ==
For elections to Danish municipalities, a number varying from 9 to 31 are chosen to be elected to the municipal council. The seats are then allocated using the D'Hondt method and a closed list proportional representation. Ballerup Municipality had 19 seats in 2021

Unlike in Danish General Elections, in elections to municipal councils, electoral alliances are allowed.

== Electoral alliances ==
=== Electoral Alliance 1 ===
Party		Political alignment
B	Social Liberals	Centre to Centre-left
C	Conservatives	Centre-right
I	Liberal Alliance	Centre-right to Right-wing
V	Venstre	Centre-right

=== Electoral Alliance 2 ===
Party		Political alignment
D	New Right	Right-wing to Far-right
O	Danish People's Party	Right-wing to Far-right

=== Electoral Alliance 3 ===
Party		Political alignment
F	Green Left	Centre-left to Left-wing
G	Vegan Party	Single-issue
L	Serhat Kücükkart	Local politics
Ø	Red–Green Alliance	Left-wing to Far-Left

== Results by polling station ==
L = Serhat Kücükkart
P = Partiet Ballerup Listen

Division	A	B	C	D	F	G	I	L	O	P	V	Æ	Ø
Division	%	%	%	%	%	%	%	%	%	%	%	%	%
Tapeten	57.4	3.2	9.7	3.6	6.4	0.8	0.6	1.1	5.8	0.5	6.2	0.5	4.3
Baltorpskolen - Rugvænget	53.7	2.3	9.2	3.9	7.3	0.8	0.8	1.6	5.9	0.8	6.4	0.7	6.4
Skovvejens Skole - Vest	46.1	3.8	16.7	4.1	7.4	0.8	0.9	0.3	4.4	0.3	10.0	0.3	5.0
Grantoftehallen	54.9	2.5	7.8	4.3	8.0	0.6	0.4	4.7	5.6	0.7	5.4	0.7	4.4
Egebjerghallen	43.6	5.2	15.9	2.8	9.7	1.4	1.0	0.4	2.6	0.4	10.1	0.3	6.6
Måløv Ny Hal	48.0	4.7	16.4	2.5	5.4	0.8	0.9	0.6	3.2	0.2	8.7	0.5	8.1
Skovlunde Skole - Lundebjerg	54.1	4.6	9.8	3.4	5.9	0.7	0.9	0.4	5.8	1.3	5.8	0.5	6.8
Idrætshallen	50.2	6.1	14.1	2.2	7.3	0.7	0.8	0.1	3.4	0.7	10.0	0.2	4.2
Østerhøjhallen	43.6	5.4	15.3	2.0	7.1	1.1	0.5	0.4	3.5	0.2	6.5	0.2	14.1

== Results ==
Party		Votes	%	+/-	Seats	+/-
Ballerup Municipality
A	Social Democrats	12,637	50.78	-7.83	13	-3
C	Conservatives	3,099	12.45	+7.90	3	+2
V	Venstre	1,895	7.61	-2.94	2	-1
F	Green Left	1,758	7.06	+4.03	2	+1
Ø	Red-Green Alliance	1,605	6.45	+0.56	2	0
O	Danish People's Party	1,135	4.56	-4.86	1	-1
B	Social Liberals	1,033	4.15	+1.46	1	+1
D	New Right	799	3.21	+1.40	1	+1
L	Serhat Kücükkart	254	1.02	New	0	New
G	Vegan Party	212	0.85	New	0	New
I	Liberal Alliance	193	0.78	-0.61	0	0
P	Partiet Ballerup Listen	154	0.62	New	0	New
Æ	Freedom List	112	0.45	New	0	New
Total		24,886	100	N/A	25	N/A
Invalid votes		114	0.30	+0.10		
Blank votes		300	0.78	-0.02		
Turnout		25,300	65.88	-4.28		
Source: valg.dk
