= 2021 Central Denmark regional election =

- 16 November 2021

All 41 seats to the Central Denmark regional Council 21 seats needed for a majority
- Turnout: 734,036 (67.8%) ▼3.6pp
	First party	Second party	Third party
	A	V	C
Party	Social Democrats	Venstre	Conservatives
Last election	15 seats, 33.8%	13 seats, 29.5%	1 seat, 3.4%
Seats won	13	11	6
Seat change	▼2	▼2	▲5
Popular vote	205,961	173,353	84,847
Percentage	29.3%	24.7%	12.1%
Swing	▼4.5%	▼4.8%	▲8.7%
	Fourth party	Fifth party	Sixth party
	F	Ø	B
Party	Green Left	Red–Green Alliance	Social Liberals
Last election	2 seats, 5.4%	2 seats, 4.6%	1 seat, 4.1%
Seats won	3	2	2
Seat change	▲1	0	▲1
Popular vote	50,693	42,904	35,422
Percentage	7.2%	6.1%	5.0%
Swing	▲1.8%	▲1.5%	▲0.9%
	Seventh party	Eighth party	Ninth party
	O	D	K
Party	Danish People's Party	New Right	Christian Democrats
Last election	3 seats, 8.0%	0 seats, 0.8%	1 seat, 1.8%
Seats won	1	1	1
Seat change	▼2	▲1	0
Popular vote	27,785	25,778	19,019
Percentage	4.0%	3.7%	2.7%
Swing	▼4.0%	▲2.9%	▲0.9%
Chairperson before election
Anders Kühnau
Social Democrats
Chairperson after election
Anders Kühnau
Social Democrats

The 2021 Central Denmark regional election was held on November 16, 2021, to elect the 41 members to sit in the regional council for the Central Denmark Region, in the period of 2022 to 2025.

Ever since the creation of the 5 Danish regions in the 2007 Municipal reform, the Social Democrats has been the largest party and held the chairperson's seat for Central Denmark. Following the 2017 election, Anders Kühnau had won his first term as the new chairperson, taking over from Bent Hansen who had been the chairperson in the first three terms of the region.

The election result saw both the traditional blocs with 20 seats. The single-issue party Psychiatry List could therefore become the possible kingmakers. However it was announced the next morning that multiple parties had given support for a second term for Anders Kühnau, the parties were the Social Democrats, Social Liberals, the Conservatives, Green Left, Christian Democrats, Psychiatry List and Red–Green Alliance.

== Electoral Alliances ==
Electoral Alliance 1

Party		Political Position
A	Social Democrats	Centre-left
B	Social Liberals	Centre to Centre-left
F	Green Left	Centre-left to Left-wing
Ø	Red–Green Alliance	Left-wing to Far-left

Electoral Alliance 2

Party		Political Position
C	Conservatives	Centre-right
I	Liberal Alliance	Centre-right to Right-wing
K	Christian Democrats	Centre to Centre-right

Electoral Alliance 3

Party		Political Position
D	New Right	Right-wing
O	Danish People's Party	Right-wing
V	Venstre	Centre-right
Z	Progress Party	Far-right

Electoral Alliance 4

Party		Political Position
G	Vegan Party	Centre-left to Left-wing
P	Psychiatry List	Local Politics
Å	The Alternative	Centre-left to Left-wing

== Results by constituencies and municipalities ==
This is a list of results of the following parties
A = Social Democrats
B = Social Liberals
C = Conservatives
D = New Right
F = Green Left
G = Vegan Party
I = Liberal Alliance
K = Christian Democrats
O = Danish People's Party
P = Psychiatry List
R = Kommunisterne
U = Jacob Sejersgaard-Jacobsen
V = Venstre
Z = Progress Party
Æ = Freedom List
Ø = Red–Green Alliance
Å = The Alternative

=== Constituencies ===
Division	A	B	C	D	F	G	I	K	O	P	R	U	V	Z	Æ	Ø	Å
Division	%	%	%	%	%	%	%	%	%	%	%	%	%	%	%	%	%
West Jutland	26.1	3.4	12.4	3.6	5.4	0.2	1.4	4.6	3.9	1.0	0.1	0.0	33.6	0.2	0.4	3.2	0.5
East Jutland	31.4	6.1	11.9	3.7	8.4	0.4	1.9	1.5	4.0	2.5	0.1	0.0	18.8	0.1	0.2	8.0	1.0

=== Municipalities ===
Division	A	B	C	D	F	G	I	K	O	P	R	U	V	Z	Æ	Ø	Å
Division	%	%	%	%	%	%	%	%	%	%	%	%	%	%	%	%	%
Lemvig	14.4	4.3	4.0	4.7	15.7	0.1	1.4	2.7	2.7	0.5	0.1	0.0	47.3	0.1	0.3	1.5	0.1
Struer	33.3	3.5	6.2	3.9	5.2	0.1	1.9	2.4	3.0	0.8	0.1	0.0	36.7	0.1	0.4	1.9	0.2
Skive	33.9	3.8	7.9	3.8	5.7	0.2	1.1	1.3	3.7	1.0	0.0	0.0	34.1	0.1	0.7	2.5	0.2
Viborg	28.8	2.4	22.1	2.8	4.5	0.2	1.3	1.5	4.7	1.0	0.0	0.0	25.4	0.1	0.5	3.3	1.4
Silkeborg	23.3	3.6	13.7	3.6	6.1	0.3	1.5	2.6	2.5	1.4	0.1	0.0	33.9	0.1	0.3	6.4	0.7
Ikast-Brande	25.9	1.8	21.3	4.6	3.1	0.2	1.2	3.5	6.5	0.8	0.0	0.0	28.1	0.3	0.3	2.2	0.3
Herning	24.3	3.1	9.2	3.6	4.5	0.1	1.7	5.9	3.6	1.0	0.0	0.0	39.8	0.2	0.3	2.4	0.3
Holstebro	31.2	6.7	6.9	3.3	5.7	0.1	1.3	3.0	4.5	0.9	0.1	0.0	33.0	0.1	0.2	2.8	0.3
Ringkøbing-Skjern	19.2	2.0	7.8	4.1	4.4	0.1	1.2	17.9	4.4	0.8	0.0	0.0	35.4	0.4	0.2	1.8	0.2
Aarhus	27.0	9.1	13.2	2.9	11.0	0.6	2.2	1.4	2.5	3.5	0.1	0.0	13.7	0.0	0.2	11.1	1.3
Norddjurs	43.1	2.1	9.2	5.4	5.6	0.2	3.2	0.8	5.7	1.0	0.1	0.0	18.5	0.2	0.2	4.2	0.4
Syddjurs	32.5	3.8	12.0	4.6	7.9	0.3	1.0	0.7	3.8	2.3	0.1	0.0	21.7	0.1	0.2	7.0	1.8
Randers	38.9	3.0	9.6	4.4	5.3	0.3	1.6	1.7	6.5	1.7	0.1	0.0	21.6	0.2	0.4	4.6	0.4
Favrskov	34.3	3.9	12.7	4.2	4.8	0.3	1.3	1.2	3.7	1.8	0.1	0.0	26.0	0.2	0.1	4.9	0.5
Odder	33.5	5.8	9.1	3.3	9.4	0.3	0.9	1.3	2.3	1.6	0.1	0.1	20.6	0.1	0.2	10.8	0.5
Samsø	16.8	1.4	12.1	1.4	38.2	0.4	0.7	0.2	2.3	1.0	0.1	0.0	17.6	0.1	0.3	7.0	0.5
Skanderborg	30.3	6.0	12.7	4.1	7.9	0.2	2.0	1.0	3.8	2.2	0.1	0.0	22.1	0.1	0.2	6.2	1.2
Horsens	37.2	3.9	10.6	4.0	5.5	0.3	2.1	1.1	5.2	1.5	0.1	0.0	22.0	0.1	0.2	5.9	0.4
Hedensted	29.0	2.1	9.4	5.1	3.2	0.2	1.7	5.4	7.9	0.8	0.0	0.0	31.5	0.2	0.1	2.9	0.3

== Results ==
Party		Votes	%	+/-	Seats	+/-
Central Denmark Region
A	Social Democrats	205,961	29.32	-4.34	13	-2
V	Venstre	173,353	24.68	-5.32	11	-2
C	Conservatives	84,847	12.08	+8.68	6	+5
F	Green Left	50,693	7.22	+1.83	3	+1
Ø	Red-Green Alliance	42,904	6.11	+1.62	2	0
B	Social Liberals	35,422	5.04	+0.95	2	+1
O	Danish People's Party	27,785	3.96	-3.98	1	-2
D	New Right	25,778	3.67	+2.89	1	+1
K	Christian Democrats	19,019	2.71	+0.92	1	0
P	Psychiatry List	13,196	1.88	-0.99	1	0
I	Liberal Alliance	12,138	1.73	-0.96	0	-1
Å	The Alternative	5,585	0.80	-1.45	0	-1
G	Vegan Party	2,136	0.30	New	0	New
Æ	Freedom List	1,913	0.27	New	0	New
Z	Progress Party	899	0.13	-0.11	0	0
R	Kommunisterne	609	0.09	-0.01	0	0
U	Jacob Sejersgaard-Jacobsen	149	0.02	New	0	New
Total		702,387	100	N/A	41	N/A
Invalid votes		2,886	0.27	+0.08		
Blank votes		28,763	2.71	+0.08		
Turnout		734,036	69.12	-3.59		
Source: valg.dk
