= 2025 Eastern Denmark regional election =

- 18 November 2025

All 47 seats to the Eastern Denmark regional council 24 seats needed for a majority
- Turnout: 1,508,206 (70.1%) ▲4.7%
| | First party | Second party | Third party |
|---|---|---|---|
| | A | C | F |
| Party | Social Democrats | Conservatives | Green Left |
| Last election | 26.8% | 17.9% | 8.6% |
| Seats won | 10 | 7 | 6 |
| Seat change | New | New | New |
| Popular vote | 295,178 | 195,169 | 170,100 |
| Percentage | 20.4% | 13.5% | 11.7% |
| Swing | ▼6.4% | ▼4.4% | ▲3.2% |
| | Fourth party | Fifth party | Sixth party |
| | O | Ø | V |
| Party | Danish People's Party | Red-Green Alliance | Venstre |
| Last election | 4.3% | 10.7% | 14.0% |
| Seats won | 5 | 5 | 5 |
| Seat change | New | New | New |
| Popular vote | 156,055 | 149,143 | 149,014 |
| Percentage | 10.8% | 10.3% | 10.3% |
| Swing | ▲6.5% | ▼0.5% | ▼3.7% |
| | Seventh party | Eighth party | Ninth party |
| | B | I | Æ |
| Party | Social Liberals | Liberal Alliance | Denmark Democrats |
| Last election | 8.1% | 1.9% | Did not stand |
| Seats won | 4 | 3 | 1 |
| Seat change | New | New | New |
| Popular vote | 133,747 | 86,130 | 39,919 |
| Percentage | 9.2% | 5.9% | 2.8% |
| Swing | ▲1.1% | ▲4.1% | New |
chair after election
Lars Gaardhøj
Social Democrats

The 2025 Eastern Denmark Regional election was held on 18 November 2025, to elect the 47 members to sit in the regional council for the Eastern Denmark Regional council, in the period of 2026 to 2029. Lars Gaardhøj from the Social Democrats, incumbent chair of the capital region would take the chair.

== Background ==
Since their establishment in 2007, Denmark's five regions have been the subject of ongoing political debate. In June 2024, the government's Health Structure Commission proposed three models for reorganizing the healthcare system—two of which involved abolishing the regions entirely. Ultimately, the regions were retained, though reforms were introduced, including changes to the structure of the regional councils.

From the first election in 2005 through to the 2021 election, each of the five regional councils consisted of 41 members. Following the reform, three regions retained their existing boundaries and continued unchanged. The remaining two, Region Zealand and the Capital Region of Denmark, were merged to form a new administrative entity.

The new region, named Eastern Denmark, held its first election in 2025, while the councillors will not take office until 2027.

Former leader of the Danish People's Party, Pia Kjærsgaard, would run in this election.

== 2021 Results in the former regions and notional results for the new region ==
2021 Zealand Regional Election Results

| Party | Votes | % | Seats |
|---|---|---|---|
| Social Democrats | 152,243 | 35.3 | 15 |
| Venstre | 91,027 | 21.1 | 10 |
| Conservatives | 50,917 | 11.8 | 5 |
| Green Left | 29,882 | 6.9 | 3 |
| Danish People's Party | 25,831 | 5.9 | 2 |
| Red–Green Alliance | 24,067 | 5.6 | 2 |
| New Right | 22,862 | 5.3 | 2 |
| Danish Social Liberal Party | 15,810 | 3.7 | 2 |
| Liberal Alliance | 7,503 | 1.7 | 0 |
| The Alternative | 1,439 | 0.3 | 0 |
| Total | 431,166 | 100.0 | 41 |
Source: KMD Valg

2021 Capital of Denmark Regional Election Results

| Party | Votes | % | Seats |
|---|---|---|---|
| Conservatives | 190,020 | 20.7 | 10 |
| Social Democrats | 209,111 | 22.8 | 9 |
| Red–Green Alliance | 120,907 | 13.2 | 6 |
| Venstre | 98,148 | 10.7 | 5 |
| Social Liberals | 93,528 | 10.2 | 5 |
| Green Left | 85,602 | 9.3 | 4 |
| Danish People's Party | 31,636 | 3.5 | 1 |
| New Right | 28,686 | 3.1 | 1 |
| Liberal Alliance | 17,963 | 2.0 | 0 |
| The Alternative | 10,144 | 1.1 | 0 |
| Total | 918,219 | 100.0 | 41 |
Source: KMD Valg

=== Combined 2021 regional seat totals and notional results if the region held an election in 2021 ===
| Parties | Vote | | Seats | | |
| Parties | Votes | % | Combined Seats | Notional Seats | + / – |
|---|---|---|---|---|---|
| Social Democrats | 361,354 | 26.8 | 24 | 14 | -10 |
| Conservatives | 240,937 | 17.9 | 15 | 9 | -6 |
| Venstre | 189,175 | 14.0 | 15 | 7 | -8 |
| Red–Green Alliance | 144,974 | 10.7 | 8 | 5 | -3 |
| Green Left | 115,484 | 8.6 | 7 | 4 | -3 |
| Social Liberals | 109,338 | 8.1 | 7 | 4 | -3 |
| Danish People's Party | 57,467 | 4.3 | 3 | 2 | -1 |
| New Right | 51,548 | 3.8 | 3 | 2 | -1 |
| Total | 1,349,385 | 100.0 | 82 | 47 | -35 |

== Electoral system ==
For elections to Danish regional councils, a number varying from 25 to 47 are chosen to be elected to the Regional council. The seats are then allocated using the D'Hondt method and a closed list proportional representation. The Eastern Denmark Region had 47 seats in 2025.

== Electoral alliances ==
=== Electoral Alliance 1 ===
| Party | | Political alignment |
|---|---|---|
| A | Social Democrats | Centre-left |
| B | Social Liberals | Centre to Centre-left |
| F | Green Left | Centre-left to Left-wing |
| J | Demokraterne – hele Danmark skal leve | Local politics |
| M | Moderates | Centre to Centre-right |
| Ø | Red-Green Alliance | Left-wing to Far-Left |
| Å | The Alternative | Centre-left to Left-wing |

=== Electoral Alliance 2 ===
| Party | | Political alignment |
|---|---|---|
| C | Conservatives | Centre-right |
| I | Liberal Alliance | Centre-right to Right-wing |
| K | Christian Democrats | Centre to Centre-right |
| O | Danish People's Party | Right-wing to Far-right |
| V | Venstre | Centre-right |
| Æ | Denmark Democrats | Right-wing to Far-right |

== Results by constituency and municipality ==
=== Results by constituency ===
| Division | A | B | C | F | I | J | K | L | M | N | O | P | R | V | Æ | Ø | Å | Others |
| Division | % | % | % | % | % | % | % | % | % | % | % | % | % | % | % | % | % | % |
|---|---|---|---|---|---|---|---|---|---|---|---|---|---|---|---|---|---|---|
| Zealand | 24.3 | 4.4 | 9.8 | 9.5 | 5.6 | 0.2 | 0.2 | 0.1 | 2.2 | 0.3 | 15.0 | 0.1 | 0.1 | 16.1 | 5.5 | 5.4 | 0.8 | 0.4 |
| North Zealand | 17.9 | 8.6 | 19.1 | 10.8 | 7.4 | 0.1 | 0.3 | 0.1 | 2.6 | 0.2 | 11.0 | 0.1 | 0.1 | 11.8 | 2.4 | 5.9 | 1.3 | 0.2 |
| Greater Copenhagen | 22.4 | 10.7 | 16.6 | 11.5 | 5.8 | 0.1 | 0.3 | 0.3 | 2.1 | 0.2 | 11.4 | 0.1 | 0.1 | 6.7 | 1.6 | 8.6 | 1.2 | 0.2 |
| Copenhagen | 15.1 | 14.0 | 12.3 | 15.1 | 5.7 | 0.1 | 0.2 | 0.1 | 2.0 | 0.1 | 5.5 | 0.2 | 0.3 | 5.7 | 0.8 | 19.3 | 3.3 | 0.1 |
| Bornholm | 46.0 | 2.6 | 5.5 | 5.6 | 1.9 | 0.2 | 3.0 | 0.0 | 0.6 | 0.1 | 16.2 | 0.1 | 0.0 | 7.6 | 2.7 | 7.1 | 0.5 | 0.2 |

=== Results by municipality ===
| Division | A | B | C | F | I | J | K | L | M | N | O | P | R | V | Æ | Ø | Å | Others |
| Division | % | % | % | % | % | % | % | % | % | % | % | % | % | % | % | % | % | % |
|---|---|---|---|---|---|---|---|---|---|---|---|---|---|---|---|---|---|---|
| Lolland | 27.1 | 1.2 | 5.8 | 7.7 | 2.6 | 0.8 | 0.1 | 0.3 | 0.7 | 0.4 | 17.9 | 0.1 | 0.1 | 13.2 | 15.1 | 4.9 | 0.5 | 1.5 |
| Guldborgsund | 31.1 | 2.9 | 5.9 | 10.2 | 3.8 | 0.3 | 0.2 | 0.2 | 1.8 | 0.2 | 15.7 | 0.1 | 0.1 | 12.3 | 8.6 | 3.8 | 0.5 | 2.2 |
| Vordingborg | 21.3 | 4.5 | 6.2 | 9.9 | 5.5 | 0.2 | 0.1 | 0.1 | 9.9 | 0.2 | 15.2 | 0.1 | 0.1 | 13.1 | 5.1 | 7.2 | 0.9 | 0.4 |
| Næstved | 25.1 | 4.4 | 16.1 | 7.7 | 5.8 | 0.2 | 0.1 | 0.1 | 1.8 | 0.2 | 17.0 | 0.0 | 0.1 | 11.8 | 3.7 | 4.9 | 0.9 | 0.3 |
| Faxe | 21.0 | 2.2 | 6.5 | 8.3 | 6.4 | 0.2 | 0.2 | 0.2 | 1.3 | 0.3 | 20.5 | 0.1 | 0.1 | 20.8 | 6.3 | 4.5 | 0.8 | 0.4 |
| Stevns | 22.3 | 5.1 | 9.0 | 12.2 | 4.5 | 0.2 | 0.2 | 0.1 | 2.6 | 0.3 | 18.1 | 0.0 | 0.1 | 14.3 | 6.2 | 3.7 | 0.9 | 0.2 |
| Køge | 18.8 | 3.9 | 13.4 | 11.5 | 5.6 | 0.2 | 0.5 | 0.2 | 1.9 | 0.4 | 15.1 | 0.1 | 0.1 | 19.2 | 3.9 | 4.2 | 0.9 | 0.2 |
| Lejre | 15.4 | 5.3 | 6.7 | 19.8 | 5.7 | 0.2 | 0.3 | 0.2 | 1.5 | 0.3 | 11.1 | 0.0 | 0.1 | 20.6 | 4.6 | 7.1 | 1.0 | 0.2 |
| Greve | 21.0 | 4.8 | 8.2 | 6.4 | 8.0 | 0.1 | 0.3 | 0.2 | 2.0 | 1.3 | 16.8 | 0.0 | 0.1 | 21.6 | 2.4 | 5.8 | 0.7 | 0.2 |
| Solrød | 17.4 | 5.3 | 10.6 | 7.0 | 17.0 | 0.1 | 0.2 | 0.2 | 1.6 | 0.7 | 13.4 | 0.0 | 0.1 | 16.3 | 6.0 | 3.3 | 0.6 | 0.2 |
| Roskilde | 20.5 | 6.9 | 14.8 | 13.8 | 6.4 | 0.1 | 0.1 | 0.1 | 3.7 | 0.2 | 10.6 | 0.0 | 0.1 | 12.0 | 1.9 | 7.4 | 1.0 | 0.2 |
| Holbæk | 33.9 | 5.5 | 4.9 | 6.6 | 5.2 | 0.2 | 0.2 | 0.1 | 1.1 | 0.3 | 11.0 | 0.1 | 0.1 | 19.0 | 5.3 | 5.8 | 0.7 | 0.1 |
| Kalundborg | 24.3 | 3.3 | 4.5 | 8.6 | 4.8 | 0.2 | 0.2 | 0.2 | 1.4 | 0.3 | 19.5 | 0.0 | 0.1 | 18.4 | 8.4 | 4.9 | 0.6 | 0.3 |
| Odsherred | 38.9 | 4.7 | 4.0 | 7.3 | 3.5 | 0.2 | 0.1 | 0.1 | 0.9 | 0.4 | 14.8 | 0.0 | 0.1 | 11.2 | 7.1 | 5.1 | 1.0 | 0.4 |
| Ringsted | 20.1 | 3.0 | 28.4 | 7.9 | 3.3 | 0.2 | 0.6 | 0.1 | 0.7 | 0.3 | 10.7 | 0.0 | 0.1 | 13.7 | 4.4 | 5.5 | 0.8 | 0.2 |
| Sorø | 22.6 | 6.1 | 9.0 | 8.6 | 4.6 | 0.2 | 0.2 | 0.0 | 1.4 | 0.3 | 13.2 | 0.1 | 0.1 | 19.7 | 5.2 | 7.3 | 1.0 | 0.3 |
| Slagelse | 25.0 | 3.3 | 6.6 | 7.8 | 5.5 | 0.3 | 0.2 | 0.1 | 1.2 | 0.2 | 17.0 | 0.1 | 0.1 | 20.0 | 6.7 | 5.1 | 0.6 | 0.2 |
| Helsingør | 19.8 | 7.3 | 21.3 | 12.7 | 6.1 | 0.2 | 0.3 | 0.1 | 3.6 | 0.3 | 10.9 | 0.1 | 0.1 | 5.3 | 2.6 | 7.7 | 1.5 | 0.2 |
| Fredensborg | 19.8 | 10.9 | 18.3 | 10.4 | 6.7 | 0.1 | 0.4 | 0.1 | 3.0 | 0.2 | 11.5 | 0.1 | 0.2 | 9.8 | 1.4 | 5.2 | 1.8 | 0.2 |
| Hørsholm | 10.3 | 9.3 | 30.9 | 4.9 | 13.7 | 0.1 | 0.2 | 0.1 | 2.7 | 0.2 | 8.6 | 0.1 | 0.0 | 14.5 | 1.2 | 2.3 | 0.7 | 0.1 |
| Hillerød | 19.6 | 8.1 | 19.1 | 13.1 | 6.3 | 0.1 | 0.4 | 0.1 | 3.4 | 0.2 | 9.9 | 0.1 | 0.1 | 9.9 | 2.3 | 6.2 | 1.1 | 0.2 |
| Gribskov | 15.4 | 5.3 | 19.3 | 10.2 | 6.1 | 0.2 | 0.5 | 0.1 | 4.1 | 0.6 | 16.9 | 0.1 | 0.1 | 8.9 | 4.6 | 5.8 | 1.4 | 0.6 |
| Halsnæs | 27.4 | 3.2 | 7.6 | 15.6 | 4.6 | 0.2 | 0.2 | 0.0 | 1.5 | 0.1 | 15.0 | 0.2 | 0.1 | 9.5 | 5.3 | 6.1 | 3.2 | 0.2 |
| Frederikssund | 19.3 | 4.8 | 9.7 | 10.6 | 9.0 | 0.2 | 0.2 | 0.1 | 1.3 | 0.2 | 16.4 | 0.1 | 0.1 | 17.6 | 3.7 | 5.5 | 1.0 | 0.3 |
| Egedal | 22.1 | 8.1 | 11.9 | 10.3 | 8.6 | 0.2 | 0.2 | 0.3 | 2.2 | 0.2 | 12.2 | 0.1 | 0.1 | 14.0 | 3.1 | 5.4 | 0.8 | 0.3 |
| Furesø | 18.8 | 14.7 | 20.3 | 10.5 | 6.2 | 0.1 | 0.2 | 0.1 | 1.9 | 0.1 | 6.6 | 0.1 | 0.1 | 10.8 | 0.9 | 7.3 | 1.2 | 0.2 |
| Allerød | 14.2 | 9.5 | 21.5 | 12.4 | 6.1 | 0.1 | 0.2 | 0.1 | 2.0 | 0.1 | 8.0 | 0.0 | 0.0 | 17.7 | 1.1 | 5.9 | 0.8 | 0.2 |
| Rudersdal | 10.0 | 12.6 | 28.6 | 7.4 | 9.3 | 0.0 | 0.2 | 0.1 | 2.4 | 0.2 | 6.3 | 0.1 | 0.0 | 15.7 | 0.7 | 5.4 | 1.0 | 0.1 |
| Gentofte | 9.5 | 12.0 | 34.1 | 7.4 | 8.5 | 0.1 | 0.2 | 0.0 | 2.5 | 0.1 | 7.7 | 0.1 | 0.1 | 10.3 | 0.7 | 5.6 | 0.9 | 0.2 |
| Lyngby-Taarbæk | 13.6 | 15.4 | 26.6 | 11.4 | 7.0 | 0.1 | 0.2 | 0.1 | 2.2 | 0.2 | 6.5 | 0.1 | 0.1 | 8.4 | 0.7 | 6.2 | 1.2 | 0.2 |
| Gladsaxe | 22.2 | 13.5 | 8.8 | 14.3 | 5.4 | 0.1 | 0.3 | 0.2 | 2.5 | 0.2 | 9.7 | 0.1 | 0.2 | 8.3 | 1.9 | 10.9 | 1.3 | 0.1 |
| Herlev | 29.1 | 6.5 | 12.4 | 12.9 | 5.6 | 0.1 | 0.4 | 0.2 | 2.2 | 0.2 | 10.5 | 0.1 | 0.1 | 6.2 | 1.7 | 10.6 | 0.9 | 0.2 |
| Rødovre | 28.3 | 7.9 | 11.2 | 13.7 | 4.7 | 0.1 | 0.5 | 0.1 | 2.2 | 0.2 | 12.9 | 0.1 | 0.2 | 4.0 | 2.1 | 10.4 | 1.3 | 0.2 |
| Hvidovre | 25.0 | 9.5 | 10.2 | 17.4 | 5.2 | 0.1 | 0.2 | 0.2 | 1.9 | 0.2 | 13.6 | 0.1 | 0.1 | 4.5 | 2.1 | 8.4 | 1.0 | 0.2 |
| Brøndby | 28.3 | 10.2 | 8.3 | 10.3 | 4.2 | 0.2 | 0.3 | 0.2 | 2.1 | 0.2 | 17.0 | 0.1 | 0.1 | 4.2 | 2.0 | 10.6 | 1.6 | 0.2 |
| Vallensbæk | 20.4 | 7.9 | 25.6 | 8.4 | 7.3 | 0.1 | 0.2 | 0.1 | 1.8 | 0.2 | 12.5 | 0.1 | 0.1 | 5.0 | 1.8 | 7.4 | 1.0 | 0.2 |
| Ishøj | 29.4 | 9.8 | 6.6 | 8.5 | 4.6 | 0.3 | 0.2 | 0.4 | 2.2 | 1.3 | 15.4 | 0.1 | 0.1 | 6.3 | 2.3 | 10.4 | 2.1 | 0.3 |
| Høje-Taastrup | 21.8 | 10.6 | 21.7 | 8.9 | 4.3 | 0.2 | 0.2 | 0.1 | 1.9 | 0.2 | 14.1 | 0.1 | 0.1 | 4.6 | 1.9 | 8.0 | 1.1 | 0.2 |
| Albertslund | 25.3 | 11.3 | 7.4 | 16.1 | 3.8 | 0.2 | 0.2 | 0.6 | 1.2 | 0.2 | 11.9 | 0.2 | 0.2 | 3.3 | 1.5 | 14.4 | 2.1 | 0.2 |
| Glostrup | 28.9 | 7.9 | 8.5 | 9.3 | 5.3 | 0.1 | 0.2 | 2.7 | 1.6 | 0.1 | 13.9 | 0.1 | 0.1 | 9.9 | 3.0 | 7.4 | 1.0 | 0.2 |
| Ballerup | 33.9 | 7.9 | 8.9 | 10.6 | 6.1 | 0.1 | 0.3 | 0.1 | 2.4 | 0.2 | 13.7 | 0.1 | 0.1 | 5.6 | 1.6 | 7.2 | 1.1 | 0.1 |
| Copenhagen | 15.1 | 14.0 | 12.3 | 15.1 | 5.7 | 0.1 | 0.2 | 0.1 | 2.0 | 0.1 | 5.5 | 0.2 | 0.3 | 5.7 | 0.8 | 19.3 | 3.3 | 0.1 |
| Frederiksberg | 17.4 | 13.5 | 22.3 | 11.2 | 5.4 | 0.1 | 0.2 | 0.0 | 2.1 | 0.1 | 4.1 | 0.1 | 0.2 | 5.6 | 0.5 | 14.8 | 2.3 | 0.1 |
| Tårnby | 28.5 | 6.6 | 8.9 | 11.9 | 5.9 | 0.1 | 0.2 | 0.1 | 2.4 | 0.2 | 16.9 | 0.1 | 0.1 | 5.9 | 3.1 | 7.9 | 1.0 | 0.3 |
| Dragør | 16.3 | 6.2 | 34.0 | 8.4 | 6.9 | 0.1 | 0.1 | 0.0 | 3.0 | 0.1 | 9.7 | 0.1 | 0.1 | 8.3 | 1.9 | 3.7 | 0.8 | 0.3 |
| Bornholm | 46.0 | 2.6 | 5.5 | 5.6 | 1.9 | 0.2 | 3.0 | 0.0 | 0.6 | 0.1 | 16.2 | 0.1 | 0.0 | 7.6 | 2.7 | 7.1 | 0.5 | 0.2 |

== Results ==
| Party | | Votes | % | +/- | Seats | +/- |
Eastern Denmark Region
| A | Social Democrats | 295,178 | 20.36 | -6.42 | 10 | New |
| C | Conservatives | 195,169 | 13.46 | -4.39 | 7 | New |
| F | Green Left | 170,100 | 11.73 | +3.17 | 6 | New |
| O | Danish People's Party | 156,055 | 10.76 | +6.51 | 5 | New |
| Ø | Red-Green Alliance | 149,143 | 10.29 | -0.46 | 5 | New |
| V | Venstre | 149,014 | 10.28 | -3.74 | 5 | New |
| B | Social Liberals | 133,747 | 9.23 | +1.12 | 4 | New |
| I | Liberal Alliance | 86,130 | 5.94 | +4.05 | 3 | New |
| Æ | Denmark Democrats | 39,919 | 2.75 | New | 1 | New |
| M | Moderates | 31,745 | 2.19 | New | 1 | New |
| Å | The Alternative | 24,742 | 1.71 | +0.82 | 0 | New |
| K | Christian Democrats | 3,937 | 0.27 | -0.28 | 0 | New |
| N | Nyt Sjælland | 3,420 | 0.24 | New | 0 | New |
| J | Demokraterne – hele Danmark skal leve | 2,170 | 0.15 | New | 0 | New |
| R | Kommunistisk Parti | 2,141 | 0.15 | +0.09 | 0 | New |
| L | Bylisten | 2,021 | 0.14 | New | 0 | New |
| P | DKP – Kommunisterne | 1,401 | 0.10 | New | 0 | New |
| Total | | 1,446,032 | 100 | N/A | 47 | N/A |
| Invalid votes | | 5,328 | 0.24 | -0.06 | | |
| Blank votes | | 53,120 | 2.39 | +0.13 | | |
| Turnout | | 1,504,480 | 67.78 | +4.67 | | |
Source: valg.dk

== Opinion polls ==
| Polling firm | Fieldwork date | Sample size | A | C | V | F | B | Ø | O | I | Å | K | R | M | Æ | Others | Lead |
|---|---|---|---|---|---|---|---|---|---|---|---|---|---|---|---|---|---|
| Epinion | 4 Sep – 13 October 2025 | 1072 | 20.0 | 12.5 | 8.6 | 16.7 | 4.8 | 12.0 | 7.0 | 9.0 | 1.9 | – | – | 1.2 | 5.2 | 1.0 | 3.3 |
| 2024 european parliament election | 9 June 2024 | | 14.4 | 9.2 | 11.9 | 20.0 | 8.5 | 9.4 | 6.2 | 6.8 | 3.1 | – | – | 6.5 | 4.1 | – | 5.6 |
| 2022 general election | 1 November 2022 | | 25.5 | 5.8 | 11.4 | 9.8 | 4.8 | 6.9 | 3.1 | 7.9 | 4.5 | 0.3 | – | 10.5 | 4.8 | – | 14.1 |
| 2021 municipal elections | 16 November 2021 | | 26.3 | 18.5 | 14.2 | 8.1 | 6.8 | 10.7 | 4.1 | 1.8 | 0.9 | 0.3 | – | – | – | – | 7.8 |
| 2021 regional elections | 16 November 2021 | | 26.8 | 17.9 | 14.0 | 8.6 | 8.1 | 10.7 | 4.2 | 1.9 | 0.7 | 0.6 | 0.1 | – | – | – | 8.9 |
