= KPiD =

KPID may refer to:

- Kommunistisk Parti i Danmark (KPiD), known in English as Communist Party in Denmark
- Komisyon para sa mga Pilipino sa Ibayong Dagat (KPID), known in English as Commission on Filipinos Overseas (CFO)
