= 2021 Brøndby municipal election =

← 2017	16 November 2021	2025 →

All 19 seats to the Brøndby Municipal Council 10 seats needed for a majority
- Turnout: 15,430 (55.5%) ▼6.8pp
	First party	Second party	Third party
	A	C	Ø
Party	Social Democrats	Conservatives	Red–Green Alliance
Last election	11 seat, 52.9%	0 seats, 2.2%	1 seat, 5.8%
Seats won	11	2	1
Seat change	0	▲2	0
Popular vote	8,104	1,146	1,185
Percentage	53.5%	7.6%	7.8%
Swing	▲0.6%	▲5.4%	▲2%
	Fourth party	Fifth party	Sixth party
	V	F	O
Party	Venstre	Green Left	Danish People's Party
Last election	2 seats, 10.0%	1 seat, 5.2%	3 seats, 14.1%
Seats won	1	1	1
Seat change	▼1	0	▼2
Popular vote	992	941	914
Percentage	6.6%	6.2%	6.0%
Swing	▼3.4%	▲1.0%	▼8.1%
	Seventh party	Eighth party
	B	D
Party	Social Liberals	New Right
Last election	1 seat, 3.2%	0 seats, 0.7%
Seats won	1	1
Seat change	0	▲1
Popular vote	800	715
Percentage	5.3%	4.7%
Swing	▲2.1%	▲4%
Mayor before election
Kent Max Magelund
Social Democrats
Mayor after election
Kent Max Magelund
Social Democrats

Brøndby Municipality has in its history been a strong area for parties of the red bloc. In the 2019 Danish general election, it was the municipality where the bloc received the 3rd highest percentage of votes. Since 1966, the Social Democrats had held the mayor's position, and had won an absolute majority in all but one election from 1981 to 2017.

In the 2017 election, the Social Democrats had won 11 seats, and the absolute majority made Kent Max Magelund mayor.

In this election, once again the Social Democrats would become the largest party and win an absolute majority. Therefore Kent Max Magelund was set to be mayor for his 2nd full term (Note: He took over in 2016 from Ib Terp)

== Electoral system ==
For elections to Danish municipalities, a number varying from 9 to 31 are chosen to be elected to the municipal council. The seats are then allocated using the D'Hondt method and a closed list proportional representation. Brøndby Municipality had 19 seats in 2021

Unlike in Danish General Elections, in elections to municipal councils, electoral alliances are allowed.

== Electoral alliances ==
=== Electoral Alliance 1 ===
Party		Political alignment
C	Conservatives	Centre-right
D	New Right	Right-wing to Far-right
I	Liberal Alliance	Centre-right to Right-wing
O	Danish People's Party	Right-wing to Far-right
V	Venstre	Centre-right

=== Electoral Alliance 2 ===
Party		Political alignment
B	Social Liberals	Centre to Centre-left
F	Green Left	Centre-left to Left-wing
Ø	Red–Green Alliance	Left-wing to Far-Left

== Results by polling station ==
Division	A	B	C	D	F	I	O	V	Æ	Ø
Division	%	%	%	%	%	%	%	%	%	%
Brøndbyvester Skole	46.1	3.9	11.1	6.1	7.2	1.7	7.4	9.4	0.4	6.7
Tjørnehøjhallen	53.8	2.0	6.9	5.7	7.6	1.3	7.2	9.2	0.6	5.8
Lindelundshallen	58.1	2.2	7.3	5.0	7.2	1.0	5.8	6.6	0.8	6.2
Nørregård	58.5	4.6	7.1	4.5	5.6	0.9	5.6	4.3	0.7	8.4
Kulturhuset Brønden	51.7	8.7	6.7	3.8	5.3	2.8	5.4	5.7	0.5	9.3

== Results ==
Party		Votes	%	+/-	Seats	+/-
Brøndby Municipality
A	Social Democrats	8,104	53.50	+0.59	11	0
Ø	Red-Green Alliance	1,185	7.82	+2.03	1	0
C	Conservatives	1,146	7.56	+5.34	2	+2
V	Venstre	992	6.55	-3.43	1	-1
F	Green Left	941	6.21	+0.96	1	0
O	Danish People's Party	914	6.03	-8.09	1	-2
B	Social Liberals	800	5.28	+2.11	1	0
D	New Right	715	4.72	+3.98	1	+1
I	Liberal Alliance	269	1.78	+0.36	0	0
Æ	Freedom List	83	0.55	New	0	New
Total		15,149	100	N/A	19	N/A
Invalid votes		98	0.35	-0.01		
Blank votes		183	0.66	-0.11		
Turnout		15,430	55.52	-6.52		
Source: valg.dk
