= Socialist List of Tårnby =

Socialist List of Tårnby (in Danish: Tårnby Socialistiske Liste) is a political alliance in Tårnby, Denmark. In 2005 it contested the municipal elections for the fourth time. It got 199 votes (1%), far below the 600 votes (2.1%) it had got in 2001. In 2001 the list included members of Red-Green Alliance, Communist Party in Denmark, Communist Party of Denmark and Workers Party Common Course, as well as independents. By 2005 The Red-Green Alliance launched a list of their own, and the Communist Party in Denmark was the sole organized force remaining in the Socialist List.

The list did not win any seat in 2005.
