= 2021 Struer municipal election =

Local elections in Denmark

← 2017	16 November 2021	2025 →

All 21 seats to the Struer Municipal Council 11 seats needed for a majority
- Turnout: 12,185 (72.3%) ▼5.1pp
	First party	Second party	Third party
	V	A	C
Party	Venstre	Social Democrats	Conservatives
Last election	8 seats, 36.5%	8 seats, 33.2%	1 seat, 6.4%
Seats won	9	7	2
Seat change	▲1	▼1	▲1
Popular vote	4,852	3,788	1,052
Percentage	40.4%	31.6%	8.8%
Swing	▲3.9%	▼1.6%	▲2.4%
	Fourth party	Fifth party	Sixth party
	F	B	D
Party	Green Left	Social Liberals	New Right
Last election	2 seats, 6.7%	1 seats, 3.4%	0 seats, 1.0%
Seats won	1	1	1
Seat change	▼1	0	▲1
Popular vote	663	592	442
Percentage	5.5%	4.9%	3.7%
Swing	▼1.2%	▲1.5%	▲2.7%
	Seventh party
	O
Party	Danish People's Party
Last election	1 seats, 4.9%
Seats won	0
Seat change	▼1
Popular vote	300
Percentage	2.5%
Swing	▼2.4%
Mayor before election
Niels Viggo Lynghøj
Social Democrats
Mayor after election
Mads Jakobsen
Venstre

Since the 2007 municipal reform, no mayor had been re-elected in Struer Municipality, with Venstre holding office for 2007-2009 and 2014–2017, while the Social Democrats had held office for 2010-2013 and 2018–2021. Mads Jakobsen, who was mayor from 2014 to 2017, ran to return as mayor after losing the position as a result of the 2017 election.

In the election, Venstre would gain a seat while he Social Democrats lost a seat. A blue bloc majority by winning 12 of the 21 seats was clear. On 8 December 2021 it was confirmed that Mads Jacbonsen would return as mayor.

== Electoral system ==
For elections to Danish municipalities, a number varying from 9 to 31 are chosen to be elected to the municipal council. The seats are then allocated using the D'Hondt method and a closed list proportional representation. Struer Municipality had 21 seats in 2021

Unlike in Danish General Elections, in elections to municipal councils, electoral alliances are allowed.

== Electoral alliances ==
=== Electoral Alliance 1 ===
Party		Political alignment
B	Social Liberals	Centre to Centre-left
F	Green Left	Centre-left to Left-wing

=== Electoral Alliance 2 ===
Party		Political alignment
D	New Right	Right-wing to Far-right
O	Danish People's Party	Right-wing to Far-right

=== Electoral Alliance 3 ===
Party		Political alignment
C	Conservatives	Centre-right
I	Liberal Alliance	Centre-right to Right-wing
V	Venstre	Centre-right

== Results by polling station ==
J = Fiskerlussing

Division	A	B	C	D	F	I	J	O	V	Æ
Division	%	%	%	%	%	%	%	%	%	%
Struer	35.9	5.9	5.6	3.8	6.9	2.0	0.9	2.8	35.6	0.5
Gimsing	37.0	3.5	5.3	3.8	6.3	2.5	0.5	2.7	37.8	0.6
Hjerm	27.8	1.5	5.0	4.0	3.5	1.1	0.7	1.9	54.5	0.0
Humlum	34.4	3.2	7.9	4.7	5.5	1.1	0.5	2.4	40.1	0.1
Bremdal	32.0	4.9	6.4	3.6	5.1	1.7	0.5	1.8	43.9	0.2
Langhøj	18.9	3.6	6.3	3.1	3.8	2.1	0.3	2.7	59.0	0.3
Hvidbjerg	26.4	7.5	25.2	2.9	4.3	0.5	0.3	2.4	30.2	0.3

== Results ==
Party		Votes	%	+/-	Seats	+/-
Struer Municipality
V	Venstre	4,852	40.43	+3.91	9	+1
A	Social Democrats	3,788	31.56	-1.69	7	-1
C	Conservatives	1,052	8.77	+2.38	2	+1
F	Green Left	663	5.52	-1.22	1	-1
B	Social Liberals	592	4.93	+1.53	1	0
D	New Right	442	3.68	+2.73	1	+1
O	Danish People's Party	300	2.50	-2.36	0	-1
I	Liberal Alliance	200	1.67	+0.02	0	0
J	Fiskerlussing	72	0.60	New	0	New
Æ	Freedom List	41	0.34	New	0	New
Total		12,002	100	N/A	21	N/A
Invalid votes		64	0.38	+0.18		
Blank votes		119	0.71	+0.08		
Turnout		12,185	72.29	-5.07		
Source: valg.dk
