= 2021 Hillerød municipal election =

- 16 November 2021

All 19 seats to the Hillerød Municipal Council 10 seats needed for a majority
- Turnout: 28,818 (69.5%) ▼4.7pp
	First party	Second party	Third party
	A	V	C
Party	Social Democrats	Venstre	Conservatives
Last election	9 seats, 28.7%	10 seats, 33.9%	1 seat, 5.6%
Seats won	7	6	5
Seat change	▼2	▼4	▲4
Popular vote	6,981	6,118	4,503
Percentage	24.6%	21.6%	15.9%
Swing	▼4.1%	▼12.3%	▲10.3%
	Fourth party	Fifth party	Sixth party
	F	B	Ø
Party	Green Left	Social Liberals	Red–Green Alliance
Last election	2 seats, 6.5%	2 seats, 5.7%	1 seat, 5.9%
Seats won	4	2	1
Seat change	▲2	0	0
Popular vote	3,789	1,768	1,865
Percentage	13.4%	6.2%	6.6%
Swing	▲6.9%	▲0.5%	▲0.7%
	Seventh party	Eighth party
	D	O
Party	New Right	Danish People's Party
Last election	1 seat, 3.6%	1 seat, 4.6%
Seats won	1	1
Seat change	0	0
Popular vote	1,345	1,237
Percentage	4.8%	4.4%
Swing	▲1.2%	▼0.2%
Mayor before election
Kirsten Jensen
Social Democrats
Mayor after election
Kirsten Jensen
Social Democrats

In the 2017 election, the Social Democrats had won the mayor's position, a gain from the Conservatives who had held it in the previous term.

In this election, the Social Democrats and Venstre would both suffer 2 and 4 seat losses respectively. Green Left and Conservatives would on the other hand, gain 2 and 4 seats respectively. The election result still saw a slim red bloc majority however, and this helped Kirsten Jensen secure a 2nd full term as mayor. (Note: she was also mayor from 2007 to 2009)

== Electoral system ==
For elections to Danish municipalities, a number varying from 9 to 31 are chosen to be elected to the municipal council. The seats are then allocated using the D'Hondt method and a closed list proportional representation. Hillerød Municipality had 19 seats in 2021

Unlike in Danish General Elections, in elections to municipal councils, electoral alliances are allowed.

== Electoral alliances ==
=== Electoral Alliance 1 ===
Party		Political alignment
A	Social Democrats	Centre-left
B	Social Liberals	Centre to Centre-left

=== Electoral Alliance 2 ===
Party		Political alignment
C	Conservatives	Centre-right
D	New Right	Right-wing to Far-right
I	Liberal Alliance	Centre-right to Right-wing

=== Electoral Alliance 3 ===
Party		Political alignment
F	Green Left	Centre-left to Left-wing
Ø	Red–Green Alliance	Left-wing to Far-Left

=== Electoral Alliance 4 ===
Party		Political alignment
O	Danish People's Party	Right-wing to Far-right
V	Venstre	Centre-right

== Results by polling station ==
Division	A	B	C	D	F	I	K	O	V	Æ	Ø
Division	%	%	%	%	%	%	%	%	%	%	%
Royal Stage	25.1	6.4	16.7	3.9	15.5	1.9	0.5	2.6	19.1	0.3	7.8
Hillerødsholmsskolen	26.5	7.2	15.5	4.3	15.1	1.3	0.8	3.3	19.7	0.3	6.0
Brødeskov	18.8	6.5	12.6	7.3	9.9	1.8	0.2	4.3	32.4	0.0	6.1
Hammersholt	26.8	7.1	10.5	3.1	20.7	1.4	0.5	2.3	16.3	0.1	11.1
Alsønderup	17.0	4.1	17.1	6.5	17.6	1.0	0.5	5.2	26.8	0.3	3.9
Ullerød	25.4	5.3	17.2	4.8	12.7	1.5	0.6	3.3	22.9	0.3	6.0
Nødebo	20.7	16.3	17.5	3.6	10.4	1.7	0.8	2.0	21.0	0.6	5.5
Gadevang	19.7	13.5	21.0	4.0	15.4	1.9	0.8	1.4	13.8	0.3	8.2
Skævinge, Harløse, Strø	21.0	3.6	16.9	7.3	8.0	1.4	0.4	5.6	31.7	0.1	4.0
Lille Lyngby	21.7	3.5	13.5	8.9	7.4	1.0	0.4	4.8	34.4	0.4	4.1
Grønnevang Skole, Østervang	27.9	5.6	15.0	4.3	13.5	0.9	0.9	4.7	18.3	0.6	8.4
Grønnevang Skole, Jespervej	24.9	6.2	18.2	4.0	15.2	1.7	0.7	3.0	18.3	0.5	7.1
Gørløse	22.2	2.8	11.9	3.8	5.5	2.7	0.2	31.6	13.3	0.4	5.7
Uvelse	34.4	2.5	7.7	6.1	6.2	3.4	0.3	4.1	30.6	0.3	4.4

== Results ==
Party		Votes	%	+/-	Seats	+/-
Hillerød Municipality
A	Social Democrats	6,981	24.65	-4.09	7	-2
V	Venstre	6,118	21.60	-12.30	6	-4
C	Conservatives	4,503	15.90	+10.34	5	+4
F	Green Left	3,789	13.38	+6.84	4	+2
Ø	Red-Green Alliance	1,865	6.59	+0.70	1	0
B	Social Liberals	1,768	6.24	+0.58	2	0
D	New Right	1,345	4.75	+1.17	1	0
O	Danish People's Party	1,237	4.37	-0.21	1	0
I	Liberal Alliance	443	1.56	-1.08	0	0
K	Christian Democrats	174	0.61	-0.06	0	0
Æ	Freedom List	98	0.35	New	0	New
Total		28,321	100	N/A	27	N/A
Invalid votes		90	0.22	+0.04		
Blank votes		407	0.98	+0.22		
Turnout		28,818	69.54	-4.69		
Source: valg.dk
