= Monberg =

Monberg is a surname.

== List of people with the surname ==
- Børge Monberg (1905–1990), Danish field hockey player
- Jesper B. Monberg (born 1977), Danish speedway rider
- Michael Monberg (born 1978), Danish politician
- Terese Guinsatao Monberg, Filipino American academic
- Thomas Monberg (born 1976), Danish politician

== See also ==
- Monbeg
