= 2025 Ballerup municipal election =

← 2021	18 November 2025	2029 →

All 25 seats to the Ballerup municipal council 13 seats needed for a majority
- Turnout: 26,726 (65.0%) ▼0.8%
	First party	Second party	Third party
	A	F	O
Party	Social Democrats	Green Left	Danish People's Party
Last election	13 seats, 50.8%	2 seats, 7.1%	1 seat, 4.6%
Seats won	10	3	3
Seat change	▼3	▲1	▲2
Popular vote	10,517	3,123	2,750
Percentage	40.1%	11.9%	10.5%
Swing	▼10.6%	▲4.9%	▲5.9%
	Fourth party	Fifth party	Sixth party
	C	B	Ø
Party	Conservatives	Social Liberals	Red-Green Alliance
Last election	3 seats, 12.5%	1 seat, 4.2%	2 seats, 6.4%
Seats won	2	2	2
Seat change	▼1	▲1	0
Popular vote	1,864	1,863	1,789
Percentage	7.1%	7.1%	6.8%
Swing	▼5.3%	▲3.0%	▲0.4%
	Seventh party	Eighth party	Ninth party
	I	V	D
Party	Liberal Alliance	Venstre	New Right
Last election	0 seats, 0.8%	2 seats, 7.6%	1 seat, 3.2%
Seats won	2	1	0
Seat change	▲2	▼1	▼1
Popular vote	1,590	1,527	216
Percentage	6.1%	5.8%	0.8%
Swing	▲5.3%	▼1.8%	▼2.4%
Mayor before election
Jesper Würtzen
Social Democrats
Mayor after election
Jesper Würtzen
Social Democrats

The 2025 Ballerup Municipal election was held on November 18, 2025, to elect the 25 members to sit in the regional council for the Ballerup Municipal council, in the period of 2026 to 2029. Jesper Würtzen from the Social Democrats, would secure re-election.

== Background ==
Following the 2021 election, Jesper Würtzen from Social Democrats became mayor for his third term. He would run for a fourth term.

== Electoral system ==
For elections to Danish municipalities, a number varying from 9 to 31 are chosen to be elected to the municipal council. The seats are then allocated using the D'Hondt method and a closed list proportional representation. Ballerup Municipality had 25 seats in 2025.

== Electoral alliances ==
=== Electoral Alliance 1 ===
Party		Political alignment
B	Social Liberals	Centre to Centre-left
F	Green Left	Centre-left to Left-wing

=== Electoral Alliance 2 ===
Party		Political alignment
C	Conservatives	Centre-right
I	Liberal Alliance	Centre-right to Right-wing
V	Venstre	Centre-right

=== Electoral Alliance 3 ===
Party		Political alignment
D	New Right	Far-right
O	Danish People's Party	Right-wing to Far-right

=== Electoral Alliance 4 ===
Party		Political alignment
M	Moderates	Centre to Centre-right
Ø	Red-Green Alliance	Left-wing to Far-Left

== Results by polling station ==
Division	A	B	C	D	E	F	I	M	O	V	Ø
Division	%	%	%	%	%	%	%	%	%	%	%
Tapeten	44.8	4.2	4.4	1.1	1.3	9.9	5.5	3.4	13.8	5.5	6.1
Balleruphallen - Rugvænget	40.4	5.6	4.5	1.0	1.4	11.7	5.1	4.0	13.1	4.8	8.4
Højagerhallen - Skovvejens Skole Vest	41.3	5.9	11.7	0.7	0.5	11.7	5.8	1.7	9.4	7.5	3.9
Grantoftehallen	39.5	4.7	4.1	2.8	1.4	10.9	5.7	6.4	15.2	3.8	5.4
Idrætshallen (tidl. UCC-hallen) - Rosenlund	39.7	9.3	8.5	0.4	0.4	12.2	7.5	1.6	8.2	7.5	4.9
Skovlunde Skole - Lundebjerg	41.4	7.1	6.1	0.8	1.1	11.6	6.0	2.6	11.7	4.3	7.5
Måløv Ny Hal - Måløvhøj Skole - Måløv	40.0	7.1	10.7	0.2	0.5	11.3	6.7	1.7	7.6	6.3	7.8
Egebjerghallen - Skovvejens Skole Øst	37.3	10.5	8.4	0.4	0.6	15.0	6.2	1.7	6.1	7.4	6.4
Østerhøjhallen - Måløvhøj Skole - Østerhøj	34.0	10.8	7.9	0.4	0.5	13.6	6.4	1.9	7.5	7.0	10.0

== Results ==
Party		Votes	%	+/-	Seats	+/-
Ballerup Municipality
A	Social Democrats	10,517	40.13	-10.65	10	-3
F	Green Left	3,123	11.92	+4.85	3	+1
O	Danish People's Party	2,750	10.49	+5.93	3	+2
C	Conservatives	1,864	7.11	-5.34	2	-1
B	Social Liberals	1,863	7.11	+2.96	2	+1
Ø	Red-Green Alliance	1,789	6.83	+0.38	2	0
I	Liberal Alliance	1,590	6.07	+5.29	2	+2
V	Venstre	1,527	5.83	-1.79	1	-1
M	Moderates	734	2.80	New	0	New
E	Befri Ballerup	233	0.89	New	0	New
D	New Right	216	0.82	-2.39	0	-1
Total		26,206	100	N/A	25	N/A
Invalid votes		123	0.30	0.0		
Blank votes		397	0.97	+0.30		
Turnout		26,726	65.05	-0.83		
Source: valg.dk

== Opinion polls ==
Polling firm	Fieldwork date	Sample size	A	C	V	F	Ø	O	B	D	I	E	M	Others	Lead
Epinion	4 Sep - 13 Oct 2025	495	44.8	5.5	7.7	12.2	7.1	10.9	4.9	–	4.2	–	1.5	1.2	32.6
2024 european parliament election	9 Jun 2024		20.6	8.9	10.2	19.7	7.2	7.7	7.0	–	5.9	–	6.5	–	0.9
2022 general election	1 Nov 2022		35.4	4.6	9.0	9.7	4.7	4.2	3.9	3.2	6.3	–	9.5	–	25.7
2021 regional election	16 Nov 2021		44.3	14.1	8.5	7.1	6.6	4.7	5.8	3.8	1.2	–	–	–	30.2
2021 municipal election	16 Nov 2021		50.8 (13)	12.5 (3)	7.6 (2)	7.1 (2)	6.4 (2)	4.6 (1)	4.2 (1)	3.2 (0)	0.8 (0)	–	–	–	38.3
