= 2025 Struer municipal election =

Municipal election in Denmark

- 18 November 2025

All 21 seats to the Struer municipal council 11 seats needed for a majority
- Turnout: 12,103 (73.6%) ▲1.3%
	First party	Second party	Third party
	V	A	C
Party	Venstre	Social Democrats	Conservatives
Last election	9 seats, 40.4%	7 seats, 31.6%	2 seats, 8.8%
Seats won	8	7	2
Seat change	▼1	0	0
Popular vote	4,296	3,288	927
Percentage	36.1%	27.6%	7.8%
Swing	▼4.3%	▼3.9%	▼1.0%
	Fourth party	Fifth party	Sixth party
	F	Æ	I
Party	Green Left	Denmark Democrats	Liberal Alliance
Last election	1 seat, 5.5%	Did not stand	0 seats, 1.7%
Seats won	1	1	1
Seat change	0	▲1	▲1
Popular vote	830	823	750
Percentage	7.0%	6.9%	6.3%
Swing	▲1.4%	New	▲4.6%
	Seventh party	Eighth party
	B	D
Party	Social Liberals	New Right
Last election	1 seat, 4.9%	1 seat, 3.7%
Seats won	1	0
Seat change	0	▼1
Popular vote	531	27
Percentage	4.5%	0.2%
Swing	▼0.5%	▼3.5%
Mayor before election
Marianne Bredal
Venstre
Mayor after election
Marianne Bredal
Venstre

The 2025 Struer Municipal election was held on November 18, 2025, to elect the 21 members to sit in the regional council for the Struer Municipal council, in the period of 2026 to 2029. Following the election it was revealed that Marianne Bredal could continue as mayor.

== Background ==
Following the 2021 election, Mads Jakobsen from Venstre became mayor of Struer Municipality. However, Jakobsen, stepped out of politics in November 2023, due to stress. Following this, Marianne Bredal, from Venstre as well, took over the position as mayor. She was the leading candidate for the party in this election.

== Electoral system ==
For elections to Danish municipalities, a number varying from 9 to 31 are chosen to be elected to the municipal council. The seats are then allocated using the D'Hondt method and a closed list proportional representation. Struer Municipality had 21 seats in 2025.

Unlike in Danish General Elections, in elections to municipal councils, electoral alliances are allowed.

== Electoral alliances ==
=== Electoral Alliance 1 ===
Party		Political alignment
A	Social Democrats	Centre-left
B	Social Liberals	Centre to Centre-left
F	Green Left	Centre-left to Left-wing

=== Electoral Alliance 2 ===
Party		Political alignment
C	Conservatives	Centre-right
I	Liberal Alliance	Centre-right to Right-wing

=== Electoral Alliance 3 ===
Party		Political alignment
D	New Right	Far-right
O	Danish People's Party	Right-wing to Far-right
U	Adrian-Silviu Suiugan	Local politics

=== Electoral Alliance 4 ===
Party		Political alignment
V	Venstre	Centre-right
Æ	Denmark Democrats	Right-wing to Far-right

== Results by polling station ==
Division	A	B	C	D	F	I	J	K	O	U	V	Æ
Division	%	%	%	%	%	%	%	%	%	%	%	%
Struer Energi Park	31.7	3.8	5.5	0.3	8.2	6.8	0.2	0.2	3.6	0.1	34.4	5.2
Gimsing	30.2	3.4	4.6	0.2	7.6	8.5	0.2	0.2	4.1	0.4	34.3	6.3
Hjerm	25.9	4.4	2.9	0.3	4.4	4.5	0.0	0.2	2.6	0.0	48.2	6.7
Humlum	36.4	2.1	3.7	0.2	6.3	7.3	0.0	0.3	3.1	0.1	31.2	9.2
Bremdal	30.4	4.1	4.2	0.1	7.7	5.7	0.0	0.2	2.9	0.1	40.0	4.5
Langhøj	14.4	2.8	5.1	0.3	4.7	6.2	0.2	0.2	2.5	0.2	51.8	11.5
Hvidbjerg	18.4	9.9	26.3	0.2	6.5	4.5	0.0	0.2	2.3	0.4	22.5	8.8

== Results ==
Party		Votes	%	+/-	Seats	+/-
Struer Municipality
V	Venstre	4,296	36.08	-4.34	8	-1
A	Social Democrats	3,288	27.62	-3.95	7	0
C	Conservatives	927	7.79	-0.98	2	0
F	Green Left	830	6.97	+1.45	1	0
Æ	Denmark Democrats	823	6.91	New	1	New
I	Liberal Alliance	750	6.30	+4.63	1	+1
B	Social Liberals	531	4.46	-0.47	1	0
O	Danish People's Party	374	3.14	+0.64	0	0
D	New Right	27	0.23	-3.46	0	-1
K	DKP - Danmarks Kommunistiske Parti	25	0.21	New	0	New
U	Adrian-Silviu Suiugan	22	0.18	New	0	New
J	Verdensdemokraterne	13	0.11	New	0	New
Total		11,906	100	N/A	21	N/A
Invalid votes		36	0.22	-0.16		
Blank votes		161	0.98	+0.23		
Turnout		12,103	73.57	+1.28		
Source: valg.dk

== Opinion polls ==
Polling firm	Fieldwork date	Sample size	V	A	C	F	B	D	O	I	J	K	U	Æ	Others	Lead
Epinion	4 Sep - 13 Oct 2025	473	32.4	27.1	7.0	8.7	2.6	–	3.3	6.3	–	–	–	11.1	1.5	5.3
2024 european parliament election	9 Jun 2024		20.0	16.7	8.0	14.3	3.9	–	7.8	9.7	–	–	–	12.3	–	3.3
2022 general election	1 Nov 2022		20.3	30.4	5.6	6.5	1.5	2.8	2.3	7.0	–	–	–	14.1	–	10.1
2021 regional election	16 Nov 2021		36.7	33.3	6.2	5.2	3.5	3.9	3.0	1.9	–	–	–	–	–	3.4
2021 municipal election	16 Nov 2021		40.4 (9)	31.6 (7)	8.8 (2)	5.5 (1)	4.9 (1)	3.7 (1)	2.5 (0)	1.7 (0)	–	–	–	–	–	8.8
