= 2025 Central Denmark regional election =

- 18 November 2025

All 31 seats to the Central Denmark regional council 16 seats needed for a majority
- Turnout: 778,738 (73.3%) ▲4.2%
	First party	Second party	Third party
	A	V	F
Party	Social Democrats	Venstre	Green Left
Last election	13 seats, 29.3%	11 seats, 24.7%	3 seats, 7.2%
Seats won	8	6	4
Seat change	▼5	▼5	▲1
Popular vote	177,773	142,413	79,980
Percentage	23.9%	19.1%	10.7%
Swing	▼5.4%	▼5.5%	▲3.5%
	Fourth party	Fifth party	Sixth party
	C	Æ	I
Party	Conservatives	Denmark Democrats	Liberal Alliance
Last election	6 seats, 12.1%	Did not stand	0 seats, 1.7%
Seats won	3	2	2
Seat change	▼3	▲2	▲2
Popular vote	67,884	58,639	48,418
Percentage	9.1%	7.9%	6.5%
Swing	▼3.0%	New	▲4.8%
	Seventh party	Eighth party	Ninth party
	O	B	Ø
Party	Danish People's Party	Social Liberals	Red-Green Alliance
Last election	1 seat, 4.0%	2 seats, 5.0%	2 seats, 6.1%
Seats won	2	2	1
Seat change	▲1	0	▼1
Popular vote	43,289	35,599	38,323
Percentage	5.8%	4.8%	5.1%
Swing	▲1.9%	▼0.3%	▼1.0%
Chairperson before election
Andres Künhau
Social Democrats
Chairperson after election
Anders G. Christensen
Venstre

The 2025 Central Denmark Regional election was held on November 18, 2025, to elect the 31 members to sit in the regional council for the Central Denmark Region council, in the period of 2026 to 2029. Anders G. Christensen from Venstre, would take the chairperson.

Since their establishment in 2007, Denmark's five regions have been subject to ongoing political debate. In June 2024, the government's Health Structure Commission proposed three models for reorganizing the healthcare system, two of which involved abolishing the existing regions. In the end, the regions were retained, however with a reformartion of, among other things, the regional councils. Each of the five regional councils, had 41 seats, from their first election in 2005 to the 2021 election. The reform resulted in three regions, including the North Denmark Region, retaining their existing boundaries and continuing unchanged, while the two other regions were merged to form a new entity. As part of the reform, this region will elect only 31 council members.

== Notional results 2021 ==
=== 2021 Election Results and notional results with 31 Seats Contested ===
Parties	Vote		Seats		
Parties	Votes	%	Actual Seats	Notional Seats	+ / -
Social Democrats	205,961	29.3	13	11	-2
Venstre	173,353	24.7	11	8	-3
Conservatives	84,847	12.1	6	4	-2
Green Left	50,693	7.2	3	2	-1
Red–Green Alliance	42,904	6.1	2	2	0
Social Liberals	35,422	5.0	2	1	-1
Danish People's Party	27,785	4.0	1	1	0
New Right	25.778	3.8	1	1	0
Christian Democrats	25.778	2.7	1	1	0
Psychiatry List	13,196	1.9	1	0	-1
Total	702,387	100.0	41	31	-10

== Background ==
Following the 2021 election, Anders Künhau from Social Democrats became chairperson for his second term.

== Electoral system ==
For elections to Danish regional councils, a number varying from 25 to 47 are chosen to be elected to the Regional council. The seats are then allocated using the D'Hondt method and a closed list proportional representation. The Central Denmark Region had 31 seats in 2025.

== Electoral alliances ==
=== Electoral Alliance 1 ===
Party		Political alignment
A	Social Democrats	Centre-left
F	Green Left	Centre-left to Left-wing
Ø	Red-Green Alliance	Left-wing to Far-Left

=== Electoral Alliance 2 ===
Party		Political alignment
B	Social Liberals	Centre to Centre-left
C	Conservatives	Centre-right
I	Liberal Alliance	Centre-right to Right-wing
M	Moderates	Centre to Centre-right

=== Electoral Alliance 3 ===
Party		Political alignment
D	New Right	Far-right
O	Danish People's Party	Right-wing to Far-right
V	Venstre	Centre-right
Y	Velfærdsdemokraterne	Local politics
Æ	Denmark Democrats	Right-wing to Far-right

=== Electoral Alliance 4 ===
Party		Political alignment
K	Christian Democrats	Centre to Centre-right
P	Psychiatry List	Single-issue
Å	The Alternative	Centre-left to Left-wing

== Results by constituency and municipality ==
=== Results by constituency ===
Division	A	B	C	D	F	I	K	M	O	P	R	V	Y	Æ	Ø	Å
Division	%	%	%	%	%	%	%	%	%	%	%	%	%	%	%	%
West Jutland	20.3	3.5	9.3	0.4	7.9	6.5	3.1	0.7	6.3	1.2	0.2	25.8	0.4	11.0	2.7	0.8
East Jutland	26.1	5.6	9.0	0.3	12.5	6.5	0.9	1.5	5.5	2.5	0.2	14.9	0.2	5.9	6.7	1.7

=== Results by municipality ===
Division	A	B	C	D	F	I	K	M	O	P	R	V	Y	Æ	Ø	Å
Division	%	%	%	%	%	%	%	%	%	%	%	%	%	%	%	%
Lemvig	12.1	4.0	2.2	0.3	11.0	1.7	1.6	0.3	3.5	0.6	0.1	43.9	0.1	17.2	1.1	0.3
Struer	29.9	2.6	4.0	0.3	6.3	7.5	0.8	0.4	5.3	0.8	0.2	31.3	0.1	8.9	1.5	0.2
Skive	23.4	1.4	3.0	0.5	7.4	4.2	0.4	0.5	5.4	0.9	0.1	34.4	0.1	15.1	2.7	0.4
Viborg	23.1	2.1	16.6	0.3	7.2	6.7	0.6	0.9	6.5	1.3	0.1	16.8	1.7	10.7	3.2	2.3
Silkeborg	19.1	4.0	10.4	0.2	11.1	8.9	0.9	0.8	5.3	1.5	0.2	25.3	0.1	6.4	5.0	0.7
Ikast-Brande	19.8	1.7	19.6	0.4	4.6	6.1	1.4	0.6	11.3	1.2	0.2	19.8	0.1	11.3	1.5	0.4
Herning	17.9	4.6	8.4	0.5	8.1	6.2	3.4	0.6	5.5	1.1	0.2	31.0	0.2	10.3	1.6	0.4
Holstebro	24.2	8.4	4.6	0.5	8.1	6.0	1.4	0.6	10.1	1.0	0.1	24.7	0.1	7.8	1.9	0.3
Ringkøbing-Skjern	14.2	1.7	3.3	0.7	5.2	5.9	17.6	0.6	3.7	1.1	0.1	24.3	0.1	19.7	1.4	0.2
Aarhus	23.3	7.9	10.1	0.1	15.4	6.7	0.6	1.8	3.8	3.2	0.3	11.4	0.1	3.6	9.2	2.5
Syddjurs	27.2	3.9	8.6	0.3	10.9	4.8	0.4	0.8	5.0	2.2	0.3	17.4	0.1	9.5	6.4	2.3
Norddjurs	33.8	1.3	4.8	0.4	9.1	6.3	0.4	0.9	8.4	1.2	0.3	18.7	0.1	10.1	3.6	0.6
Randers	28.5	2.6	5.8	0.4	11.3	5.7	1.0	1.2	8.9	2.0	0.2	17.5	0.6	9.9	3.9	0.6
Favrskov	32.0	4.2	10.8	0.3	7.7	6.4	0.6	0.7	5.4	1.8	0.1	18.0	0.1	7.2	3.9	0.7
Skanderborg	27.8	6.3	11.0	0.2	12.3	7.5	0.5	1.5	4.5	2.3	0.2	14.8	0.1	5.4	4.4	1.1
Odder	28.2	4.2	11.1	0.4	11.9	5.0	0.4	1.1	5.0	2.0	0.2	17.0	0.2	3.9	8.4	1.1
Samsø	16.5	2.5	22.6	0.3	13.9	1.7	0.1	0.5	3.0	2.0	0.3	21.0	0.0	2.7	10.4	2.6
Horsens	31.1	3.7	8.0	0.5	9.4	7.4	0.6	1.3	8.1	1.7	0.2	16.2	0.1	6.0	5.0	0.7
Hedensted	20.4	1.8	5.2	0.4	6.7	6.9	5.8	1.8	8.7	1.0	0.1	26.8	0.1	11.2	2.5	0.6

== Results ==
Party		Votes	%	+/-	Seats	+/-
Central Denmark Region
A	Social Democrats	177,773	23.89	-5.43	8	-5
V	Venstre	142,413	19.14	-5.54	6	-5
F	Green Left	79,980	10.75	+3.53	4	+1
C	Conservatives	67,884	9.12	-2.96	3	-3
Æ	Denmark Democrats	58,639	7.88	New	2	New
I	Liberal Alliance	48,418	6.51	+4.78	2	+2
O	Danish People's Party	43,289	5.82	+1.86	2	+1
Ø	Red-Green Alliance	38,323	5.15	-0.96	1	-1
B	Social Liberals	35,599	4.78	-0.26	2	0
P	Psychiatry List	14,614	1.96	+0.09	1	0
K	Christian Democrats	12,955	1.74	-0.97	0	-1
Å	The Alternative	9,815	1.32	+0.52	0	0
M	Moderates	8,733	1.17	New	0	New
D	New Right	2,284	0.31	-3.36	0	-1
Y	Velfærdsdemokraterne	1,919	0.26	New	0	New
R	Folkelisten for fred og velfærd	1,523	0.20	New	0	New
Total		744,161	100	N/A	31	N/A
Invalid votes		2,203	0.20	-0.07		
Blank votes		32,374	2.96	+0.42		
Turnout		778,738	71.10	+4.21		
Source: valg.dk

== Opinion polls ==
Polling firm	Fieldwork date	Sample size	A	V	C	F	Ø	B	O	D	K	P	I	Å	M	R	Y	Æ	Others	Lead
Epinion	4 Sep - 13 Oct 2025	521	22.7	18.3	7.4	12.3	6.7	2.3	4.3	–	–	–	9.2	0.8	2.2	–	–	12.6	1.1	4.4
2024 european parliament election	9 Jun 2024		14.9	16.3	9.2	16.8	5.4	6.7	6.0	–	–	–	7.4	2.6	5.7	–	–	9.2	–	0.5
2022 general election	1 Nov 2022		26.2	15.6	6.0	8.0	4.4	3.6	2.0	3.4	0.9	–	9.0	2.9	7.9	–	–	9.6	–	10.6
2021 municipal elections	16 Nov 2021		28.4	25.6	13.0	8.2	5.4	5.3	3.6	3.4	2.0	–	1.5	0.8	–	–	–	–	–	2.8
2021 regional election	16 Nov 2021		29.3 (13)	24.7 (11)	12.1 (6)	7.2 (3)	6.1 (2)	5.0 (2)	4.0 (1)	3.7 (1)	2.7 (1)	1.9 (1)	1.7 (0)	0.8 (0)	–	–	–	–	–	4.6
