= 2025 Brøndby municipal election =

Municipal election in Denmark

← 2021	18 November 2025	2029 →

All 19 seats to the Brøndby municipal council 10 seats needed for a majority
- Turnout: 17,245 (56.2%) ▲0.7%
	First party	Second party	Third party
	A	O	Ø
Party	Social Democrats	Danish People's Party	Red-Green Alliance
Last election	11 seats, 53.5%	1 seat, 6.0%	1 seat, 7.8%
Seats won	8	4	2
Seat change	▼3	▲3	▲1
Popular vote	6,674	2,577	1,702
Percentage	39.5%	15.3%	10.1%
Swing	▼14.0%	▲9.2%	▲2.3%
	Fourth party	Fifth party	Sixth party
	C	F	B
Party	Conservatives	Green Left	Social Liberals
Last election	2 seats, 7.6%	1 seat, 6.2%	1 seat, 5.3%
Seats won	2	2	1
Seat change	0	▲1	0
Popular vote	1,623	1,621	1,056
Percentage	9.6%	9.6%	6.3%
Swing	▲2.1%	▲3.4%	▲1.0%
	Seventh party
	V
Party	Venstre
Last election	1 seat, 6.5%
Seats won	0
Seat change	▼1
Popular vote	595
Percentage	3.5%
Swing	▼3.0%
Mayor before election
Maja Højgaard
Social Democrats
Mayor after election
Maja Højgaard
Social Democrats

The 2025 Brøndby Municipal election was held on November 18, 2025, to elect the 19 members to sit in the regional council for the Brøndby Municipal council, in the period of 2026 to 2029. Maja Højgaard from the Social Democrats, would secure re-election.

== Background ==
Following the 2021 election, Kent Magelund from Social Democrats became mayor for his second full term. However, Kent Magelund, entered pension from the May 31, 2024, leading to Maja Højgaard, from the Social Democrats as well, taking over the mayoral position. She would run for her first full term in this election.

== Electoral system ==
For elections to Danish municipalities, a number varying from 9 to 31 are chosen to be elected to the municipal council. The seats are then allocated using the D'Hondt method and a closed list proportional representation. Brøndby Municipality had 19 seats in 2025.

== Electoral alliances ==
=== Electoral Alliance 1 ===
Party		Political alignment
A	Social Democrats	Centre-left
F	Green Left	Centre-left to Left-wing

=== Electoral Alliance 2 ===
Party		Political alignment
B	Social Liberals	Centre to Centre-left
K	Christian Democrats	Centre to Centre-right
M	Moderates	Centre to Centre-right

=== Electoral Alliance 3 ===
Party		Political alignment
C	Conservatives	Centre-right
I	Liberal Alliance	Centre-right to Right-wing
O	Danish People's Party	Right-wing to Far-right
V	Venstre	Centre-right

== Results by polling station ==
Division	A	B	C	F	I	K	M	O	V	Ø
Division	%	%	%	%	%	%	%	%	%	%
Brøndbyvester Skole	34.8	4.8	12.3	10.3	5.2	0.5	2.4	18.5	4.6	6.7
Tjørnehøjhallen	36.2	4.2	9.5	10.9	4.2	0.1	1.8	18.6	4.7	9.6
Lindelundshallen	41.3	2.6	10.5	12.0	2.8	0.6	2.0	16.3	3.7	8.4
Nørregård	41.3	5.3	9.5	9.9	2.4	0.6	1.8	15.7	2.9	10.7
Kulturhuset Brønden	41.5	8.8	9.1	7.7	3.4	0.2	2.7	12.2	2.7	11.7
Søholthallen	41.7	11.5	7.2	7.3	2.8	0.4	3.2	10.5	2.8	12.5

== Results ==
Party		Votes	%	+/-	Seats	+/-
Brøndby Municipality
A	Social Democrats	6,674	39.54	-13.96	8	-3
O	Danish People's Party	2,577	15.27	+9.23	4	+3
Ø	Red-Green Alliance	1,702	10.08	+2.26	2	+1
C	Conservatives	1,623	9.61	+2.05	2	0
F	Green Left	1,621	9.60	+3.39	2	+1
B	Social Liberals	1,056	6.26	+0.98	1	0
V	Venstre	595	3.52	-3.02	0	-1
I	Liberal Alliance	580	3.44	+1.66	0	0
M	Moderates	385	2.28	New	0	New
K	Christian Democrats	67	0.40	New	0	New
Total		16,880	100	N/A	19	N/A
Invalid votes		101	0.33	-0.02		
Blank votes		264	0.86	+0.35		
Turnout		17,245	56.24	+0.72		
Source: valg.dk

== Opinion polls ==
Polling firm	Fieldwork date	Sample size	A	Ø	C	V	F	O	B	I	K	M	Others	Lead
Epinion	4 Sep - 13 Oct 2025	452	46.7	10.0	7.6	2.4	9.8	15.0	1.5	4.8	–	2.1	0.1	31.7
2024 european parliament election	9 Jun 2024		22.5	11.9	6.8	8.3	17.5	10.2	5.0	5.1	–	5.4	–	5.0
2022 general election	1 Nov 2022		36.4	6.0	3.7	7.1	8.7	5.2	3.1	5.2	0.6	7.6	–	27.7
2021 regional election	16 Nov 2021		42.7	7.7	10.6	7.7	7.9	6.8	5.3	1.2	0.3	–	–	32.1
2021 municipal election	16 Nov 2021		53.5 (11)	7.8 (1)	7.6 (2)	6.5 (1)	6.2 (1)	6.0 (1)	5.3 (1)	1.8 (0)	–	–	–	45.7
