= 2021 Ishøj municipal election =

← 2017	16 November 2021	2025 →

All 19 seats to the Ishøj Municipal Council 10 seats needed for a majority
- Turnout: 17,837 (56.3%) ▼4.3pp
	First party	Second party	Third party
	A	L	V
Party	Social Democrats	Ishøjlisten	Venstre
Last election	11 seat, 51.5%	Did Not Stand	3 seats, 13.8%
Seats won	9	3	2
Seat change	▼2	▲3	▼1
Popular vote	3,713	1,608	1,055
Percentage	37.8%	16.4%	10.7%
Swing	▼13.7%	New	▼3.1%
	Fourth party	Fifth party	Sixth party
	F	M	C
Party	Green Left	Annelise Madsen	Conservatives
Last election	2 seats, 9.2%	Did Not Stand	0 seats, 4.0%
Seats won	2	1	1
Seat change	0	▲1	▲1
Popular vote	725	631	617
Percentage	7.4%	6.4%	6.3%
Swing	▼1.8%	New	▲2.3%
	Seventh party	Eighth party
	Ø	O
Party	Red–Green Alliance	Danish People's Party
Last election	1 seat, 6.8%	2 seats, 11.2%
Seats won	1	0
Seat change	0	▼2
Popular vote	375	396
Percentage	3.8%	4.0%
Swing	▼3.0%	▼7.2%
Mayor before election
Ole Bjørstorp
Ishøjlisten (Note: Was elected as member of the Social Democrats following the 2017 election)
Mayor after election
Merete Amdisen
Social Democrats

Ever since 1970, the Social Democrats had held the mayor's position in the municipality. In the previous three elections, they had also won an absolute majority.

Ole Bjørstorp who had become mayor following the 2017 election, would not stand for re-election as a Social Democrat. In February 2021 he had started a new party called Ishøjlisten, after the Social Democrats told him that he would not be their mayoral candidate for this election.

In the election, the Social Democrats would lose its absolute majority. However they would still be able to win the mayor's position, after an agreement between the Conservatives, Green Left, Venstre and the Red–Green Alliance was reached.

== Electoral system ==
For elections to Danish municipalities, a number varying from 9 to 31 are chosen to be elected to the municipal council. The seats are then allocated using the D'Hondt method and a closed list proportional representation. Ishøj Municipality had 19 seats in 2021

Unlike in Danish General Elections, in elections to municipal councils, electoral alliances are allowed.

== Electoral alliances ==
=== Electoral Alliance 1 ===
Party		Political alignment
L	Ishøjlisten	Local politics
M	Annelise Madsen	Local politics

=== Electoral Alliance 2 ===
Party		Political alignment
A	Social Democrats	Centre-left
C	Conservatives	Centre-right
O	Danish People's Party	Right-wing to Far-right
V	Venstre	Centre-right

=== Electoral Alliance 3 ===
Party		Political alignment
B	Social Liberals	Centre to Centre-left
F	Green Left	Centre-left to Left-wing
Ø	Red–Green Alliance	Left-wing to Far-Left

== Results by polling station ==
Division	A	B	C	D	F	L	M	O	V	Æ	Ø
Division	%	%	%	%	%	%	%	%	%	%	%
Ishøj Landsby	27.4	3.3	11.3	4.1	5.6	8.8	5.2	5.6	24.8	0.2	3.9
Vibeholmskolen	40.8	3.7	7.0	3.5	6.5	13.1	7.5	3.4	10.3	0.3	3.8
Gildbroskolen	38.8	3.6	5.0	4.1	7.2	18.4	5.6	4.5	8.7	0.4	3.7
Strandgårdskolen	44.3	3.5	2.9	2.2	10.7	23.5	3.1	3.1	3.4	0.4	3.0
Ishøj Bycenter	33.6	3.8	7.5	3.0	6.3	14.5	9.4	4.2	13.0	0.2	4.5

== Results ==
Party		Votes	%	+/-	Seats	+/-
Ishøj Municipality
A	Social Democrats	3,713	37.76	-13.74	9	-2
L	Ishøjlisten	1,608	16.35	New	3	New
V	Venstre	1,055	10.73	-3.02	2	-1
F	Green Left	725	7.37	-1.81	2	0
M	Annelise Madsen	631	6.42	New	1	New
C	Conservatives	617	6.28	+2.32	1	+1
O	Danish People's Party	396	4.03	-7.23	0	-2
Ø	Red-Green Alliance	375	3.81	-2.93	1	0
B	Social Liberals	356	3.62	+1.36	0	0
D	New Right	327	3.33	New	0	New
Æ	Freedom List	29	0.29	New	0	New
Total		9,832	100	N/A	19	N/A
Invalid votes		95	0.53	+0.26		
Blank votes		108	0.61	+0.05		
Turnout		10,035	56.26	-3.38		
Source: valg.dk
