= 2025 Ishøj municipal election =

Municipal election in Denmark

| ← 2021 | 18 November 2025 | 2029 → |

All 19 seats to the Ishøj municipal council 10 seats needed for a majority
- Turnout: 10,462 (57.5%) ▲1.2%
| | First party | Second party | Third party |
|---|---|---|---|
| | A | L | F |
| Party | Social Democrats | Ishøjlisten | Green Left |
| Last election | 9 seats, 37.8% | 3 seats, 16.4% | 2 seats, 7.4% |
| Seats won | 7 | 3 | 2 |
| Seat change | ▼2 | 0 | 0 |
| Popular vote | 3,491 | 1,221 | 1,110 |
| Percentage | 34.1% | 11.9% | 10.8% |
| Swing | ▼3.7% | ▼4.4% | ▲3.5% |
| | Fourth party | Fifth party | Sixth party |
| | D | V | O |
| Party | IshøjDemokraterne | Venstre | Danish People's Party |
| Last election | Did not stand | 2 seats, 10.7% | 0 seats, 4.0% |
| Seats won | 2 | 2 | 1 |
| Seat change | ▲2 | 0 | ▲1 |
| Popular vote | 1,071 | 751 | 730 |
| Percentage | 10.5% | 7.3% | 7.1% |
| Swing | New | ▼3.4% | ▲3.1% |
| | Seventh party | Eighth party | Ninth party |
| | I | B | Ø |
| Party | Liberal Alliance | Social Liberals | Red-Green Alliance |
| Last election | Did not stand | 0 seats, 3.6% | 1 seat, 3.8% |
| Seats won | 1 | 1 | 0 |
| Seat change | ▲1 | ▲1 | ▼1 |
| Popular vote | 501 | 409 | 457 |
| Percentage | 4.9% | 4.0% | 4.5% |
| Swing | New | ▲0.4% | ▲0.6% |
Mayor before election
Merete Amdisen
Social Democrats
Mayor after election
Merete Amdisen
Social Democrats

The 2025 Ishøj Municipal election was held on November 18, 2025, to elect the 19 members to sit in the regional council for the Ishøj Municipal council, in the period of 2026 to 2029. Merete Amdisen from the Social Democrats, would secure re-election.

== Background ==
Following the 2021 election, Merete Amdisen from Social Democrats became mayor for her first term. She would run for a second term.

== Electoral system ==
For elections to Danish municipalities, a number varying from 9 to 31 are chosen to be elected to the municipal council. The seats are then allocated using the D'Hondt method and a closed list proportional representation. Ishøj Municipality had 19 seats in 2025.

== Electoral alliances ==
=== Electoral Alliance 1 ===
| Party | | Political alignment |
|---|---|---|
| A | Social Democrats | Centre-left |
| Ø | Red-Green Alliance | Left-wing to Far-Left |

=== Electoral Alliance 2 ===
| Party | | Political alignment |
|---|---|---|
| B | Social Liberals | Centre to Centre-left |
| D | IshøjDemokraterne | Local politics |
| F | Green Left | Centre-left to Left-wing |
| L | Ishøjlisten | Local politics |
| M | Moderates | Centre to Centre-right |

=== Electoral Alliance 3 ===
| Party | | Political alignment |
|---|---|---|
| C | Conservatives | Centre-right |
| V | Venstre | Centre-right |

=== Electoral Alliance 4 ===
| Party | | Political alignment |
|---|---|---|
| I | Liberal Alliance | Centre-right to Right-wing |
| O | Danish People's Party | Right-wing to Far-right |

== Results by polling station ==
| Division | A | B | C | D | F | I | L | M | O | V | Ø |
| Division | % | % | % | % | % | % | % | % | % | % | % |
|---|---|---|---|---|---|---|---|---|---|---|---|
| Ishøj Landsby | 22.4 | 3.4 | 13.0 | 6.0 | 7.1 | 7.1 | 5.6 | 1.0 | 9.4 | 22.0 | 3.0 |
| Vibeholmskolen | 34.3 | 4.2 | 2.4 | 11.6 | 9.7 | 5.1 | 12.7 | 1.8 | 7.5 | 6.8 | 3.9 |
| Gildbroskolen | 37.8 | 3.7 | 1.8 | 8.9 | 10.1 | 5.4 | 13.1 | 1.3 | 8.4 | 5.5 | 3.9 |
| Strandgårdskolen | 37.0 | 4.3 | 1.0 | 5.8 | 15.0 | 2.6 | 17.5 | 2.4 | 5.7 | 2.2 | 6.5 |
| Ishøj Bycenter | 33.0 | 4.0 | 2.3 | 17.0 | 10.5 | 5.2 | 8.2 | 2.2 | 5.8 | 7.4 | 4.4 |

== Results ==
| Party | | Votes | % | +/- | Seats | +/- |
Ishøj Municipality
| A | Social Democrats | 3,491 | 34.08 | -3.69 | 7 | -2 |
| L | Ishøjlisten | 1,221 | 11.92 | -4.44 | 3 | 0 |
| F | Green Left | 1,110 | 10.84 | +3.46 | 2 | 0 |
| D | IshøjDemokraterne | 1,071 | 10.45 | New | 2 | New |
| V | Venstre | 751 | 7.33 | -3.40 | 2 | 0 |
| O | Danish People's Party | 730 | 7.13 | +3.10 | 1 | +1 |
| I | Liberal Alliance | 501 | 4.89 | New | 1 | New |
| Ø | Red-Green Alliance | 457 | 4.46 | +0.65 | 0 | -1 |
| B | Social Liberals | 409 | 3.99 | +0.37 | 1 | +1 |
| C | Conservatives | 316 | 3.08 | -3.19 | 0 | -1 |
| M | Moderates | 187 | 1.83 | New | 0 | New |
| Total | | 10,244 | 100 | N/A | 19 | N/A |
| Invalid votes | | 90 | 0.49 | -0.04 | | |
| Blank votes | | 128 | 0.70 | +0.12 | | |
| Turnout | | 10,462 | 57.49 | +1.23 | | |
Source: valg.dk

== Opinion polls ==
| Polling firm | Fieldwork date | Sample size | A | L | V | F | C | O | Ø | B | D | I | M | Others | Lead |
|---|---|---|---|---|---|---|---|---|---|---|---|---|---|---|---|
| Epinion | 4 Sep - 13 Oct 2025 | 435 | 39.4 | – | 6.4 | 9.7 | 3.3 | 12.1 | 7.7 | 2.0 | – | 6.3 | 2.1 | 11.0 | 27.3 |
| 2024 european parliament election | 9 Jun 2024 | | 21.5 | – | 9.2 | 14.7 | 7.1 | 10.0 | 12.6 | 5.7 | – | 5.0 | 5.9 | – | 6.8 |
| 2022 general election | 1 Nov 2022 | | 32.7 | – | 7.9 | 7.9 | 3.5 | 5.2 | 5.5 | 3.8 | – | 5.3 | 8.4 | – | 24.3 |
| 2021 regional election | 16 Nov 2021 | | 43.0 | – | 9.8 | 6.9 | 10.0 | 6.0 | 6.5 | 6.0 | – | 1.1 | – | – | 33.0 |
| 2021 municipal election | 16 Nov 2021 | | 37.8 (9) | 16.4 (3) | 10.7 (2) | 7.4 (2) | 6.3 (1) | 4.0 (0) | 3.8 (1) | 3.6 (0) | – | – | – | – | 21.4 |
