= Communist Unification =

Communist organisation in Denmark

Communist Unification (Danish: Kommunistisk Samling, KS) was a communist organisation in Denmark. It was founded in November 2005, following a split from the Communist Party in Denmark. It claimed 42 members at the time of its foundation.

In November 2006, KS merged with Communist Party of Denmark (Marxist-Leninist) and formed the Communist Party. At the time of the dissolution of KS, the organisation claimed to have 85 members.
