= Patrick Mac Manus =

Irish-Danish political activist

- Born: 1967
- Died: 12 August 2011 (aged 66–67)
- Political party: Communist Party (Denmark)

Patrick Mac Manus (1944 - 12 August 2011 ) was an Irish-Danish political activist. Mac Manus immigrated to Denmark in 1966 and remained there the rest of his life. His activism included supporting the FARC rebels in the Colombian civil war; campaigning against the Turkish Occupation of Cyprus, and supporting the recognition of the Armenian and Greek genocides, he supported the creation of a Kurdish state in the Kurdish conflict in Turkey, and called for the cessation of The Troubles, against neoliberalism and also against the authoritarian governments of the Arab States. Mac Manus was a member of the Communist Party (Denmark).

In the 2004, Mac Manus became a leading member of Foreningen Oprør ("Rebellion"), a pro-Communist organisation. In August 2005, due to his activity on behalf of Foreningen Oprør, Mac Manus was arrested by Danish police and questioned about attempting to provide financial aid to a number of groups on EU's list of banned terrorist organisations, which included FARC, Euskadi Ta Askatasuna and the Popular Front for the Liberation of Palestine (PFLP). In 2008 the Columbian Minister of Justice called upon the Danish government to extradite Mac Manus to Columbia to stand trial. On 15 March 2010 Mac Manus was sentenced to 6 months' probation in Denmark for attempting to violate section 114b of the Criminal Code on support for terrorist organizations by soliciting financial support for FARC and PFLP.

Mac Manus died on 12 August 2011
