= Communist Party of Denmark/Marxist–Leninists =

Communist Party of Denmark/Marxist-Leninists Danmarks Kommunistiske Parti/Marxister-Leninister
- Leader: Klaus Riis, Jørgen Petersen
- Founded: 1978
- Dissolved: 2006
- Newspaper: Arbejderen
- Youth wing: Kommunistisk Ungdoms Forbund (KUF or KUF/ml)-Communist Youth Marxist–Leninists; Communist Youth Association (discontinued approx. 1990) young people associated with Rød Ungdom
- Ideology: Communism; Marxism-Leninism; Anti-revisionism; Hoxhaism
- International affiliation: Pro-Albanian camp

The Communist Party of Denmark/Marxist–Leninists (Danish: Danmarks Kommunistiske Parti/Marxister-Leninister, DKP/ML) was a political party in Denmark, that advocated revolutionary communism.

The party was established in 1978 from the merger of two Marxist-Leninist parties: Marxistisk-Leninistisk Forbund and Kommunistisk Sammenslutning. The DKP/ML itself ceased to exist in 2006 when it merged with Kommunistisk Samling to form Kommunistisk Parti. The Communist Youth Marxist–Leninists.

== History ==
=== Origins ===
The DKP/ML was founded in 1978. It was created through the merger of the Marxistisk-Leninistisk Forbund (MLF) and Kommunistisk Sammenslutning (marxister-leninister) (KSML). Both of these parties had been formed in the 1970s as splinter groups, expelled from the Kommunistisk Arbejderparti.

MLF had been expelled from Kommunistisk Arbejderparti in 1976, after having criticized the class analysis and problems of internal democracy of the party. MLF was based in Odense and had denounced the Three Worlds Theory formulated by Mao Zedong and propagated by the Chinese Communist Party.

The KSML split from the Kommunistisk Arbejderparti in May 1978, under the belief that the party had become revisionist. KSML maintained a staunchly pro-Albanian rhetoric and was briefly based in Copenhagen before it merged with MLF within months of its foundation. MLF and KSML officially merged in December 1978, creating a party with a joint membership of approximately 50 people.

=== Rhetoric (1978–2006) ===
After it was founded, the DKP/ML took a stand with Enver Hoxha's Albania and the Albanian Party of Labor granted it official recognition. After the fall of the Albanian Communist party in the 1990s, the party began to reconcile its differences with other communist parties in Denmark and sought to make its political newspaper, Arbejderen, a voice for the broader left wing. The majority of party members were in favor of unification with other communist groups, and the party sought a merger as a result. This led to the party's eventual dissolution in 2006 when it merged with Kommunistisk Samling to form the Kommunistisk Parti.

The DKP/ML took part in elections in 1984 and 1987, under the party letter L, but got less than 1,000 votes in each election. The DKP/ML published two political newspapers: Arbejderen and Partiets Vej. Arbejderen continues to be published by the party's successor, Kommunistisk Parti.

Folketing election results
Year	Votes	%	Seats
1984	978	0,03%	0
1987	987	0,03%	0
