= Communist Youth Marxist–Leninists =

Kommunistisk Ungdom Marxister-Leninister (KUML, Communist Youth Marxist–Leninists), was a political youth movement in Denmark. KUML was the youth wing of Kommunistisk Forbund Marxister-Leninister. KUML was founded in 1969, as a split from Socialistisk Ungdoms Forum. KUML was disbanded in 1971, and its members joined KFML.

== See also ==
- Communist Union (Marxist–Leninists)
