= Psychiatry List (political party) =

Danish regional political party

Psychiatry List Psykiatri-Listen
- Abbreviation: P
- Leader: Rose-Marie Mollerup
- Founded: 2017
- Ideology: Single-issue
- Regional councils: 1 / 205

Website
- https://psykiatri-listen.dk/

The Psychiatry List is a Danish regional political party for the Central Denmark Region. It was founded to stand in the 2017 Central Denmark Regional Election, with focus on improvement for personnel and patients in the Danish psychiatry.

It won a seat in 2017 with 2.9% of the vote. The party would continue to be represented in the regional council until Peter Møller Andersen who was the party's member at the time, having taken over from Mikkel Rasmussen earlier in the term, switched his party affiliation to the Social Democrats.

It would stand again in the 2021 Central Denmark Regional Election, and would once again win a seat despite decreasing their vote share to 1.9%.

Rose-Marie Mollerup, who was elected in the 2021 election, still represents the party in the regional council of the Central Denmark Region.

== Election results ==
=== Regional elections (Note: Of Central Denmark Region seats) ===
Date	Votes		Seats	±
Date	#	%	Seats	±
2017	20,547	2.9	1 / 41	New
2021	13,196	1.9	1 / 41	0
2025	14,614	2.0	1 / 31	0
