= Anders Kühnau =

Danish politician (born 1981)

Anders Kühnau Hansen
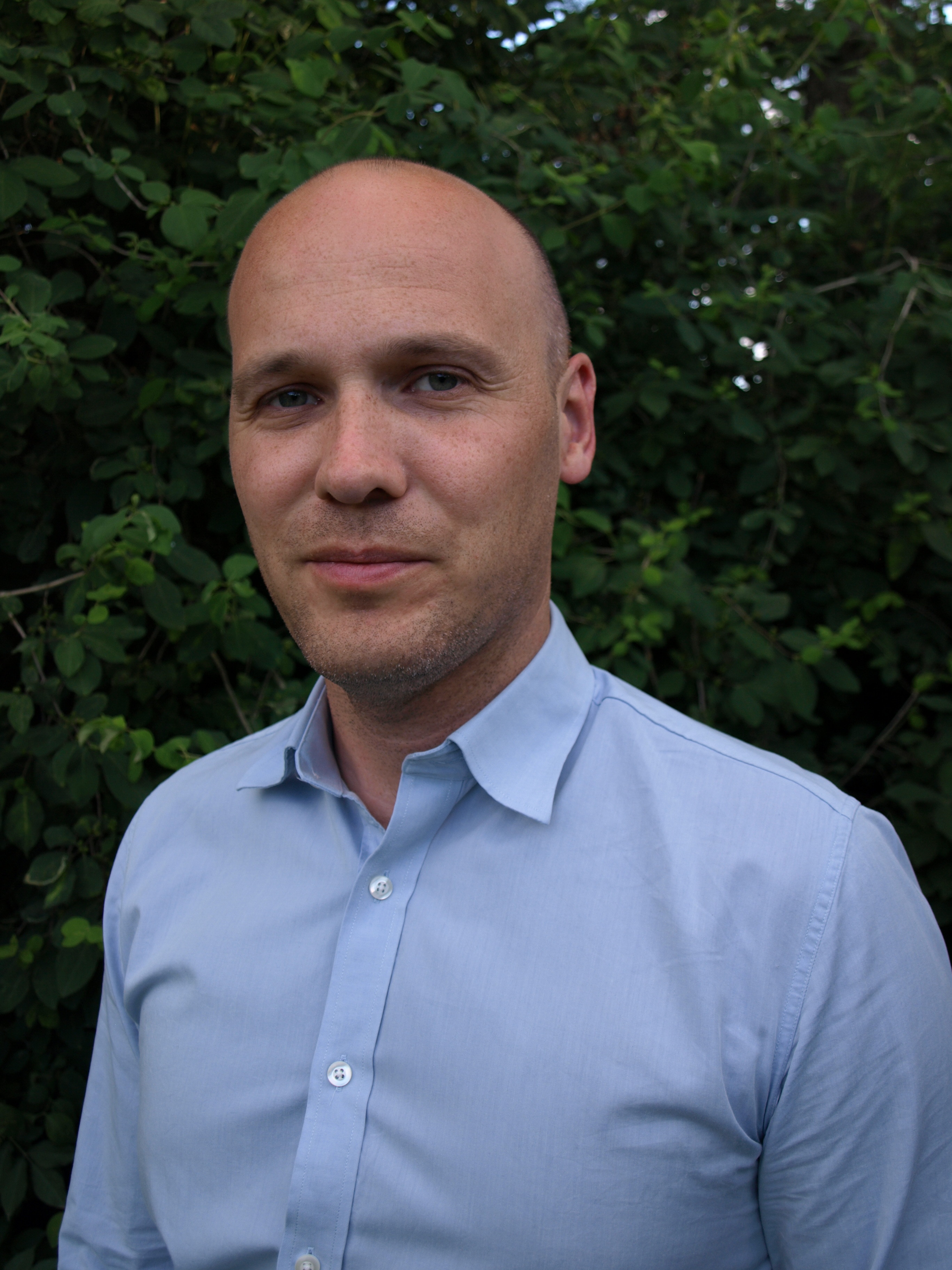
- Kühnau in 2016

Regionsrådet, Central Denmark Region

Personal details
- Born: 12 August 1981 (age 44) Odense, Denmark
- Party: Danish Social Democrats
- Education: Political science
- Alma mater: Aarhus University
- Website: kuhnau.dk

Anders Kühnau Hansen (born 12 August 1981) is a Danish politician and the chairperson of the regionsråd (regional parliament) of Central Denmark Region since 2018. He is elected on behalf of the Danish Social Democrats. He has been a member of the regionsråd since 2006.

== Biography ==
Kühnau started the Social Democratic Youth of Denmark, where he was the chairperson of the Aarhus department from 1999 to 2001. In 2000 he started studying Political Science at Aarhus University, where he finished his degree in 2008.

In 2005 he was elected for the regionsråd, and became the Social Democrats political spokesperson in 2009.

In 2013 he was elected for the Horsens Municipal Council, where he held the position for a single period. In 2016 he became the vice-chairperson of the Central Jutland regionsråd.

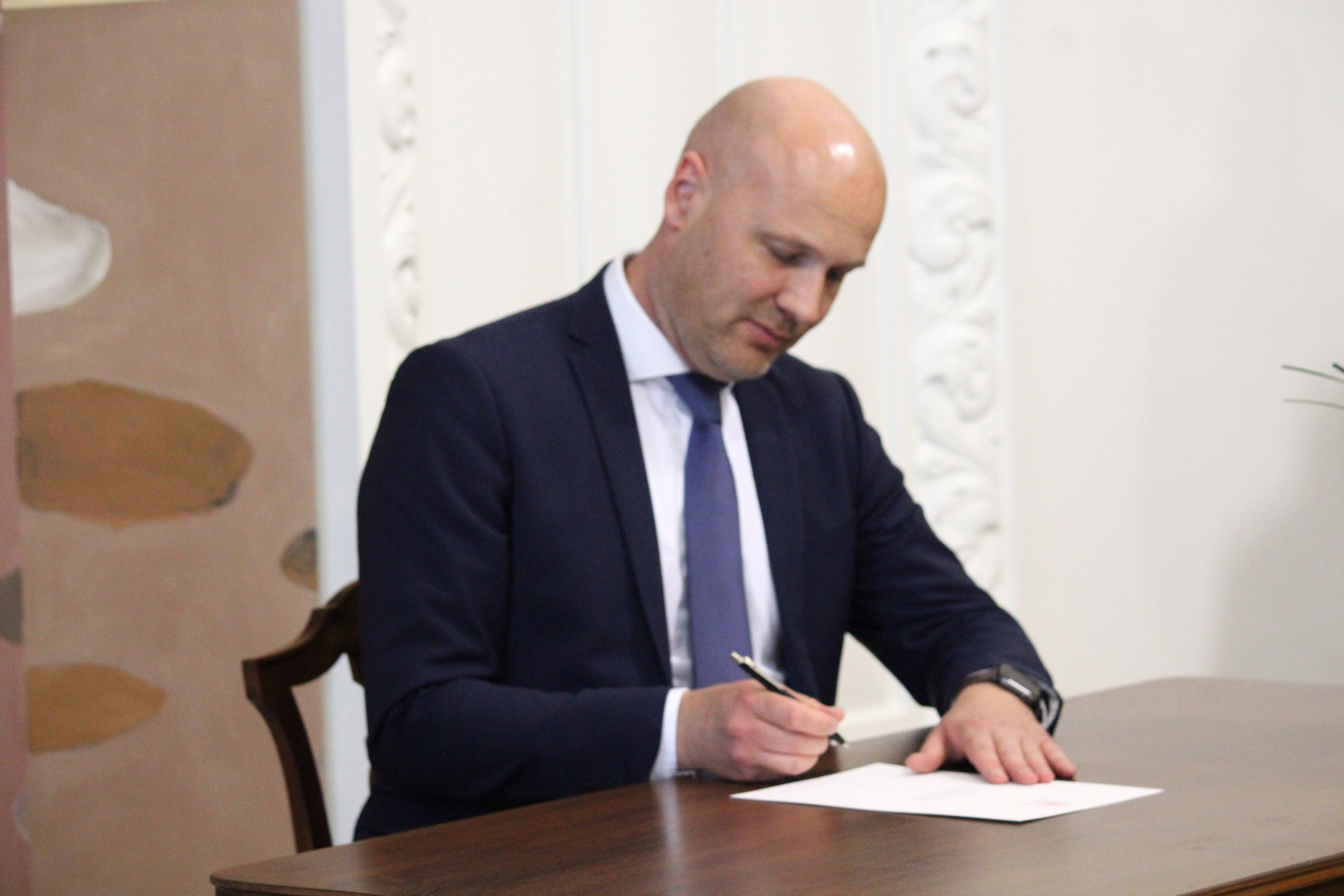
Kühnau signing a pledge to uphold the Danish Constitution at Christiansborg, 14 April 2026

At the 2017 Danish local elections, he was elected chairperson. He was chosen as the socialdemocratic candidate to replace Bent Hansen.
