= Arbejderen =

Online newspaper in Denmark

- Type: Online newspaper
- Founded: 1 September 1982
- Ceased publication: 2019 (print)
- Political alignment: Communist
- Language: Danish
- Headquarters: Copenhagen
- Country: Denmark
- Website: https://arbejderen.dk/

Arbejderen (Danish: Worker), also known as Dagbladet Arbejderen (Danish: Daily Worker), is an online newspaper which is official media outlet of the Denmark's Communist Party. It was a print daily newspaper between 1982 and 2019.

== History and profile ==
Arbejderen was started as an official organ of the Communist Association Marxist-Leninists, a break away group from the Communist Party, in 1982. Its first issue appeared on 1 September that year. The paper is headquartered in Copenhagen. It replaced Gnisten, another publication of the party. The paper was later renamed as Dagbladet Arbejderen. In 2007 it began to be published from Tuesday to Saturday by the Communist Party. In 2009 its circulation was approximately 1500 copies. Birthe Sørensen was the editor-in-chief of Arbejderen. She was replaced by Anders Sørensen in April 2019 when she resigned from the post after 19 years. The paper expresses the policies of the Communist Party in its editorials and articles.

From 1 May 2019 the print edition of Arbejderen ceased publication, and it became an online-only periodical. The reason for KP's decision to stop publishing Arbejderen as a paper newspaper was, among other things, cuts in media subsidies and rapidly rising distribution costs. Editor-in-chief, Birthe Sørensen, explained: "The whole situation is putting pressure on our finances and has made it difficult for us to maintain a satisfactory quality in the paper newspaper. Therefore, we have now decided to focus 100 percent on the online media. Unlike the paper newspaper, Arbejderen's website is growing and has seen an increase in readership over several years. Almost 60,000 users click on arbejderen.dk every month."
