= Cannabis Party (Denmark) =

Cannabis Party, Hemp Party Hampepartiet
- Leader: Klaus Trier Tuxen
- Founded: 2001
- Headquarters: Copenhagen
- Ideology: Cannabis legalisation Free Cannabis
- National affiliation: The Free Hash Movement
- International affiliation: Global Marijuana March
- Regions: 0 / 205
- Municipal councils: 0 / 2,432

Election symbol
- List J (Liste J); J

Website
- www.hampepartiet.dk

The Cannabis Party or The Hemp Party (Danish: Hampepartiet), The hemp party - List J (Danish: Hampepartiet - Liste J) is a single issue, local political party in Denmark. The party stands for the legalisation of cannabis.

== History ==
The party was founded in 2001 with the only goal to legalise cannabis in Denmark.

The party has run in all municipal elections since its foundation, as well as the elections for regional councils in 2009 and 2013.
They intend to run in a Folketing election, but have not yet managed to do so.

== Election results ==
=== Municipal councils ===
| Date | Seats | |
| Date | # | ± |
|---|---|---|
| 2001 | 0 / 4,647 | New |
| 2005 | 0 / 2,522 | 0 |
| 2009 | 0 / 2,468 | 0 |
| 2013 | 0 / 2,444 | 0 |
| 2017 | 0 / 2,432 | 0 |

=== Amt & Regional elections ===
| Date | Votes | Seats | |
| Date | Votes | # | ± |
|---|---|---|---|
| 2001–2005 | Did not run | | |
| 2009 | 3,179 | 0 / 205 | New |
| 2013 | 3,175 | 0 / 205 | 0 |
| 2017 | | 0 / 205 | 0 |
