= 2021 Capital of Denmark regional election =

2021 regional election

- 16 November 2021

All 41 seats to the Capital of Denmark regional Council 21 seats needed for a majority
- Turnout: 954,456 (64.7%) ▼2.8pp
	First party	Second party	Third party
	C	A	Ø
Party	Conservatives	Social Democrats	Red–Green Alliance
Last election	5 seats, 11.2%	13 seats, 28.4%	4 seats, 10.0%
Seats won	10	9	6
Seat change	▲5	▼4	▲2
Popular vote	190,020	209,111	120,907
Percentage	20.7%	22.8%	13.2%
Swing	▲9.5%	▼5.6%	▲3.2%
	Fourth party	Fifth party	Sixth party
	V	B	F
Party	Venstre	Social Liberals	Green Left
Last election	6 seats, 13.8%	3 seats, 8.1%	3 seats, 6.3%
Seats won	5	5	4
Seat change	▼1	▲2	▲1
Popular vote	98,148	93,528	85,602
Percentage	10.7%	10.2%	9.3%
Swing	▼3.1%	▲2.1%	▲3.0%
	Seventh party	Eighth party	Ninth party
	O	D	I
Party	Danish People's Party	New Right	Liberal Alliance
Last election	3 seats, 8.1%	0 seats, 1.4%	2 seats, 4.3%
Seats won	1	1	0
Seat change	▼2	▲1	▼2
Popular vote	31,636	28,686	17,963
Percentage	3.4%	3.1%	2.0%
Swing	▼4.7%	▲1.7%	▼2.3%
Chairperson before election
Lars Gaardhøj (Note: Sophie Hæstorp Andersen became chairperson following the last election, but Lars Gaardhøj took over in June 2021)
Social Democrats
Chairperson after election
Lars Gaardhøj
Social Democrats

The 2021 Capital of Denmark regional election was held on November 16, 2021, to elect the 41 members to sit in the regional council for the Capital Region of Denmark, in the period of 2022 to 2025.

Priro to this election and ever since the creation of the 5 Danish regions in the 2007 Municipal reform, the Social Democrats had been the largest party and held the chairperson's seat for the Capital Region of Denmark. Following the 2017 election, Sophie Hæstorp Andersen had won her second term as the chairperson.

However, in November 2020 it was announced that Hæstorp Andersen would become the candidate of the Social Democrats for the Lord Mayor position in the 2021 Copenhagen City Council election, and she was therefore unable to stand in this election. She would step down in June 2021, with Lars Gaardhøj taking over.

In the election result, due to electoral alliances, the Conservatives won the most seats despite not having received the highest vote share. However the parties commonly associated with the red bloc won 24 seats. It was later announced that Lars Gaardhøj would continue as the chairperson.

== Electoral Alliances ==
Electoral Alliance 1

Party		Political Position
C	Conservatives	Centre-right
D	New Right	Far-right
I	Liberal Alliance	Centre-right to Right-wing
K	Christian Democrats	Centre to Centre-right
O	Danish People's Party	Right-wing to Far-right
V	Venstre	Centre-right

Electoral Alliance 2

Party		Political Position
L	Lavere skatter og afgifter	Local Politics
Æ	Freedom List	Right-wing

Electoral Alliance 3

Party		Political Position
J	Hampepartiet	Cannabis legalisation
Q	Feministisk Initiativ	Local Politics
R	Kommunistisk Parti	Far-left
Ø	Red–Green Alliance	Left-wing to Far-left

Electoral Alliance 4

Party		Political Position
H	Lokalliste i Region Hovedstaden	Local Politics
U	Copenhagen	Local Politics
W	Odins Vikingehær	Local Politics
Y	Kærlighedspartiet (Regnbuef / Bef)	Local Politics

Electoral Alliance 5

Party		Political Position
B	Social Liberals	Centre to Centre-left
F	Green Left	Centre-left to Left-wing
G	Vegan Party	Centre-left to Left-wing
Å	The Alternative	Centre-left to Left-wing

== Results by constituencies and municipalities ==
This is a list of results of the following selected parties
A = Social Democrats
B = Social Liberals
C = Conservatives
D = New Right
F = Green Left
G = Vegan Party
H = Lokalliste i Region Hovedstaden
I = Liberal Alliance
K = Christian Democrats
J = Hampepartiet
L = Lavere skatter og afgifter
O = Danish People's Party
Q = Feministisk Initiativ
R = Communist Party (Denmark)
V = Venstre
Æ = Freedom List
Ø = Red–Green Alliance
Å = The Alternative

=== Constituencies ===
Division	A	B	C	D	F	G	H	I	J	K	L	O	Q	R	V	Æ	Ø	Å
Division	%	%	%	%	%	%	%	%	%	%	%	%	%	%	%	%	%	%
North Zealand	22.7	8.2	25.2	4.5	7.8	0.4	0.2	2.0	0.2	0.6	0.1	3.8	0.1	0.1	16.2	0.3	6.0	0.8
Greater Copenhagen	29.1	7.8	25.3	3.5	9.0	0.5	0.3	1.6	0.2	0.5	0.1	4.0	0.1	0.1	8.2	0.3	7.5	0.9
Copenhagen	17.8	13.5	15.8	2.1	11.0	0.8	0.1	2.2	0.2	0.4	0.1	2.2	0.2	0.2	8.3	0.4	21.8	1.6
Bornholm	38.4	2.0	4.5	1.7	2.0	0.5	0.0	0.4	0.2	3.9	0.2	14.9	0.1	0.0	20.5	0.3	8.9	0.7

=== Municipalities ===
Division	A	B	C	D	F	G	H	I	J	K	L	O	Q	R	V	Æ	Ø	Å
Division	%	%	%	%	%	%	%	%	%	%	%	%	%	%	%	%	%	%
Helsingør	24.5	7.0	31.8	5.8	6.8	0.6	0.0	1.6	0.2	0.3	0.1	4.8	0.1	0.1	6.4	0.3	7.8	2.5
Fredensborg	23.4	10.5	26.5	4.6	7.6	0.5	0.1	1.9	0.1	0.6	0.1	3.1	0.1	0.1	13.9	0.3	5.0	0.7
Hørsholm	11.7	7.5	41.7	3.6	3.3	0.3	0.1	3.1	0.1	0.4	0.1	2.3	0.1	0.1	22.7	0.1	2.0	0.3
Hillerød	24.2	7.8	18.8	4.3	10.3	0.5	0.1	1.8	0.1	1.4	0.1	3.8	0.1	0.0	18.0	0.4	6.8	0.5
Gribskov	20.0	4.9	22.3	6.8	7.5	0.5	0.1	1.3	0.3	1.6	0.2	5.6	0.1	0.1	19.9	0.4	6.8	0.4
Frederikssund	29.9	4.4	12.4	5.6	8.1	0.4	0.1	1.2	0.2	0.5	0.1	6.5	0.1	0.0	20.2	0.2	5.3	0.3
Halsnæs	33.5	3.3	10.0	4.9	11.9	0.4	0.0	0.7	0.2	0.5	0.1	4.6	0.1	0.1	20.5	0.3	6.2	1.6
Egedal	27.0	9.6	18.5	4.8	8.0	0.3	0.6	2.1	0.1	0.4	0.3	4.9	0.1	0.1	17.1	0.2	4.8	0.3
Furesø	24.9	12.4	26.2	2.4	7.3	0.4	0.1	3.1	0.1	0.4	0.1	1.8	0.1	0.1	11.2	0.4	7.4	0.9
Rudersdal	12.6	11.6	37.2	2.8	5.7	0.4	0.5	3.0	0.1	0.3	0.1	1.4	0.1	0.0	17.4	0.2	5.5	0.4
Allerød	17.2	9.2	29.2	3.5	10.2	0.4	0.1	1.6	0.2	0.5	0.1	1.7	0.2	0.0	19.3	0.2	5.4	0.3
Gentofte	8.2	9.6	57.3	2.0	5.7	0.5	0.1	2.1	0.1	0.3	0.1	0.8	0.1	0.1	6.2	0.3	5.6	0.3
Lyngby-Taarbæk	16.3	13.8	35.7	2.8	9.5	0.6	0.1	2.3	0.1	0.3	0.1	1.6	0.1	0.1	8.8	0.3	6.2	0.4
Gladsaxe	29.5	10.1	15.1	3.2	11.1	0.5	0.3	1.9	0.2	0.6	0.1	3.6	0.1	0.1	10.8	0.3	10.6	0.8
Rødovre	37.6	5.9	17.1	3.8	11.1	0.4	0.2	1.1	0.3	0.9	0.2	4.4	0.1	0.1	6.2	0.3	8.4	0.6
Herlev	37.7	5.5	17.9	3.5	10.4	0.3	0.1	1.4	0.2	0.9	0.2	3.8	0.1	0.1	6.4	0.3	9.6	0.6
Hvidovre	32.9	5.5	16.7	3.9	13.6	0.4	1.9	1.2	0.2	0.5	0.1	6.2	0.1	0.2	7.1	0.3	6.9	1.0
Brøndby	42.7	5.3	10.6	5.0	7.9	0.3	0.1	1.2	0.2	0.3	0.1	6.8	0.1	0.1	7.7	0.6	7.7	1.7
Ishøj	43.0	6.0	10.0	4.5	6.9	0.4	0.2	1.1	0.2	0.4	0.7	6.0	0.1	0.1	9.8	0.5	6.5	1.5
Vallensbæk	26.4	5.3	37.3	3.8	5.4	0.3	0.1	1.3	0.1	0.3	0.1	5.1	0.0	0.1	7.3	0.1	5.1	0.7
Høje-Taastrup	31.8	5.3	26.7	4.4	6.2	0.4	0.1	2.2	0.2	0.5	0.1	5.3	0.1	0.1	7.4	0.3	6.1	1.8
Albertslund	32.3	7.1	11.7	3.5	15.0	0.5	0.1	0.9	0.2	0.3	0.1	5.3	0.1	0.2	5.4	0.4	13.1	2.4
Ballerup	44.3	5.8	14.1	3.8	7.1	0.7	0.1	1.2	0.2	0.7	0.1	4.7	0.1	0.1	8.5	0.5	6.6	0.4
Glostrup	36.1	5.6	12.8	4.2	6.9	0.4	0.2	1.6	0.2	0.3	0.2	5.5	0.1	0.1	17.9	0.3	5.6	0.7
København	16.3	14.3	13.2	2.0	11.9	0.8	0.1	2.3	0.2	0.5	0.0	2.0	0.2	0.2	7.8	0.4	24.3	1.8
Frederiksberg	18.7	13.0	27.9	1.3	8.1	0.7	0.1	2.2	0.2	0.3	0.1	1.4	0.1	0.1	8.0	0.3	15.6	0.8
Tårnby	37.1	5.1	11.5	5.0	6.8	0.5	0.1	1.1	0.2	0.4	0.1	7.8	0.1	0.1	12.8	0.4	8.9	0.5
Dragør	20.5	7.7	32.0	3.5	6.2	0.5	0.1	1.7	0.1	0.2	0.1	4.1	0.0	0.0	16.5	0.2	4.9	0.3
Bornholm	38.4	2.0	4.5	1.7	2.0	0.5	0.0	0.4	0.2	3.9	0.2	14.9	0.1	0.0	20.5	0.3	8.9	0.7

== Results ==
Party		Votes	%	+/-	Seats	+/-
Capital of Denmark Region
A	Social Democrats	209,111	22.77	-5.60	9	-4
C	Conservatives	190,020	20.69	+9.52	10	+5
Ø	Red-Green Alliance	120,907	13.17	+3.08	6	+2
V	Venstre	98,148	10.69	-3.08	5	-1
B	Social Liberals	93,528	10.19	+2.19	5	+2
F	Green Left	85,602	9.32	+2.97	4	+1
O	Danish People's Party	31,636	3.45	-4.67	1	-2
D	New Right	28,686	3.12	+1.68	1	+1
I	Liberal Alliance	17,963	1.96	-2.35	0	-2
Å	The Alternative	10,144	1.10	-3.61	0	-2
G	Vegan Party	5,463	0.59	New	0	New
K	Christian Democrats	5,328	0.58	+0.12	0	0
Æ	Freedom List	3,166	0.34	New	0	New
M	Danmark for Alle	2,434	0.27	New	0	New
J	Hampepartiet	1,801	0.20	-0.05	0	0
H	Lokalliste i Region Hovedstaden	1,597	0.17	+0.01	0	0
E	Valgfest med mexicansk tema	1,380	0.15	+0.03	0	0
Y	Kærlighedspartiet Regnbuefolket Be	1,216	0.13	New	0	New
W	Odins Vikingehær	1,154	0.13	New	0	New
R	Kommunistisk Parti	1,134	0.12	-0.10	0	0
P	Stram Kurs	1,021	0.11	+0.05	0	0
Q	Feministisk Initiativ	1,020	0.11	-0.27	0	0
N	Fjordlandslisten	998	0.11	New	0	New
L	Lavere skatter og afgifter	964	0.10	+0.02	0	0
T	Det Syge Hus	232	0.03	New	0	New
U	Copenhagen	176	0.02	New	0	New
Z	De LokalNationale	174	0.02	New	0	New
Total		915,003	100	N/A	41	N/A
Invalid votes		4,247	0.29	+0.04		
Blank votes		31,990	2.17	-0.17		
Turnout		951,240	64.44	-2.84		
Source: valg.dk
