= Michael Monberg =

Danish politician (born 1978)

Personal details
- Born: 17 May 1978 (age 48) Fredensborg Municipality, Denmark
- Party: Vegan Party

Michael Monberg (born 17 May 1978) is a Danish politician. He is the co-founder of the Vegan Party, founded in 2018, and had been the leader of the party since its foundation. On 6 August 2020, Monberg's party had managed to collect the signatures required to run for the next Danish general election, and on 14 September this was confirmed by the Minister of Social Affairs and the Interior. On 15 September, Monberg resigned as party leader. The new leader became Lisel Vad Olsson.

Political offices
| Preceded by None | Leader of the Vegan Party; 2018—2020 | Succeeded by Lisel Vad Olsson |
