= Vegan Party =

Vegan Party Veganerpartiet
- Leader: Lisel Vad Olsson
- Founded: October, 2018
- Dissolved: 20 September 2022
- Merged into: The Alternative
- Ideology: Veganism; Green politics Ecocentrism; Single-issue politics
- Colors: Green

Election symbol
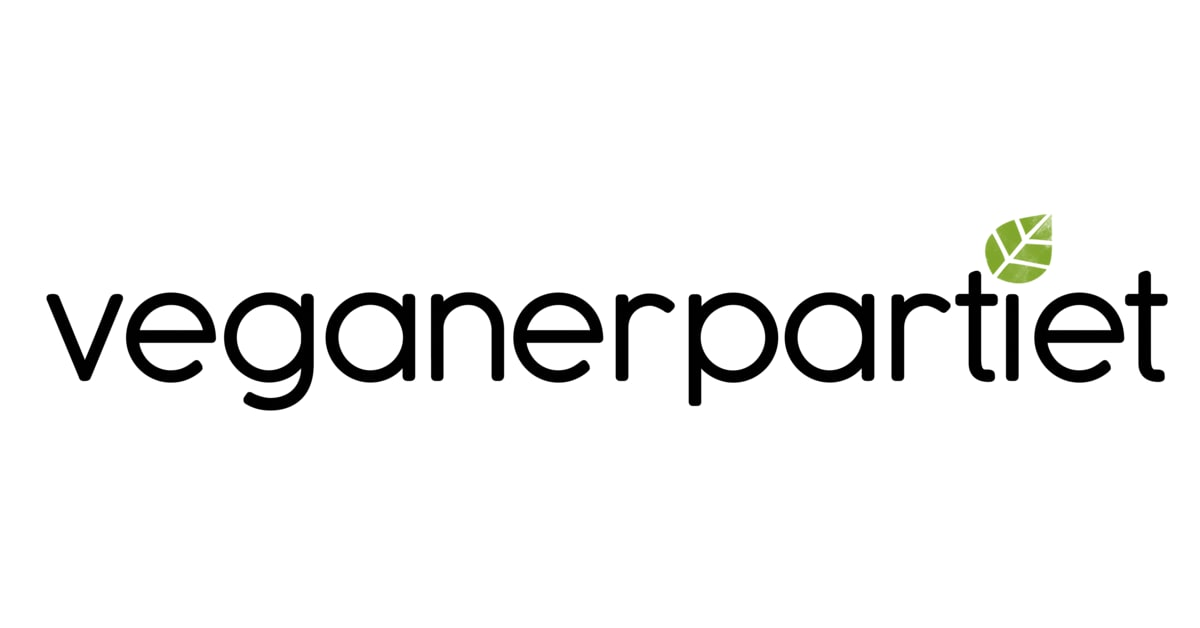
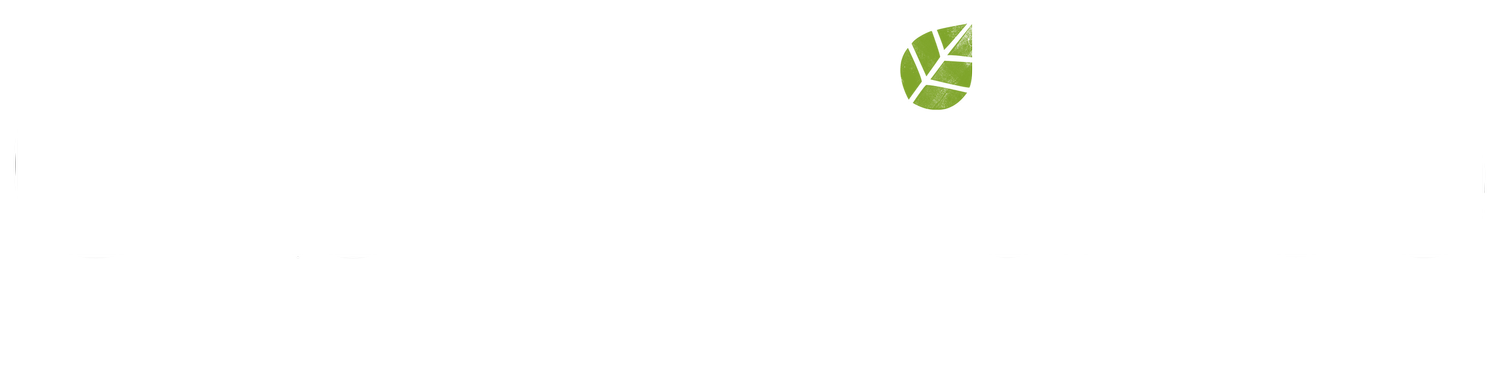
- G

The Vegan Party (Danish: Veganerpartiet) was a political party in Denmark.

== History ==
The party was founded in October 2018 by Henrik Vindfeldt and Michael Monberg. Monberg became the leader of the party. In August 2020 the party had gathered the required signatures to run in the next Danish general election, and on 14 September this was confirmed by the Minister of Social Affairs and the Interior. The following day, Monberg resigned as the party's leader, and Lisel Vad Olsson took over. Olsson was a certified practitioner in meditation and reiki. She led the party until March 2021.

The party was renamed Green Alliance on 1 September 2022 and on 20 September 2022 it merged into The Alternative.
