= Communist Party (Denmark) =

Communist Party Kommunistisk Parti
- Chairperson: Lotte Rørtoft-Madsen
- Founded: 2006
- Merger of: DKP/ML; Communist Unification
- Headquarters: Frederiksborgvej 11, 1st floor 2400 Copenhagen NV
- Newspaper: Dagbladet Arbejderen
- Ideology: Communism; Marxism-Leninism; Anti-revisionism
- Political position: Far-left

Website
- www.kommunister.dk

The Communist Party (Danish: Kommunistisk Parti, or KP) is a Marxist-Leninist political party in Denmark.

== History and profile ==
The party was formed in 2006 through the merger of Communist Party of Denmark (Marxist-Leninist) (DKP/ML) and Communist Unification (KS). The latter of which consisted of a group of breakaways from the KPiD, who chose to leave the party in 2005 in protest against the party's reluctance for a merger with DKP/ML.

The party was founded as part of an attempt to unite the communist forces in Denmark, which had been divided between the Communist Party of Denmark and various changing small factions and parties since the 1970s. Of these smaller parties, Fælles Kurs achieved representation in the Folketing, while DKP/ML's forerunner, the Communist Workers' Party (KAP), did not.

The party held its third congress in Copenhagen from 18 to 20 November 2011. Here it was decided to run in the local elections in 2013, form a youth organization and develop the party's daily newspaper Arbejderen. The local elections are the party's first participation in elections, previously the party has recommended voting on the Unity List or the People's Movement against the EU. With several candidates in Copenhagen, the party is listed as List R, this list was supported by the other communist parties DKP and KPiD. Together with the KPiD the party formed a unity list in Aarhus.

The party publishes Dagbladet Arbejderen (The Daily Worker), a daily newspaper, and distributes the Patrick Mac Manus prize, for political activism on behalf of revolutionary workers' movements.

== Popular support and electoral results ==
The KP has fielded candidates in local elections in Copenhagen, Aarhus, Aalborg and Hvidovre. The party has thus far not competed in elections for the Folketing or the European Parliament.

=== Municipalities ===
Copenhagen
Year	Votes	%
2009	481	0.2%
2013	1,163	0,4%
2017	1,219	0.4%
2021	1,235	0.4%

Aalborg
Year	Votes	%
2021	189	0.2%

Hvidovre
Year	Votes	%
2021	49	0.2%

Aarhus
Year	Votes	%	Misc.
2013	348	0.2%	Together with the KPiD
2017	275	0.1%	Together with the KPiD

=== Regions ===
Hovedstaden
Year	Votes	%
2021	1134	0.1%

== See also ==
- Communist Party in Denmark (KPiD)
- Communist Party of Denmark (DKP)
