= Communist Party in Denmark =

Communist Party in Denmark Kommunistisk Parti i Danmark
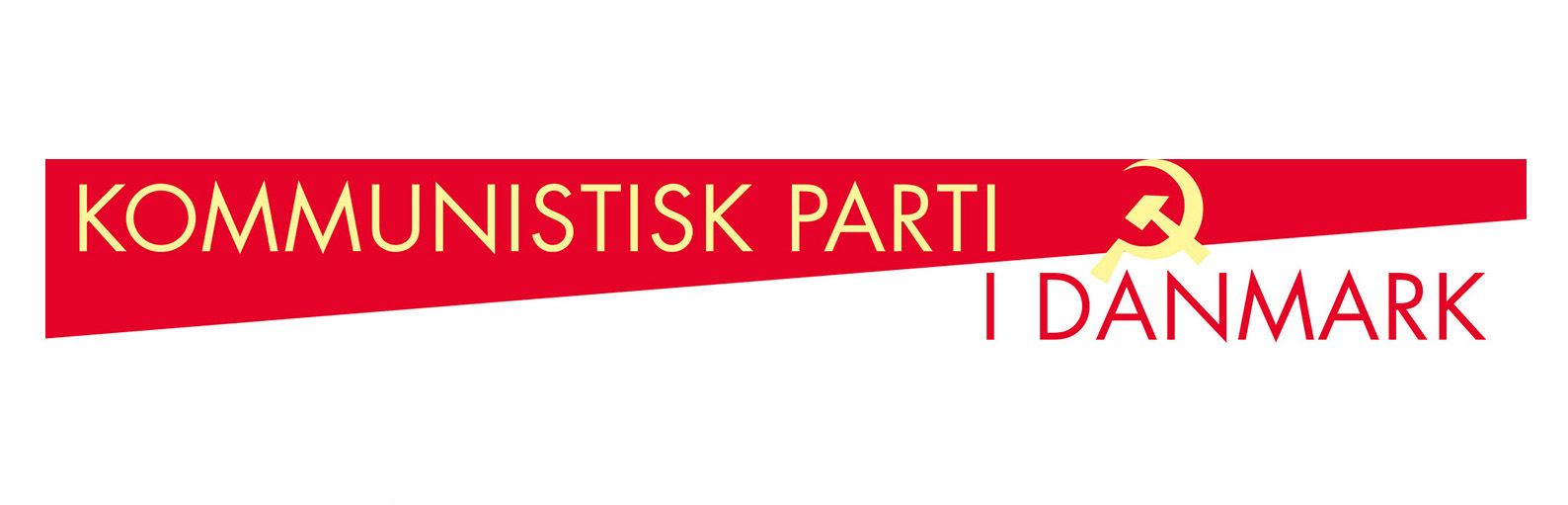
- Chairperson: Rikke G.F. Carlsson
- Founded: 1990
- Dissolved: 2023
- Split from: DKP
- Merged into: DKP
- Headquarters: Frederikssundsvej 82 2400 København NV
- Membership: 100
- Ideology: Communism; Marxism-Leninism
- Political position: Far-left
- European affiliation: INITIATIVE
- International affiliation: IMCWP; ICS(defunct)

Website
- http://www.kommunisterne.dk/

Communist Party in Denmark (Danish: Kommunistisk Parti i Danmark) was a Marxist-Leninist party in Denmark.

== History ==
At the Communist Party of Denmark (DKP) party congress in 1990, the party chose to break from its historical ties to the Soviet Union and the former communist regimes in Eastern Europe. The founders of the KPID did not believe there was any reason for such a break or a change in policy. They also could not accept that the DKP formed electoral alliances with the Left Socialists (VS) and the Socialist Workers' Party (SAP). In 1989 these three parties formed the Unity List (Enhedslisten). As a result, the founders of KPiD split from the DKP and organized themselves under the label 'Communist Forum,' but after three years, on 7 November 1993, they changed their name to the Communist Party in Denmark.

=== Unity talks with DKP and KP ===
The KPiD was one of four active communist parties in Denmark. In the last few decades, various attempts of the DKP, the KPiD and the KP to form a unified communist party have failed. The last attempt failed in 2019. The main differences between the parties are on a personal, cultural and historical level. However the three parties differ little ideologically. The fourth communist party, the Workers' Communist Party (APK) refused to participate in the talks.

These unity talks resumed after the Unity List adopted several resolutions in which the party accepted Denmark's membership of NATO and the EU, which is unacceptable to both the DKP and KPiD. The KPiD temporarily dropped its demand that the DKP would prohibit dual membership with Unity List, in order for the merger to go ahead. In September 2023, KPiD merged (described by both parties as a 'reunion') with DKP.

=== Leadership ===
Betty Frydensbjerg Carlsson was the party leader from the party's founding until the party congress in May 2015, where she chose to step down. Arne Cheller was elected as the new leader. After being unanimously reelected to the national leadership at the 12th congress in 2018. However, chairman Arne Cheller and other members of the national leadership resigned from the party only a few days earlier. The reason behind the resignation was a conflict on the unification process between the KPiD and two other communist parties. Cheller and the others then joined the Communist Party (KP). Rikke Frydensbjerg Carlsson was subsequently elected as the new leader of the party.

The party published the monthly newspaper Kommunist.

== See also ==
- Communist Party (KP)
- Communist Party of Denmark (DKP)
- Workers' Communist Party (APK)
