= Freedom List (Denmark) =

Freedom List Frihedslisten
- Leader: Flemming Blicher
- Founded: 2021
- Ideology: Liberalism; Civil libertarianism Regionalism; Humanism; Vaccine hesitancy
- Political position: Right-wing
- Colours: Orange and white

Election symbol
- Æ

Website
- frihedslisten.dk

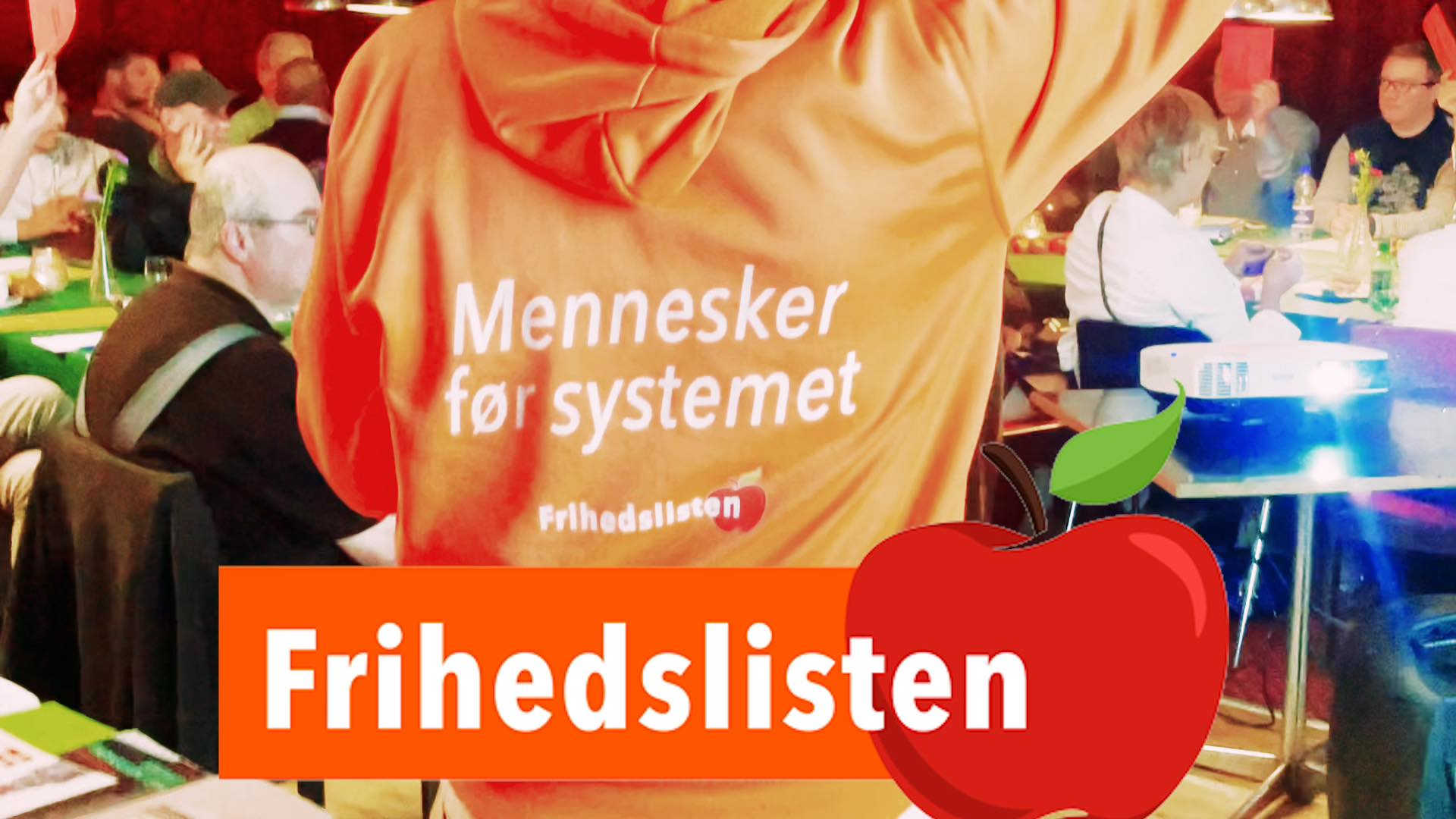

The Freedom List (Danish: Frihedslisten) is a Danish political group. A liberal party, it brands itself as promoting individual rights. It was founded during the COVID-19 pandemic in Denmark by prominent promoter of misinformation Flemming Blicher, and promotes refusal of government public health regulations, such as face masks and vaccines. The group was on the ballot in 26 municipalities and all 5 regions of Denmark in the 2021 Danish local elections, but won no seats.

== Background ==
The group was founded by Flemming Blicher, who had previously been behind several COVID-19 denialist demonstrations and demonstrations against the government's handling of the COVID-19 pandemic in Denmark.

The group describes itself as a collection of individuals, with localists and regionalist focuses, allowing the members of the group to express their own opinions regardless of what the rest of the group might think. The focus for several of the group's members are to fight the government's regulations regarding the COVID-19 pandemic in Denmark.

In the 2021 municipal election, several of the parties candidates in Copenhagen did not have a box next to their name to check off in order to vote for them. The party made official complaints in hopes of issuing a re-election but in avail.

== Election results ==
=== Local elections ===
Municipal elections

Election	Votes		Seats	
Election	%	±	#	±
2021	0.21	New		New

Regional elections

Date	Votes	Seats	
Date	Votes	#	±
2021			New

== See also ==
- Mink Commission
