= 2025 Sorø municipal election =

Municipal election in Denmark

| ← 2021 | 18 November 2025 | 2029 → |

All 25 seats to the Sorø municipal council 13 seats needed for a majority
- Turnout: 17,131 (70.0%) ▲3.2%
| | First party | Second party | Third party |
|---|---|---|---|
| | A | V | C |
| Party | Social Democrats | Venstre | Conservatives |
| Last election | 8 seats, 30.3% | 3 seats, 10.6% | 8 seats, 29.6% |
| Seats won | 7 | 7 | 2 |
| Seat change | ▼1 | ▲4 | ▼6 |
| Popular vote | 4,207 | 3,953 | 1,731 |
| Percentage | 25.0% | 23.5% | 10.3% |
| Swing | ▼5.3% | ▲12.9% | ▼19.3% |
| | Fourth party | Fifth party | Sixth party |
| | Ø | F | O |
| Party | Red-Green Alliance | Green Left | Danish People's Party |
| Last election | 1 seat, 4.6% | 2 seats, 9.8% | 1 seat, 4.6% |
| Seats won | 2 | 2 | 1 |
| Seat change | ▲1 | 0 | 0 |
| Popular vote | 1,511 | 1,410 | 933 |
| Percentage | 9.0% | 8.4% | 5.5% |
| Swing | ▲4.4% | ▼1.4% | ▲1.0% |
| | Seventh party | Eighth party | Ninth party |
| | I | Æ | B |
| Party | Liberal Alliance | Denmark Democrats | Social Liberals |
| Last election | 0 seats, 1.0% | Did not stand | 1 seat, 3.0% |
| Seats won | 1 | 1 | 1 |
| Seat change | ▲1 | ▲1 | 0 |
| Popular vote | 741 | 671 | 606 |
| Percentage | 4.4% | 4.0% | 3.6% |
| Swing | ▲3.4% | New | ▲0.7% |
Mayor before election
Gert Jørgensen
Conservatives
Mayor after election
Jakob Spliid
Venstre

The 2025 Sorø Municipal election was held on November 18, 2025, to elect the 25 members to sit in the regional council for the Sorø Municipal council, in the period of 2026 to 2029. Jakob Spliid from Venstre, would win the mayoral position.

== Background ==
Following the 2021 election, Gert Jørgensen from Conservatives became mayor for his third term. However, Jørgensen, would not run for a fourth term, and the Conservatives mayoral canddiate, will instead be Lars Schmidt.

== Electoral system ==
For elections to Danish municipalities, a number varying from 9 to 31 are chosen to be elected to the municipal council. The seats are then allocated using the D'Hondt method and a closed list proportional representation. Sorø Municipality had 25 seats in 2025.

== Electoral alliances ==
=== Electoral Alliance 1 ===
| Party | | Political alignment |
|---|---|---|
| A | Social Democrats | Centre-left |
| F | Green Left | Centre-left to Left-wing |
| Ø | Red-Green Alliance | Left-wing to Far-Left |

=== Electoral Alliance 2 ===
| Party | | Political alignment |
|---|---|---|
| B | Social Liberals | Centre to Centre-left |
| M | Moderates | Centre to Centre-right |

=== Electoral Alliance 3 ===
| Party | | Political alignment |
|---|---|---|
| C | Conservatives | Centre-right |
| Æ | Denmark Democrats | Right-wing to Far-right |

=== Electoral Alliance 4 ===
| Party | | Political alignment |
|---|---|---|
| D | New Right | Far-right |
| I | Liberal Alliance | Centre-right to Right-wing |
| O | Danish People's Party | Right-wing to Far-right |
| V | Venstre | Centre-right |

== Results by polling station ==
| Division | A | B | C | D | F | I | L | M | O | V | Æ | Ø |
| Division | % | % | % | % | % | % | % | % | % | % | % | % |
|---|---|---|---|---|---|---|---|---|---|---|---|---|
| Dianalund | 27.8 | 1.3 | 11.5 | 3.8 | 6.6 | 4.3 | 0.2 | 3.5 | 8.6 | 22.7 | 5.3 | 4.6 |
| Ruds Vedby | 20.1 | 0.7 | 27.1 | 2.1 | 4.9 | 4.6 | 0.5 | 2.0 | 10.8 | 12.2 | 5.6 | 9.3 |
| Alsted Fjenneslev | 19.6 | 1.8 | 6.0 | 4.6 | 8.1 | 3.7 | 0.0 | 3.9 | 6.2 | 29.2 | 9.0 | 7.9 |
| Sorø Borgerskole | 27.6 | 6.6 | 10.7 | 2.0 | 9.6 | 4.8 | 0.0 | 2.6 | 2.7 | 21.1 | 1.8 | 10.5 |
| Frederiksberg Skole | 23.7 | 5.8 | 5.3 | 2.2 | 11.0 | 3.2 | 0.1 | 1.8 | 2.1 | 26.7 | 2.0 | 16.2 |
| Pedersborg | 25.9 | 3.4 | 7.8 | 3.0 | 6.9 | 6.0 | 0.2 | 4.0 | 5.0 | 28.5 | 3.7 | 5.7 |
| Stenlille | 23.4 | 1.8 | 13.0 | 5.7 | 8.3 | 4.4 | 0.3 | 2.6 | 8.4 | 20.5 | 5.5 | 6.1 |

== Results ==
| Party | | Votes | % | +/- | Seats | +/- |
Sorø Municipality
| A | Social Democrats | 4,207 | 25.02 | -5.29 | 7 | -1 |
| V | Venstre | 3,953 | 23.51 | +12.90 | 7 | +4 |
| C | Conservatives | 1,731 | 10.29 | -19.28 | 2 | -6 |
| Ø | Red-Green Alliance | 1,511 | 8.98 | +4.38 | 2 | +1 |
| F | Green Left | 1,410 | 8.38 | -1.45 | 2 | 0 |
| O | Danish People's Party | 933 | 5.55 | +0.97 | 1 | 0 |
| I | Liberal Alliance | 741 | 4.41 | +3.39 | 1 | +1 |
| Æ | Denmark Democrats | 671 | 3.99 | New | 1 | New |
| B | Social Liberals | 606 | 3.60 | +0.65 | 1 | 0 |
| D | New Right | 550 | 3.27 | -1.87 | 1 | 0 |
| M | Moderates | 478 | 2.84 | New | 0 | New |
| L | Alle Mennesker Er Værdifulde | 26 | 0.15 | New | 0 | New |
| Total | | 16,817 | 100 | N/A | 25 | N/A |
| Invalid votes | | 52 | 0.21 | -0.15 | | |
| Blank votes | | 262 | 1.07 | +0.09 | | |
| Turnout | | 17,131 | 69.96 | +3.23 | | |
Source: valg.dk

== Opinion polls ==
| Polling firm | Fieldwork date | Sample size | A | C | V | F | D | Ø | O | B | I | L | M | Æ | Others | Lead |
|---|---|---|---|---|---|---|---|---|---|---|---|---|---|---|---|---|
| Epinion | 4 Sep - 13 Oct 2025 | 490 | 29.6 | 8.8 | 13.3 | 13.7 | – | 8.6 | 6.7 | 2.4 | 5.2 | – | 2.8 | 6.6 | 2.2 | 15.9 |
| 2024 european parliament election | 9 Jun 2024 | | 16.5 | 8.5 | 14.3 | 19.0 | – | 5.2 | 8.3 | 5.6 | 5.9 | – | 6.0 | 8.6 | – | 2.5 |
| 2022 general election | 1 Nov 2022 | | 29.6 | 5.2 | 11.8 | 10.2 | 4.8 | 3.4 | 3.7 | 2.7 | 6.0 | – | 10.4 | 8.7 | – | 17.8 |
| 2021 regional election | 16 Nov 2021 | | 35.6 | 16.8 | 16.2 | 7.5 | 5.7 | 5.4 | 5.3 | 4.0 | 1.4 | – | – | – | – | 18.8 |
| 2021 municipal election | 16 Nov 2021 | | 30.3 (8) | 29.6 (8) | 10.6 (3) | 9.8 (2) | 5.1 (1) | 4.6 (1) | 4.6 (1) | 3.0 (1) | 1.0 (0) | – | – | – | – | 0.7 |
