= 2021 Sorø municipal election =

← 2017	16 November 2021	2025 →

All 21 seats to the Sorø Municipal Council 11 seats needed for a majority
- Turnout: 15,857 (66.7%) ▼5.6pp
	First party	Second party	Third party
	A	C	V
Party	Social Democrats	Conservatives	Venstre
Last election	8 seats, 29.9%	7 seats, 24.7%	3 seats, 9.8%
Seats won	8	8	3
Seat change	0	▲1	0
Popular vote	4,704	4,591	1,647
Percentage	30.3%	29.6%	10.6%
Swing	▲0.4%	▲4.9%	▲0.8%
	Fourth party	Fifth party	Sixth party
	F	D	Ø
Party	Green Left	New Right	Red–Green Alliance
Last election	1 seat, 5.1%	0 seats, 2.4%	1 seat, 4.6%
Seats won	2	1	1
Seat change	▲1	▲1	0
Popular vote	1,526	798	715
Percentage	9.8%	5.1%	4.6%
Swing	▲4.7%	▲2.7%	0.0%
	Seventh party	Eighth party
	O	B
Party	Danish People's Party	Social Liberals
Last election	3 seats, 11.2%	1 seat, 2.9%
Seats won	1	1
Seat change	▼2	0
Popular vote	710	458
Percentage	4.6%	3.0%
Swing	▼6.6%	▲0.1%
Mayor before election
Gert Jørgensen
Conservatives
Mayor after election
Gert Jørgensen
Conservatives

Following the 2013 election, Gert Jørgensen from the Conservatives had become mayor of Sorø Municipality. In 2017 he would win re-election, despite the party failing to become the largest.

In the election, the Conservatives would gain a seat, becoming just as large as the Social Democrats. Following the election results, Anne Madsen from the Social Democrats looked set to take the mayor's position away from the Conservatives, as an agreement was reached between the Social Democrats, the Green Left, Danish People's Party and the Red–Green Alliance. However some timer later, dramatically Lars Schmidt from Danish People's Party decided to switch party affiliation to Conservatives, and Gert Jørgensen would now have majority behind him.

== Electoral system ==
For elections to Danish municipalities, a number varying from 9 to 31 are chosen to be elected to the municipal council. The seats are then allocated using the D'Hondt method and a closed list proportional representation. Sorø Municipality had 21 seats in 2021

Unlike in Danish General Elections, in elections to municipal councils, electoral alliances are allowed.

== Electoral alliances ==
=== Electoral Alliance 1 ===
Party		Political alignment
C	Conservatives	Centre-right
D	New Right	Right-wing to Far-right
O	Danish People's Party	Right-wing to Far-right
V	Venstre	Centre-right

=== Electoral Alliance 2 ===
Party		Political alignment
B	Social Liberals	Centre to Centre-left
I	Liberal Alliance	Centre-right to Right-wing
K	Christian Democrats	Centre to Centre-right

=== Electoral Alliance 3 ===
Party		Political alignment
A	Social Democrats	Centre-left
F	Green Left	Centre-left to Left-wing
Ø	Red–Green Alliance	Left-wing to Far-Left

== Results by polling station ==
Q = Frigængerne

Division	A	B	C	D	F	I	K	O	Q	V	Æ	Ø
Division	%	%	%	%	%	%	%	%	%	%	%	%
Dianalund	32.0	1.9	31.5	6.1	6.0	1.1	0.8	7.3	0.2	9.4	0.4	3.3
Ruds Vedby	30.0	1.1	40.2	6.4	4.5	0.8	1.2	6.2	0.2	3.8	0.8	4.9
Alsted Fjenneslev	26.7	2.0	26.6	8.1	7.4	1.2	0.1	4.7	1.1	16.6	0.7	4.7
Sorø	30.8	4.6	31.5	2.4	12.3	1.0	0.2	3.0	0.7	8.1	0.3	5.1
Stenlille	27.9	1.9	28.8	8.3	8.4	1.3	0.3	6.2	0.3	12.1	0.7	3.8
Pedersborg	32.4	2.5	29.1	5.2	7.4	0.9	0.1	4.1	0.4	14.2	0.3	3.4
Frederiksberg	30.0	4.4	24.6	2.9	16.2	0.9	0.2	2.1	1.2	10.6	0.3	6.7

== Results ==
Party		Votes	%	+/-	Seats	+/-
Sorø Municipality
A	Social Democrats	4,704	30.30	+0.41	8	0
C	Conservatives	4,591	29.57	+4.91	8	+1
V	Venstre	1,647	10.61	+0.80	3	0
F	Green Left	1,526	9.83	+4.76	2	+1
D	New Right	798	5.14	+2.75	1	+1
Ø	Red-Green Alliance	715	4.61	+0.04	1	0
O	Danish People's Party	710	4.57	-6.66	1	-2
B	Social Liberals	458	2.95	+0.07	1	0
I	Liberal Alliance	158	1.02	-1.12	0	0
Q	Frigængerne	89	0.57	New	0	New
Æ	Freedom List	69	0.44	New	0	New
K	Christian Democrats	59	0.38	+0.13	0	0
Total		15,524	100	N/A	25	N/A
Invalid votes		85	0.36	+0.27		
Blank votes		248	1.04	+0.04		
Turnout		15,857	66.73	-5.52		
Source: valg.dk
