= Gamst =

Gamst is a surname. Notable people with the name include:

- Andreas Bernhard Gamst (1923–2015), Norwegian politician
- Henrik Gamst (1788–1861), Danish industrialist, politician and landowner
- Morten Gamst Pedersen (born 1981), Norwegian footballer
- Pål Waaktaar Gamst (born 1961), Norwegian musician and songwriter
- Gamst (YouTuber), South Korean YouTuber

== See also ==
- H. Gamst & H. C. Lund
