= Peder Madsen =

- Bishop of Zealand
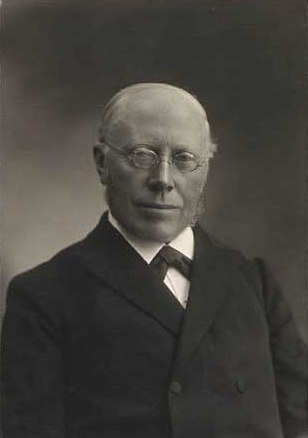
- Church: Church of Denmark
- In office: 1909–1911
- Predecessor: Thomas Skat Rørdam
- Successor: Harald Ostenfeld

Personal details
- Born: 28 August 1843 Herning Municipality, Denmark
- Died: 7 August 1911 (aged 67) Vedbygård, Denmark
- Buried: Ruds Vedby
- Denomination: Lutheranism
- Education: University of Copenhagen; Cand.theol., 1868; Doctor of theology, 1879

Peder Madsen (28 August 1843 – 7 August 1911) was a Danish theologian and Bishop of the Diocese of Zealand from 1909 until his death in 1911. Prior to being ordained as a bishop, he had been a professor and the rector of the University of Copenhagen.

He was appointed a Commander, 1st Class, of the Order of the Dannebrog and was later awarded the Dannebrogordenens Hæderstegn.

== Early life and education ==
Madsen was born on 28 August 1843 to Mads Jensen and Mette Kirstine Pedersdatter. His father, Mads Jensen, oversaw a farm near Holstebro and worked as a sognefoged: an appointed aid to the rural chief of police. During his childhood, Madsen was taught by a neighboring priest until attending a secondary school in Viborg from 1858 until 1862. In January 1868 he received a cand.theol. degree from the University of Copenhagen.

== Career ==
In 1872 he traveled abroad to Italy, Switzerland, France, and Germany. In particular, he studied theology at the University of Erlangen–Nuremberg, which had a lasting impact on him. He had intended to continue his travels to England, but was called back to the University of Copenhagen to fill the professorial vacancy left by Henrik Nicolai Clausen in 1874. That autumn he began giving lectures on dogmatic theology and the exegesis of the New Testament. In 1875 he was appointed as a fully-fledged professor of theology. He later served as the university's rector in 1889–1890 and 1903–1904.

In 1879, Madsen received his doctorate in theology with the completion of his dissertation on Christian spiritual priesthood: De kristnes aandelige Præstedømme. He went on to publish several other works, including: Det kirkelige Embede, en dogmatisk Undersøgelse (1890), Embedet og Menighedens Samvirken i det kirkelige Arbejde (1894), Bornholmerne eller den saakaldte lutherske Missionsforening (1886), and Om det foreslaaede Tillæg til vor Gudstjeneste (1887).

In addition to his work teaching theology, Madsen had an active influence on the work of the church in Denmark. From 1879 to 1881, he was involved in the preparation of a new series of pericopes and later, when the church council was established, his fellow theological faculty elected him as their representative from 1884 until 1886. He served as a member of the committee for the Danish Lutheran mission in Amerika in 1880–1894, and was appointed as a member of the board of Indre Mission in 1880.

Madsen was appointed the bishop of Zealand in 1909, a position which he held for only two years before his death in 1911.

== Personal life ==
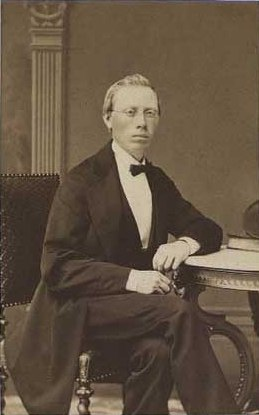
Peder Madsen photographed by Georg Emil Hansen

On 16 September 1881 he married Charlotte Storck (1842–1917), the daughter of a priest from Lejre Municipality. In 1892, she inherited an estate in Holbæk municipality, Vedbygård. At the time, the estate then became her husband's property, though she regained ownership after his death on 7 August 1911. Madsen is buried at the church cemetery in Ruds Vedby.
