= List of burials at Vestre Cemetery =

This list of burials at Vestre Cemetery lists notable burials at Vestre Cemetery in Copenhagen, Denmark.

== List ==
Interment	Lived	Profession	Ref
Carl Aller	1845–1926	publisher, founder of Aller Media	Ref
Hans Niels Andersen	1852–1937	businessman, founder of East Asiatic Company	Ref
Herman Bang	1857–1912	writer	Ref
Anna Bloch	1868–1953	actress	Ref
Vilhelm Buhl	1881–1954	political leader, Social Democrat Prime Minister of Denmark	Ref
Anne Marie Carl-Nielsen	1863–1945	sculptor	Ref
Alf Cock-Clausen	1886–1983	architect	Ref
Tove Ditlevsen	1917–1976	writer	Ref
Emmy Drachmann	1854–1928	writer	
Edvard Eriksen	1876–1959	sculptor, most famous for the statue of the Little Mermaid	Ref
Ludvig Fenger	1833–1905	architect	Ref
Achton Friis	1871–1939	painter and writer	Ref
Vilhelm Hammershøi	1864–1916	painter	Ref
Fritz Hansen	1906–1960	furnituremaker, founder of Fritz Hansen	Ref
Hans Christian Hansen	1906–1960	political leader, Social Democrat Prime Minister	Ref
Hans Hedtoft	1903–1955	political leader, Social Democrat	Ref
Per Hækkerup	1915–1979	political leader, Social Democrat	Ref
Robert Jacobsen	1912–1993	sculptor	Ref
Arthur Jensen	actor	1897–1981	Ref
Jacob Jensen	1926–2015	designer	Ref
August Jerndorff	1846–1906	painter	Ref
Thad Jones	1923–1986	jazz trumpeter	Ref
Hack Kampmann	1856–1920	architect	Ref
Viggo Kampmann	1910–1975	political leader, Social Democrat Prime Minister	Ref
Poul Kjærgaard	1912–1999	architect	Ref
Jens Otto Krag	1914–1978	political leader, Social Democrat Prime Minister	Ref
Otto Mønsted	1838–1916	businessman	Ref
Asta Nielsen	1881–1972	film actress	Ref
Carl Nielsen	1865–1931	composer	Tef
Kai Nielsen	1882–1924	sculptor	Ref
Julius Petersen	1839–1910	mathematician	Ref
Vilhelm Petersen	1839–1913	architect	Ref
Louis Pio	1941–1894	politician	Ref
Knud Rasmussen	1879–1933	polar explorer and anthropologist	Ref
Carl Rohl-Smith	1848–1900	Danish-American sculptor	Ref
Thomas Skat Rørdam	1832–1909	Bishop of Zealand	Ref
Jóhann Sigurjónsson	1880–1919	playwright	Ref
Thorvald Stauning	1873–1942	political leader, first Social Democrat Prime Minister	Ref
Karl Kristian Steincke	1880–1963	politician	Ref
Hermann Baagøe Storck	1839–1922	architect and heraldic artist	Ref
Hjalmar Söderberg	1869–1941	Swedish author	Ref
Ed Thigpen	1930–2010	jazz drummer	Ref
Laurits Tuxen	1853–1927	sculptor, painter	Ref
Einar Utzon-Frank	1888–1955	sculptor	Ref
Liva Weel	1897–1952	singer, actress	Ref
Carlo Wieth	1885–1943	actor	Ref
Natalie Zahle	1827–1913	educator	Ref
Kristian Zahrtmann	1843–1917	painter	Ref
