= Barner (noble family) =

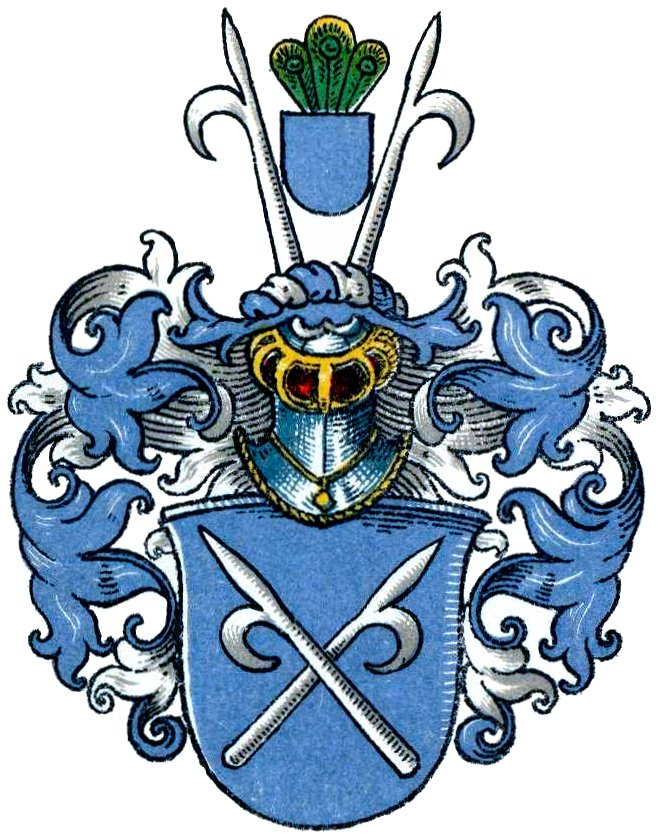
Coat of arms of Barner family

The Barner family is an originally German noble family of ancient nobility originating in Mecklenburg. A branch established in Denmark at the entrance to the 18th century.

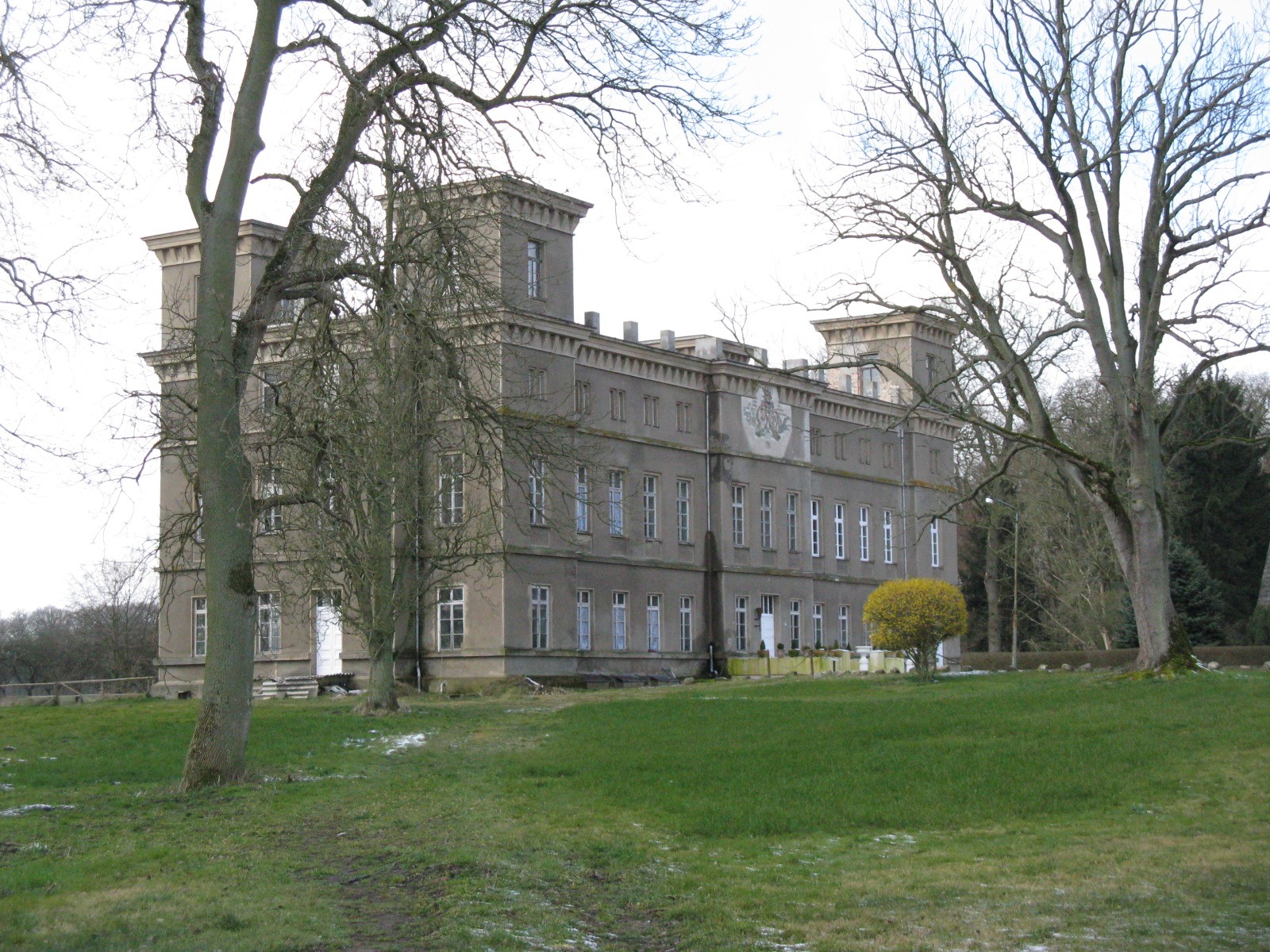
Schloss Bülow

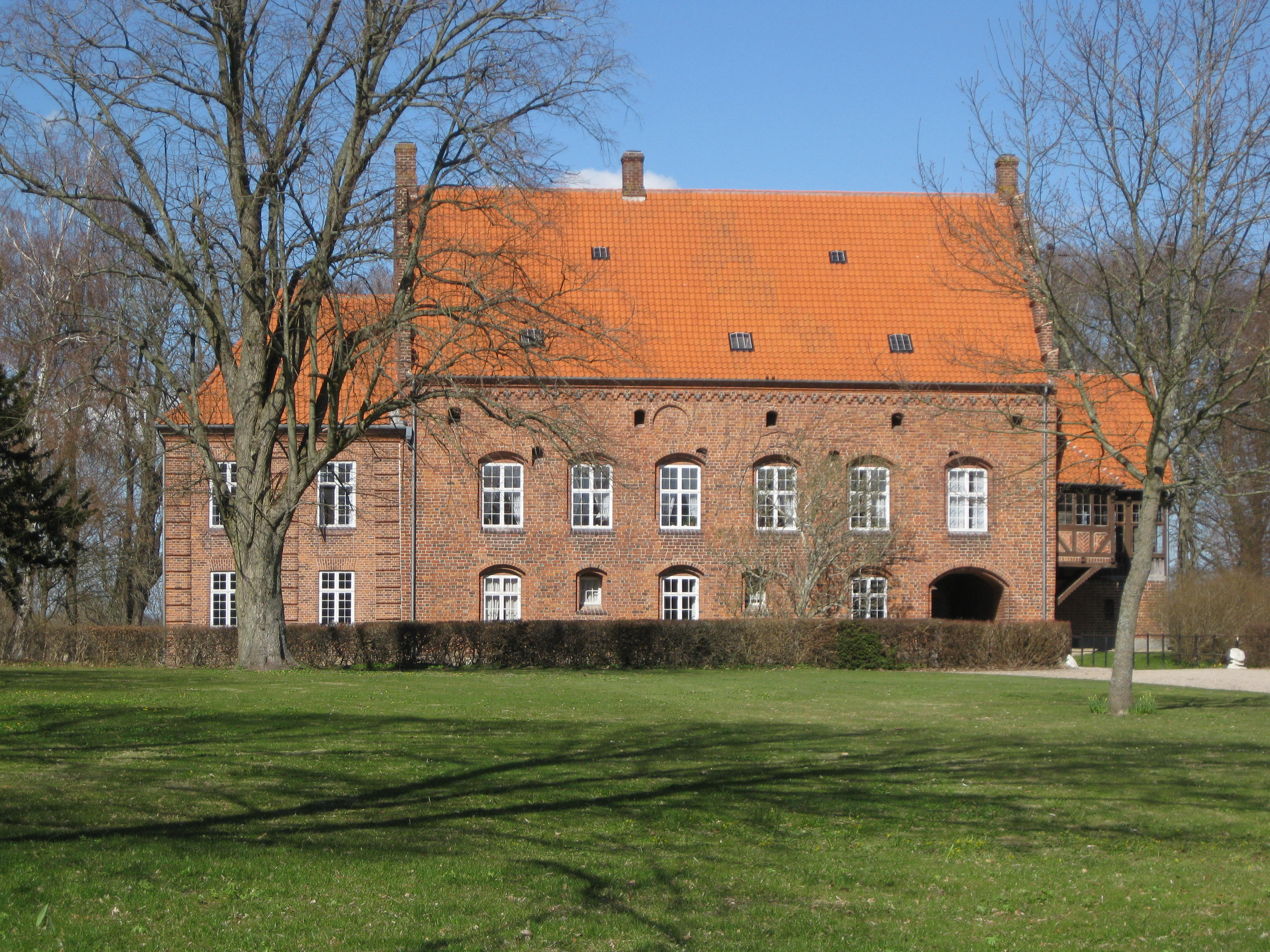
Vedbygård in Denmark

== Possessions ==
=== Germany ===
- Bülow seit 1590
- Badegow seit 1678/82
- Ganzkow
- Klein Görnow seit vor 1628
- Kressin pfandweise 1784-1788
- Kucksdorf, teilweise pfandweise 1696-ca. 1770
- Moltow seit 1754
- Sülten vor 1512-1760
- Trams seit 1754
- Groß und Klein Trebbow seit 1754
- Rützenfelde (Pommern) um die Mitte des 18. Jahrhunderts
