= Vedbygård =

Manor house in Sorø Municipality, Denmark

Vedbygaard
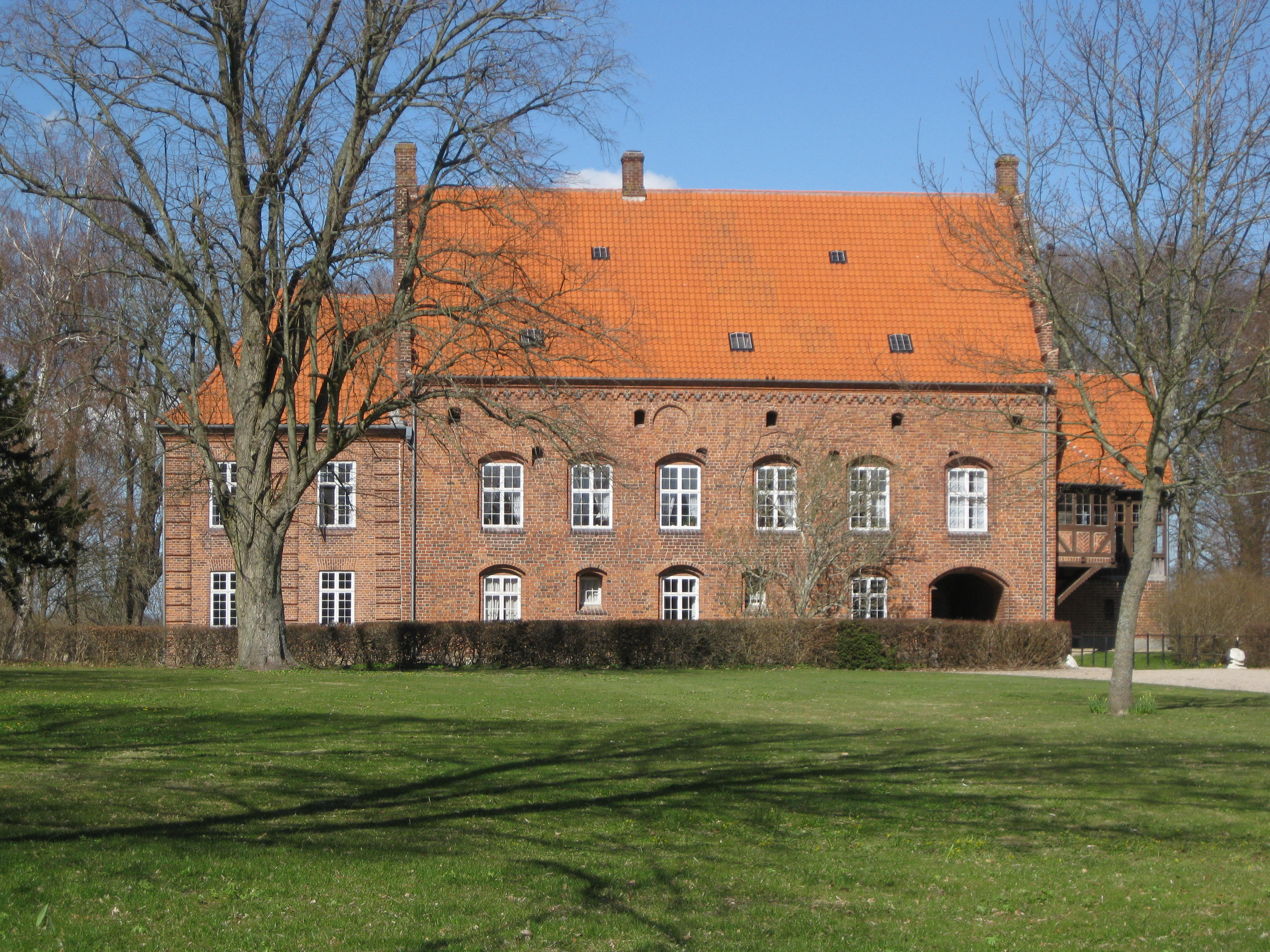
- Vedbygård viewed from the south
- Interactive map of the Vedbygaard area

General information
- Architectural style: Late Gothic
- Location: Ruds Vedby, Sorø Municipality, Denmark
- Coordinates: 55°32′38.70″N 11°22′29.20″E
- Completed: 1766 (main wing)
- Owner: Diakonissestiftelsen

Vedbygård is a former manor house located within the village of Ruds Vedby, 7 kilometres (4.3 mi) north-east of Høng, Sorø Municipality, Denmark. The oldest parts of the house date from the 15th century and are in the Late Gothic style.

== History ==
=== Early history ===
The first known reference to Vedbygård is from the early 14th century. Early owners include Queen Margaret I of Denmark, and after a period of private ownership it once again came under the Crown in 1369.

=== The Ruds of Ruds Vedby ===
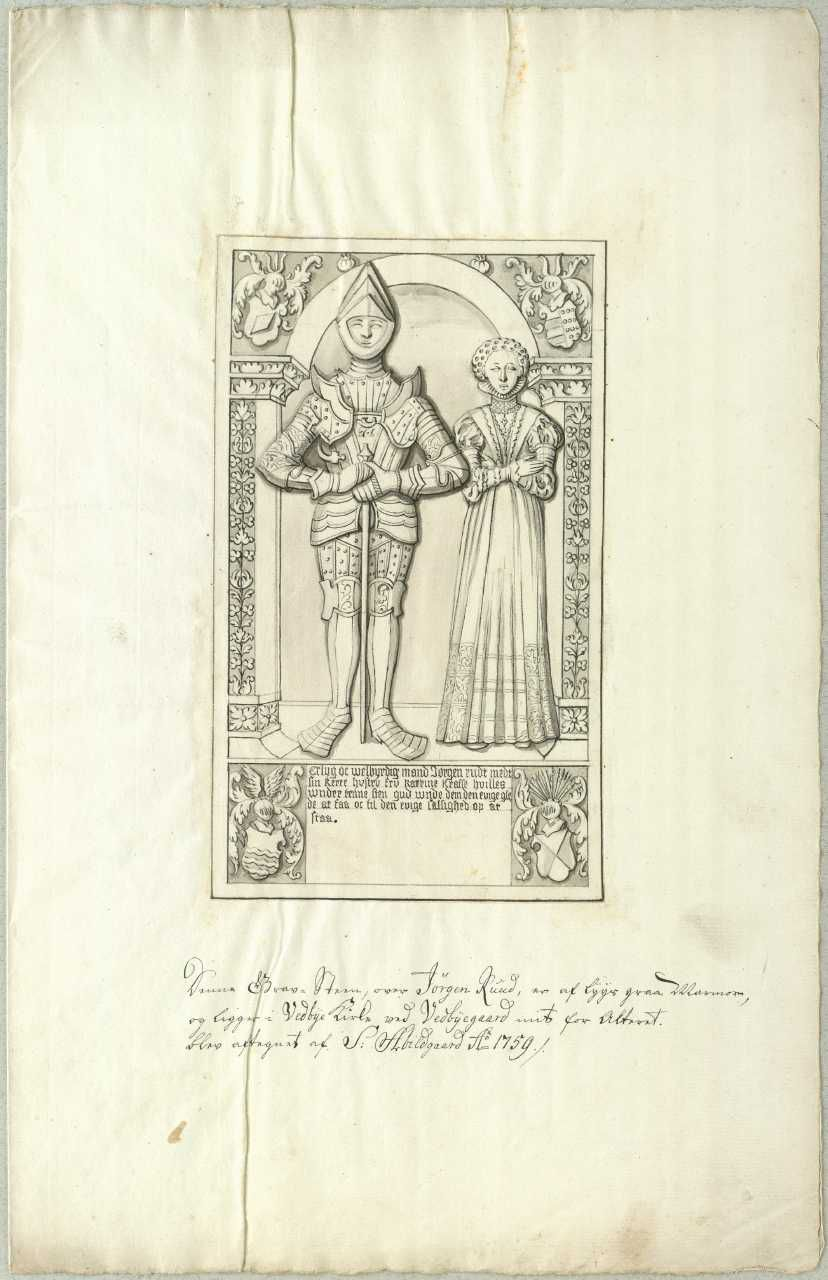
Drawing by S. Abildgaard of ledgerstone to Jørgen Rud and Karen Krafse in Vedby Church, 1759

In 1429, Jørgen Mikkelsen Rud acquired Vedbygård from the king in exchange for Skjoldenæsholm. He died the same year, leaving the estate to his son, Mikkel Jørgensen Rud, who was knighted by King Christopher, probably in connection with his coronation at Ribe in 1443, and served as his vassal (lensmand) at Kalundborg from 1453–1460, possibly also at Korsør 1458–1462. The main building was severely damaged during the Count's Feud but was rebuilt in 1540. Vedbygård was owned by the Rud family until 1671.

=== The von Barner family ===
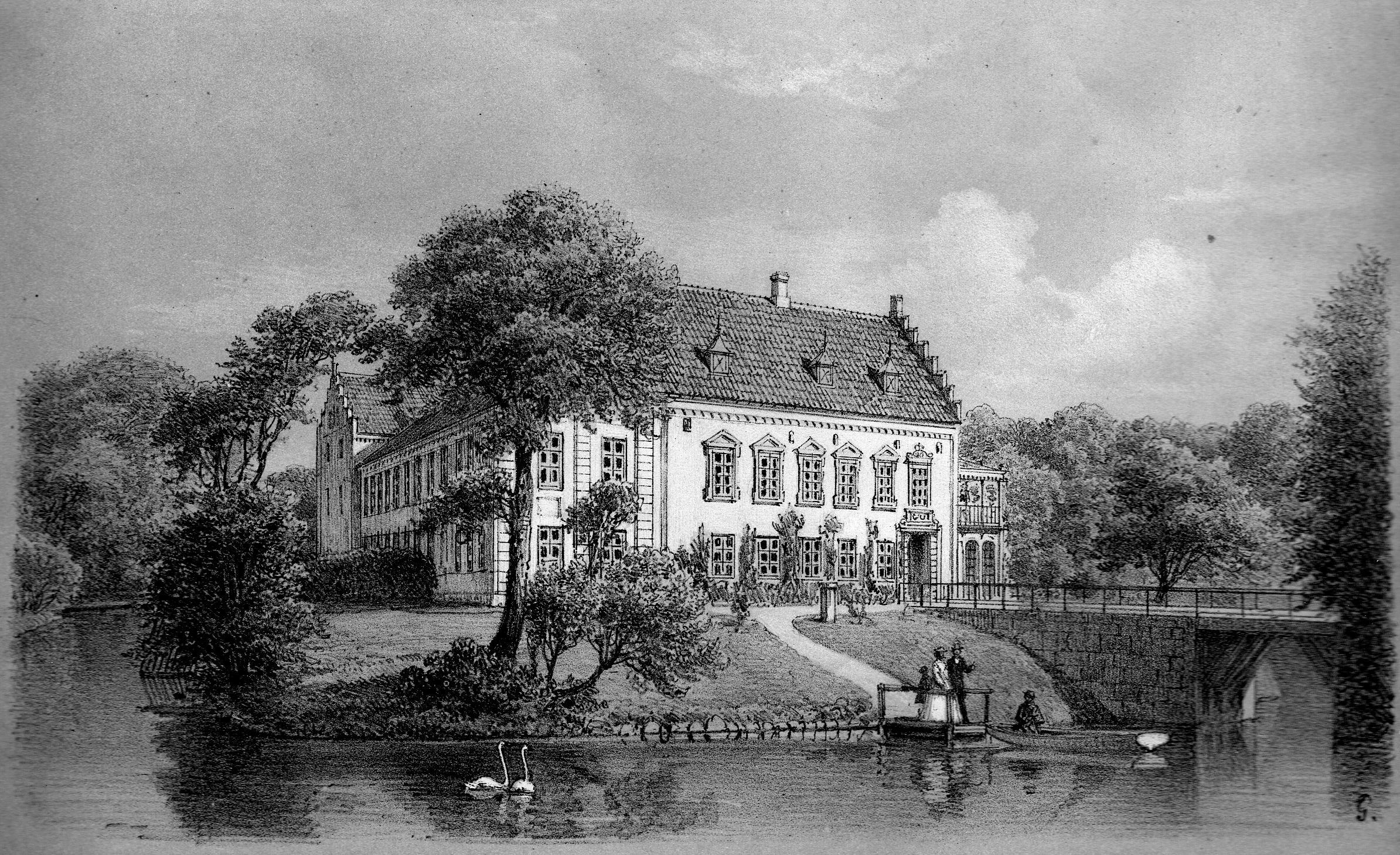
Vedbygård seen from the south-west in 1867

In 1700, Vedbygård came on the hands of the von Barner family when the owner, Lene Grubbe, married Friederich August von Barner who had emigrated to Denmark from Germany. In 1738, after the death of her second husband, Lene Grubbe sold Vedbygård to her nephew Joachim Hartwig Johann von Barner whom she owed money. Born in Mecklenburg, he had come to Denmark as a young man and been promoted through the ranks in the Royal Danish Army. In 1746, he became prefect (Stiftamtmand) over Christiansand in Norway, and in 1751 prefect (Amtmand) over Kalundborg, Dragsholm Castle, Sæbygård and Holbæk in Denmark.

Having no children, he founded a stamhus, a legal institution which succession rights for other lines of the Lerche family to the property. The Danish branch of the family, which descended from the next owner, Helmuth Gotthardt von Barner, was naturalized as Danish nobility on 3 July 1872. Members of the von Barner family owned Vedbygård until 1818 when Stamhuset Barnerborg was dissolved.

=== Later history ===
In 1892, Charlotte Storck, the adopted daughter of the former owner, Hans Christian Lund, inherited Vedbygård. She married Peder Madsen, Bishop of Zealand. They bequested their property to Diakonissestiftelsen in Copenhagen, providing that it be converted into a recovery home. It opened in 1917.

== Architecture ==
Vedbygård is a three-winged complex, still surrounded by moats and retaining much of the character of the Rud family's fortified manor house, in spite of numerous alterations and expansions over the centuries. The north and south wings are in the Late Gothic style, with crow-stepped gables, and date from their reconstruction of the house in the years after the Count's Feud. Both wings have attics with embrasure.

The oldest part, the short south wing, integrates surviving elements of the older building which date back to the second half of the 15th century. A comprehensive restoration carried out between 1896 and 1901 by F.C.C. Hansen and Hans Jørgen Holm recreated two of the original windows and a pointed-arched doorway. Two shallow-arched blindings in the outer wall of the upper floor were no doubt doorways opening to a now gone gallery. Larger windows and the arched gateway through the wing's ground floor were introduced in 1751. A small romantic pavilion with exposed timber framing, projecting from the east gable, is an addition from 1898 by Hans Jørgen Holm.

The north wing is slightly younger and has decorative blindings and irregularly placed, original windows. Its interior contains lime murals and frescos of scenes from the Old Testament, dating from the 16th century.

The somewhat lower west wing was built in the 1750s, replacing a defensive wall and a tower, although only the south gable remain from that day, featuring the original windows and pilasters, in ashlar, and the cornice typical of their time. The rest dates from a reconstruction in 1850 and the renovation later in the century.

== Ruds Vedby Church ==
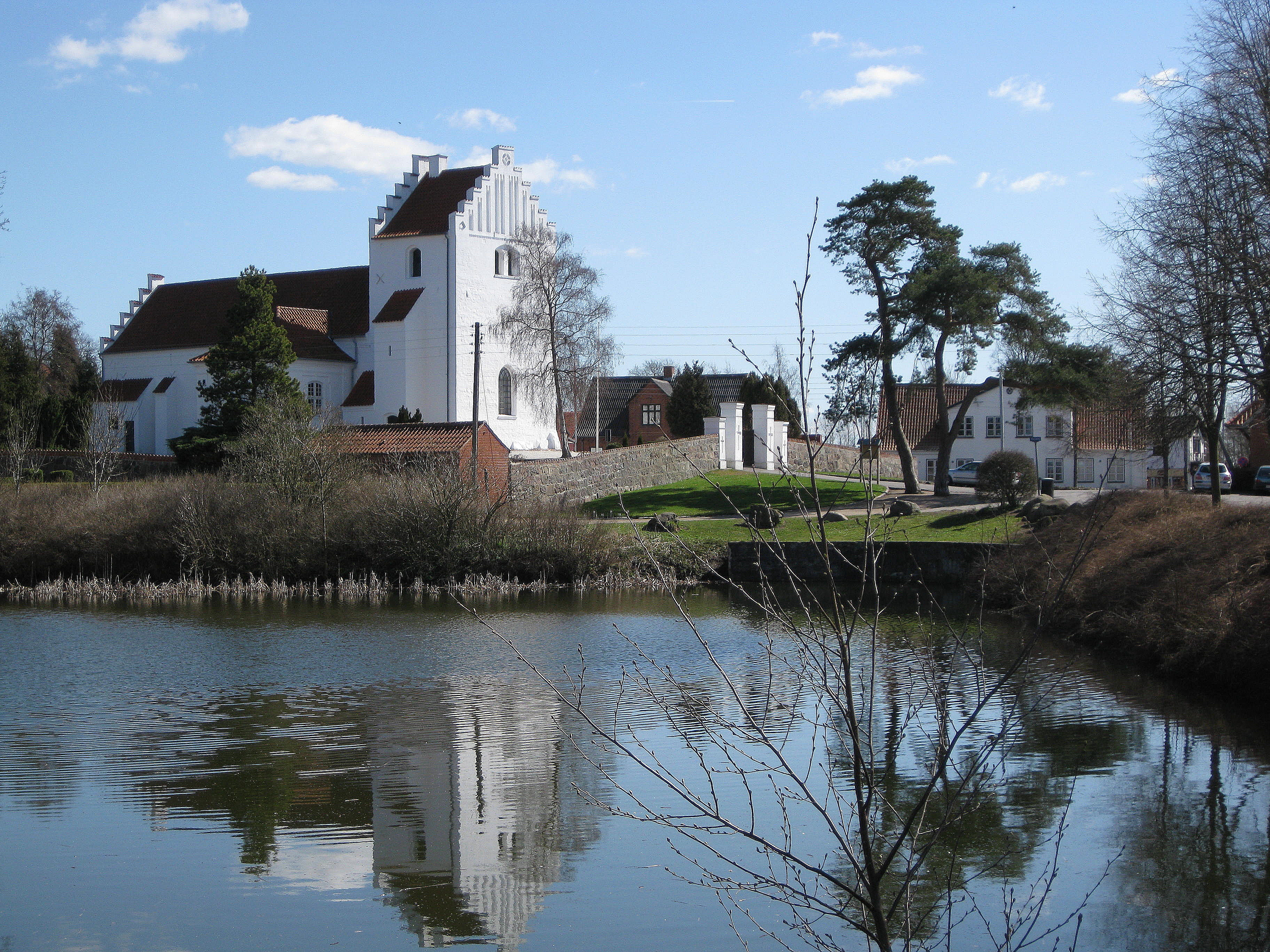
Ruds Vedby Church viewed from the south

Ruds Vedby Church belonged to the property until 1966. Originally a Roman Catholic church, it was first built in the 12th century in the Romanesque architecture style although little remains from that day. The choir was completed during Gothic times, the nave was extended to the east, a tower was built to the west, porches were added both on the north and south sides, and a barrel vaulted sacristy was built at the east gable.

The tower features the Rud coat of arms. In 1769, a Rococo-style funeral chapel for the Barner family was built on the north side in 1768. Their tombs have later been transferred to a crypt beneath the chapel.

== Today ==
The estate became the site of a convalescent home from 1917 and affiliated with the Deaconess Foundation (Diakonissestiftelse) in Copenhagen. In 2015, the estate was sold to private ownership.

== List of owners ==
- (1346– ) Jacob Begere
- ( –1429) Kronen
- (1429) Jørgen Rud
- (1429–1460) Mikkel Rud
- (1460–1470) Otte Rud
- (1460–1505) Jørgen Rud
- (1505–1511) Otto Rud
- (1511–1554) Knud Rud
- (1554–1571) Jørgen Rud
- (1571–1620) Knud Rud
- (1620–1640) Jørgen Grubbe
- (1640–1671) Lene Grubbe, née Rud
- (1671– ) Sivert Jørgensen Grubbe
- ( – ) Hille Bülow, married 1) Grubbe, 2) Lützow
- ( –1696) Jørgen Mathias Frederik Lützow
- (1696– ) Hille Bülow, married 1) Grubbe, 2) Lützow
- ( –1700) Lene Kirstine Grubbe, married 1) von Barner, 2) Barnevitz
- (1700–1712) Friederich August von Barner
- (1712– ) Lene Kirstine Grubbe married 1) von Barner 2) Barnevitz
- ( –1736) Carl Friederich von Barnevitz
- (1736–1738) The estate of Carl Friederich von Barnevitz
- (1738–1768) Joachim Hartwig Johan Barner
- (1768–1775) Helmuth Gotthardt von Barner
- (1775–1811) Hartvig Gottfried von Barner
- (1811–1818) Conradine Johanne Ericha von Barner
- (1818–1844) Peder Sigvard Neergaard
- (1844–1853) Olaus Olavius Meldahl
- (1853–1854) Frederik Vilhelm Schytte
- (1854–1861) Heinrich Gerner Gamst
- (1861–1871) Hans Christian Lund
- (1871–1892) Pauline Lund, née Friis
- (1892–1911) Peder Madsen
- (1911–1917) Charlotte Madsen, née Storck
- (1917–2018) Institutionen Vedbygaard Rekonvalescenthjem
- (2018–) Dan Svenningsen (Amvest)

== See also ==
- Fuglsang Manor
