= Stenlille Municipality =

Former municipality in Denmark

Coordinates: 55°32′8″N 11°35′22″E

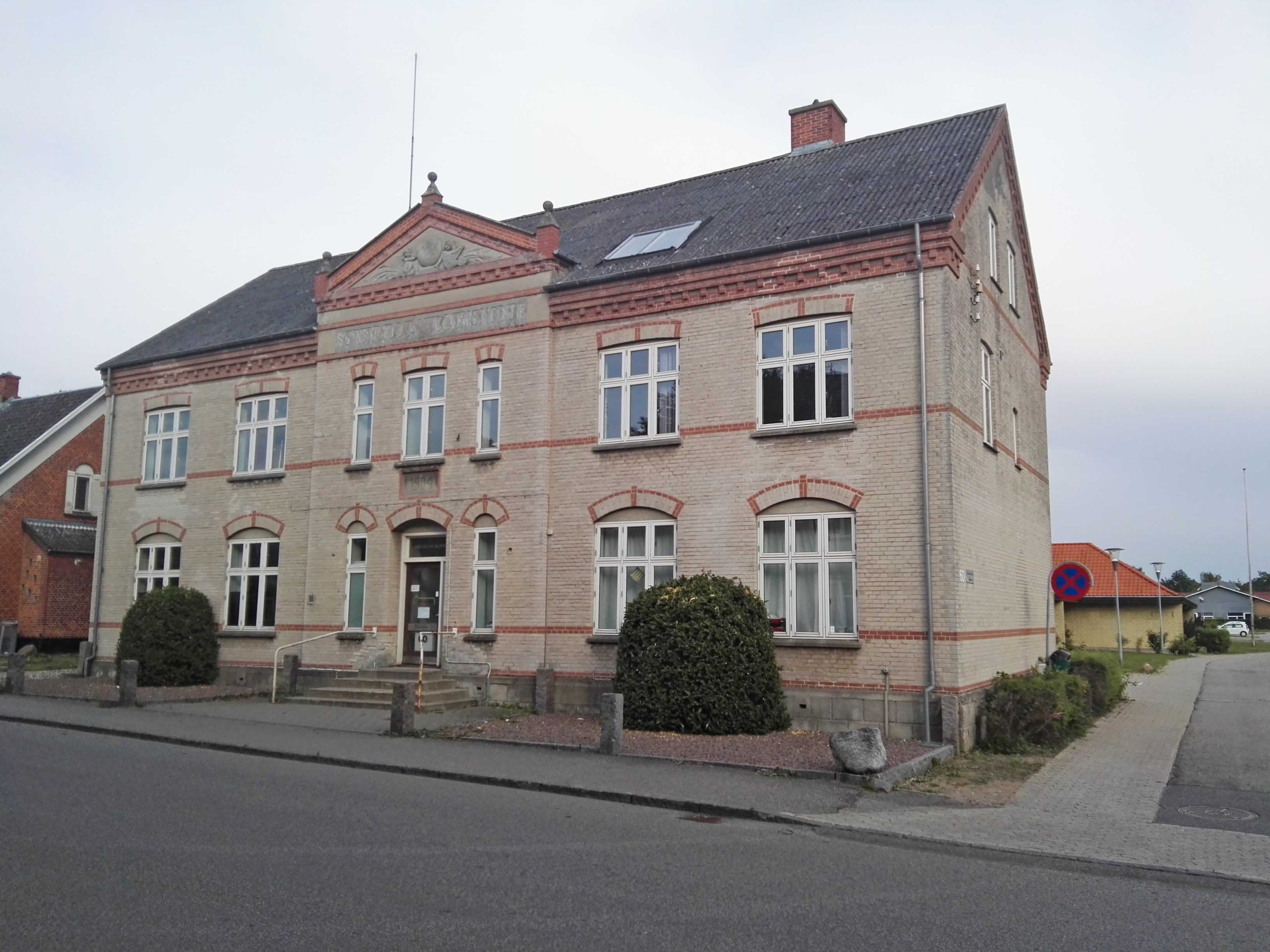
Stenlille Municipality's town hall

Until 1 January 2007 Stenlille municipality was a municipality (Danish, kommune) in the former West Zealand County on the island of Zealand (Sjælland) in east Denmark. The municipality covered an area of 94 km², and had a total population of 5,544 (2005). Its last mayor was Vagn Guldborg, a member of the Venstre (Liberal Party) political party. The main town and the site of its municipal council was the town of Stenlille.

Stenlille municipality ceased to exist as the result of Kommunalreformen ("The Municipality Reform" of 2007). It was merged with existing Sorø and Dianalund municipalities to form the new Sorø municipality. This created a municipality with an area of 317 km² and a total population of 28,336 (2005). The new municipality belongs to Region Sjælland ("Region Zealand").
