= Dianalund Municipality =

Former municipality of Denmark

Coordinates: 55°31′42″N 11°29′36″E

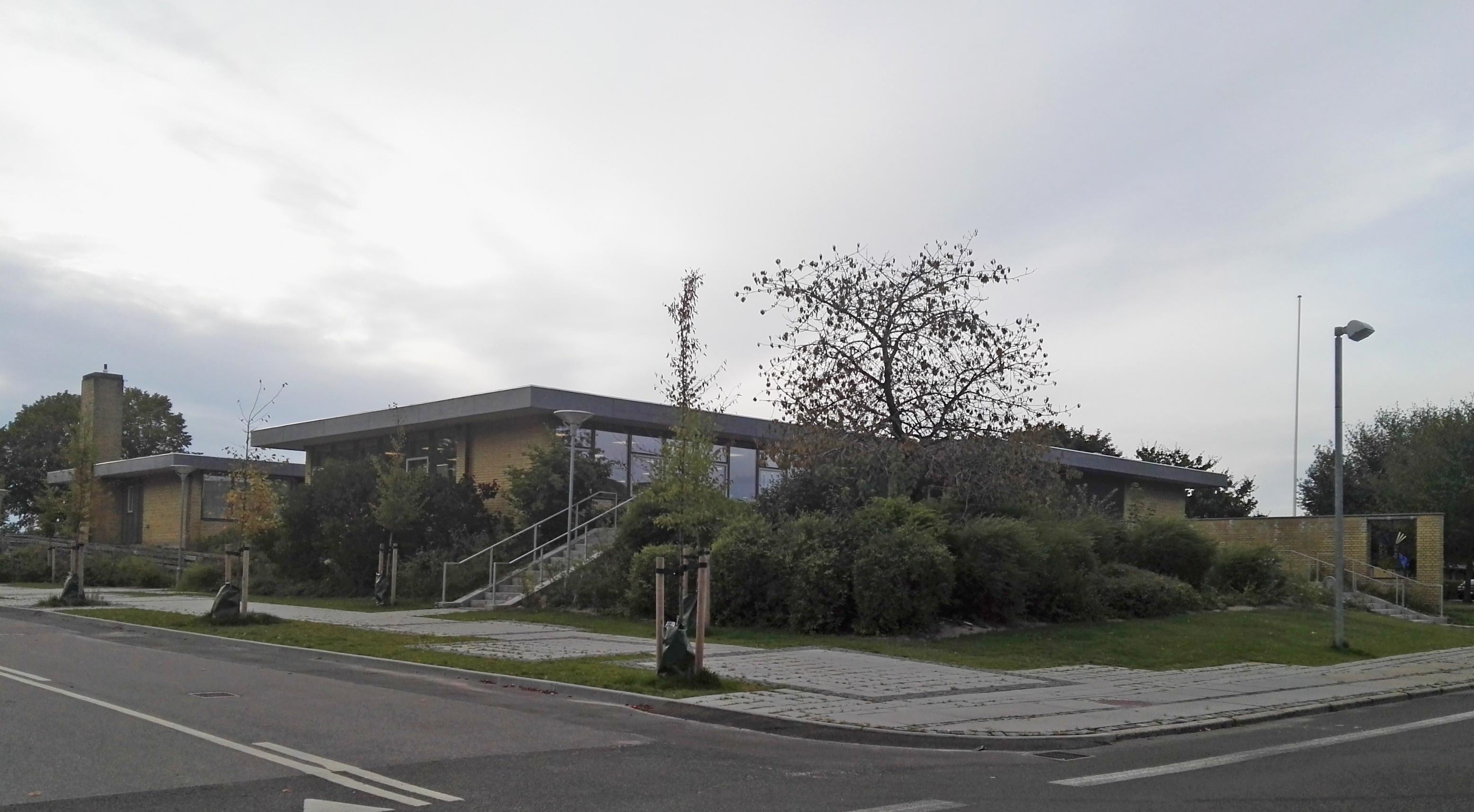

Until 1 January 2007 Dianalund Municipality was a municipality (Danish, kommune) in West Zealand County on the island of Zealand (Sjælland) in east Denmark. The municipality covered an area of 67 km^{2}, and had a total population of 7,406 (2005). Its last mayor was Per Hovmand, a member of the Conservative People's Party (Det Konservative Folkeparti) political party. The main town and the site of its municipal council was the town of Dianalund.

Dianalund Municipality ceased to exist as the result of Kommunalreformen ("The Municipality Reform" of 2007). It was merged with Sorø and Stenlille municipalities to form the new Sorø Municipality. This created a municipality with an area of 317 km^{2} and a total population of 28,336 (2005). The new municipality belongs to Region Sjælland ("Region Zealand").
