= Thomas Skat Rørdam =

Danish bishop

- Bishop of Zealand
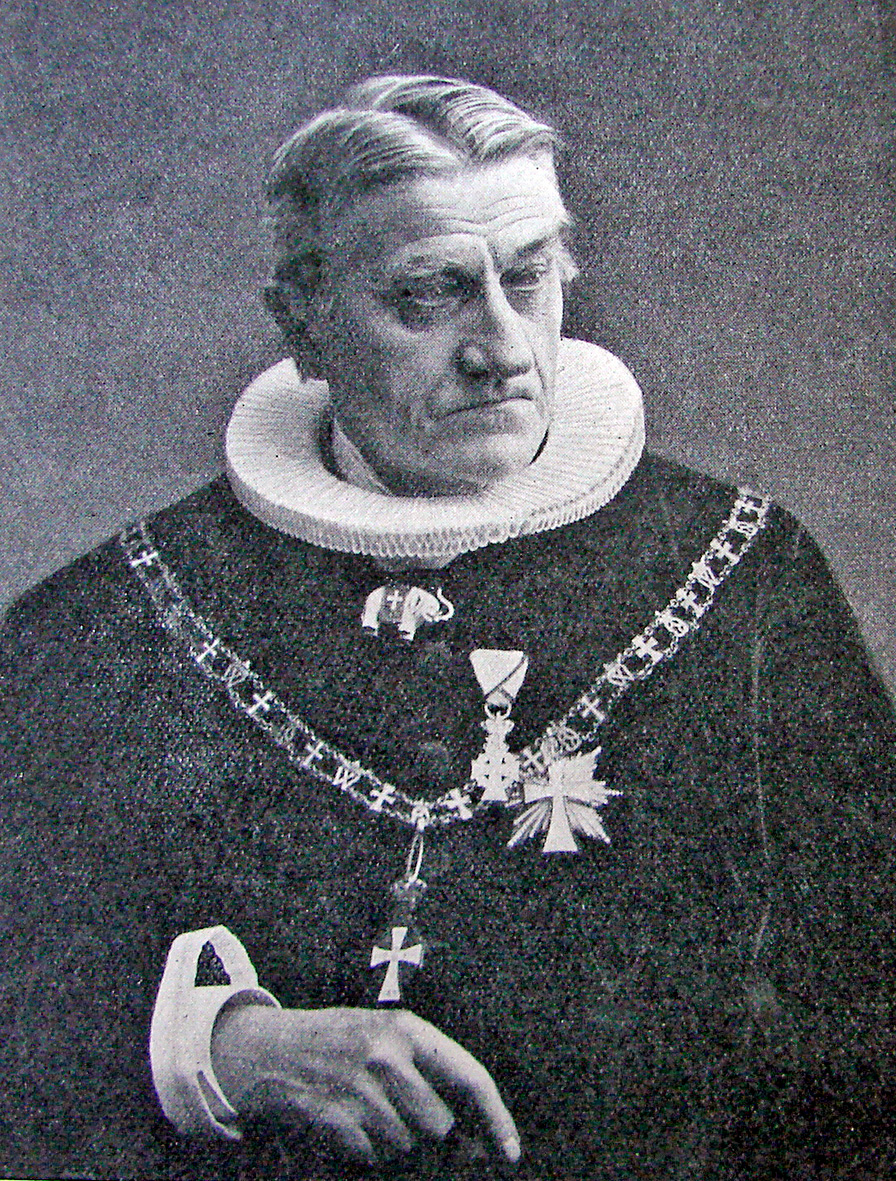
- Church: Church of Denmark
- Diocese: Diocese of Zealand
- In office: 1895–1909
- Predecessor: Bruun Juul Fog
- Successor: Peder Madsen
- Previous post(s): Provost of Holmen Church (1880–1886)

Personal details
- Born: 11 February 1832; Låstrup, Denmark
- Died: 25 September 1909 (aged 77); Copenhagen, Denmark
- Buried: Vestre Cemetery, Copenhagen

Thomas Skat Rørdam (1832–1909) was a Danish priest and theologian who was Bishop of the Diocese of Zealand from 1895 until his death. In the course of his ecclesiastical career, Rørdam served as a local priest in small parishes on Zealand, a parish priest at the Church of the Holy Ghost in Copenhagen, and as provost at Holmen Church before being instated as Bishop of Zealand. He was a decorated member of the Order of the Danneborg.

Rørdam came from a long line of priests and he studied Theology briefly under his father. He later studied at the University of Copenhagen where he became interested in semitic languages. As a theological scholar of the Syriac language, he published translations of a variety of Christian texts in Danish.

== Personal life ==
Rørdam was born on 11 February 1832 at the rectory in Låstrup, a small town in Viborg Municipality, Denmark. His mother, Conradine Engelbreth (1807–1885) was the daughter a provost. His family had many esteemed clergy members in it, and the majority of his male relatives from his father's side of the family were priests by profession. His father, Han Christian Rørdam (1803–1869), was himself a parish priest. His brother, Holger Frederik Rørdam (1830–1913) was a church historian and priest at Taarbæk Church.

Following his return to Denmark after studying in England, Rørdam married Ovine Marie Frederikke Hauch on 19 May 1858. Ovine Marie was born on 13 June 1834 in Sorø and was the daughter of the poet Carsten Hauch. The couple had several children, including Astrid Skat Rørdam (1859–1934), Herdis Rørdam (1861–1950), Gerda Rørdam (1862–1940), Erling Rørdam (1869-1930), Hemming Skat Rørdam (1872-1925), and Torkild Skat Rørdam (1876-1939). Hemming was the rector of Haderslev Seminarium, which later became University College South Denmark. Like many in the Rørdam family, Torkild became a parish priest in Ryslinge.

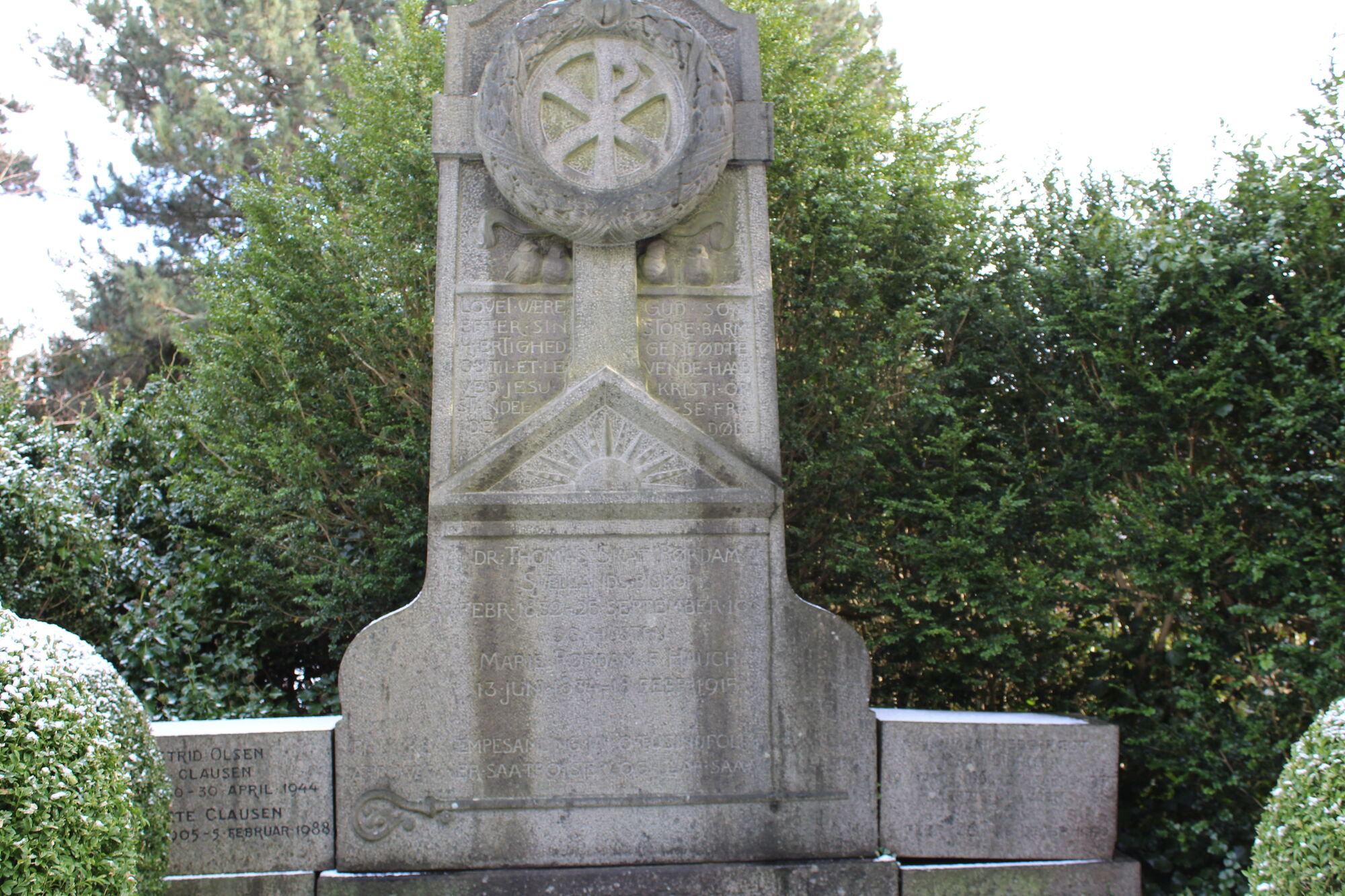
Rørdam's tombstone at Copenhagen's Western Cemetery.

He died on 25 September 1909 in Copenhagen and is buried at Vestre Cemetery.

== Academic career ==
At the age of nine, Rørdam attended school in Fredericia, from which he graduated in 1848. He then undertook the examen philosophicum (Danish: Anden Eksamen), an extended course in philosophy. He spent a year and a half studying under his father to begin his theological studies. In 1851, he attended the University of Copenhagen to formally begin his study of theology. While there, he took an interest in Semitic languages under the tutelage of professor Christen Hermansen. He graduated from the university in 1855 with a candidate degree in theology, and then took up residence at Borchs Kollegium in Copenhagen.

In 1857, with public assistance, he traveled to England to study Syrian manuscripts which had recently been acquired from monasteries in the Wadi Natron. In particular, he studied Bishop Paul of Tella's syro-hexaplar version of the septuagint. Between 1859 and 1861, he then published the Book of Judges and Book of Ruth with greek translations in addition to an analysis of Paul of Tella as a translator. For this work he was awarded a doctoral degree in philosophy in 1859. He was the last to give an oral defense of his work in Latin.

Rørdam returned to Denmark from England and in the following years resided in Copenhagen where he taught at Blaagaard Seminarium and studied privately. At the same time, he was a leader of the "Theologisk Samfund" (English: Theological Society) where he had a significant impact on many theological student. For a short time between 1962 and 1863 he was the headmaster of the Mission School in Copenhagen. In 1866, he applied for the theological docent post in ethics at the University of Copenhagen, but was passed over in favor of Henrik Scharling in 1867. In 1866 he also published Historisk Oplysning om den hellige Skrift (English: Historical Information on the Holy Scripture). Later, while working as a priest, he published a translation of Afrem Syrer's poems from Syriac into Danish, which he titled Aandelige Digte (1879).

== Ecclesiastical career ==
After being denied a position at the university, Rørdam applied for a position as a priest in the countryside. In 1869 he became a priest in Sønderup and Nordrup within the Diocese of Zealand. In 1873 he succeeded Carl Joakim Brandt and became a priest in Rønnebæk and Olstrup near Næstved. Brandt had become Grundtvig's successor in Vartov the year before.

In 1871 he became one of the first members of censors of the theological examination in Denmark, a position which he held until 1886. While he was working as a priest, he continued to actively follow theological discussions. He contributed to the discussion thorough a series of articles in the newspaper Dansk Kirketidende. He also authored a variety of shorter writings and lectures, including: Grundtvig and Luther's Small Catechism (Grundtvig og Luthers lille Katekismus, 1873), Tidens Alvor (1876), Ret og Frihed (1877), and Det er godt at haabe (1879).

In the spring of 1880, when the Church of the Holy Ghost reopened following extensive restoration, he was installed as the church's parish priest. A collection of the sermons he delivered in this first year was published as Kirkeaaret, en Aargang Prædikener (1890), some of which were also included in a later collection: Naadens Aar (1899). In his 1881 publication, De kirkelige Frihedskrav, Rørdam presented and justified various reforms to the Church of Denmark. The publication also reaffirmed the views of the Danish Church in contrast with the Free church tendencies found in the Grundtvigian circle.

In 1886, Rørdam left his position at the Church of the Holy Ghost, and was installed at Holmen Church as its provst. In this position, he was among Copenhagen's most influential clergy members. Many of the cities priests followed him enthusiastically, and he often spoke at meetings at Missionshuset Bethesda, a meeting house used by the church. During this period, Rørdam also found time to publish a new Danish translation of the New Testament, accompanied by a brief introduction and remarks, between 1887 and 1892. In light of this work, the faculty of theology awarded him an honorary doctorate in theology at the crown prince's twentieth anniversary in 1894. His translation, however, was never authorised by the church.

=== Bishop of Zealand ===
When Bruun Juul Fog retired as Bishop of Zealand in 1895, Rørdam was chosen has his successor. Many of the diocese's priests had expressed a desire for him to fill the position, though there is speculation that the position was originally offered to the then bishop of the Diocese of Funen, Harald August Edvard Stein, rejected the offer. Rørdam was ordained on 15 April 1895.

Shortly after becoming Bishop, Rørdam established the Copenhagen Church Foundation (Danish: det Kjøbenhavnske Kirkefond). Rørdam also then became the director of Princess Charlotte Amalie of Denmark's foundation, as well as a council member for the church's seminary, the Vilhelmine-Stiftelsen foundation, and det Kongelige Vajsenhus.

While he had been a provost at Holmen Church, Rørdam had published a proposal that took a more relaxed view on the sacraments of baptism and communion in collaboration with then professor Fredrik Nielsen. These reforms were now entrusted to him as Bishop of Zealand, and he was tasked with producing a new altar book based on the revisions to the sacraments made by the church council. He was a member of the private committee which presented a proposal for the instatement of a new publication hymnal, Hymnal for Church and Home (Danish: Salmebog for Kirke og Hjem). As bishop, it was his role to oversee the final revision of the Hymnal for Church and Home. He was also involved in the preparation of the Roskilde Convention's hymnal.

On his 25th anniversary as a priest in 1894, Rørdam was honored and inducted as a Commander of the Order of the Danneborg, second class. He was elevated to the status of Commander, first class in 1898 and in 1900 was designated as the bishop of the order. In 1904, he received the Dannebrogordenens Hæderstegn.

== Awards ==
- Knight in the Order of the Dannebrog, 1883
- Cross of Honour, 1888
- 2nd-degree Commander in the Order of the Dannebrog, 1894
- 1st-degree Commander in the Order of the Dannebrog, 1898
- Grand Cross of the Order of the Dannebrog, 1904

== Selected bibliography ==
- Historisk Oplysning om den hellige Skrift, 1866
- Grundtvig og Luthers lille Katekismus, 1873
- Tidens Alvor, 1876
- Ret og Frihed, 1877
- Aandelige Digte, 1879
- Det er godt at haabe, 1879
- Kirkeaaret, en Aargang Prædikener, 1890
- Naadens Aar, 1899
- Det Ny Testament oversat med Anmærkning til Oplysning for kristne Lægfolk, 1903
