= Henrik Gamst =

Danish industrialist

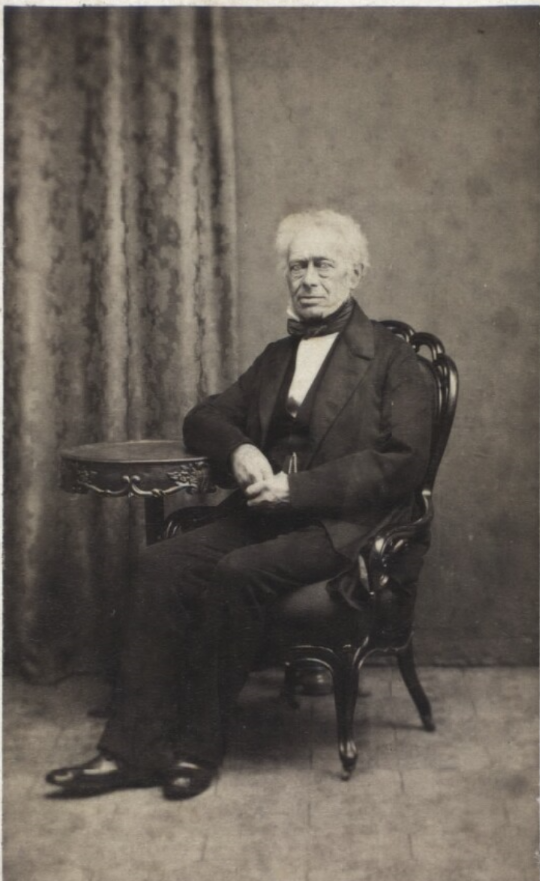
Henrik Gamst

Henrik Gamst (3 September 1788 – 3 September 1861) was a Danish industrialist, politician and landowner.

== Early life ==
Gamst was born on 3 September 1788 in Copenhagen, the son of Hans Christensen Gamst (1737–1803) and Marthe Marie Storch (1751–1830). His father had established an iron foundry in 1782. The company was continued by Gamst's mother and paternal uncle Johannes Christian Gamst (1751–1829) after the father's death in 1803.

== H. Gamst & H. C. Lund ==
Gamst joined the family business as a partner in 1811 and became its sole owner in 1829. In 1836 the name of the company was changed to H. Gamst & H. C. Lund when Gamst's nephew Hans Christian Lund became a partner. In 1854, it was taken over by P. J. Winstrup and V. C. Gamél. In 1872, it was taken over by Johannes Henrik Hellerung and J. C. Hauberg.

== Property ==
Upon selling his company in 1854, Gamst purchased Vedbygård at Holbæk.

== Other activities ==
Gamst was a member of the Council of 32 Men (and later the Copenhagen City Council) in 1830–1846. He was a member of the Roskilde Constituent Assembly. He was a co-founder of Industriforeningen. He was also involved in the establishment of Thorvaldsens Museum.

== See also ==
- Caspar Fincke
