= Sorø Municipality =

Sorø Municipality Sorø Kommune (Danish)
- Municipality
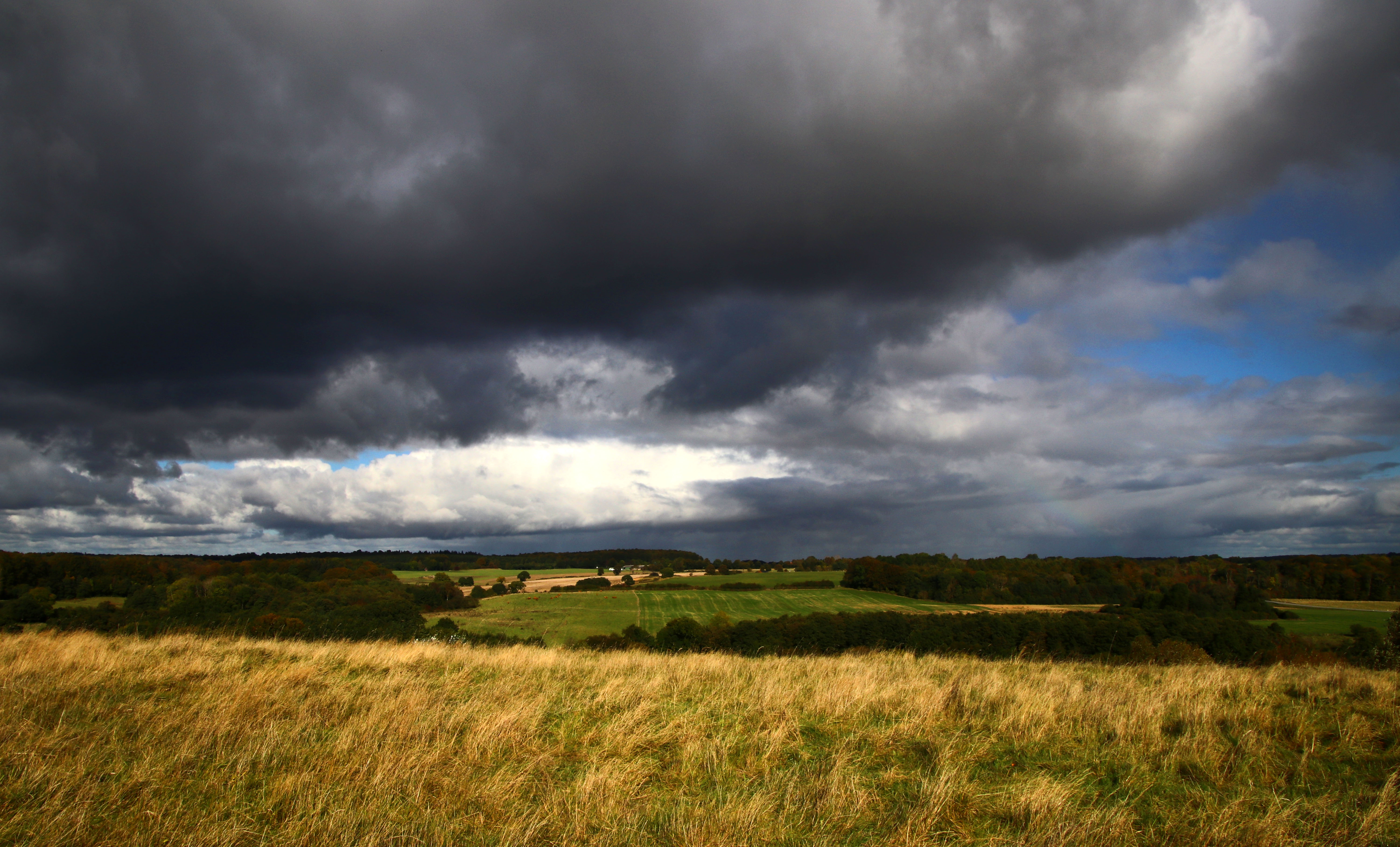

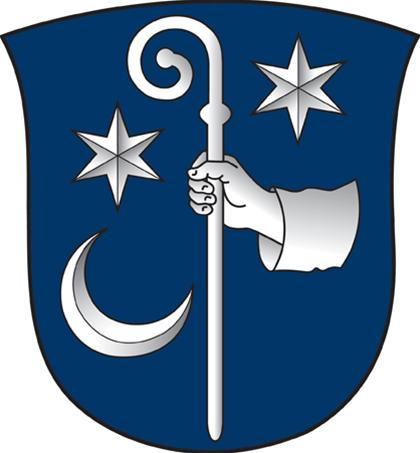
- Coat of arms

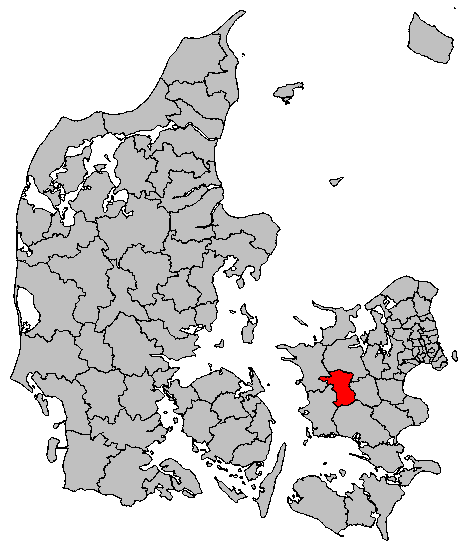
- Coordinates: 55°26′00″N 11°34′00″E
- Country: Denmark
- Region: Zealand
- Established: 1 January 2007
- Seat: Sorø

Government
  - Mayor: Gert Jørgensen (C)

Area
  - Total: 311.05 km^{2} (120.10 sq mi)

Population (1 January 2026)
  - Total: 30,853
  - Density: 99.190/km^{2} (256.90/sq mi)
- Time zone: UTC+1 (CET)
  - Summer (DST): UTC+2 (CEST)
- Island: Zealand
- Municipal code: 340
- Website: soroe.dk

Sorø Municipality (Danish: Sorø Kommune) is a kommune in the Region Sjælland on the island of Zealand in east Denmark. The municipality covers an area of 317 km^{2} (122 sq mi), and has a total population of 30,853 (2026). The main town and the site of its municipal council is the town of Sorø. Other towns in the municipality are Dianalund, Stenlille, and Ruds Vedby.

On 1 January 2007 Sorø municipality was, as the result of Kommunalreformen ("The Municipal Reform" of 2007), merged with existing Dianalund and Stenlille municipalities to form the new Sorø municipality.

== Locations ==
The ten largest urban areas in the municipality (as of 1 January 2025) are:

#	Locality	Population (2025)
1	Sorø	8,433
2	Dianalund	4,111
3	Frederiksberg	3,700
4	Stenlille	2,087
5	Ruds Vedby	1,670
6	Fjenneslev	820
7	Nyrup	450
8	Munke Bjergby	330
9	Vedde	310
10	Tersløse	260

=== The city of Sorø ===
The city of Sorø has a population of **8,433** (2025) and is the seat of the municipal council.

=== The city of Sorø ===
The city of Sorø has a population of 7,754 (2015) and is the site of both the municipal council and the county council. It was scheduled to be regional seat for Region Sjælland, one of the five new regions to be implantated in Denmark 1 January 2007.

While by no means the biggest city in Denmark, it has great historical value. It was founded in 1161 by Bishop Absalon, later the founder of Copenhagen, and is the site of Sorø Academy (Danish Sorø Akademi) and Sorø Klosterkirke, the church where Absalon is buried, along with other notable Danes, including royalty. Queen Margaret I of Denmark was buried at this church until moved to Roskilde Cathedral in Roskilde.

== Politics ==
=== Municipal council ===
Sorø's municipal council consists of 25 members, elected every four years.

Below are the municipal councils elected since the Municipal Reform of 2007.

Election	Party										Total seats	Turnout	Elected mayor
Election	A	B	C	F	J	O	U	V	Ø	Å	Total seats	Turnout	Elected mayor
2005	12		5	1	1	1	1	4			25	72.4%	Ivan Hansen (A)
2009	11		5	3		2		4			25	68.2%	Ivan Hansen (A)
2013	8	1	6	1		3		5	1		25	74.7%	Gert Jørgensen (C)
2017	8	1	7	1		3		3	1	1	25	72.3%	Gert Jørgensen (C)
Data from Kmdvalg.dk 2005, 2009, 2013 and 2017

== Image gallery ==
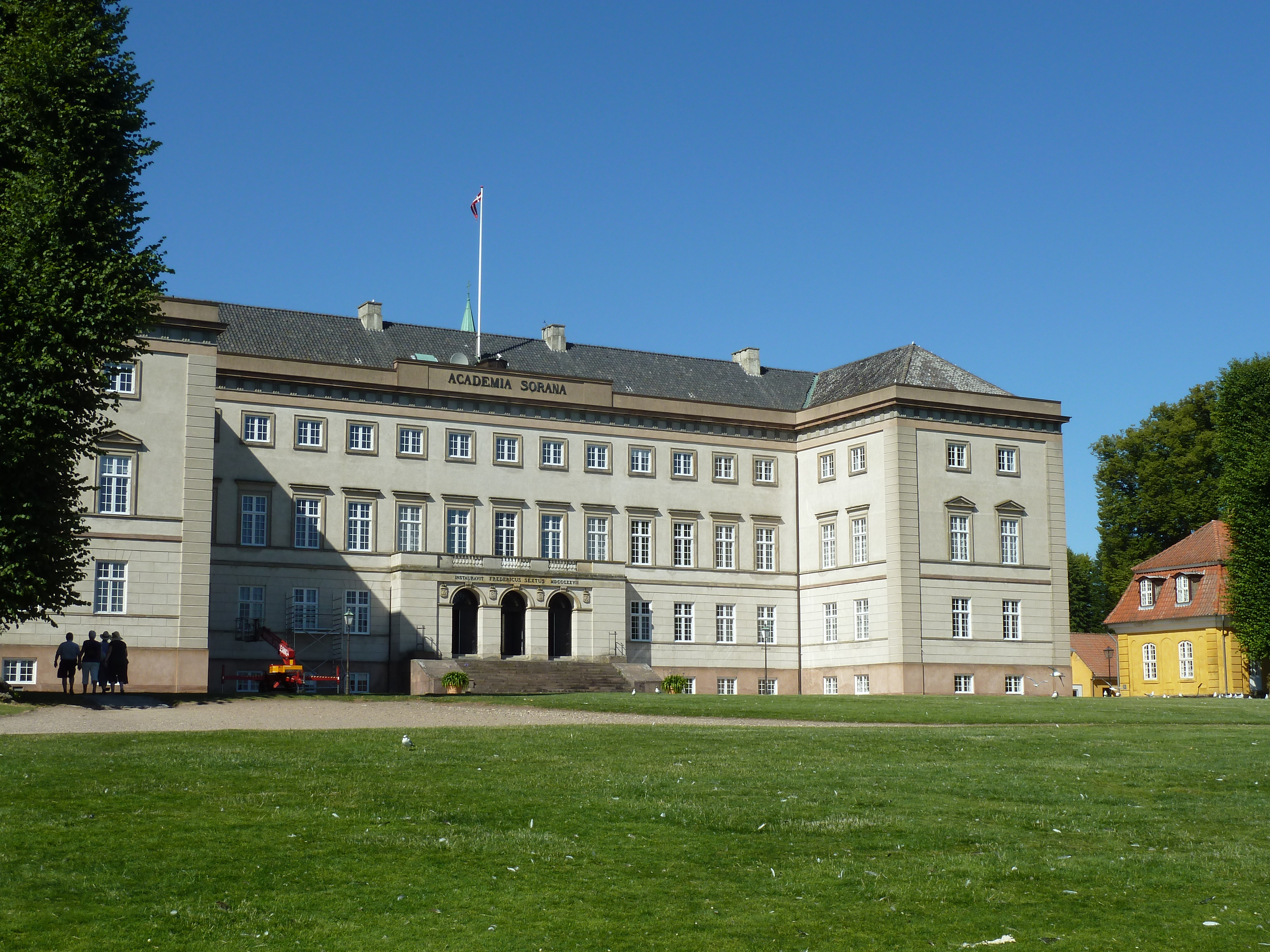
Sorø Academy

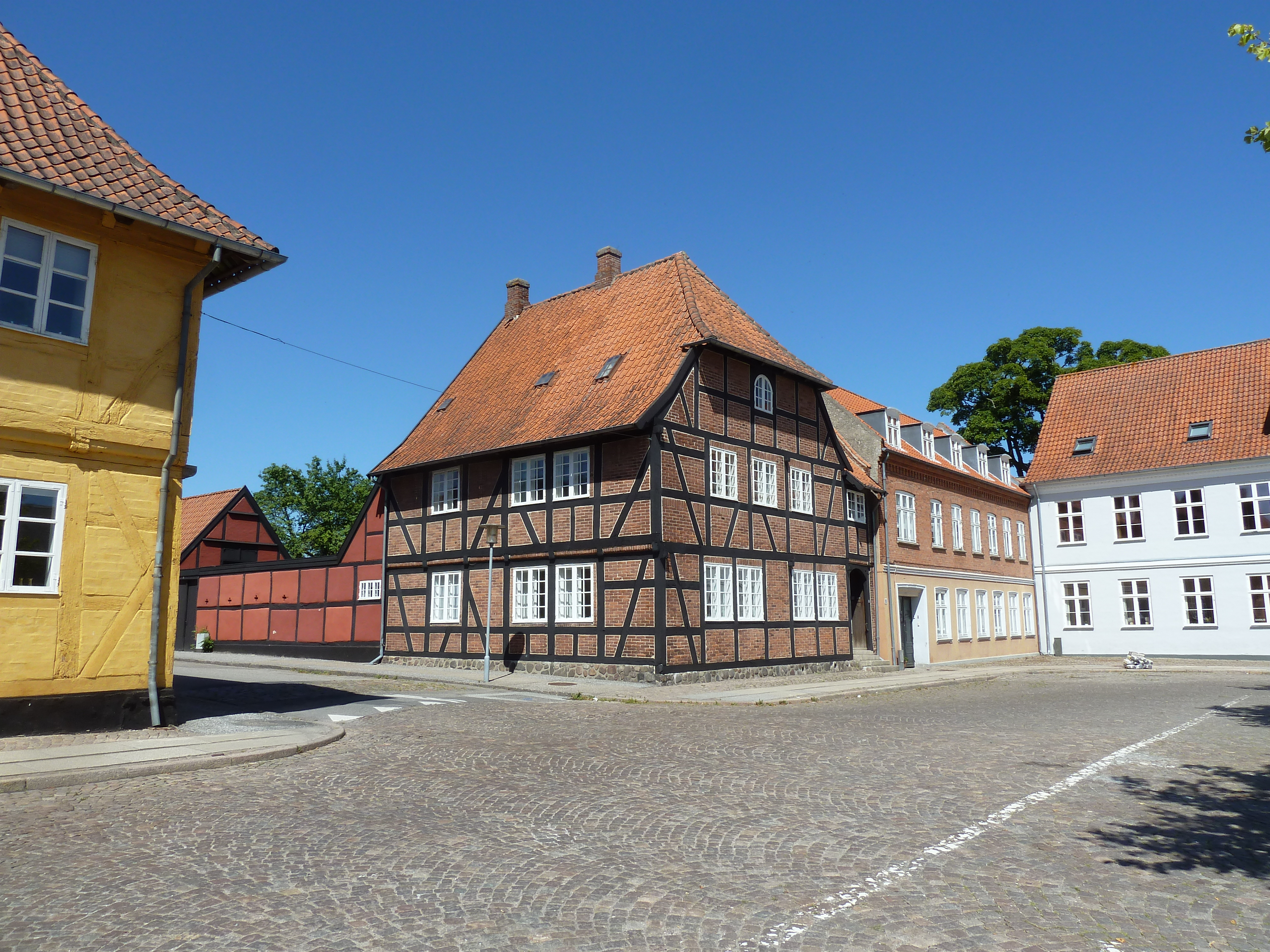
Central Sorø

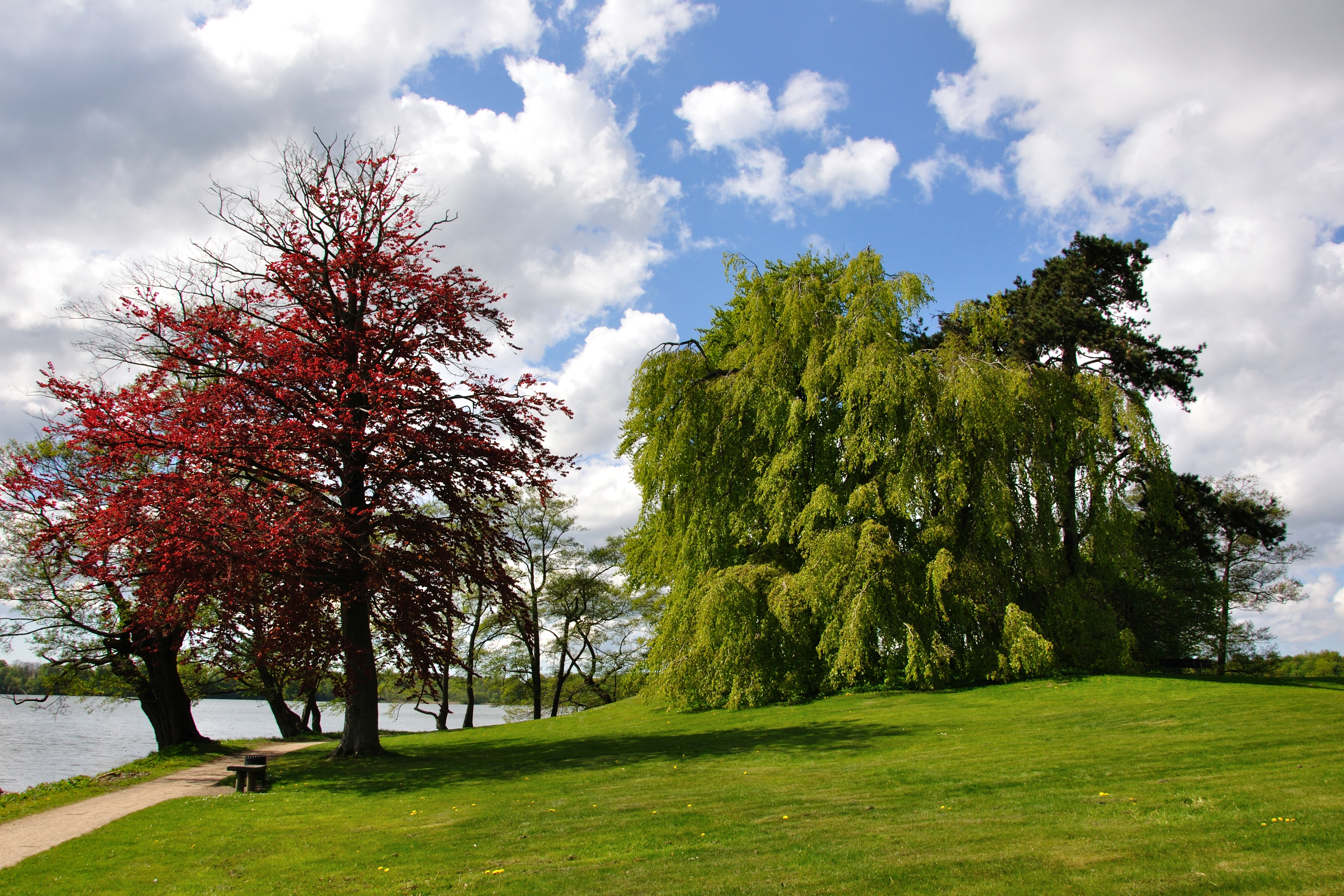
The shore of the lake

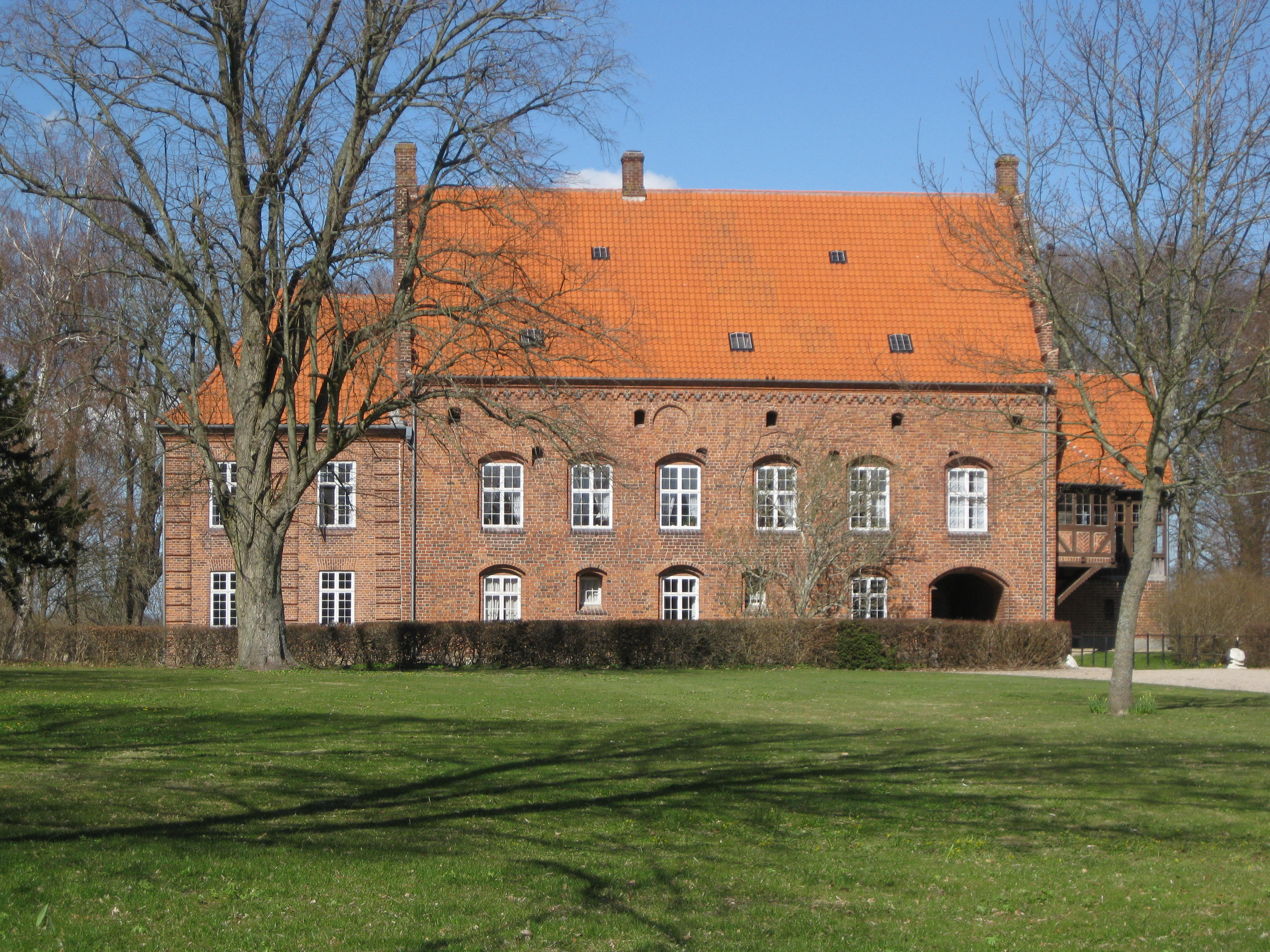
Vedbygård
