= Stenlille =

- Town
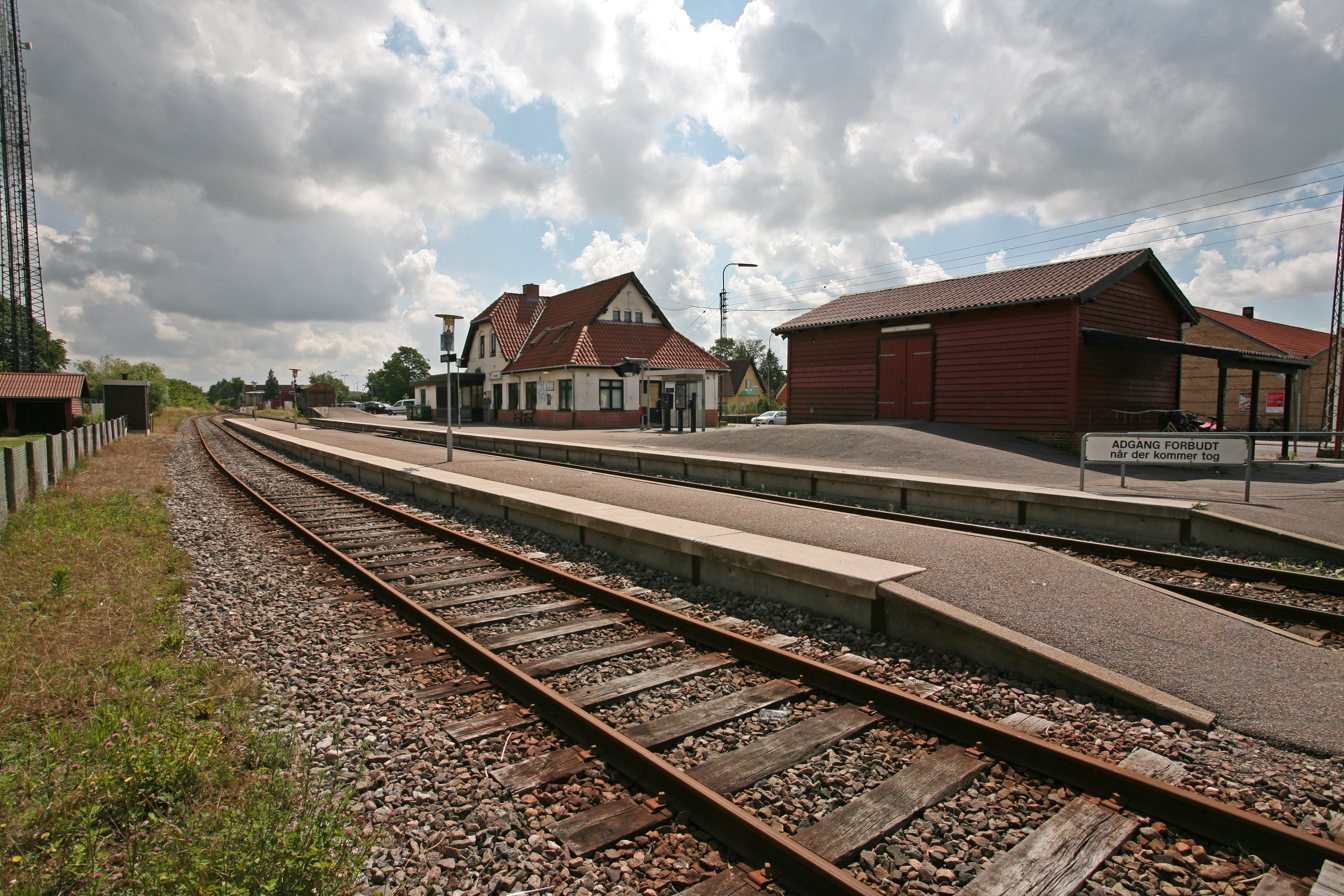
- Stenlille railway station

- Location within Denmark Location within Denmark Region Zealand
- Coordinates: 55°32′20″N 11°35′30″E
- Country: Denmark
- Region: Region Zealand
- Municipality: Sorø Municipality

Area
  - Urban: 1.3 km^{2} (0.50 sq mi)

Population (2026)
  - Urban: 2,074
  - Urban density: 1,600/km^{2} (4,100/sq mi)
- Time zone: UTC+1 (CET)
  - Summer (DST): UTC+2 (CEST)
- Postal code: DK-4295 Stenlille

Stenlille is a railway town, with a population of 2,074 (1 January 2026), in Sorø Municipality, Region Zealand in Denmark.

Stenlille was the municipal seat of the former Stenlille Municipality until 1 January 2007.

Stenlille is served by Stenlille railway station on the Tølløse railway line.

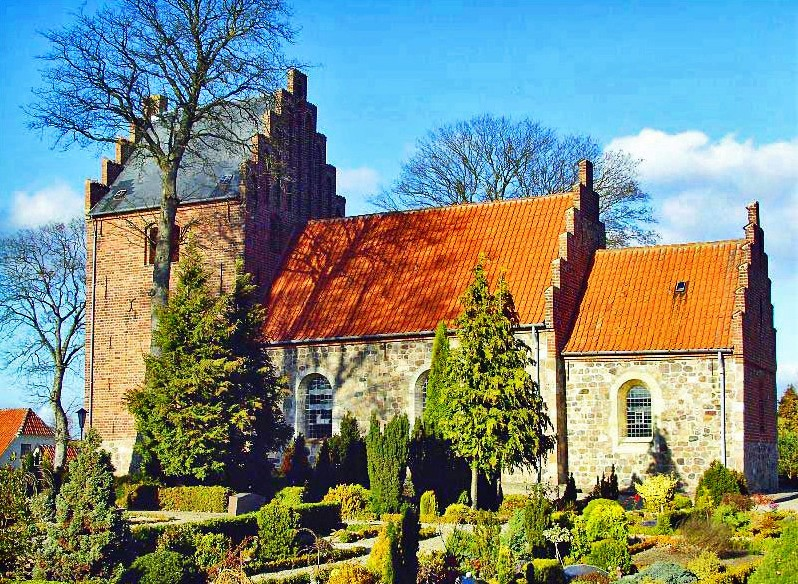
Stenlille Church

Stenlille Church is located in the southern part of the town.

One of Denmark's two underground sites for natural gas storage is located near Stenlille. In operation since 1989, it has a capacity of 3 billion cubic meters.

== Sources ==
- Laier, T.; Øbro, H. (2009). "Environmental and safety monitoring of the natural gas underground storage at Stenlille, Denmark". Geological Society, London, Special Publications. 313 (1): 81–92. doi:10.1144/SP313.6. ISSN 0305-8719.
