= Gert Jørgensen =

Danish footballer (born 1957)

Personal information
- Date of birth: 16 February 1957 (age 69)
- Place of birth: Nykøbing Falster, Denmark
- Position: Forward

Senior career*
Years	Team	Apps	(Gls)
1976–1981	B1901 Nyköbing		
1981–1985	SSW Innsbruck		
1985–1987	Brøndby IF		

International career
1977–1978	Denmark	4	(2)
- * Club domestic league appearances and goals

Gert Jørgensen (born 16 February 1957) is a Danish former footballer who played as a forward. He made four appearances for the Denmark national team from 1977 to 1978.
