= Ruds Vedby =

Ruds Vedby Ruds Vedby
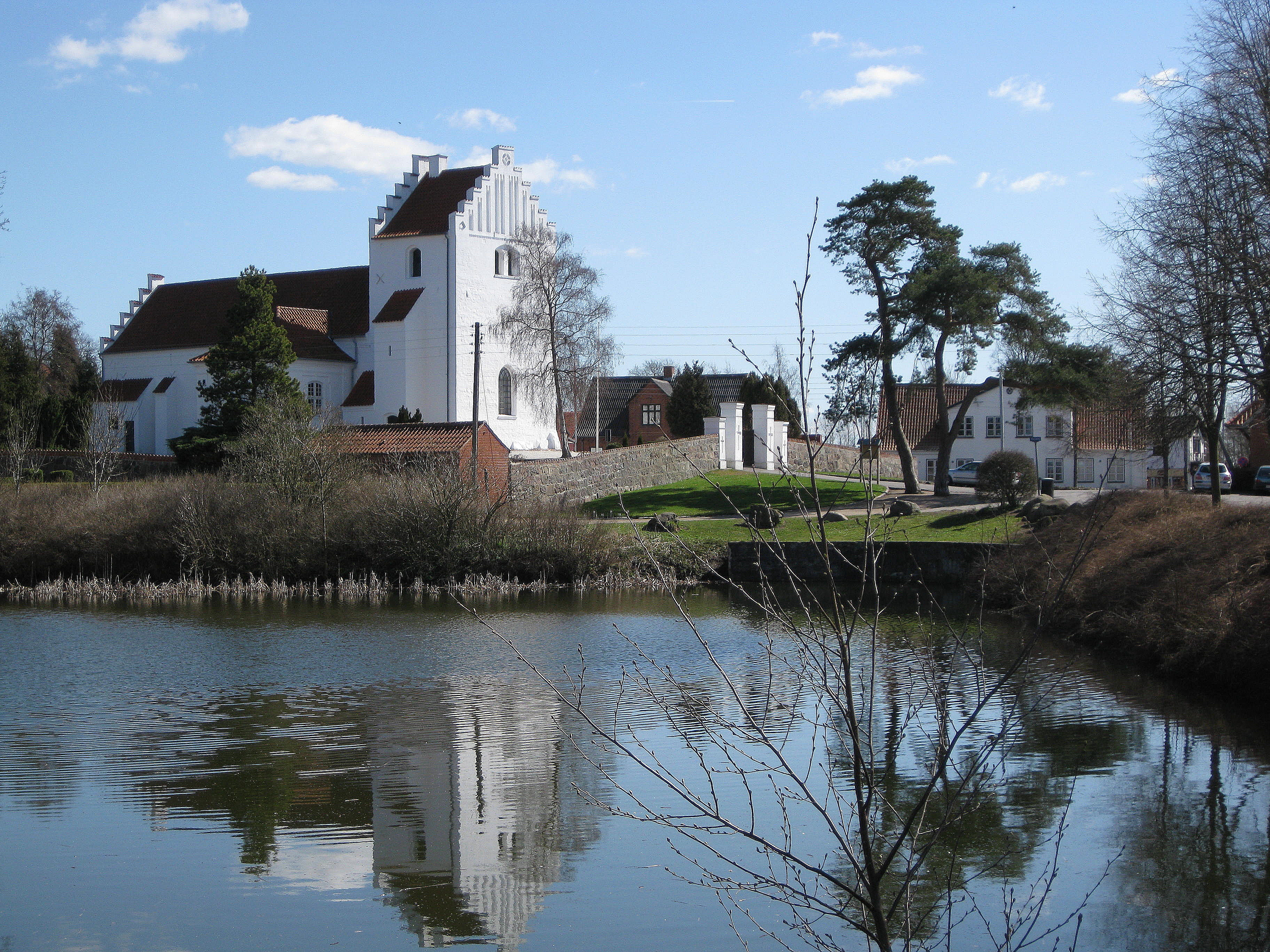
- Ruds Vedby

- Location in Denmark Ruds Vedby (Denmark Region Zealand)
- Coordinates: 55°32′30″N 11°22′33″E
- Country: Denmark
- Region: Zealand (Sjælland)
- Municipality: Sorø
- Current municipality: 2007-01-01

Government
  - Lokalrådsformand: Ingse Rasmussen

Area
  - Urban: 1.11 km^{2} (0.43 sq mi)

Population (2026-01-01)
  - Urban: 1,661
  - Urban density: 1,500/km^{2} (3,880/sq mi)
- Time zone: UTC+1 (CET)
  - Summer (DST): UTC+1 (CEST)

Ruds Vedby, in Sorø Municipality, is a small town located on the railway between Tølløse and Høng in West Zealand, eastern Denmark. Ruds Vedby is located 18 km north of Slagelse, 8 km west of Dianalund and 20 km north-west of Sorø. As of 1 January 2026, the population was 1,661.

== History ==
It takes its name after Vedbygård manor, to which it owes its existence, and the Rud family who owned the estate from 1421 until 1671 (Rud's Vedby).

== Attractions ==
- Vedbygård (park open at Sundays)
- Ruds Vedby Church

== Transport ==
Ruds Vedby station is located on the Høng–Tølløse railway line. Train service is operated by the railway company Lokaltog A/S.
