= Dianalund =

- Town
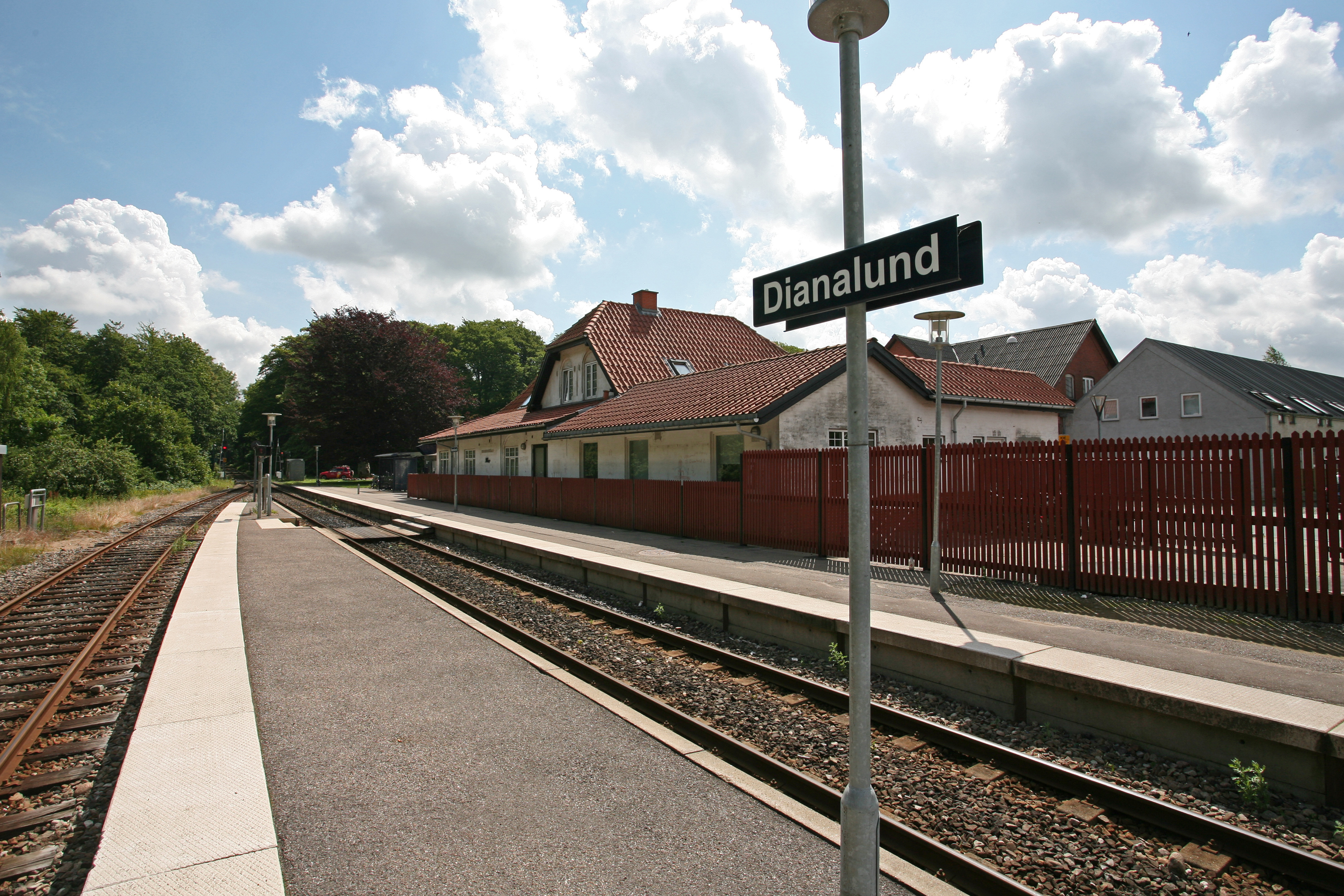
- Dianalund railway station

- Location in Denmark Dianalund (Denmark Region Zealand)
- Coordinates: 55°31′38″N 11°29′53″E
- Country: Denmark
- Region: Region Zealand
- Municipality: Sorø Municipality

Area
  - Urban: 2.5 km^{2} (0.97 sq mi)

Population (2026)
  - Urban: 4,132
  - Urban density: 1,700/km^{2} (4,300/sq mi)
  - Gender: 1,987 males and 2,145 females
- Time zone: UTC+1 (CET)
  - Summer (DST): UTC+2 (CEST)
- Postal code: DK-4293 Dianalund

Dianalund is a railway town on the west central part of the island of Zealand, Denmark. It has a population of 4,132 (1 January 2026), making it the second largest town in Sorø Municipality.

Dianalund was the municipal seat of the former Dianalund Municipality, until 1 January 2007.

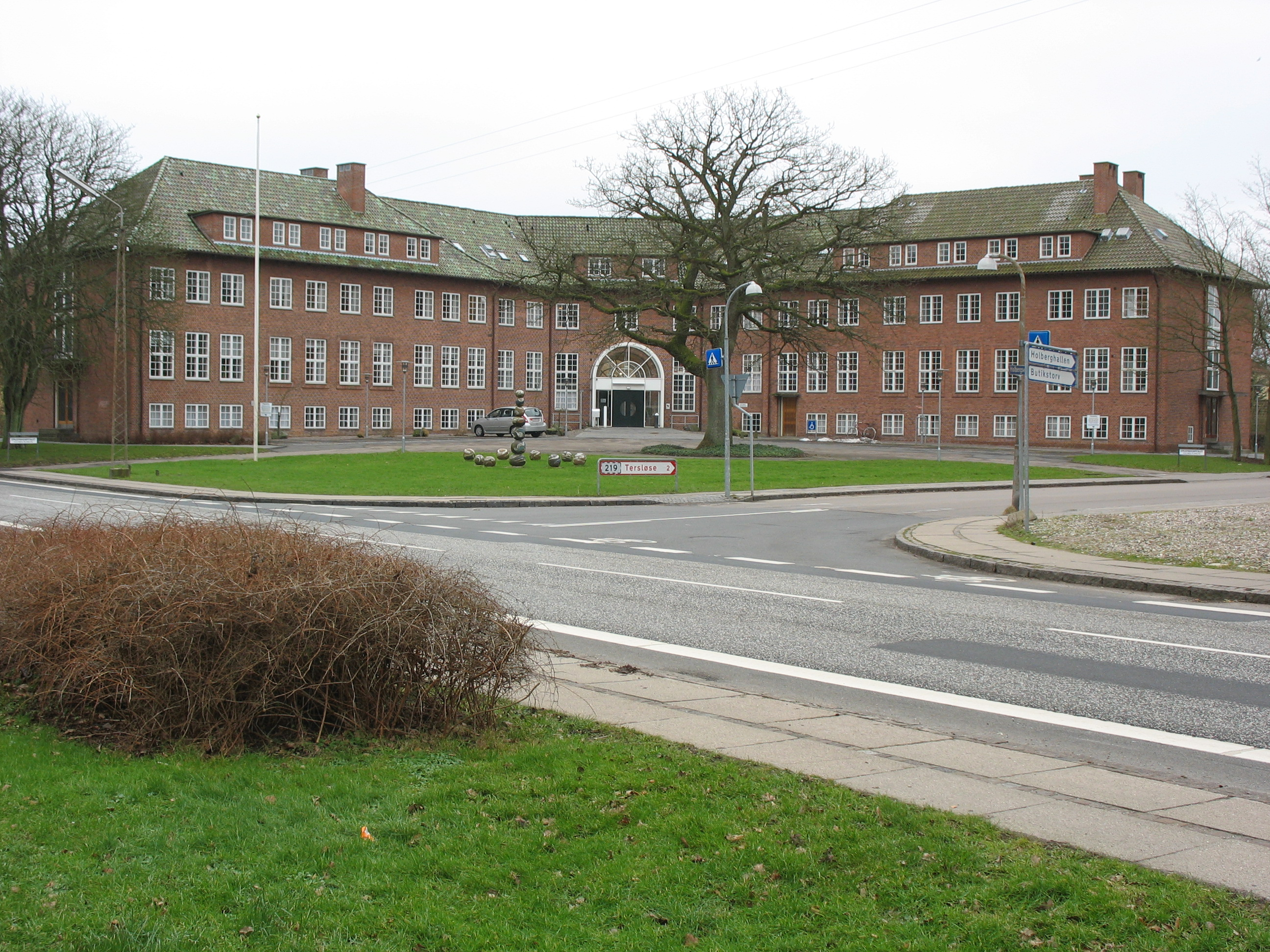
Filadelfia - the epilepsy hospital

Kolonien Filadelfia, the only epilepsy hospital in Denmark, is located in the town.

Dianalund is served by Dianalund railway station, located on the Tølløse railway line.
