= 2025 Allerød municipal election =

Municipal election in Denmark

← 2021	18 November 2025	2029 →

All 21 seats to the Allerød municipal council 11 seats needed for a majority
- Turnout: 15,949 (79.7%) ▲0.8%
	First party	Second party	Third party
	V	C	F
Party	Venstre	Conservatives	Green Left
Last election	6 seats, 25.7%	7 seats, 30.5%	2 seats, 10.0%
Seats won	7	5	3
Seat change	▲1	▼2	▲1
Popular vote	4,852	3,575	1,986
Percentage	30.9%	22.7%	12.6%
Swing	▲5.1%	▼7.7%	▲2.6%
	Fourth party	Fifth party	Sixth party
	A	Ø	B
Party	Social Democrats	Red-Green Alliance	Social Liberals
Last election	4 seats, 16.0%	1 seat, 6.8%	1 seat, 6.2%
Seats won	2	2	1
Seat change	▼2	▲1	0
Popular vote	1,692	1,423	670
Percentage	10.8%	9.1%	4.3%
Swing	▼5.2%	▲2.2%	▼2.0%
	Seventh party
	I
Party	Liberal Alliance
Last election	0 seats, 0.9%
Seats won	1
Seat change	▲1
Popular vote	623
Percentage	4.0%
Swing	▲3.1%
Mayor before election
Karsten Längerich
Venstre
Mayor after election
Clara Rao
Venstre

The 2025 Allerød Municipal election was held on November 18, 2025, in the Danish municipality of Allerød to elect the 21 members to sit in the regional council for the Allerød Municipal council, in the period of 2026 to 2029. Clara Rao from Venstre, would win the mayoral position.

== Background ==
Following the 2021 election, Karsten Längerich from Venstre became mayor for his second term. This was despite, the Conservatives winning the most votes and seats. Throughout the current period, the Conservatives lost 3 councillors, of whom all 3 currently sit for the Moderates, making the mayor's party, Venstre, currently the largest in the council.

== Electoral system ==
For elections to Danish municipalities, a number varying from 9 to 31 are chosen to be elected to the municipal council. The seats are then allocated using the D'Hondt method and a closed list proportional representation. Allerød Municipality had 21 seats in 2025.

== Electoral alliances ==
=== Electoral Alliance 1 ===
Party		Political alignment
A	Social Democrats	Centre-left
B	Social Liberals	Centre to Centre-left
F	Green Left	Centre-left to Left-wing
Ø	Red-Green Alliance	Left-wing to Far-Left

=== Electoral Alliance 2 ===
Party		Political alignment
I	Liberal Alliance	Centre-right to Right-wing
O	Danish People's Party	Right-wing to Far-right
U	Allerød Listen	Local politics

=== Electoral Alliance 3 ===
Party		Political alignment
M	Moderates	Centre to Centre-right
V	Venstre	Centre-right

== Results by polling station ==
Division	A	B	C	F	I	M	O	U	V	Ø
Division	%	%	%	%	%	%	%	%	%	%
Blovstrød	8.2	4.3	20.5	19.0	5.1	0.9	2.8	1.0	31.5	6.7
Skovvang	13.0	4.4	23.7	13.2	3.4	1.0	4.1	0.8	22.3	14.0
Lillerød	10.2	5.2	26.0	13.6	3.2	1.0	1.9	0.8	27.6	10.5
Lynge	13.1	3.2	17.8	9.7	4.7	2.5	5.5	0.6	36.0	6.9
Ravnsholt	9.0	4.2	24.2	10.1	3.9	2.3	2.5	0.8	36.1	6.8

== Results ==
Party		Votes	%	+/-	Seats	+/-
Allerød Municipality
V	Venstre	4,852	30.87	+5.15	7	+1
C	Conservatives	3,575	22.75	-7.72	5	-2
F	Green Left	1,986	12.64	+2.65	3	+1
A	Social Democrats	1,692	10.77	-5.22	2	-2
Ø	Red-Green Alliance	1,423	9.05	+2.24	2	+1
B	Social Liberals	670	4.26	-1.96	1	0
I	Liberal Alliance	623	3.96	+3.07	1	+1
O	Danish People's Party	518	3.30	+2.54	0	0
M	Moderates	253	1.61	New	0	New
U	Allerød Listen	124	0.79	New	0	New
Total		15,716	100	N/A	21	N/A
Invalid votes		37	0.18	-0.04		
Blank votes		196	0.98	+0.21		
Turnout		15,949	79.66	+0.78		
Source: valg.dk

== Opinion polls ==
Polling firm	Fieldwork date	Sample size	C	V	A	F	Ø	B	I	O	M	U	Others	Lead
Epinion	4 Sep - 13 Oct 2025	479	25.0	23.0	13.1	10.8	10.3	5.2	6.1	4.1	2.1	–	0.2	2.0
2024 european parliament election	9 Jun 2024		12.4	17.3	12.0	17.9	4.2	10.5	8.6	4.0	8.5	–	–	0.6
2022 general election	1 Nov 2022		8.8	17.8	20.5	8.7	3.6	7.0	9.6	1.6	12.1	–	–	2.7
2021 regional election	16 Nov 2021		29.2	19.3	17.2	10.2	5.4	9.2	1.6	1.7	–	–	–	9.9
2021 municipal election	16 Nov 2021		30.5 (7)	25.7 (6)	16.0 (4)	10.0 (2)	6.8 (1)	6.2 (1)	0.9 (0)	0.8 (0)	–	–	–	4.8
