= 2021 Allerød municipal election =

← 2017	16 November 2021	2025 →

All 21 seats to the Allerød Municipal Council 11 seats needed for a majority
- Turnout: 15,388 (78.9%) ▼2.2pp
	First party	Second party	Third party
	C	V	A
Party	Conservatives	Venstre	Social Democrats
Last election	5 seats, 20.9%	5 seats, 18.1%	5 seats, 20.1%
Seats won	7	6	4
Seat change	▲2	▲1	▼1
Popular vote	4,626	3,906	2,428
Percentage	30.5%	25.7%	16.0%
Swing	▲9.6%	▲7.6%	▼4.1%
	Fourth party	Fifth party	Sixth party
	F	Ø	B
Party	Green Left	Red–Green Alliance	Social Liberals
Last election	2 seats, 8.6%	1 seat, 4.3%	1 seat, 6.1%
Seats won	2	1	1
Seat change	0	0	0
Popular vote	1,517	1,034	945
Percentage	10.0%	6.8%	6.2%
Swing	▲1.4%	▲2.5%	▲0.1%
Mayor before election
Karsten Längerich
Venstre
Mayor after election
Karsten Längerich
Venstre

Following the 2017 election, Venstre won the mayor's position from the Conservatives who had held it since 1994. From 1970 to 1993, Venstre had also held the position, and they remain the only parties to have held it in the municipality. (Note: the municipality was altered most recently in 1970)

In this election, Conservatives would win 7 seats, and become the largest party in front of Venstre with 6 seats. Venstre still tried to win the mayor's position, and managed to find an agreement with the Social Democrats, the Social Liberals and the Green Left, an untraditional agreement with 3 parties from the red bloc.

== Electoral system ==
For elections to Danish municipalities, a number varying from 9 to 31 are chosen to be elected to the municipal council. The seats are then allocated using the D'Hondt method and a closed list proportional representation. Allerød Municipality had 21 seats in 2021

Unlike in Danish General Elections, in elections to municipal councils, electoral alliances are allowed.

== Electoral alliances ==
=== Electoral Alliance 1 ===
Party		Political alignment
B	Social Liberals	Centre to Centre-left
V	Venstre	Centre-right

=== Electoral Alliance 2 ===
Party		Political alignment
A	Social Democrats	Centre-left
F	Green Left	Centre-left to Left-wing
Q	Feministisk Intiativ	Local politics
Ø	Red–Green Alliance	Left-wing to Far-Left

=== Electoral Alliance 3 ===
Party		Political alignment
C	Conservatives	Centre-right
D	New Right	Right-wing to Far-right
I	Liberal Alliance	Centre-right to Right-wing
O	Danish People's Party	Right-wing to Far-right

== Results by polling station ==
Q = Feministisk Intiativ

Division	A	B	C	D	F	I	O	Q	V	Ø
Division	%	%	%	%	%	%	%	%	%	%
Blovstrød	10.7	8.0	26.3	3.0	14.3	0.7	0.7	0.3	27.7	8.2
Skovvang	18.9	6.8	29.9	3.0	12.4	0.9	1.1	0.3	17.8	8.8
Lillerød	17.4	7.4	29.4	2.3	10.8	0.8	0.7	0.2	24.9	6.1
Lynge	17.1	3.8	28.0	3.9	6.2	0.8	0.7	0.1	31.8	7.6
Ravnsholt	14.4	5.6	36.2	2.6	8.0	1.1	0.6	0.2	26.8	4.6

== Results ==
Party		Votes	%	+/-	Seats	+/-
Allerød Municipality
C	Conservatives	4,626	30.47	+9.57	7	+2
V	Venstre	3,906	25.72	+7.64	6	+1
A	Social Democrats	2,428	15.99	-4.07	4	-1
F	Green Left	1,517	9.99	+1.36	2	0
Ø	Red-Green Alliance	1,034	6.81	+2.55	1	0
B	Social Liberals	945	6.22	+0.14	1	0
D	New Right	445	2.93	+0.39	0	0
I	Liberal Alliance	136	0.90	-1.54	0	0
O	Danish People's Party	115	0.76	-2.83	0	0
Q	Feministisk Initiativ	32	0.21	New	0	New
Total		15,184	100	N/A	21	N/A
Invalid votes		44	0.23	-0.22		
Blank votes		160	0.82	-0.38		
Turnout		15,388	78.88	-2.22		
Source: valg.dk
