= Center Sandholm =

Danish public institution for asylum seekers

Coordinates: 55°52′21″N 12°24′00″E

Entrance to Sandholm

Center Sandholm, or Sandholm, is a public institution for asylum seekers in Denmark. It is located in Sandholm, Blovstrød, Allerød Kommune. Children and young people under 18 who have fled alone are received at Center Gribskov. It is a former military barracks and the largest reception center for asylum seekers in Denmark. The center's daily operations are run by the Danish Red Cross. It also serves as both a receiving and departure center, for newly arrived asylum seekers, and asylum seekers who have been rejected; however, this later group will eventually be moved over to the Sjælsmark deportation camp. Separated from the Red Cross facility, Sandholm also offers a branch of the Immigration Service, the National Police Immigration Department, and Ellebæk, a penal institutions for detained asylum seekers.

== History ==
The barracks in Sandholm were designed by the Danish architect Viggo A. Thalbitzer, and listed as significant, along with many other army barracks in Zealand, after the Act of 1909. In 1945, German refugees were held in the camp under supervision until their transfer. From 1945–85, it housed the Danish Royal Life Guards. On October 1, 1989, it was taken over by the Danish Prison service, who got the right to use the first buildings in the Sandholm camp for asylum seekers. The camp belonged to the Copenhagen Prisons until 2005. In September 2015 a police officer was stabbed at the center by a Palestinian whose asylum request had been turned down.

== Facilities ==
According to the Red Cross, one of the main tasks of the reception is to create a secure and tranquil environment for asylum seekers who have traveled far and long. "After months on the run, it is typically a meal, a bath, a comforter and a bed to sleep in". Police and the Immigration Service have offices in Center Sandholm and roles are clear. Police handle the registration of new asylum seekers, and the Immigration Service is responsible for examining the asylum application. Meanwhile, the Red Cross takes care of a number of basic humanitarian tasks.

Applicants receive basic information about the asylum process in Denmark - and are offered a medical check. Special attention is paid to the most vulnerable, such as asylum seekers with trauma, victims of torture, families with small children or elderly people with impaired health. Center Sandholm also has a kindergarten, minding children while their parents go to interviews with authorities or resting.

Center Sandholm houses approximately 500 residents. There are three types of accommodation: a building with family rooms and private bathroom, two buildings with 4-person rooms and common bathrooms and toilets in the corridor, and 6 new buildings with double rooms with private bathroom. There are also laundry, cafeteria, health clinic, residents' phones and various tenant-led activities, such as sewing, an info cafe, a women's group and bicycle workshop. Residents can either eat in the center's cafeteria, or receive money so they may cook for themselves.

Asylum seekers are offered a short course in Danish and knowledge of Denmark for everyday use, which are taught in the center.

School age children go to the Danish Red Cross' school in Lynge, or the local public schools. The Center Sandholm also has a playgroup and smaller club for older children.

== Demonstration ==
On October 25, 2008, a group approx. 1,500 protesters marched from the Allerød train station to Sandholm in protest under the slogan Luk Lejren ("Close the Camp"), of which 46 were arrested.

They claim to have followed police directions, and that the police reacted with unnecessary violence. It is clear that there were around 200 police sent to protect the center, who erected plastic barricades at some distance from it to prevent access. They fired teargas at protesters, which drifted back into the center. Protesters also claim that the police ran into them with their vehicles. The inner fence was breached in several places and the protesters deemed the protest a symbolic success.

Other reports suggest that part of group, at least, were violent and provoked the police in order to distract attention from a smaller group who caused damage to the inner wire fence. This was signaled with purple plumes, and it was called into by megaphones to follow these plumes to the illegal part of the demonstration.

The police have denied the accusations of excessive violence and say that the tear gas was appropriate in the situation, and that they were attacked by demonstrators.

=== Criticism of demonstration ===
An asylum seeker in Sandholm appealed through a Facebook group for the action to be called off because most residents were worried and had come to Denmark to seek protection from war and violence. Centerleder Chemnitz from the Danish Red Cross said that the residents were insecure, especially families with children. Families were therefore offered to stay elsewhere, while the demonstration took place.

Youth Red Cross called on the people behind the Action Close camp to engage in asylum policy by volunteering in asylum centers, a spokesman for the Action Close camp rejected this idea.

Critics have noted that residents in the Sandholm camp are free to move in and out through the gate, so there should be no reason to cut a hole in the fence. Port Control prevents the unauthorized entry of outsiders only, to guard against drugs and prostitution.

=== Sabotage against the S-Train ===
The demonstration was two hours late because of vandalism of the S-train from Copenhagen. A signal cable at Lyngby Station was cut at approx. 10:45am, which resulted in the shutdown of the commuter train for several hours. A right-wing group who called themselves "Train Time" took responsibility for this action. They published a press release on the Nazi website DNF:

"We have chosen to prevent and delay as many protesters as possible from reaching the refugee camp Saturday 25 10 08. To achieve this, we have decided to dismantle the safety features on the S-train line between Copenhagen. And Hillerød. The cables for signaling and telecommunications were clipped at about 1045."

It is not known if any charges have been laid.
