= Lynge-Kronborg Herred =

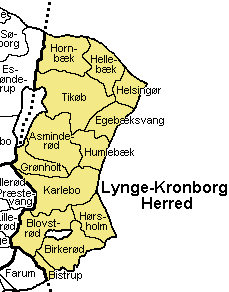
Lynge-Kronborg Herred

Lynge-Kronborg Herred (Lynge-Kronborg Herred Hundred) was an administrative division in Frederiksborg County in the northern part of the island of Zealand, Denmark. It was created when Lynge Herred was divided into Lynge-Kronborg Herred and Lynge-Frederiksborg Herred around 1562, and disappeared with the adoption of the Administration of Justice Act (Retsplejeloven) in 1919. The only market town in Lynge-Kronborg Herred was Helsingør.

== Parishes ==
The following present-day parishes are located in the former Lynge-KronborgHerred:

- Asminderød Parish
- Birkerød Parish
- Bistrup Parish
- Blovstrød Parish
- Egebæksvang Parish
- Grønholt Parish
- Gurre Parish
- Hellebæk Parish
- Hornbæk Parish
- Humlebæk Parish
- Hørsholm Parish
- Karlebo Parish
- Kokkedal Parish (not shown on the map)
- Mørdrup Parish (not shown on the map)
- Tungsted Parish (not shown on the map)
- St Mary's Parish (not shown on the map)
- St Olai's Parish (not shown on the map)
- Sthens Sogn (Ej vist på kort)
- Tikøb Parish
- Vestervang Parish (Ej vist på kort)

== See also ==
- Hundreds of Denmark
