= Lynge-Frederiksborg Herred =

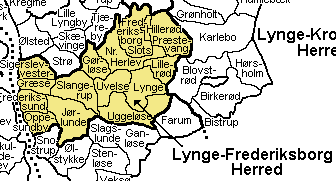
Holbo Herred

Lynge-Frederiksborg Herred (Lynge-Frederiksborg Herred Hundred) was an administrative division in Frederiksborg County in the northern part of the island of Zealand, Denmark. It was created when Lynge Herred was divided into Lynge-Frederiksborg Herred and Lynge-Kronborg Herred in 1562, and disappeared with the adoption of the Administration of Justice Act (Retsplejeloven) in 1919. The market towns in Lynge-Frederiksborg Herred were Hillerød and Frederikssund.

== Parishes ==
The following present-day parishes are located in the former Lynge-Frederiksborg Herred:

- Frederiksborg Castle Parish
- Frederikssund Parish
- Græse Parish
- Gørløse Parish
- Hillerød Parish
- Islebjerg Sogn (not shown on the map)
- Jørlunde Parish
- Lillerød Parish
- Lynge Parish
- Nørre Herlev Parish
- Oppe Sundby Parish
- Præstevang Parish
- Sigerslevvester Parish
- Slangerup Parish
- Uggeløse Parish
- Ullerød Parish (not shown on the map)
- Uvelse Parish

== See also ==
- Hundreds of Denmark
