= Lillerød Church =

Coordinates: 55°52′25″N 12°20′45″E

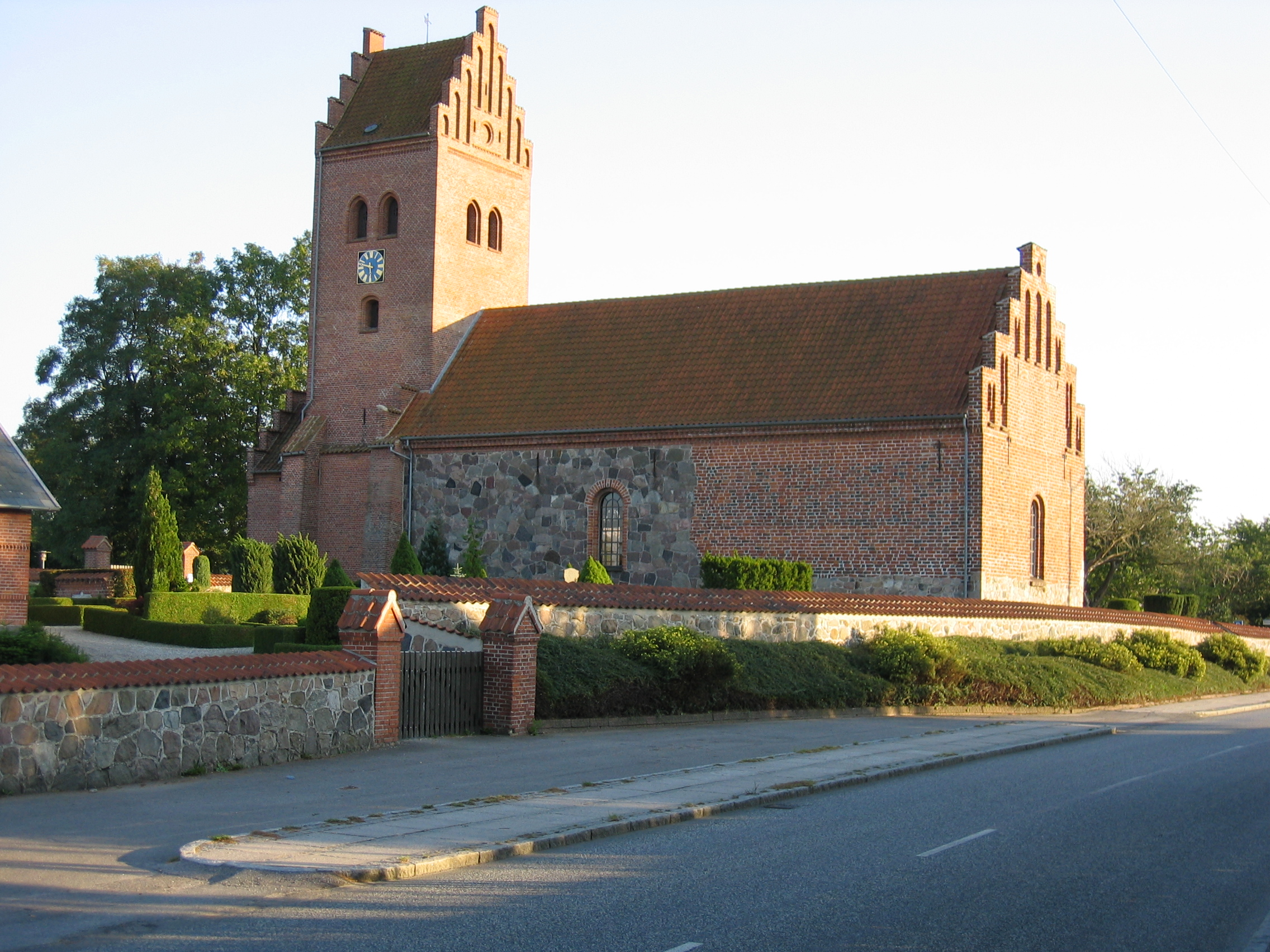
Lillerød Kirke

Lillerød Church (Danish: Lillerød Kirke) is a parish church in Lillerød, Allerød Municipality, some 20 km north of central Copenhagen, Denmark.

== History and architecture ==
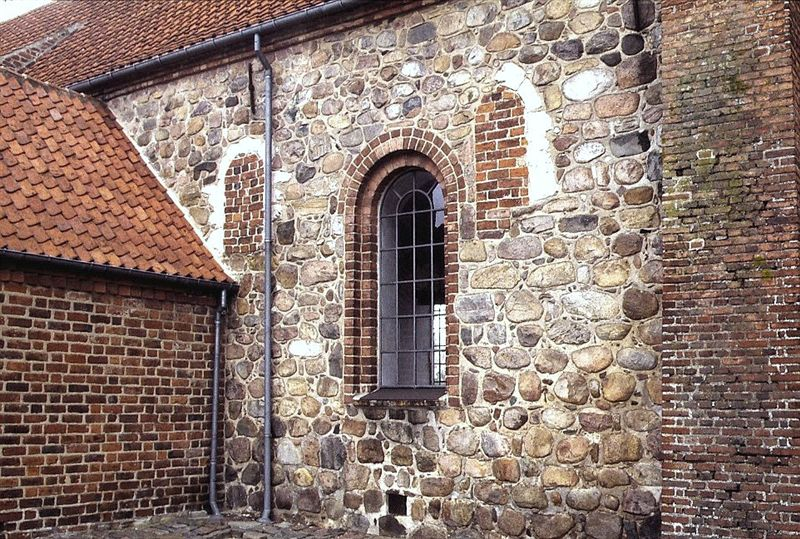
Stone and brick

Built in the Romanesque period, the church initially consisted of chancel and nave constructed in stone with the use of stone ashlars at the corners. In the Gothic period, the nave was extended westwards. The lower part of the extension is constructed in stone from the original church while the upper part is built of brick. The crow-stepped west gable has arched niches. A porch was at the same time added on the west side of the church. The tower was built on top of the chancel in 1859 and heightened in 1906.

== Interior ==
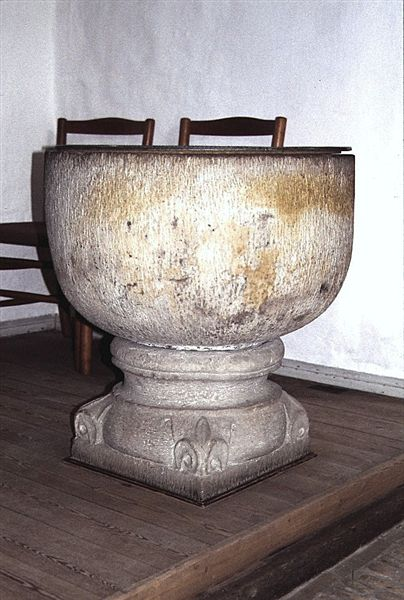
Font

The original flat ceiling of the chancel and nave was in the Gothic period replaced with a cross-vaulted ceiling. The altarpiece is a painting by J. L. G.Lund from the middle of the 19th century. The Baroque style pulpit was created by Hans Snedker in 1631. The altar and chancel was refurbished by Mogens Koch in 1952. The font is from Scania and made of sandstone.

== Churchyard ==
Notable burials in the churchyard include:

- Herluf Bidstrup (1912–1988), illustrator
- Arne Hartmann (1916–2006), writer
- Aage Haugland (1944–2000), singer
- F.P. Jac (1955–2008), poet
- Karl Schrøder (1870–1943), painter and ceramist
