= Nymølle, Allerød Municipality =

Nymølle
- Hamlet
- Location within Denmark
- Coordinates: 55°49′31″N 12°18′08″E
- Country: Denmark
- Region: Capital Region
- Municipality: Allerød

Population (2026)
  - Total: 357
- Time zone: UTC+1 (GMT)
- Postal code: 3540 Lynge

Nymølle is a village in the Parish of Uggeløse, Allerød Municipality, located approximately 28 km north of Copenhagen, Denmark. It is located three kilometres east of Lynge-Uggeløse and five kilometres west of Farum.

== History ==
The name refers to a new windmill which was built at the site. The hamlet was located close to the old village of Vassingerød. The new, private Copenhagen-Slangerup Railway had a station in Vassingerød when in opened in 1906 but the station closed when the section from Farum to Slangerup was decommissioned in 1954.

The extraction of natural resources, gravel and chalk, has played an important role in the local economy but the Vassingerød-Nymølle area has always been sparsely populated and has locally been referred to as "Sibiria". In 1993, a plan was launched for the conversion of a former gravel pit at Nymølle into a recreational area.

The population of Vassingerød passed under 200, making it disappear from Statistics Denmark's official statistics of "urban areas" (byområder) in Denmark. In 2009, Nymølle's population passed 200 for the first time. As of 1 January 2020, Nymølle had a population of 350.
