= Rexton =

Rexton may refer to:

- Rexton, New Brunswick, Canada
- KGM Rexton, a sport utility vehicle manufactured by KG Mobility
- A hearing aid brand manufactured by WS Audiology

== See also ==
- Port Rexton
