= Mungo Park (theatre) =

Theatre in Allerød, Denmark

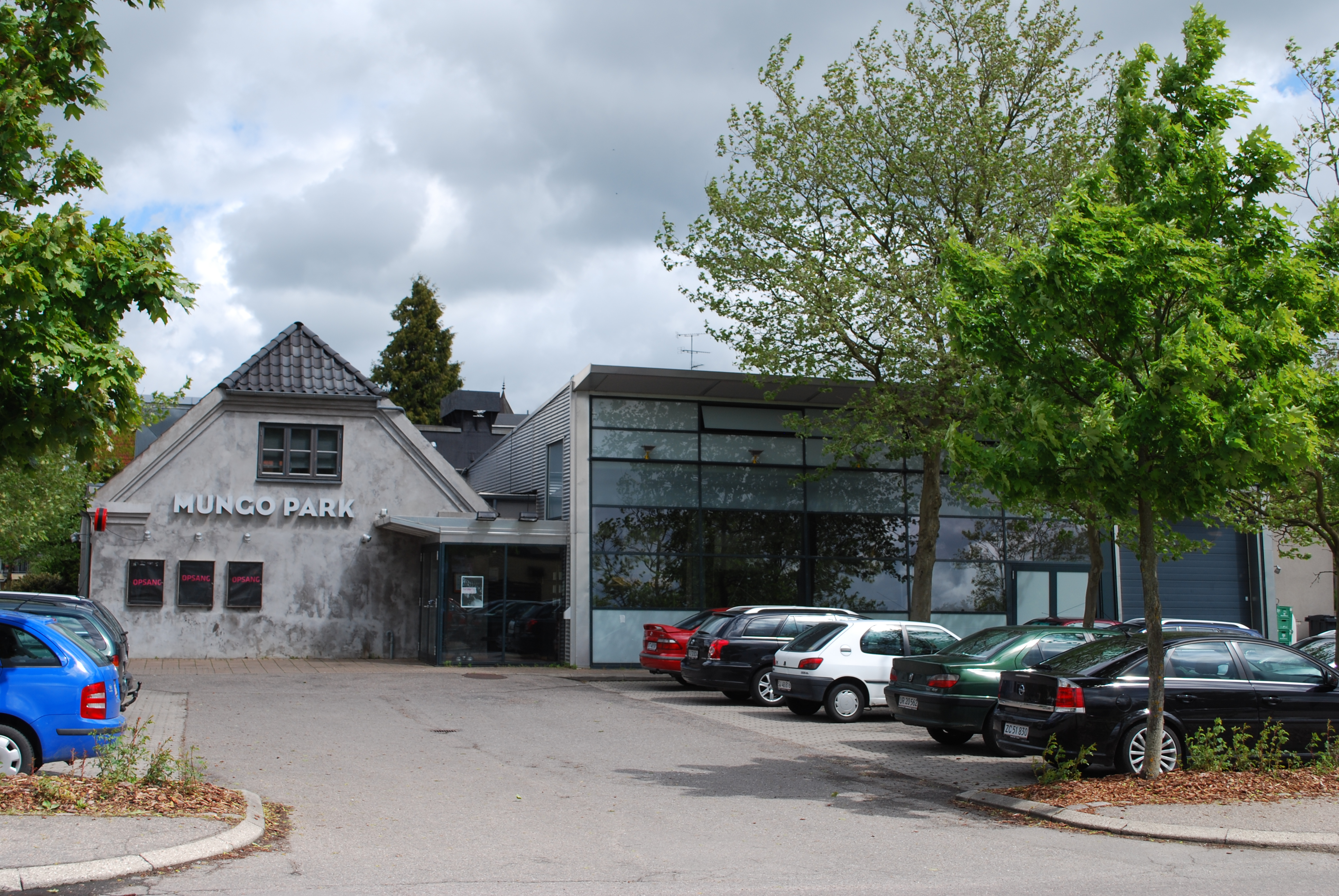

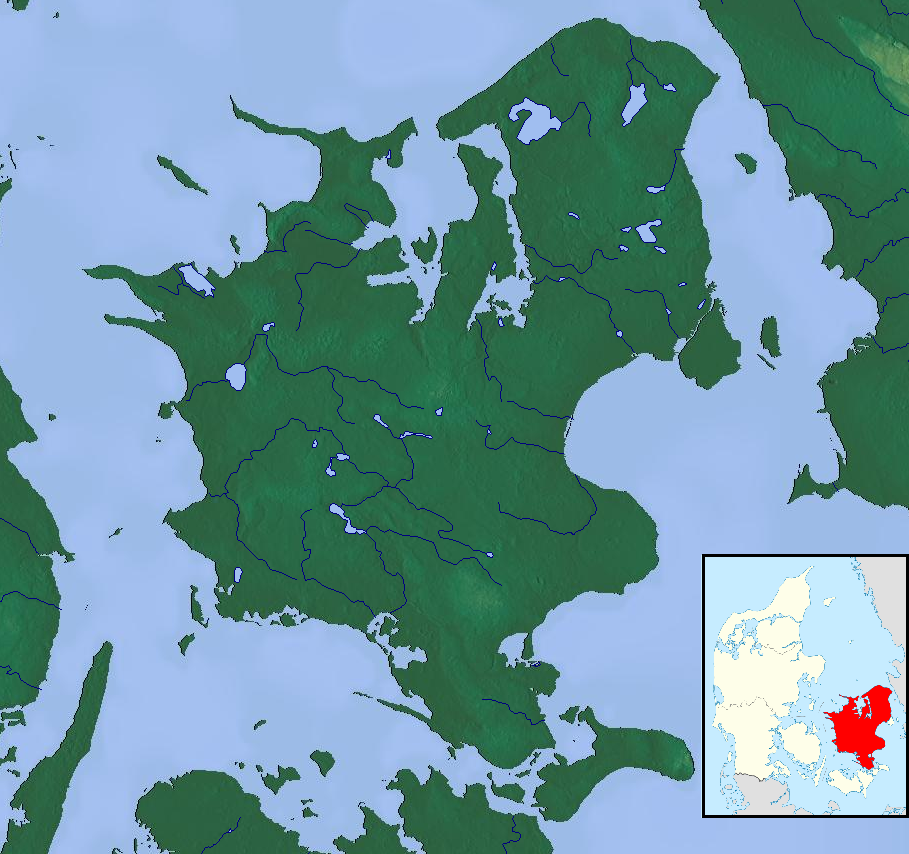
- Location within Zealand
- Interactive map of Mungo Park
- Former names: Dr Dante
- Address: Fritz Hansens Vej 23; Lillerød, Allerød Municipality; Denmark
- Coordinates: 55°52′33″N 12°21′36″E
- Capacity: 172 seats
- Type: Theatre
- Public transit: Allerød railway station S-train line A
- Parking: 60 spaces

Construction
- Built: 2022 (new building)
- Years active: 1985–present
- Architects: Christensen & Co. Architects

Website
- mungopark.dk

Mungo Park is a Danish theatre in Allerød, 35 kilometers north of Copenhagen. Founded in 1985 under the name Dr Dante, it got its present name in 1992. It has been a sandbox for talent and has been important in the development of modern Danish theatre.

== See also ==
- Imperial Theater, Copenhagen
- Lille Grönnegade Theatre
