= Martin Andersen (footballer) =

Danish footballer (born 1986)

Personal information
- Date of birth: November 7, 1986 (age 40)
- Place of birth: Lillerød, Denmark
- Height: 1.79 m (5 ft 10 1/2 in)
- Position: Midfielder

Team information
- Current team: Hørsholm-Usserød
- Number: 8

Youth career
- Lillerød
- Grenaa
- Hillerød GI
- Brabrand

Senior career*
Years	Team	Apps	(Gls)
–2006	Brabrand		
2006–2009	Lyngby	5	(0)
2009–2014	Ängelholm	121	(20)
2014–2015	Lyngby	35	(5)
2015–2017	Roskilde	42	(4)
2017–2020	HIK	93	(9)
2020–	Hørsholm-Usserød		
- * Club domestic league appearances and goals

Martin Andersen (born 7 November 1986) is a Danish retired professional football (soccer) midfielder.

== Later career ==
After leaving HIK in the summer 2020, Andersen began playing for Denmark Series club Hørsholm-Usserød. In February 2022, he was also hired as the club's sponsorship manager alongside his work as a player.
