= Morten Voldby Olsen =

Danish footballer (born 1998)

Morten Olsen
Personal information
- Full name: Morten Voldby Olsen
- Date of birth: 30 August 1998 (age 28)
- Place of birth: Lynge, Denmark
- Position: Forward

Team information
- Current team: Brønshøj
- Number: 9

Youth career
- Allerød
- Farum
- Lyngby
- Farum

Senior career*
Years	Team	Apps	(Gls)
2020–2021	Hillerød	0	(0)
2021–2022	Allerød		
2022–2024	Hvidovre	10	(0)
2024	→ HIK (loan)	16	(2)
2024–2025	HIK	21	(4)
2025–2026	Holbæk B&I	27	(13)
2026–	Brønshøj	10	(5)
- * Club domestic league appearances and goals as of 4 October 2026

Morten Voldby Olsen (born 30 August 1998) is a Danish footballer who plays as a forward for Danish 3rd Division side Brønshøj.

== Career ==
Born and raised in Lynge, Olsen played for several North Zealand clubs in his youth; Allerød FK, Lyngby Boldklub and Farum BK in two rounds.

After playing a bit for Farum BK, FC Nordsjælland's reserve team, Olsen moved ahead of the 2020–21 season to Hillerød Fodbold, who played in the Danish 2nd Division. Here he never made the breakthrough to divisional football, but managed to make his official debut for the club in a cup match against Vanløse IF in September 2020, where Olsen also got on the scoreboard. Olsen spent the rest of his time at the club on Hillerød's reserve team.

Prior to the 2021–22 season, Olsen switched back to his childhood club, Allerød FK, who played in the Denmark Series Pool 1.

Ahead of the 2022–23 season, Olsen was acquired by Danish 1st Division side Hvidovre IF, where he signed a 2-year deal. In the 2022–23 season, Olsen played 197 minutes over 9 games, contributing to Hvidovre's promotion to the 2023-24 Danish Superliga. On 18 August 2023, Olsen made his debut in the top Danish league in a match against F.C. Copenhagen. This was his only appearance for Hvidovre in the first half of the season.

In pursuit of more playing time, on 16 January 2024, Olsen was loaned out to Danish 2nd Division side HIK until the end of the season. At the end of May 2024, Hvidovre confirmed that Olsen's contract with the club, which was due to expire on 30 June 2024, wouldn't be extended. Ahead of the 2024–25 season, Olsen moved to HIK permanently.

In July 2025, Olsen moved to Danish 3rd Division club Holbæk B&I.

On 13 July 2026, Olsen joined fellow Danish 3rd Division side Brønshøj Boldklub on one-year contract.
