= Widex =

Danish hearing aid manufacturer

Widex A/S
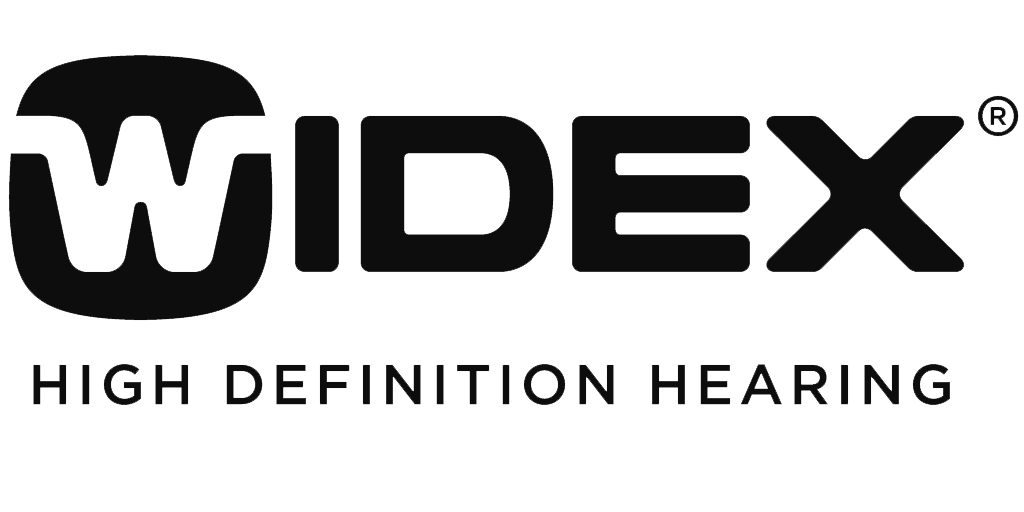
- Company type: Family-owned Aktieselskab
- Industry: Health care
- Founded: 1956
- Founder: Christian Tøpholm
- Headquarters: Lynge, Denmark
- Key people: Jan Makela (CEO)
- Products: Hearing aids
- Number of employees: 3,800 (2014)
- Website: www.widex.com

Widex A/S is the world’s sixth largest hearing aid manufacturer. In close collaboration with international audiological researchers and specialists, the company has developed a wide range of digital hearing aids. They introduced the world's first commercially available 100% digital in-the-ear hearing aid in 1995 based on the research model developed by Oticon that same year.

== History ==
The Danish company was founded in 1956 by the Tøpholm and Westermann families, and is still owned by the relatives of the company’s original founders. The CEO of Widex is Jan Makela, who was appointed in July 2024. Widex hearing aids are sold in almost 100 countries and the company employs approximately 3,800 people around the world.

Widex’s new headquarters are located in Allerød Municipality, Denmark, north of Copenhagen. The new headquarters use groundwater for cooling in the summer and heating in the winter. Widex also placed an energy-generating wind turbine beside the building.

In 2018, Widex and Sivantos (which owns Signia, Rexton, TruHearing, Audibene, HearUSA and Hear.com) announced an $8B merger, creating the 3rd largest hearing conglomerate in the world. Widex also launched its newest product, Widex Evoke, which is the first hearing aid to incorporate machine learning technology.

Since March 1, 2019 Widex has been part of WS Audiology, a company formed that day through the combination of Singapore-headquartered former Siemens owned (until 2015) Sivantos with Lynge/Denmark-based Widex.

In 2020 Widex introduced the smallest (RIC) rechargeable lithium-ion hearing aid on the market: Widex Moment.

== See also ==
- Hearing impairment
