= Matas (drug store) =

Danish business

Matas A/S
- Company type: Publicly traded Aktieselskab
- Traded as: Nasdaq Copenhagen: MATAS
- Genre: Drug store chain
- Founded: 1949
- Headquarters: Allerød, Denmark
- Products: pharmaceuticals, parfume, cosmetics
- Revenue: kr 4.3 billion
- Net income: 3,078,000,000 Danish krone
- Total assets: 8,668,000,000 Danish krone (2024)
- Number of employees: ~2500
- Website: www.matas.dk, www.matas.se, www.matas.no

Matas is a Danish business, founded in 1949, that operates a chain of drug stores across Denmark. The store's motto is "Good Advice Makes the Difference". The chain consists of 263 stores, employs approximately 2,500 people and has an annual revenue of approximately 4.3 billion kr (About US$630 million). Matas also sells personal hygiene products and other home goods. The main types of merchandise sold in stores are make-up products and cosmetics, such as hair colouring, lipsticks and rouge. In addition, most, if not all, Matas shops have a chemical department, where one can find both household chemicals and more rare and exotic chemicals for home chemists, in accordance to the drysalter roots of the store. Other things sold by the retailer include: vitamin supplements, herbal remedies (such as ginseng extracts), and liquorice root.

== History ==
The name Matas is a contraction of Materialisternes Aktieselskab. While the concept of a drysalter/drugstore type shop dates back to the 18th century, the company was founded November 13, 1949, with an investment of 14,000 Danish kroner. (about 1500-1800 USD at the time.) After the first fiscal year, the company ended with a deficit of kr 24.50, or only US$3. That is still the only deficit in the history of the company.

In 1951, Matas decided to rebel against the "Apotekermonopolet" (English: "The Drugstore Monopoly") which was a law dating back to 1929. This law stated that only pharmacies could sell any form of drugs or vitamin supplements. As a result, Matas began to sell tablets of vitamin C, but the police took up the case. The case received some media coverage, but ultimately the selling of vitamins was deemed illegal. Matas filed a lawsuit, and after six years it was found that at least 38 of the vitamin supplements being sold in pharmacies and drugstores were dietary supplements, not medicinal drugs.

Matas began to manufacture its own line of products under the "Matas" brand. In 1956, Matas presented its first logo, and in the year after, the company began to work together with the Steins Laboratory. A set of rules regarding the quality of Matas products were also made. In 1958, the first Matas advertising paper was printed. The paper had an initial circulation of 700,000 copies, which at the time was over four times as much as the largest national newspaper.

Between 1967 and 1988, there were new products, sub-brands, and a different color theme (blue and white), which is still a major component in the design of the shop interiors and exteriors. In 1967 there were 150 stores in Denmark, and in 1974 just under 200. In 1989 Matas celebrated its 40-year anniversary and received various awards, including "MMM-Prisen" and "Årets Guldkorn".

In 1994 Matas Miljøfund (English: Matas Environmental Fund) was founded, and in 1997 Matas moved its main administration from Farum to Allerød. In 1999, Matas celebrated its 50-year anniversary with the opening of two new stores in Malmö. In 2001 some Danish laws regarding sales of over-the-counter drugs were changed, and Matas started offering a variety of these types of products. In 2006, Matas' 292 store was opened, before, in May, Matas was sold for 5.2 billion Danish kroner (near US$900 million) to the investment company CVC Capital Partners.

== Campaigns ==
In 2007 Matas started a campaign in collaboration with Hjerteforeningen (English: The Heart Association)—a private Danish association that undertakes research on cardiovascular disease, heart disease prevention and patient support. Central to the campaign was a commitment to donate one Danish krone to Hjerteforeningen for every item sold from the Matas skincare series, "Plaisir". The campaign was called "Elsk Hjertet" (English: "Love the heart") and was scheduled to run until 2012.

== Controversies ==
During the years, Matas has been forced to stop selling various chemicals since they were being purchased and used to create improvised explosive devices, especially around New Year's Eve. Among these chemicals are potassium nitrate and potassium permanganate, which are both strong oxidising agents. By 2008 potassium permanganate are again being sold in some Matas shops, albeit under a different brand.

In 2011 the company was involved in a conflict with the Danish pharmacy industry, as it campaigned for the right to dispense prescription-only medication. Danish pharmacists responded with a claim that Matas was under pressure from investors who were primarily concerned with profit-generation.
