= WS Audiology =

Manufacturer of hearing aids

- Type: Private
- Industry: Hearing instruments
- Founded: 2019
- Headquarters: Lynge, Denmark; Singapore
- Key people: Jan Makela, CEO (since July 2024)
- Revenue: ▲€2.63 billion (fiscal year 2023-24)
- Number of employees: ▲ ~12,600
- Website: www.wsa.com

WS Audiology (formerly Sivantos Group and Widex) is a Danish manufacturer of hearing aids with headquarters in Lynge, Denmark and Singapore with roots going back to 1878 and Siemens AG. The current company was created following the 2019 merger of Sivantos Group and Widex. Prior to that, Sivantos was spun off from Siemens after Siemens AG sold the company to EQT and Santo Holding in 2015. WS Audiology employs about 12,600 people in more than 125 countries. In fiscal year 2023-2024, the company generated revenue of €2.63 billion and adjusted EBITDA of €542 million.

The company develops, manufactures, sells and distributes hearing aids under the following brands: A&M, audibene, Audio Service, Bloom, Coselgi, hear.com, HearUSA, Lifestyle Hearing Network, Rexton, Signia, Shoebox, TruHearing, Widex and Widex Hearing Specialists.

== History ==
In 1878, Werner von Siemens built a telephone with a horseshoe magnet, which amplified and improved voice signal quality. In 1913, Siemens introduced the first industrially produced hearing instrument, the Esha-Phonophor.

During the 1950s, Christian Tøpholm and Erik Westermann formed Widex and began developing hearing devices in Tøpholm's converted cellar. In 1956, the company produced its first model, the Widex 561. In 1959 Siemens developed the Auriculette, a behind-the-ear (BTE) device with small lightweight components that fit together in a single unit. In 1966, they developed their first device worn entirely in-the-ear (ITE), the Siretta 339.

In 1988, Widex produced the first digitally-programmable hearing aid with a remote control, the Quattro Q8. In 1995, Widex created Senso, the first fully digital unit that fits completely in the ear. In 2004, the company created the world's first hearing aid in which right and left devices were synchronized and in 2008, the world's smallest receiver-in-canal hearing aid.

In 2015, Swedish private equity firm EQT bought Siemens Audiology Solutions for more than 2 billion euros and renamed the company Sivantos.

Sivantos Group joined the UN Global Compact Initiative in 2017 and began to streamline its social activities and CSR policy. The company's first Communication on Progress, the annual report to the office of the UN Secretary General, was published on 24 May 2018.

In 2018, Widex and Sivantos announced an $8B merger, creating the 3rd largest hearing conglomerate in the world. The combined company changed its name to WS Audiology in 2019.

== Management ==
WS Audiology is led by CEO Jan Makela, who took over from CEO Eric Bernard in July 2024.

== Brands ==
The company develops, manufactures, sells and distributes hearing aids under the following brands: A&M, audibene, Audio Service, Bloom, Coselgi, hear.com, HearUSA, Lifestyle Hearing Network, Rexton, Signia, SHOEBOX, TruHearing, Widex and Widex Hearing Specialists.

=== hear.com / audibene ===
hear.com and its European brand audibene provide online hearing care through a network of 5,000 independent partner audiologists and 1,000 hearing care experts. The company was founded in 2012 by Dr. Marco Vietor and Paul Crusius. In 2015, the company and Sivantos Group entered into a strategic partnership and investment agreement. The agreement defined that Dr. Marco Vietor and Paul Crusius will become part of the Sivantos management and continue to lead to hear.com (in Europe audibene) business, as well as support the company in its further international expansion efforts. In 2019, the company generated $150 million in revenue. In 2020, the company was reorganized as hear.com NV, however keeping the brand audibene in Europe.
