= Sandholm =

Danish estate

Sandholmsgård
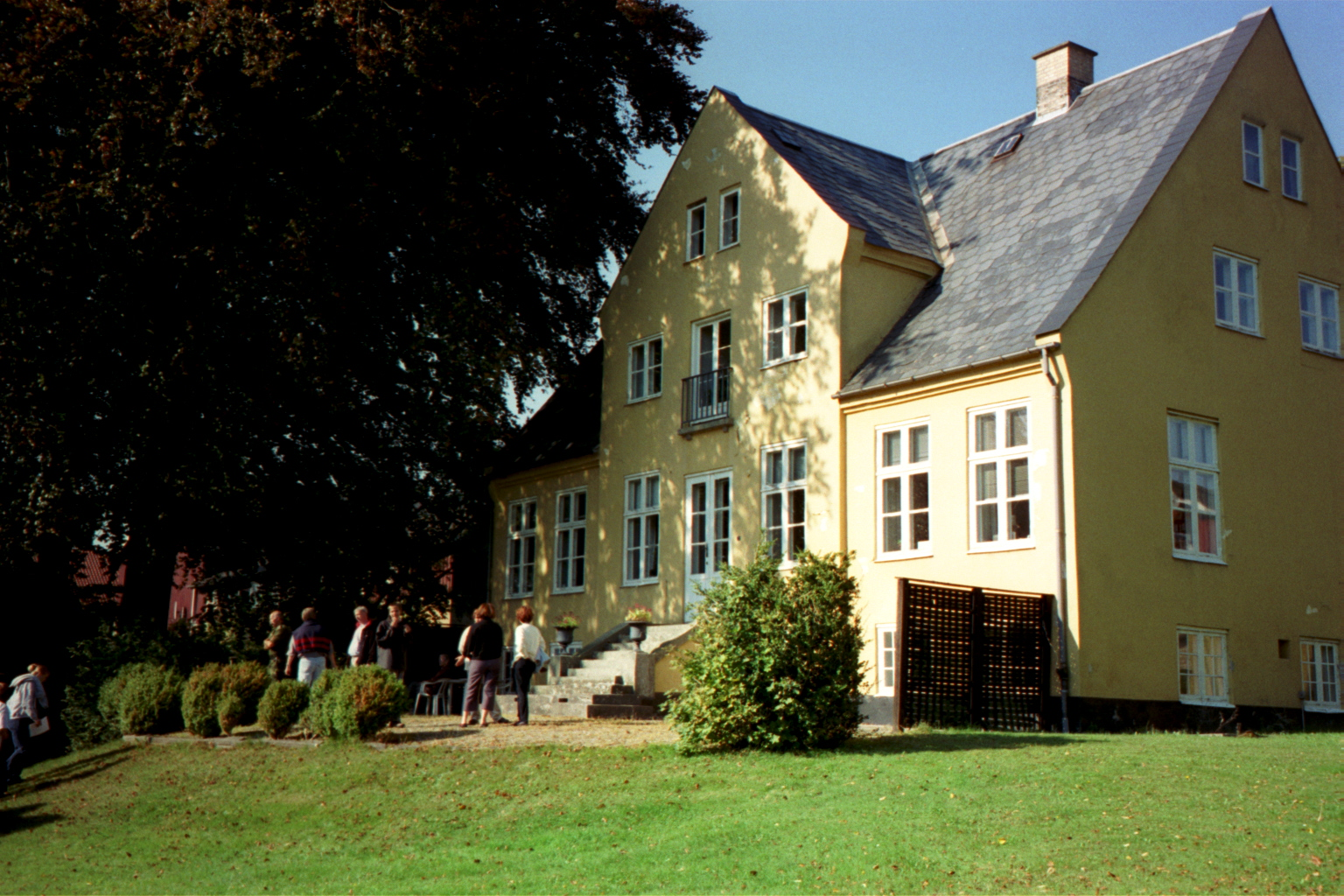

General information
- Location: Blovstrød, Denmark
- Coordinates: 55°52′12″N 12°24′13.8″E
- Completed: 1749

Design and construction
- Architect: Lauritz de Thurah

Sandholm is an estate in the parish of Blovstrød, Allerød Municipality, some 30 km (19 mi) north of Copenhagen, Denmark.

== History ==
The Sandholm estate traces its history back to 1653 when Captain Christian Vendelboe constructed a house at the site. He served at Slotsholmen during the Assault on Copenhagen on 19–11 February 1769 and died in the first half of 1660. Sandholm was then passed to his brother, Markus Vendelbo, who was a captain in the same regiment. He was shortly thereafter sentenced to death by sword by a court martial but pardoned on condition that he left the country never to return. In 1661, Sandholm was ceded to Lorenz Tuxen, Bailiff of Hørsholm County. In 1680, Queen Downer Sophie Amalie granted Sandholm to her bodyguard Casper Eberhard Meyer with freedom from all taxes. When Meyer was sent to Lolland to serve as game master (vildtmester), following Sophie Amalie's death, he obtained royal permission to sell Sandholm. The estate was in 1696 acquired by Søster Svane, Bishop Hans Bagger's widow, who owned in until 1698. Later owners included rittmeister Mathias Mohr and Supreme Court justice Bertel Bjørnsen who sold it in 1708 for 3,000 Danish rigsdaler to king Frederick IV.

In 1743, the king ceded Sandholm to royal architect Lauritz de Thurah and his wife Anna Rosenørn for life. De Thurah replaced the main building with a new house and improved one of the other buildings in 1749. He also redesigned the gardens and park and praised the environs for their beauty but when his wife died the following year he chose to rent out the house to the historian and book collector Henrik Hielmstierne.

In 1761, Sandholm was sold at public auction to Queen Sophie Magdalene's court pastor Johan Andreas Cramer, He was an enthusiastic farmer and the first in the area to grow potatoes. Cramer sold the property in 1771 and it then changed hands many times. The courtier Vilhelm Henrik Harbou owned it from 1816 to 1823.

The house was destroyed in a fire in 1834 but was later rebuilt. The military Sandholm Camp was established close to the house in 1910–1912 and the Ministry of Defence acquired the house and gardens in 1949. It was subsequently used by the Royal Danish Life Guards.
