= Hundreds of Denmark =

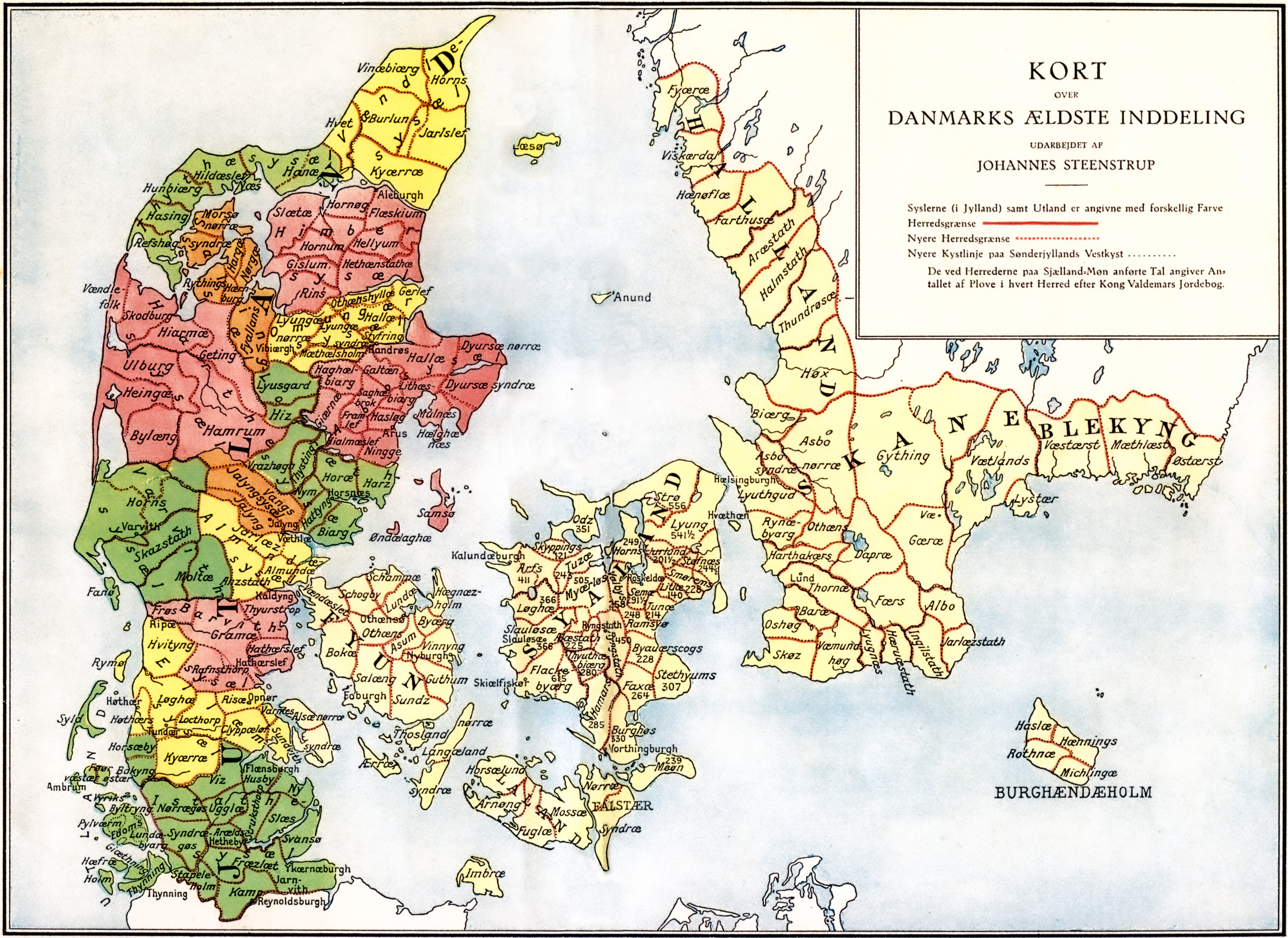
Administrative division of Denmark in Medieval times

In the period preceding the Municipal Reform of 1970, Denmark was divided into around 170 hundreds (Danish: herred, plural: herreder). In the timeframe 1793 through 1970, each parish was functioning as a municipality within their respective hundreds. The hundreds were in turn part of a county. This was changed in 1970, when the parishes were merged into larger municipalities sometimes crossing hundred borders, and the hundreds fell out of administrative use.

Today, hundreds are used mostly for purposes of genealogy research.

== Detail ==
Denmark was subdivided into hundreds from the early medieval period until this administrative division was finally abolished as part of the 1970 administrative reform.

Hundreds comprised varying numbers of parishes (Danish: sogn, plural: sogne), and each hundred had its own tingsted (assembly place) where the ting (assembly) was held, serving as court of law in minor affairs (major affairs were decided by the three landsting assemblies, serving as supreme courts in respectively 1) Scania [including Halland, Blekinge and Bornholm], 2) Zealand [including Lolland and Falster] and 3) Jutland and Funen). It has been hypothesised - since an extremely large amount of Denmark's herreder have access to the sea - that the division may have originated in the Viking era, for either offensive or defensive purposes. The subdivision applies to almost all parts of medieval Denmark (see below), including Southern Schleswig, Scania, Halland and Blekinge, but not Rügen.

Jutland (including Southern Schleswig) and most or all of Zealand were divided into syssel divisions (Danish: syssel, plural: sysler), each composed of a number of herreder, which in turn were subdivided into parishes. The syssel division did not apply in other parts of Denmark.

The area between the Danevirke fortifications and the river Eider (originally very sparsely populated) was exceptional in being included into the syssel divisions (as part of Istedsyssel) but was not subdivided into herreder. The area of North Frisian settlement Uthlande, now North Frisia, was subdivided into herreder which in turn were divided into parishes, but this region was not subject to Danish law but to a local Frisian law, and was in the medieval period administered as part of the royal demesne.

When Denmark in the 1660s abolished the former division into fiefs (Len), their replacement, the counties (amt, plural: amter) were similarly based on the herreder which in turn remained subdivided into parishes.

== List ==
Hundred	County
Als Nørre	Sønderborg
Als Sønder	Sønderborg
Alsted	Sorø
Anst	Ribe
Ars	Holbæk
Bjerge	Odense
Bjerre	Vejle
Bjæverskov	Præstø (since 1803)
Bornholms Nørre	Bornholm
Bornholms Sønder	Bornholm
Bornholms Vester	Bornholm
Bornholms Øster	Bornholm
Brusk	Vejle
Bølling	Ringkøbing
Børglum	Hjørring
Båg	Odense
Bårse	Præstø (since 1803)
Djurs Nørre	Randers
Djurs Sønder	Randers
Dronninglund	Hjørring
Elbo	Vejle
Fakse	Præstø (since 1803)
Falsters Nørre	Maribo
Falsters Sønder	Maribo
Fjends	Viborg
Fleskum	Ålborg
Framlev	Århus
Frøs	Haderslev
Fuglse	Maribo
Galten	Randers
Ginding	Ringkøbing
Gislum	Ålborg
Gjerlev	Randers
Gjern	Skanderborg
Gram	Haderslev
Gudme	Svendborg
Gørding	Ribe
Haderslev	Haderslev
Hads	Århus
Hammer	Præstø (since 1803)
Hammerum	Ringkøbing
Harre	Viborg
Hasle	Århus
Hassing	Thisted
Hatting	Vejle
Hellum	Ålborg
Hids	Viborg
Hind	Ringkøbing
Hindborg	Viborg
Hindsted	Ålborg
Hillerslev	Thisted
Hjelmslev	Skanderborg
Hjerm	Ringkøbing
Holbo	Frederiksborg
Holmans	Vejle
Horns	Frederiksborg
Horns	Hjørring
Hornum	Ålborg
Houlbjerg	Viborg
Hundborg	Thisted
Hvetbo	Hjørring
Hviding	Tønder
Jerlev	Vejle
Kær	Ålborg
Langelands Nørre	Svendborg
Langelands Sønder	Svendborg
Lollands Nørre	Maribo
Lollands Sønder	Maribo
Lunde	Odense
Lundtoft	Åbenrå
Lynge-Frederiksborg	Frederiksborg
Lynge-Kronborg	Frederiksborg
Lysgård	Viborg
Læsø	Hjørring
Løve	Holbæk
Malt	Ribe
Merløse	Holbæk
Middelsom	Viborg
Mols	Randers
Morsø Nørre	Thisted
Morsø Sønder	Thisted
Musse	Maribo
Mønbo	Præstø (since 1803)
Nim	Skanderborg
Ning	Århus
Nybøl	Sønderborg
Nørhald	Randers
Nørlyng	Viborg
Nørre	Viborg
Nørre Horne	Ringkøbing
Nørre Rangstrup	Haderslev
Nørre Tyrstrup	Vejle
Nørvang	Vejle
Odense	Odense
Ods	Holbæk
Onsild	Randers
Ramsø	Roskilde (København after 1808)
Refs	Thisted
Ribe	Ribe
Rinds	Viborg
Ringsted	Sorø
Rise	Åbenrå
Rougsø	Randers
Rødding	Viborg
Sabro	Århus
Sallinge	Svendborg
Samsø	Holbæk
Skam	Odense
Skast	Ribe
Skippinge	Holbæk
Skodborg	Ringkøbing
Skovby	Odense
Slagelse	Sorø
Slavs	Ribe
Slet	Ålborg
Slogs	Tønder
Smørum	København
Sokkelund	København
Stevns	Præstø (since 1803)
Strø	Frederiksborg
Støvring	Randers
Sunds	Svendborg
Sømme	Roskilde (København after 1808)
Sønderhald	Randers
Sønderlyng	Viborg
Sønder Rangstrup	Åbenrå
Sønder Tyrstrup	Haderslev
Tune	Roskilde (København after 1808)
Tuse	Holbæk
Tybjerg	Præstø (since 1803)
Tyrsting	Skanderborg
Tønder, Højer og Lø	Tønder
Ulfborg	Ringkøbing
Tørrild	Vejle
Vandfuld	Ringkøbing
Vends	Odense
Vennebjerg	Hjørring
Vester Flakkebjerg	Sorø
Vester Han	Thisted
Vester Horne	Ribe
Vester Lisbjerg	Århus
Vindinge	Svendborg
Voer	Skanderborg
Voldborg	Roskilde (København after 1808)
Vrads	Skanderborg
Ølstykke	Frederiksborg
Øster Flakkebjerg	Sorø
Øster Han	Hjørring
Øster Horne	Ribe
Øster Lisbjerg	Randers
Ærø	Svendborg
Års	Ålborg
Åsum	Odense

== See also ==
- Danish municipal reforms of 1970 and of 2007
- Other administrative units (current or historical) in Denmark, roughly in decreasing order of size:
  - Regions of Denmark
  - Counties of Denmark
  - Municipalities of Denmark
  - Market town#Denmark and Parish (Denmark)
