= Blovstrød =

- Town
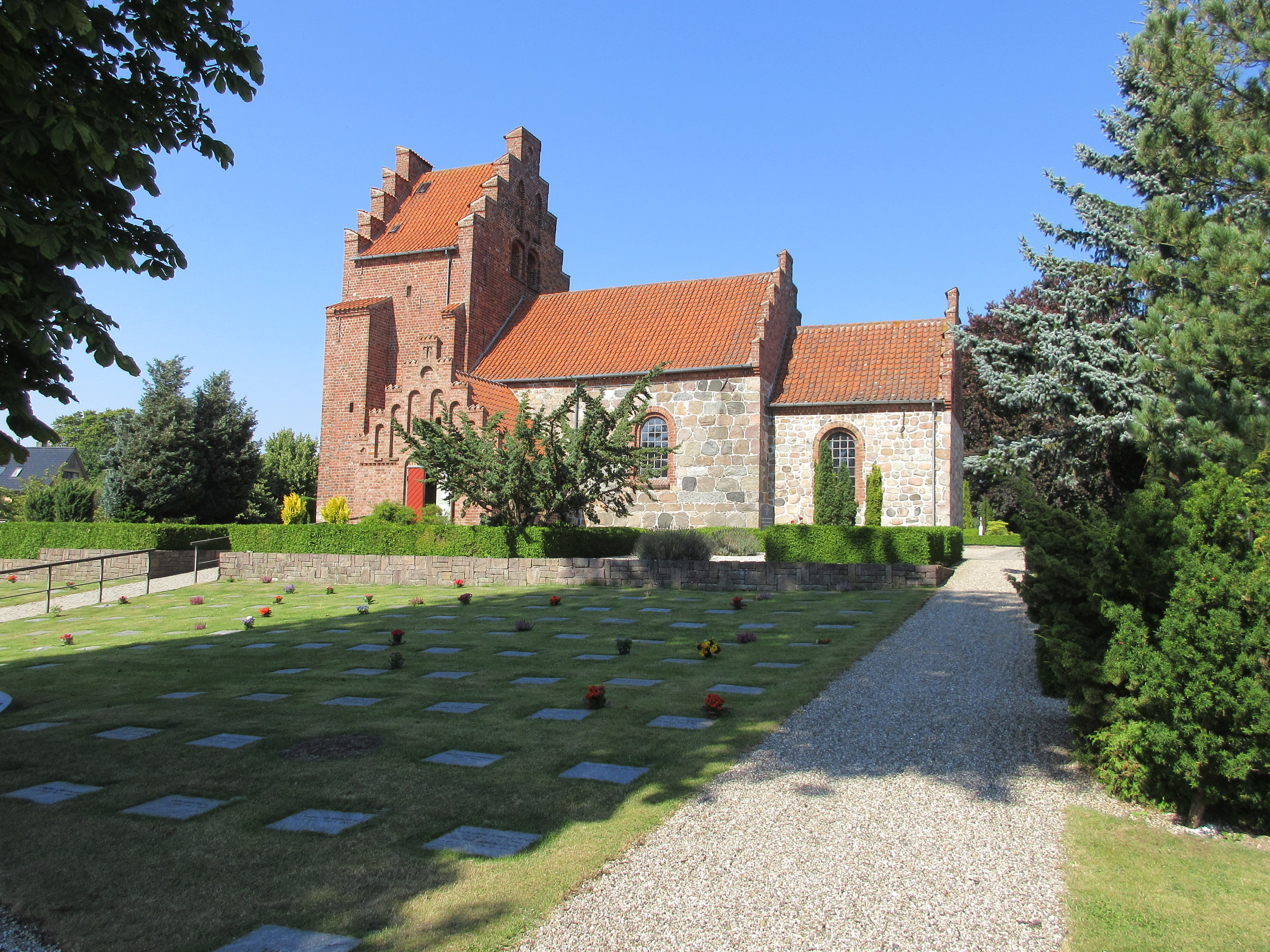
- Blovstrød Church

- Location within Denmark Location within Capital Region
- Coordinates: 55°52′09″N 12°23′05″E
- Country: Denmark
- Region: Capital Region
- Municipality: Allerød

Area
  - Urban: 1.44 km^{2} (0.56 sq mi)

Population (2026)
  - Urban: 3,019
  - Urban density: 2,100/km^{2} (5,430/sq mi)
- Time zone: UTC+1 (GMT)
- Postal code: 3450 Allerød

Blovstrød is a small town and parish in Allerød Municipality, North Zealand, located some 30 km north of Copenhagen, Denmark. The town is situated on the east side of Lyngby Kongevej, approximately one kilometre east of Lillerød and Allerød station. Two new neighbourhoods, Ny Blovstrød and Teglværkskvarteret, are planned on the west side of Lyngby Kongevej.

== History ==
=== Early history ===
Blovstrød is first mentioned in 1265 as Blaustruth. The first part of the name may be derived from the male name Blawæsti' (Sorte-Væsti) while the suffix -rød means "clearing". The area was from the early Middle Ages crown land and in 1700 Blovstrød was one of the parishes that were placed under Hirschholm Palace which was given to Louise of Mecklenburg-Güstrow as her personal property by king Frederick IV. The village was the site of a roadside inn.

=== 19th century ===
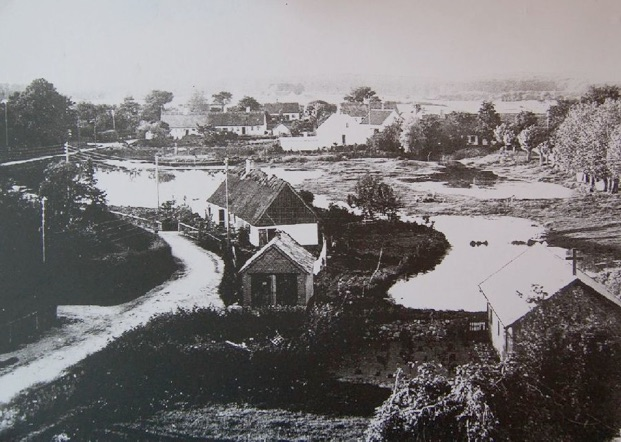
Blovstrød viewed from the church tower in 1916: The village pond consisted of several smaller ponds

Blovstrød Brickyard was established in 1860 and grew to become one of the largest brickyards in Northern Europe. It had an extensive network of industrial railway tracks to several clay pits in the area.

=== 20th century ===
The old school was demolished and a new one was built in 1938. Blovstrød began to grow with new areas of single family detached homes in the 1950s. The western part of the parish, with the town of Blovstrød, became part of Allerød Municipality in the 1970 Danish Municipal Reform while the eastern part of the municipality became part of Hørsholm Municipality. The factory closed in 1982.

== Landmarks ==
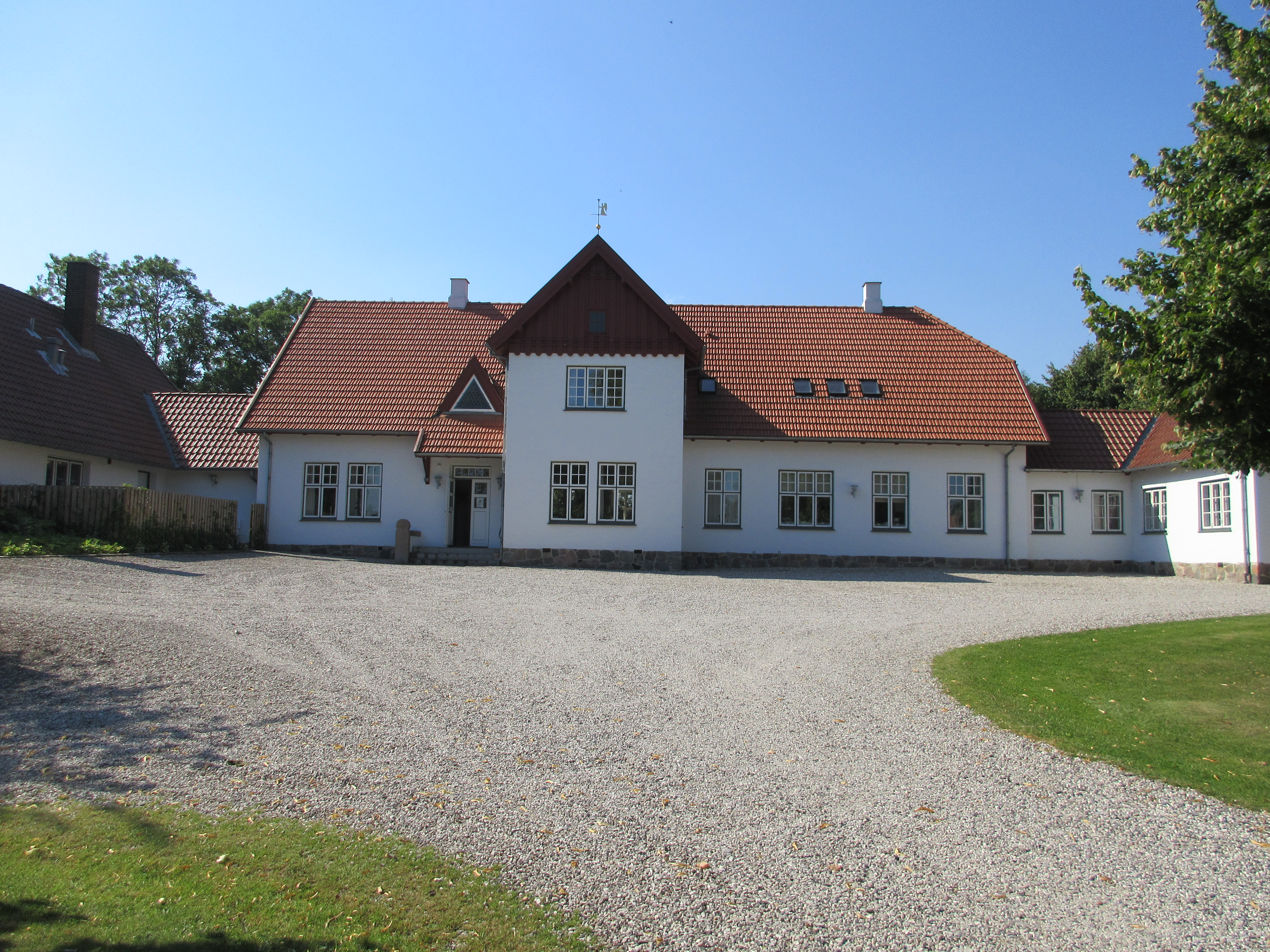
Blovstrød Parish House

Blovstrød Church is a Romanesque ville church. The nave and chancel dates from before 1200. Next to the church is the parish house. Little remains of the original village but the village pond. Blovstrød is home to two primary schools, the public Blovstrød School and the private Allerød Privatskole. The Sandholm estate to the east of Blovstrød has a history that dates back to the 13th century. It is now part of the Høvelte-Sandholm-Sjælsø military grounds. Høvelte Barracks is home to the Royal Danish Life Guards.

Local retail includes a Netto store, a REMA 1000 and a bakery.

== Development projects ==
A district plan for a new neighbourhood on the west side of Kongevejen was adopted by Allerød Municipal Council in March 2016. It covers an area of approximately 24.4 hectares.

The former brickyard site, located south of Sortedamvej, was part of the Europan 11 programme. The competition was won by Mette Blankenberg and Eyrun Margret Stefansdottir. A district plan for the area was adopted in January 2016. The site covers a total area of approximately 22 hectares of which just under 16 hectares are transferred to "urban zone" and approximately 360 new homes will be built in the area.

== Transport ==
Allerød station is located on the Hillerød radial of the S-train network and is served by the E trains. The distance from Blovstrød to the station is just under two kilometres. A paved and illuminated path, Ejnars Sti, provides a connection for pedestrians and cyclists.

Sandholmgårdsvej connects Blovstrød to Hørsholm and the Helsingør Motorway to the east.

== Notable people ==
- Hans Pilgaard (born 1963) a Danish journalist and television host
- Søren Rasted (born 1969 in Blovstrød) a Danish musician, singer, songwriter and record producer
- Carsten Fredgaard (born 1976 in Blovstrød) a former Danish footballer with over 250 club caps
- Lotte Friis (born 1988 in Blovstrød) a swimmer, bronze medalist in the 800 metre freestyle at the 2008 Summer Olympics
- Julius Johansen (born 1999 in Blovstrød) a Danish professional racing cyclist
