= Allerød Municipality =

Allerød Municipality Allerød Kommune (Danish)
- Municipality
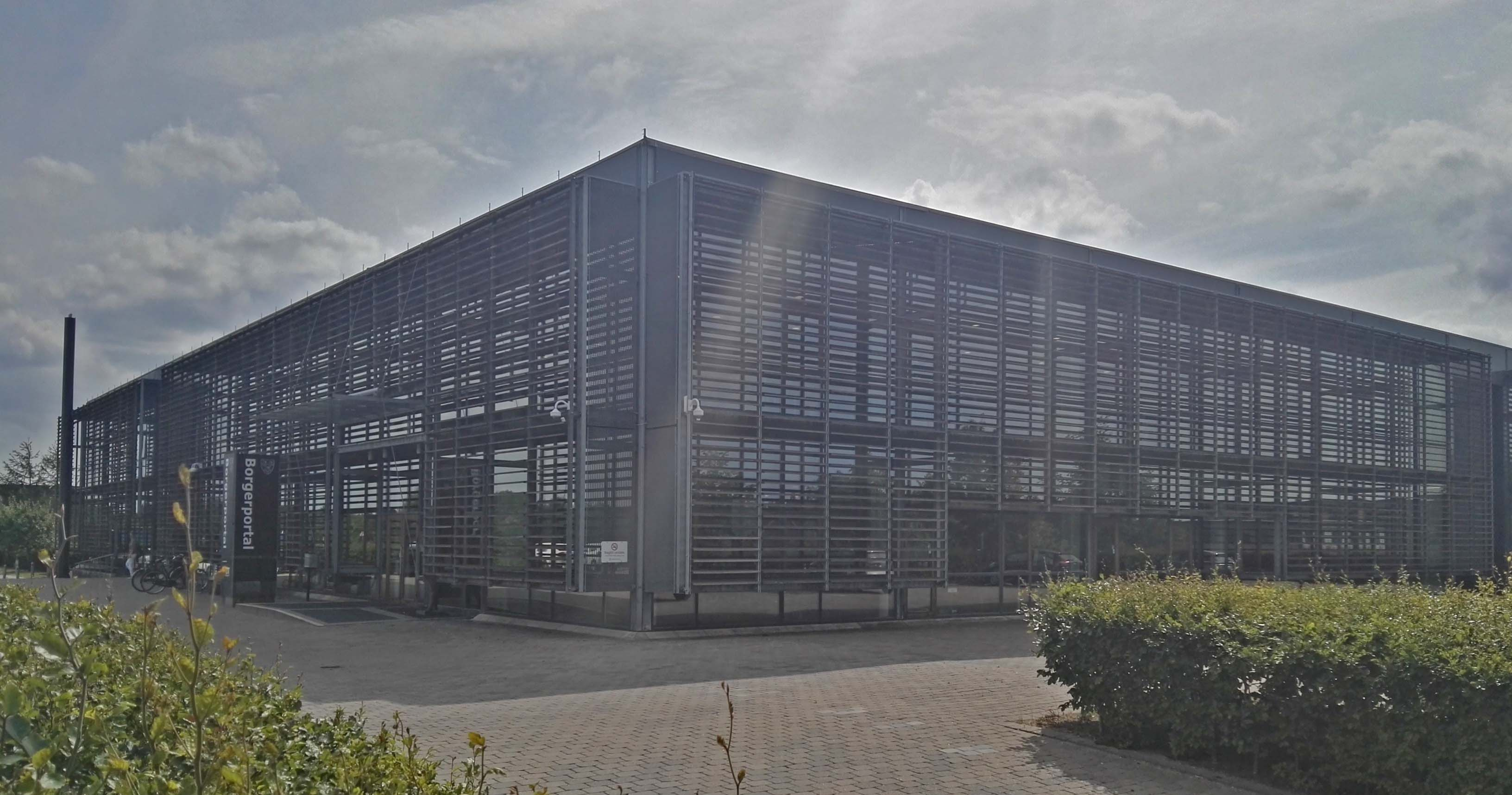
- City hall

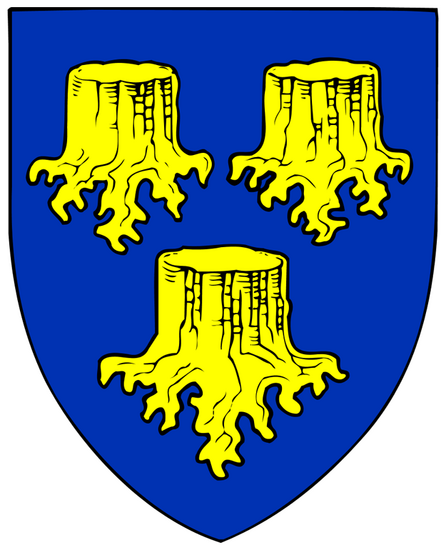
- Coat of arms

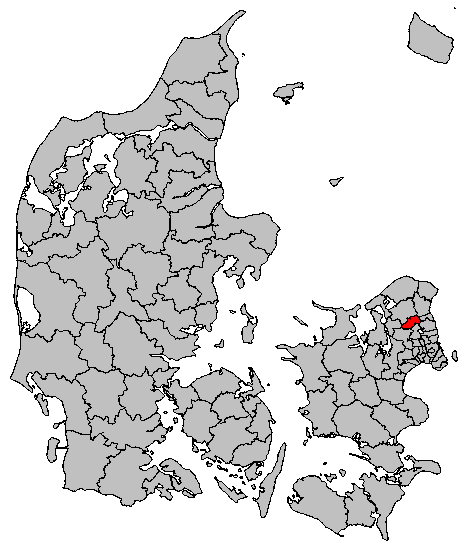
- Coordinates: 55°52′00″N 12°22′00″E
- Country: Denmark
- Region: Hovedstaden
- Established: 1 April 1970
- Seat: Lillerød

Government
  - Mayor: Karsten Längerich (V)

Area
  - Total: 67.44 km^{2} (26.04 sq mi)

Population (1 January 2026)
  - Total: 26,496
  - Density: 392.9/km^{2} (1,018/sq mi)
- Time zone: UTC+1 (CET)
  - Summer (DST): UTC+2 (CEST)
- Postal code: 3450
- Municipal code: 201
- Website: www.alleroed.dk

Allerød Kommune is a municipality (Danish, kommune) on the island of Zealand (Sjælland) in eastern Denmark. The municipality covers an area of 67 km^{2}, and has a population of 26,496 (1 January 2026). Its mayor is Karsten Längerich of the political party Venstre.

== Overview ==
The main town, Lillerød (often referred to as 'Allerød'), is also the site of the municipal council. Smaller towns inside the municipality are Blovstrød and the towns of Lynge and Uggeløse, which have grown together

Allerød municipality was not merged with other municipalities on 1 January 2007 as part of nationwide Kommunalreformen ("The Municipality Reform" of 2007).

The warm period after the last ice age (Wisconsin glaciation) is named the Allerød Oscillation after an archaeological site found at Allerød.

In 1797 six Bronze Age lurs were found in Lynge at Brudevælte.

Allerød is part of the Green Cities concept

The zip/postal code for Lillerød is 3450.

== Economy ==
Allerød has a large concentration of technology companies in its industrial zones at the outskirts of the town. These include the hearing aid company Widex, Welltec, a developer of robotic technology for the off-shore industry and Weibel Scientific, a designer and manufacturer of continuous wave doppler radars. Hewlett-Packard's Danish headquarters moved to Allerød in 2004. IBM has a large facility in Blovstrød, just outside Allerød, Widex in Vassingerød.

Other companies headquartered in Allerød are the engineering consultancy NIRAS, drug store and cosmetics chain MATAS, the development company Sjælsø Gruppen and the furniture companies Fritz Hansen and PP-Møbler.

== Culture ==
Mungo Park is a small but very influential theatre, in the town centre.

== Sports ==
The local badminton club, Lillerød BK, has won the Danish Badminton League four times and Europe League three times.

== Politics ==
=== Municipal council ===
Allerød's municipal council consists of 21 members, elected every four years.

Below are the municipal councils elected since the Municipal Reform of 2007.

Election	Party											Total seats	Turnout	Elected mayor
Election	A	B	C	D	E	E	F	O	R	V	Ø	Total seats	Turnout	Elected mayor
2005	3	1	5		1		3		2	6		21	77.8%	Eva Nejstgaard (C)
2009	3	1	4	2	1		4	1	1	4		21	76.6%	Erik Lund (C)
2013	4	1	6	2			1	1	1	4	1	21	82.0%	Jørgen Johansen (C)
2017	5	1	5			1	2		1	5	1	21	81.1%	Karsten Längerich (V)
2021	4	1	7				2			6	1	21	78.9%	Karsten Längerich (V)
Data from Kmdvalg.dk 2005, 2009, 2013, 2017 and 2021

== Locations ==
Lillerød	16,762
Lynge	4,172
Blovstrød	2,938
Nymølle	344

== See also ==
- Allerød station
- Mungo Park (theatre)
