= Lynge, Allerød =

Lynge
- Town
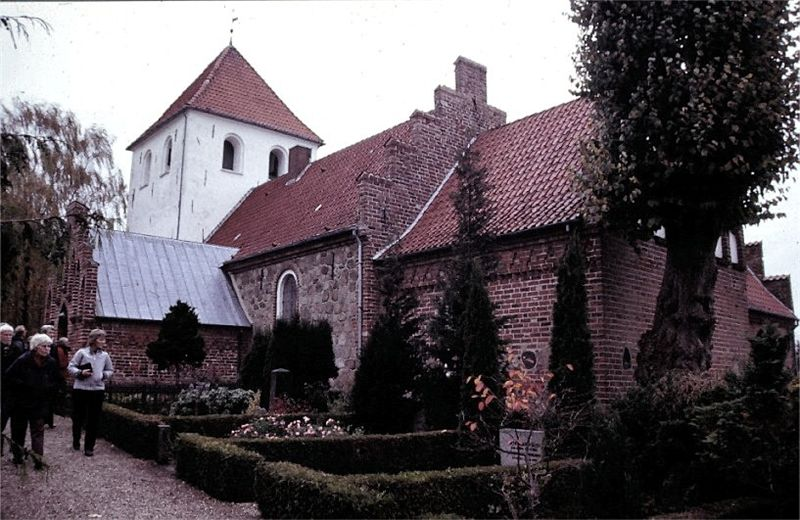
- Lynge Church

- Location within Denmark Location within Capital Region
- Coordinates: 55°50′23″N 12°16′23″E
- Country: Denmark
- Region: Capital Region
- Municipality: Allerød

Area
  - Urban: 1.9 km^{2} (0.73 sq mi)

Population (2026)
  - Urban: 4,425
  - Urban density: 2,300/km^{2} (6,000/sq mi)
  - Gender: 2,162 males and 2,263 females
- Time zone: UTC+1 (GMT)
- Postal code: DK-3540 Lynge

Lynge is a town in the western part of Allerød Municipality, North Zealand, some 30 km north of Copenhagen, Denmark. Today Lynge has grown together with the neighbouring village of Uggeløse into a small urban area with a population of 4,425 (1 January 2026).

== History ==
The first known reference to the name Lynge is in a gift letter from Canute the Holy to the Bishop Seat in Lund. The reference is to Lynge Herred but hundreds were usually named after settlements.. That the hundred was named after Lynge may indicate that the medieval road from Roskilde to central North Zealand by way of Værebro also passed Lynge.

In the 12th and 13th century, the area was dominated by the influential Hvide family. A fortified house, Langesøhus (later referred to as Borre), owned by the family, was in the Middle Ages located south of present-day Uggeløse Skov. The Hvide family seems to have left the area in about 1300. The first known reference to Uggeløse is from 15 October 1252.

Administratively, the villages of Lynge and Uggeløse were already merged into Lynge-Uggeløse Sognekommune in 1842.

Lynge station opened on the new, private Copenhagen-Slangerup Railway in 1906 and a new Lynge School was built in 1910 to design by Jesper Tvede. The station closed on 23 May 1954 when the section from Farum to Slangerup was decommissioned.

With the 1970 Danish Municipal Reform it became part of Allerød Municipality.

== Landmarks ==
Lynge and Uggeløse churches are both Romanesque village churches from about 1200. Lynge Church contains frescos (kalkmalerier) by the Issefjord Workshop.

The hearing aid manufacturer Widex is headquartered in Lynge.

== Notable people ==
- Knud Rasmussen (1879–1933) anthropologist, polar explorer, partly grew up in Lynge
- Jan Gintberg (born 1963 in Lynge) standup comedian and television personality
- Morten Jensen (born 1982 in Lynge) track athlete, competed in 2008 Olympic Games
- Morten Voldby Olsen (born 1998), footballer
