= Lillerød =

Allerød (Lillerød)
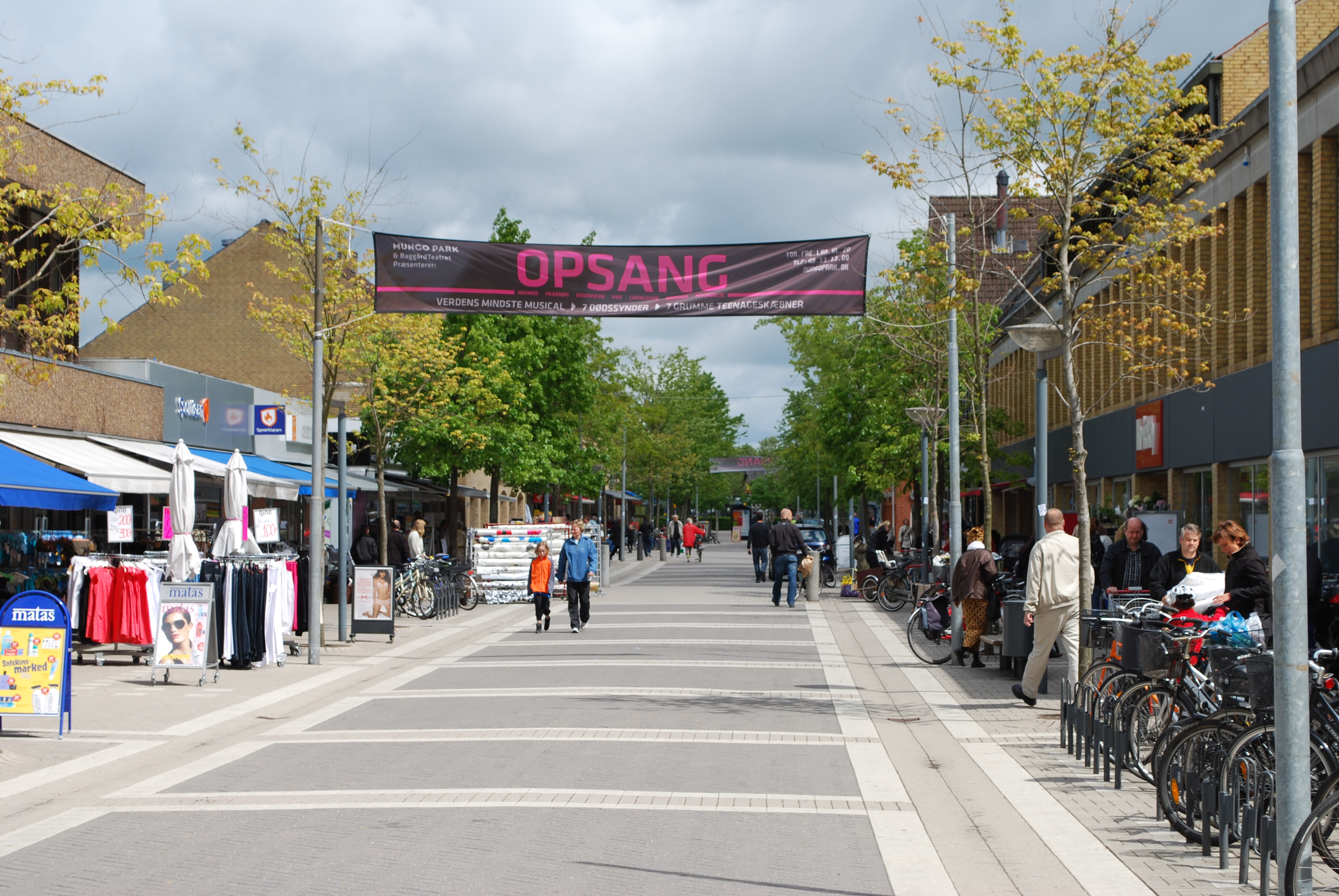
- The central road Madsensvej

- Location in Denmark Allerød (Lillerød) (Capital Region)
- Coordinates: 55°52′05″N 12°20′30″E
- Country: Denmark
- Region: Capital (Hovedstaden)
- Municipality: Allerød

Area
  - Urban: 7.5 km^{2} (2.9 sq mi)

Population (2026)
  - Urban: 16,894
  - Urban density: 2,300/km^{2} (5,800/sq mi)
  - Gender: 8,182 males and 8,712 females
- Time zone: UTC+1 (Central Europe Time)
  - Summer (DST): UTC+2

Lillerød (sometimes named Allerød) is a Danish town, seat of the Allerød Municipality, in the Region Hovedstaden. Its population 1 January 2026 was of 16,894.

== Geography ==
Lillerød is located in the northern side of the Zealand island, 27 km north-northwest (NNW) from Copenhagen and 26 km southwest (SW) from Helsingør.

== Transport ==
Lillerød is served by Allerød railway station, located on the North Line of Copenhagen's S-train network.

== Notable people ==
- Aage Haugland (1944 – 2000 in Lillerød) a Danish operatic bass
- Jussi Adler-Olsen (born 1950) a writer of crime fiction, a publisher, editor and entrepreneur; lives in Allerød
- Henrik Fisker (born 1963 in Allerød) a Danish-American automotive designer and entrepreneur, lives in Los Angeles
- Peter Reichhardt (born 1967) a Danish actor and theatre director, director of the Mungo Park from 1998 to 2005
- Kate Hall (born 1983) a Danish-British singer, brought up in Lillerød, living in Germany
- Kaka, stage name of Rajabu Willer (born 1991 in Allerød) a reggae, dancehall and hip hop artist of Tanzanian descent

=== Sport ===
- Martin Andersen (born 1986) a Danish footballer, 200 club caps
- Andreas Christensen (born 1996) a Danish footballer with Barcelona., played 68 games for Denmark.
- Rasmus Svane (born 1997 in Allerød) a German chess grandmaster

== See also ==
- Allerød station
- Mungo Park, a theatre in Lillerød
- Lillerød Church
