= 2021 Vallensbæk municipal election =

← 2017	16 November 2021	2025 →

All 15 seats to the Vallensbæk Municipal Council 8 seats needed for a majority
- Turnout: 8,147 (66.0%) ▼5.1%
	First party	Second party	Third party
	C	A	O
Party	Conservatives	Social Democrats	Danish People's Party
Last election	8 seats, 51.1%	5 seats, 25.4%	2 seats, 9.1%
Seats won	9	3	1
Seat change	▲1	▼2.0 %	▼1.0%
Popular vote	4,321	1,669	508
Percentage	53.9%	20.8%	6.3%
Swing	▲2.8 %	▼4.6 %	▼2.8%
	Fourth party	Fifth party
	Ø	F
Party	Red–Green Alliance	Green Left
Last election	0 seats, 3.5%	0 seats, 1.8%
Seats won	1	1
Seat change	▲1.0%	▲1.0%
Popular vote	375	332
Percentage	4.7%	4.1%
Swing	▲1.2%	▲2.3 %
Mayor before election
Henrik Rasmussen
Conservatives
Mayor after election
Henrik Rasmussen
Conservatives

Since 1970 the Conservatives had held the mayor's position in the municipality.

In Henrik Rasmussen had secured his 2nd full term (Note: He was also mayor from 2010 to 2013 after taking over from Kurt Hockerup) after the Conservatives won 8 seats and an absolute majority.

In this election Conservatives would gain 1 seat, and win 9 of the 15 seats. Therefore Henrik Rasmussen had an easy path to continue as the mayor, and would do so.

This would be the only election that Venstre would not contest. This may have been a result of having failed to win representation in the 2017 election.

== Electoral system ==
For elections to Danish municipalities, a number varying from 9 to 31 are chosen to be elected to the municipal council. The seats are then allocated using the D'Hondt method and a closed list proportional representation. Vallensbæk Municipality had 9 seats in 2021

Unlike in Danish General Elections, in elections to municipal councils, electoral alliances are allowed.

== Electoral alliances ==
=== Electoral Alliance 1 ===
Party		Political alignment
D	New Right	Right-wing to Far-right
O	Danish People's Party	Right-wing to Far-right

=== Electoral Alliance 2 ===
Party		Political alignment
B	Social Liberals	Centre to Centre-left
F	Green Left	Centre-left to Left-wing
Ø	Red–Green Alliance	Left-wing to Far-Left

== Results by polling station ==
T = VallensbækListen

Division	A	B	C	D	F	O	T	Ø
Division	%	%	%	%	%	%	%	%
Vallensbæk Skole, Multisalen	20.3	2.4	51.1	2.8	4.2	5.6	7.5	6.1
Egholmskolen	20.9	1.9	55.6	2.2	4.8	5.8	4.8	3.9
Pilehaveskolen	21.1	3.0	54.5	2.6	3.5	7.3	3.8	4.3

== Results ==
Party		Votes	%	+/-	Seats	+/-
Vallensbæk Municipality
C	Conservatives	4,321	53.88	+2.82	9	+1
A	Social Democrats	1,669	20.81	-4.57	3	-2
O	Danish People's Party	508	6.33	-2.78	1	-1
T	VallensbækListen	417	5.20	New	0	New
Ø	Red-Green Alliance	375	4.68	+1.21	1	+1
F	Green Left	332	4.14	+2.39	1	+1
D	New Right	202	2.52	New	0	New
B	Social Liberals	195	2.43	-1.66	0	0
Total		8,019	100	N/A	15	N/A
Invalid votes		51	0.41	+0.19		
Blank votes		77	0.62	+0.27		
Turnout		8,147	66.00	-5.13		
Source: valg.dk
