= 2025 Vallensbæk municipal election =

Municipal election in Denmark

- 18 November 2025

All 15 seats to the Vallensbæk municipal council 8 seats needed for a majority
- Turnout: 8,720 (65.0%) ▼1.0%
	First party	Second party	Third party
	C	A	O
Party	Conservatives	Social Democrats	Danish People's Party
Last election	9 seats, 53.9%	3 seats, 20.8%	1 seat, 6.3%
Seats won	9	2	2
Seat change	0	▼1	▲1
Popular vote	4,609	1,287	817
Percentage	53.7%	15.0%	9.5%
Swing	▼0.2%	▼5.8%	▲3.2%
	Fourth party	Fifth party
	F	Ø
Party	Green Left	Red-Green Alliance
Last election	1 seat, 4.1%	1 seat, 4.7%
Seats won	1	1
Seat change	0	0
Popular vote	736	627
Percentage	8.6%	7.3%
Swing	▲4.4%	▲2.6%
Mayor before election
Henrik Rasmussen
Conservatives
Mayor after election
Henrik Rasmussen
Conservatives

The 2025 Vallensbæk Municipal election was held on November 18, 2025, to elect the 15 members to sit in the regional council for the Vallensbæk Municipal council, in the period of 2026 to 2029. Henrik Rasmussen from the Conservatives, would secure re-election.

== Background ==
Following the 2021 election, Henrik Rasmussen from Conservatives became mayor for his third term.

== Electoral system ==
For elections to Danish municipalities, a number varying from 9 to 31 are chosen to be elected to the municipal council. The seats are then allocated using the D'Hondt method and a closed list proportional representation. Vallensbæk Municipality had 15 seats in 2025.

== Electoral alliances ==
=== Electoral Alliance 1 ===
Party		Political alignment
F	Green Left	Centre-left to Left-wing
Ø	Red-Green Alliance	Left-wing to Far-Left

=== Electoral Alliance 2 ===
Party		Political alignment
I	Liberal Alliance	Centre-right to Right-wing
O	Danish People's Party	Right-wing to Far-right
V	Venstre	Centre-right

== Results by polling station ==
Division	A	C	F	I	O	V	Ø
Division	%	%	%	%	%	%	%
Vallensbæk Skole, Multisalen	15.5	50.0	8.7	4.3	9.6	2.5	9.3
Egholmskolen	15.8	55.0	9.3	3.2	8.8	2.3	5.7
Pilehaveskolen	13.8	55.8	7.8	2.6	10.1	2.9	7.0

== Results ==
Party		Votes	%	+/-	Seats	+/-
Vallensbæk Municipality
C	Conservatives	4,609	53.71	-0.18	9	0
A	Social Democrats	1,287	15.00	-5.82	2	-1
O	Danish People's Party	817	9.52	+3.18	2	+1
F	Green Left	736	8.58	+4.44	1	0
Ø	Red-Green Alliance	627	7.31	+2.63	1	0
I	Liberal Alliance	286	3.33	New	0	New
V	Venstre	220	2.56	New	0	New
Total		8,582	100	N/A	15	N/A
Invalid votes		52	0.39	-0.03		
Blank votes		86	0.64	+0.12		
Turnout		8,720	65.01	-0.99		
Source: valg.dk

== Opinion polls ==
Polling firm	Fieldwork date	Sample size	C	A	O	Ø	F	I	V	Lead
Epinion	4 Sep - 13 Oct 2025	410	52.3	15.5	10.2	5.4	9.5	3.3	3.2	36.8
2024 european parliament election	9 Jun 2024		16.2	16.3	7.0	8.0	13.1	7.2	12.4	0.1
2022 general election	1 Nov 2022		10.8	27.0	3.8	3.6	7.4	7.7	10.3	16.2
2021 regional election	16 Nov 2021		37.3	26.4	5.1	5.1	5.4	1.3	7.3	10.9
2021 municipal election	16 Nov 2021		53.9 (9)	20.8 (3)	6.3 (1)	4.7 (1)	4.1 (1)	–	–	33.1
