= Vallensbæk Municipality =

Vallensbæk Municipality Vallensbæk Kommune (Danish)
- Municipality
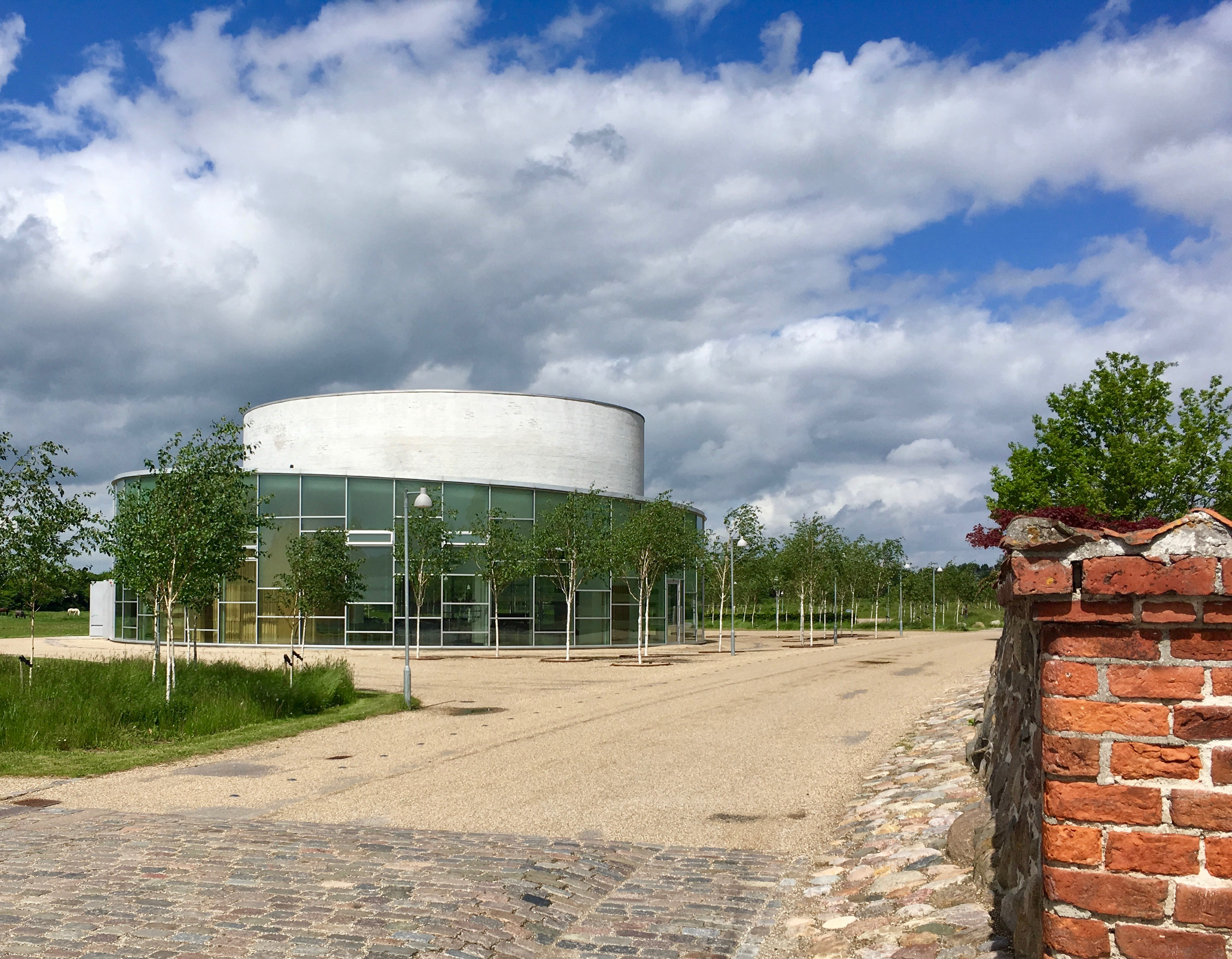
- Three Kings Church in Vallensbæk Landsby

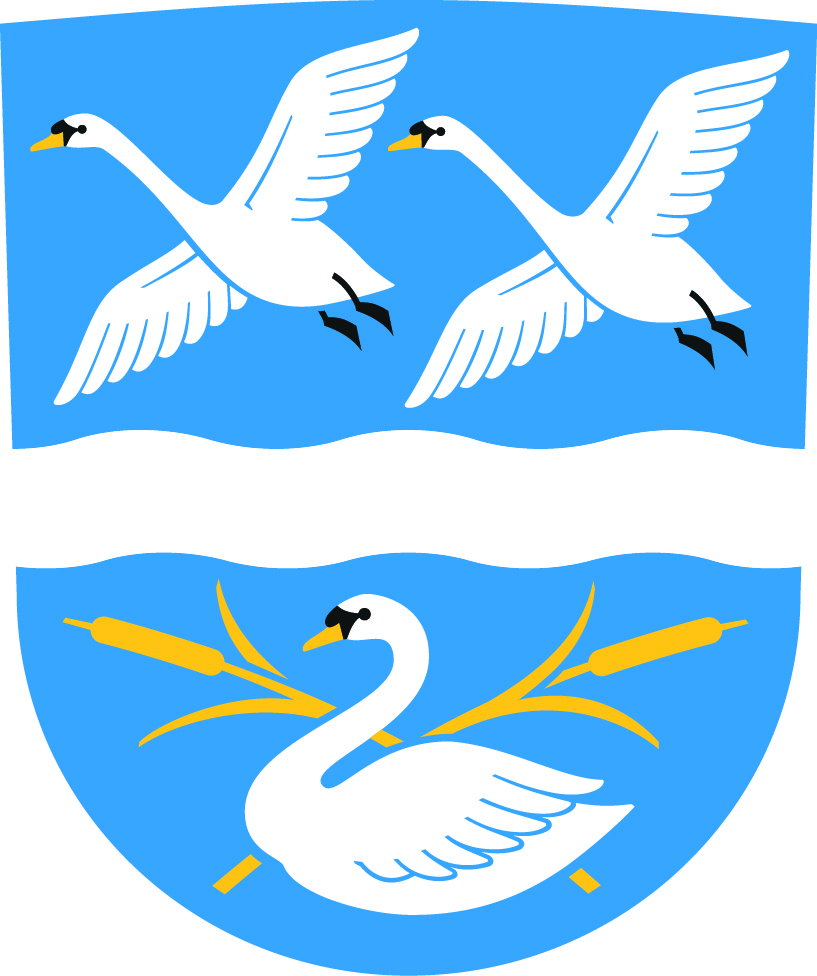
- Coat of arms

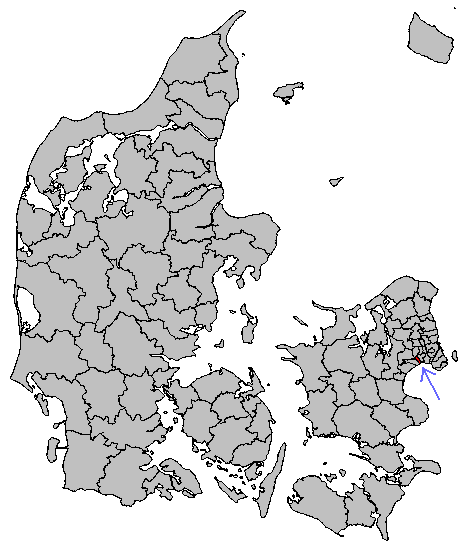
- Coordinates: 55°38′00″N 12°22′00″E
- Country: Denmark
- Region: Capital Region
- Established: April 1, 1970
- Seat: Vallensbæk

Government
  - Mayor: Henrik Rasmussen (C)

Area
  - Total: 9.23 km^{2} (3.56 sq mi)

Population (1 January 2026)
  - Total: 18,689
  - Density: 2,020/km^{2} (5,240/sq mi)
- Time zone: UTC+1 (CET)
  - Summer (DST): UTC+2 (CEST)
- Postal code: 2665
- Municipal code: 187
- Website: www.vallensbaek.dk

Vallensbæk Municipality (Danish: Vallensbæk Kommune) is a municipality (Danish: kommune) in the Capital Region of Denmark on Zealand. It is part of the Greater Copenhagen area and consist primarily of the suburb of Vallensbæk. It is one of the smallest municipalities in Denmark in terms of area. Vallensbæk Municipality borders the municipalities of Ishøj, Høje-Taastrup, Albertslund and Brøndby. It borders Køge Bay, and the Køge Bay Beach Park (Danish: Køge Bugt Strandpark) along the coast. The suburb of Vallensbæk consists of two sections, not directly connected to each other: Vallensbæk Nordmark in the north and Vallensbæk Strand in the south. The two parts of the town are commonly referred to together as Vallensbæk. The only other settlement in the municipality is the village of Vallensbæk Landsby.

The municipality's mayor has been Henrik Rasmussen, a member of the Conservative People's Party, since 2010. The Conservative People's Party has held the position as mayor since the municipality's creation in 1970.

Vallensbæk Municipality was not merged with any other municipality in the municipal reform of 2007.

== History ==
Vallensbæk is known from at least 1184 under the name Wolensbech, possibly translating to 'narrow land area' or 'the field with the brook'. In the Middle Ages, when Denmark was divided into syssels, Vallensbæk was part of Østersyssel. It later became a part of Copenhagen Fief, which was changed to Copenhagen County in 1661. Although Copenhagen County changed many times over the years, Vallensbæk always remained within the borders. When the counties were disestablished in 2007, Vallensbæk came under the new Capital Region of Denmark.

Since 1842, and until the 1970 Danish Municipal Reform, Vallensbæk was a parish municipality. It became a regular municipality with the 1970 reform, and its borders have remained unchanged since. Vallensbæk wasn't merged with any other municipality in the 2007 municipal reform.

== Towns ==
Below are all settlements in the municipality with populations of at least 200 people (populations as of 2020).

Vallensbæk	16,098
Vallensbæk Landsby	430

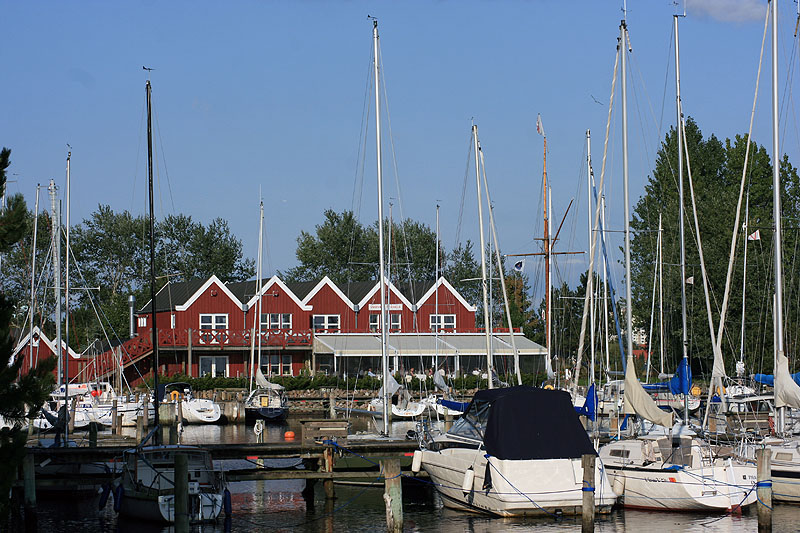
Vallensbæk Harbour.

=== Vallensbæk ===
Vallensbæk is part of the Greater Copenhagen Area, and is divided into Vallensbæk Nordmark in the north of the municipality and Vallensbæk Strand in the south by the coast. Vallensbæk Nordmark is almost entirely residential buildings, mainly detached houses, with a small industrial area and an area with schools and institutions. Vallensbæk Nordmark is connected to Albertslund.

In the northern part of Vallensæk Strand is an industrial area and many city blocks. The rest of Vallensbæk Strand are mainly detached houses. Near the center of Vallensbæk Strand is Vallensbæk railway station, as well as a number of amenities, schools and institutions. By the coast, not directly connected to Vallensbæk Strand, is a sizable marina. Next to the marina is Køge Bugt Strandpark, of which a small portion is in Vallensbæk Municipality. Vallensbæk Strand is connected to Brøndby Strand.

The beaches in Vallensbæk Municipality are administered by Ishøj Municipality.

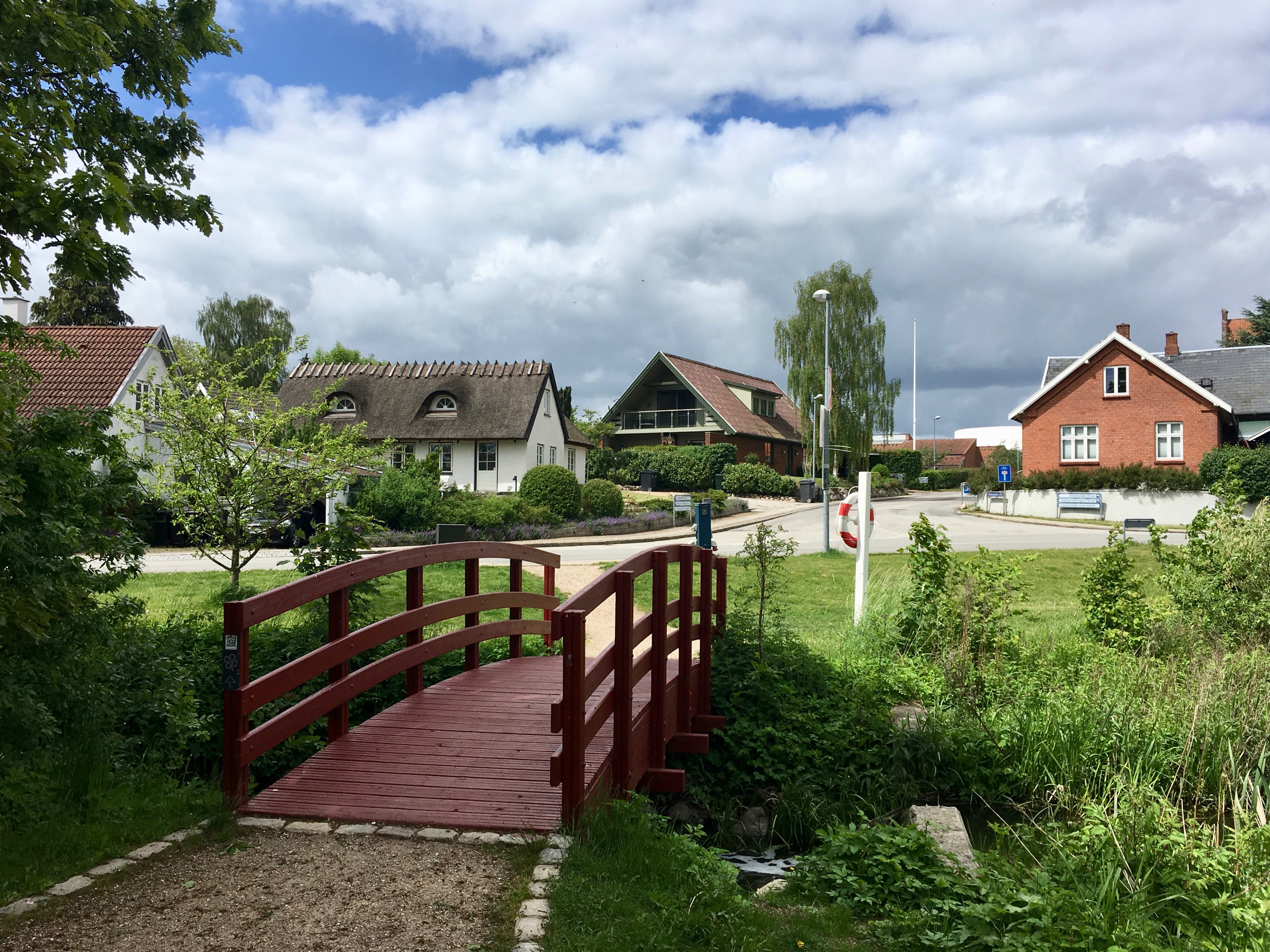
Vallensbæk Landsby.

=== Vallensbæk Landsby ===
Vallensbæk Landsby (Danish for Vallensbæk Village) is a village located centrally between Vallensbæk Strand and Vallensbæk Nordmark. In the village are the only two churches in the municipality: the Three Kings Church (Danish: Helligtrekongers Kirke), a modern church built between 2006 and 2012, and Vallensbæk Church from the 1100s.

== Nature ==
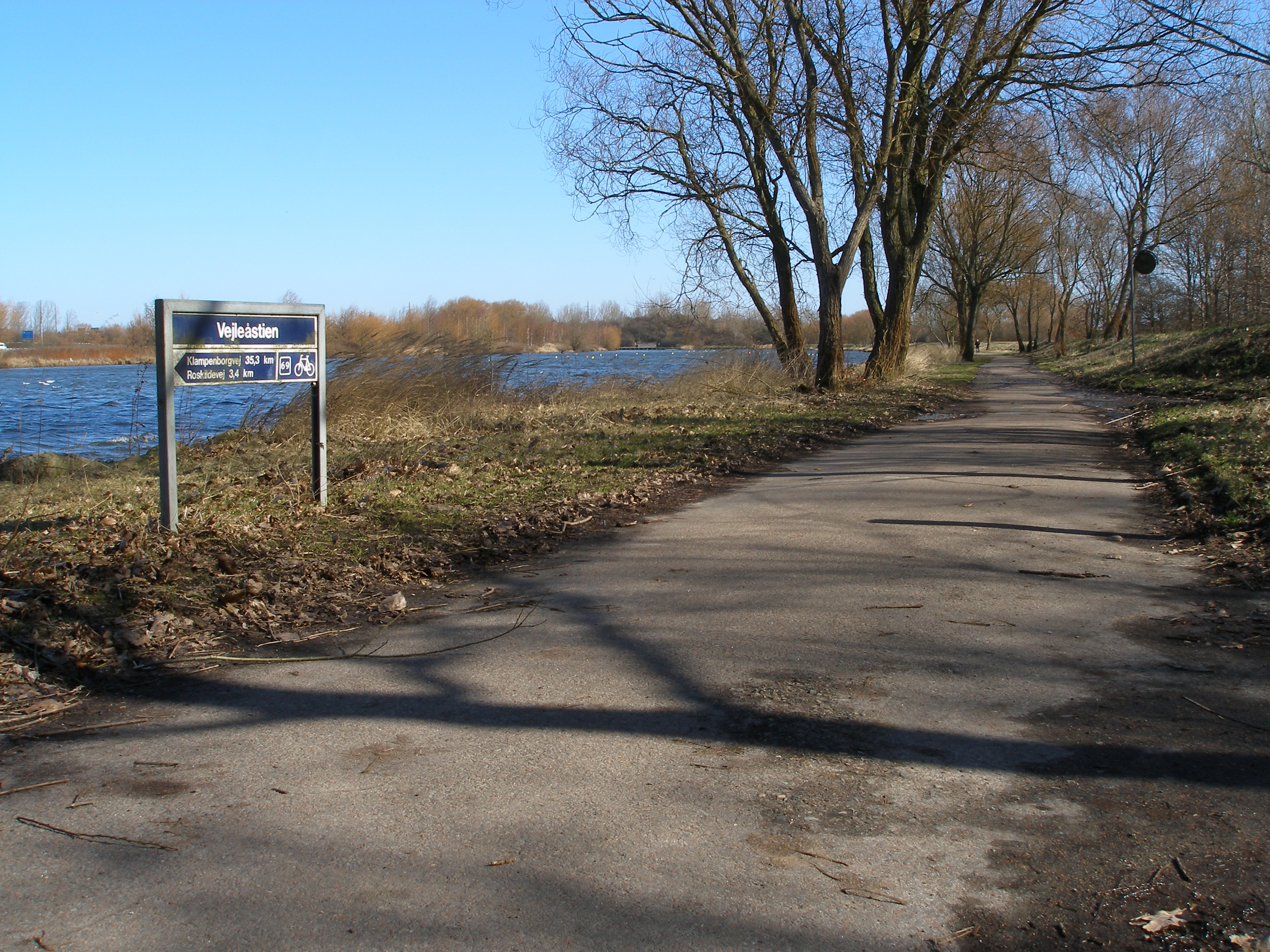
Biking and hiking trail by Vallensbæk Bog.

Located in the Great Copenhagen Area, there aren't much nature in Vallensbæk Municipality. There are no protected nature within the municipality's borders.

South-west of Vallensbæk Nordmark is a bog named Vallensbæk Bog (Danish: Vallensbæk Mose). It spans 50 acres and is mainly located in Vallensbæk Municipality, but also in the municipalities of Albertslund, Høje Taastrup and Ishøj. The bog includes the two lakes of Tueholm Lake (Danish: Tueholmsøen) and Vallensbæk Lake (Danish: Vallensbæk Sø), which is home to a variety of birds. Both lakes were artificially created in 1972 in order to prevent floodings from the river of Store Vejleå.

=== Køge Bugt Strandpark ===
Køge Bugt Strandpark (translating to Køge Bay Beach Park) is a park in Køge Bay. It is artificially made and was opened in 1980. It is located along the coast of the bay, in Greve, Ishøj, Vallensbæk and Brøndby municipalities.

The park is home to many species of birds, with common redshank and northern lapwing breeding in the area. Many types of waders and shorebirds breed on the meadows. The European green toad, rare in Denmark, can be seen in the park, though mostly in the part of the park located in Greve Municipality.

== Politics ==
Vallensbæk Municipality was not merged with any adjacent municipality under the municipal reform of 2007, as it agreed to enter into a "municipal cooperation agreement" with Ishøj Municipality.

=== Municipal council ===
Vallensbæk's municipal council consists of 15 members, elected every four years.

Below are the municipal council elected since the municipality's creation in 1970.

Election	Party							Total seats	Turnout	Elected mayor
Election	A	B	C	F	O	V	Z	Total seats	Turnout	Elected mayor
1970	4	1	6					11		Poul Hansen (C)
1974	4	1	8	1			1	15		Poul Hansen (C)
1978	5		9	1				15		Poul Hansen (C)
1981	4		10	1				15		Poul Hansen (C)
1985	4		9	2				15		Poul Hansen (C)
1989	5		8	1		1		15		Poul Hansen (C)
1993	4		10			1		15		Kurt Hockerup (C)
1997	4		10			1		15		Kurt Hockerup (C)
2001	4		10			1		15		Kurt Hockerup (C)
2005	4		10			1		15	73.5%	Kurt Hockerup (C)
2009	4		8	1	1	1		15	70.0%	Kurt Hockerup (C)
2013	3		8	1	2	1		15	73.6%	Henrik Rasmussen (C)
2017	5		8		2			15	71.1%	Henrik Rasmussen (C)
Data from Kmdvalg.dk, Statistikbanken.dk and editions of Kommunal Aarbog

=== Mayors ===
Since the 1970 Danish Municipal Reform, the mayors of Vallensbæk Municipality have been:

#	Mayor	Party	Term
1	Poul Hansen	Conservative People's Party	1970–1993
2	Kurt Hockerup	Conservative People's Party	1994–2010
3	Henrik Rasmussen	Conservative People's Party	2010–present

== Economy ==
The largest industries in Vallensbæk Municipality are retail, education, social institutions and transport.

Companies with their headquarter in Vallensbæk Municipality include medico-company Simonsen & Weel. Another company set in the municipality is Frugt.dk, Denmark's largest distributor of fruit for companies. A documentation service company called Ricoh is also set in the municipality.

== Demographics ==
Historical population
Year	Pop.	±%
1971	8,105	—
1975	9,905	+22.2%
1980	12,320	+24.4%
1985	12,085	−1.9%
1990	11,752	−2.8%
1995	12,081	+2.8%
2000	12,047	−0.3%
2005	12,260	+1.8%
2010	14,045	+14.6%
2015	15,204	+8.3%
2020	16,633	+9.4%
2021	16,515	−0.7%
Source: Statistikbanken.dk

There are 16,633 people living in Vallensbæk Municipality (2020). 50.06% are men and 49.94% are women.

Below is the age distribution of the municipality.

Age
1. 0–5 (7.94%)
2. 6–17 (16.1%)
3. 18–35 (21.0%)
4. 36–64 (36.3%)
5. 64+ (18.6%)

== Education ==
There are 3 ground schools, 1 independent school and 1 special school. There is also 1 music school.

There is 1 library in the municipality, located at Vallensbæk Strand. Citizens in Vallensbæk Nordmark can pick up reserved books at the nearby public school.

== Sights ==
The small size of the municipality means that there is a limited number of attractions. The nature areas in the municipality, however, are popular tourist destinations.

- Little Tilde (Danish: Lille Tilde) is a large wooden sculpture located in Vallensbæk Bog. It portrays a troll, and was part of a project where six municipalities in the western suburbs of Copenhagen would commission wooden sculptures of giants to be located in nature areas. Little Tilde was made by Thomas Dambo.
- Vallensbæk Harbour (Danish: Vallensbæk Havn) is a harbour and marina located by the Køge Bay Beach Park, south of Vallensbæk Strand. The marina has room for approximately 600 boats.

=== Churches ===
See List of churches in Vallensbæk Municipality

== Parishes ==
There is 1 parish in Vallensbæk Municipality that encompass the entire municipality. Shown in the table below is the population of the parish, as well as the percentage of that population that are members of the Church of Denmark. All numbers are from 1 January 2020.

#	Parish	Population	%	Source
1	Vallensbæk	16,589	58.59	

== Symbols ==
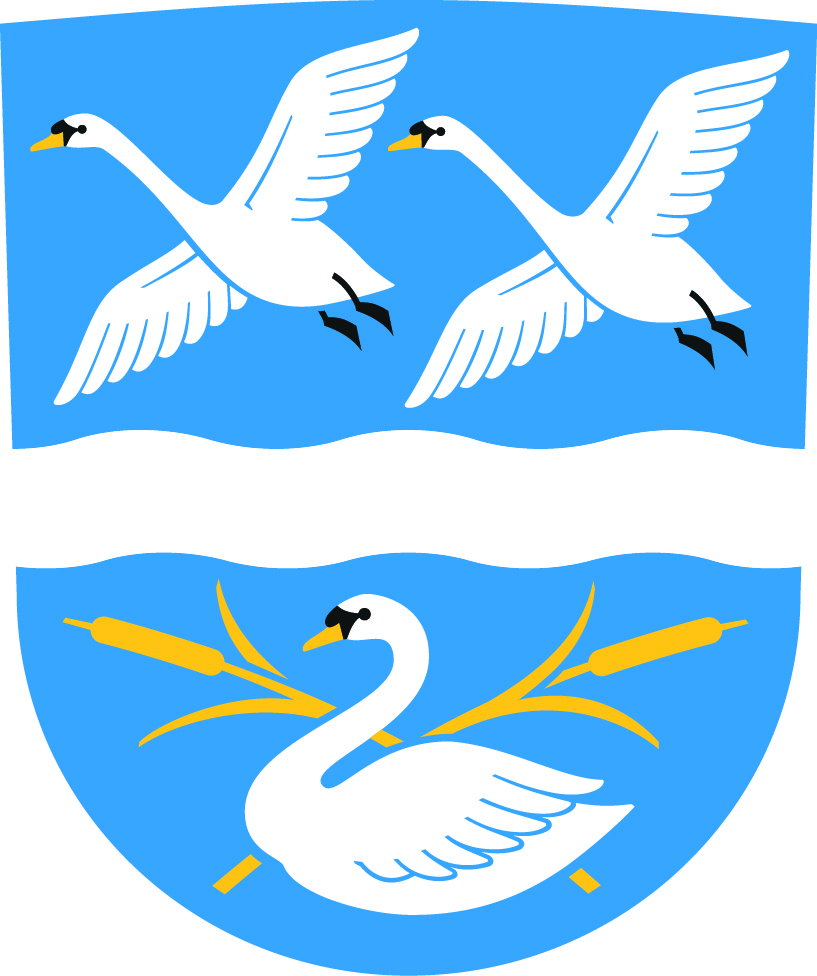
Current coat of arms from 2013 (left) and the former coat of arms from 2003 (right).

Vallensbæk's coat of arms originate from 1952 and was designed by Aage Wulff. Wulff focused on Vallensbæk location around water, with the river of Store Vejleå crossing the municipality. The coat of arms is blue, with two white swans in flight at the top. A wavy white line, representing Store Vejleå goes across the coat of arms in the middle. At the bottom is a swimming swan, and behind it two crossed reeds. The coat of arms was changed in 2003, with the swans turned to face right instead of left, and the background color and river changed to a darker green. The changes were reverted in 2013, where the swans were flipped back to face left again. The background color was returned to blue and the white line in the middle returned to white.

== Notable residents ==
- Niels Knudsen (1904–1987), architect
- Pia Olsen Dyhr (born 1971), politician, member of the Folketing and chairman of the Socialist People's Party
- Nicolai Wael (born 1972), football manager
- Amalie Wichmann (born 1995), handball player
