= Poul Hansen (disambiguation) =

Poul Hansen (1913–1966) was a Danish minister of defence and minister of finance.

Poul Hansen may also refer to:

- Poul Hansen Korsør (died 1655), Danish colonial governor
- Poul Hansen (football manager) (born 1953), Danish top-flight football (soccer) manager
- Poul L. Hansen (1916–2002), Danish international football (soccer) player
- Poul Hansen (sport wrestler) (1891–1948), Danish Olympic silver medalist sport wrestler
- Poul Hansen Egede (1708–1789), Danish-Norwegian missionary to Greenland
- Poul Hansen (mayor) (1922–2017), Danish mayor

== See also ==
- Paul Hanson (disambiguation)
