= List of churches in Vallensbæk Municipality =

This list of churches in Vallensbæk Municipality lists church buildings in Vallensbæk Municipality, Denmark.

== National Churches ==
=== Three Kings Church ===
Three Kings Church
- Helligtrekongers Kirke
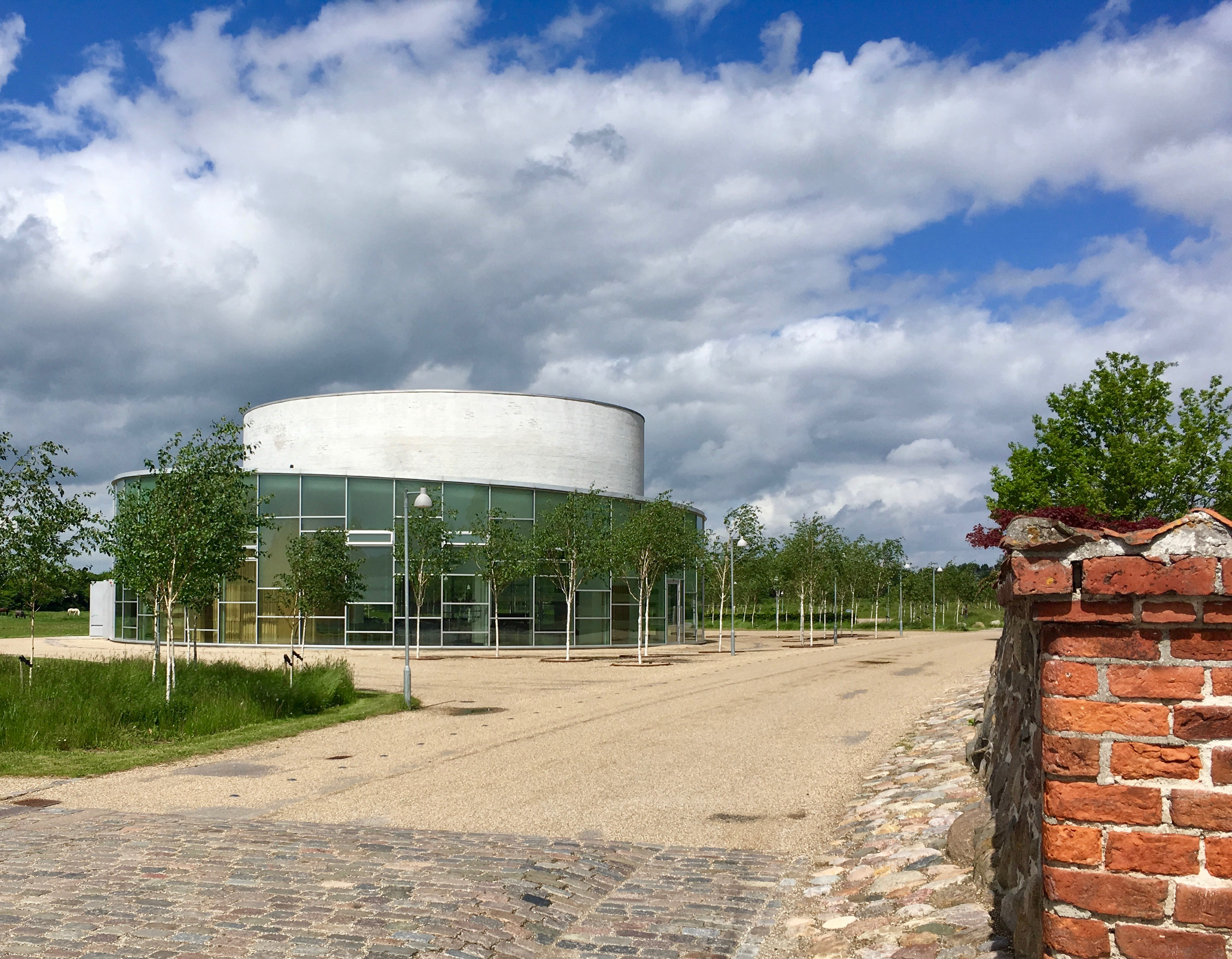
- Three Kings Church
- 55°38′17.15″N 12°21′53.03″E
- Location: Vallensbæk Landsby, Denmark
- Denomination: Church of Denmark

Architecture
- Completed: 2012

Administration
- Diocese: Diocese of Helsingør
- Deanery: Glostrup Provsti
- Parish: Vallensbæk Parish

Three Kings Church is located in Vallensbæk Landsby. It is one of two national churches in Vallensbæk Parish. The two churches are located next to each other and share a cemetery.

The church was built in 2012. It is cylindrical, with a façade in glass.

Decorations in the church include a variety of biblical quotes, selected by poet Søren Ulrik Thomsen. The crucifix is created by silversmith Allan Scharf. In 2018 a cross by Steen Christensen was placed on the plaza in front of the church. A metallic tree, made by Arne Nielsen, is located next to the church's baptismal font. Whenever someone is baptised in the church, their name is stitched onto a cloth apple and the apple hung on the tree. At a later ceremony, the apples are 'harvested' by the people baptised and their families.

=== Vallensbæk Church ===
Vallensbæk Church
- Vallensbæk Kirke
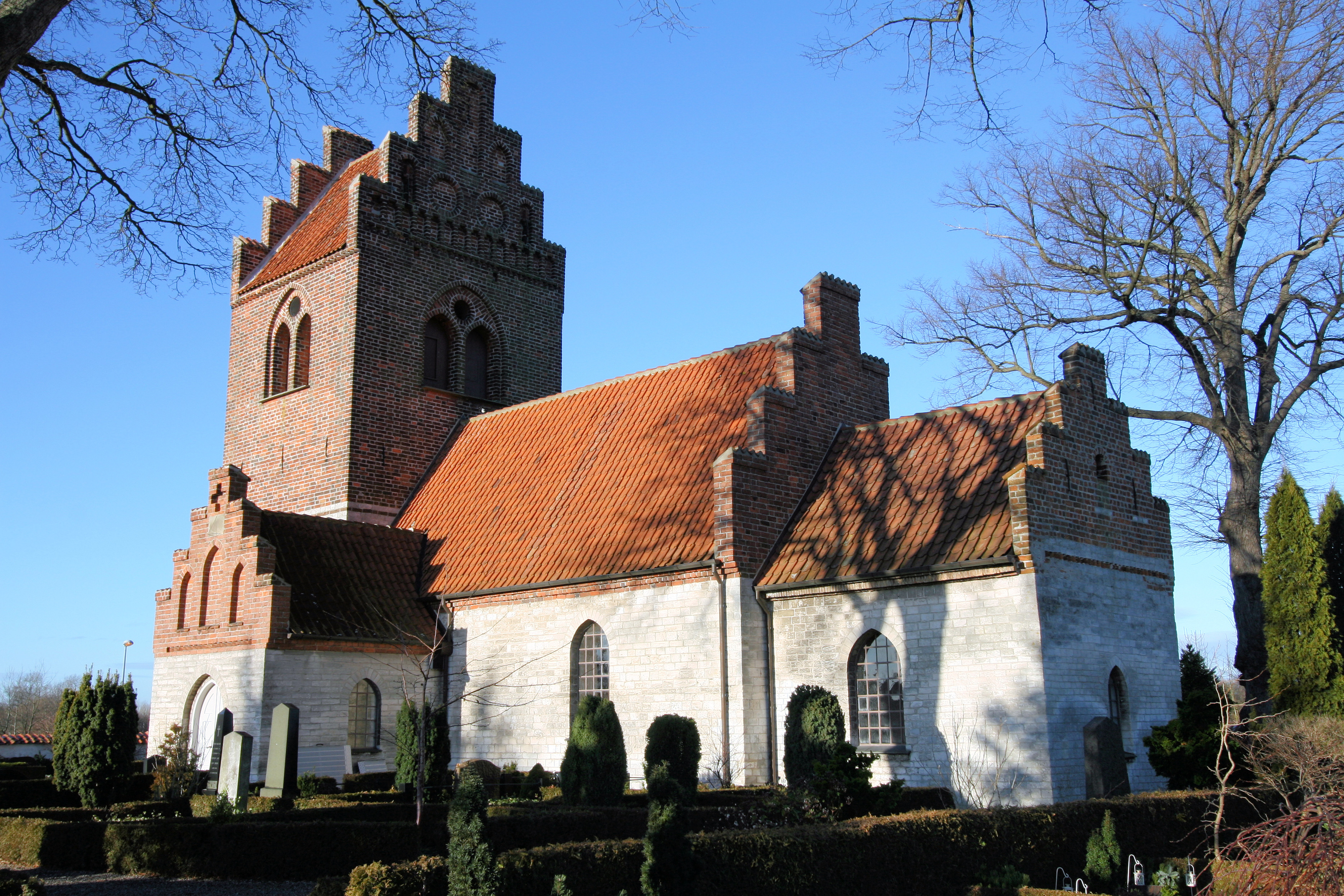
- Vallensbæk Church
- 55°38′16.36″N 12°21′55.54″E
- Location: Vallensbæk Landsby, Denmark
- Denomination: Church of Denmark

History
- Founded: 1100s

Administration
- Diocese: Diocese of Helsingør
- Deanery: Glostrup Provsti
- Parish: Vallensbæk Parish

Vallensbæk Church is located in Vallensbæk Landsby. It is one of two national churches in Vallensbæk Parish. The two churches are located next to each other and share a cemetery.

The church originates from the 1100s, built between 1150—1200. The choir and nave are the original parts of the church, with the tower built in the 1500s. There was a fire in the church in 2007, requiring extensive restoration to the frescoes.

The church's baptismal font is from the 1200s. The pulpit is from the 1650s. The organ is from 1976.
