= Kurt Hockerup =

Danish politician

Mayor of Vallensbæk Municipality
- In office 1 January 1994 – 29 March 2010
- Preceded by: Poul Hansen (C)
- Succeeded by: Henrik Rasmussen (C)

Personal details
- Born: 18 December 1944 Glostrup, Denmark
- Died: 29 March 2010 (aged 65)
- Party: Conservative People's Party

Kurt Hockerup (December 18, 1944 – March 29, 2010) was a Danish politician, who served as mayor of Vallensbæk Municipality from 1994 until his death, elected for Conservative People's Party.

He was elected to the municipal first time in 1966. He was in many years chairman of the municipality's technical committee, and became mayor in 1994. In 2004 he demanded that the municipality remained independent in the forthcoming local government, which the majority of voters in a referendum backed up on. Vallensbæk got a cooperation agreement with Ishøj Municipality and remained thus independent.

Kurt Hockerup died on March 29, 2010, from cardiac arrest. After his death, Henrik Rasmussen was elected as new mayor.
