= Paul Hanson =

Paul Hanson may also refer to:

- Paul D. Hanson (born 1939), American biblical scholar
- Paul Hanson (guitarist) (born 1957), American guitarist
- Paul Hanson (bassoonist) (born 1961), American bassoonist

== See also ==
- Poul Hansen (disambiguation)
