= Poul Hansen (mayor) =

Danish politician

Mayor of Vallensbæk Municipality
- In office 1 April 1970 – 31 December 1993
- Preceded by: None
- Succeeded by: Kurt Hockerup (C)

Leader of Vallensbæk Parish Municipality
- In office 1967–1970

Personal details
- Born: 23 March 1922 Glostrup, Denmark
- Died: 14 June 2017 (aged 95)
- Party: Conservative People's Party

Poul Hansen (23 March 1922 — 14 June 2017) was a Danish politician from the Conservative People's Party. He was the leader of Vallensbæk Parish Municipality from 1967 and until the formation of the new Vallensbæk Municipality after the 1970 Danish Municipal Reform on 1 April 1970. He became the mayor of the new municipality, and remained in the position until 1993 when Kurt Hockerup, also from the Conservative People's Party, took over. Hansen died on 14 June 2017.
