= Amalie Wichmann =

Danish handball player (born 1995)

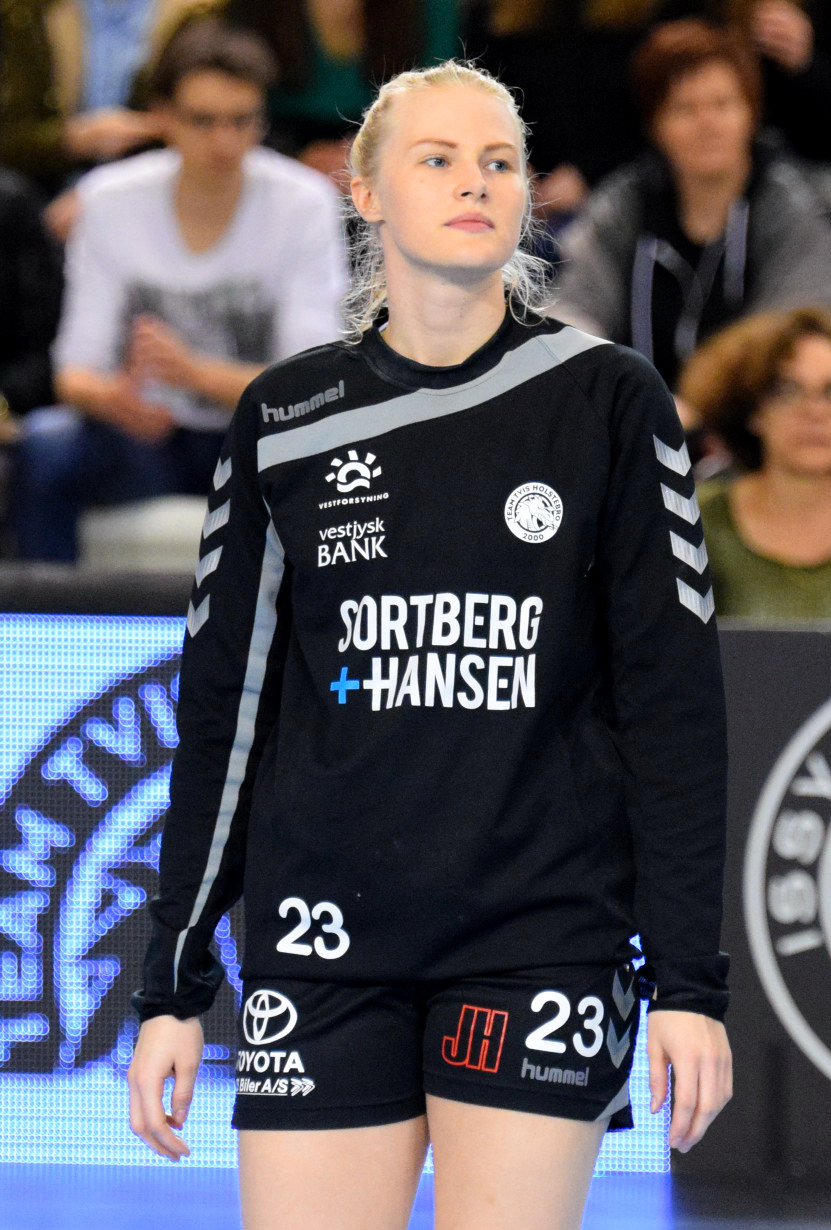

Personal information
- Full name: Amalie Riggelsen Wichmann
- Nationality: Danish
- Born: 6 March 1995 (age 31) Vallensbæk, Denmark
- Height: 1.83 m (6 ft 0 in)

Sport
- Sport: Handball
- Position: Left Back
- Current club: Horsens HK
- Number: 23

Youth career
- Years: Team
- -2013: Rødovre HK

Senior clubs
- Years: Team
- 2013-2015: Nykøbing Falster Håndboldklub
- 2015-2016: Skanderborg Håndbold
- 2016-2018: TTH Holstebro
- 2018-2020: Horsens HK
Medal record
IHF Junior World Championship
Bronze medal – third place	2014 Croatia
European Junior Championship
Bronze medal – third place	2013 Denmark
European Youth Championship
Silver medal – second place	2011 Czech Republic

Amalie Riggelsen Wichmann (born 4 March 1995) is a Danish handball player who currently plays for Horsens HK.
