= Vallensbæk Landsby =

- Village
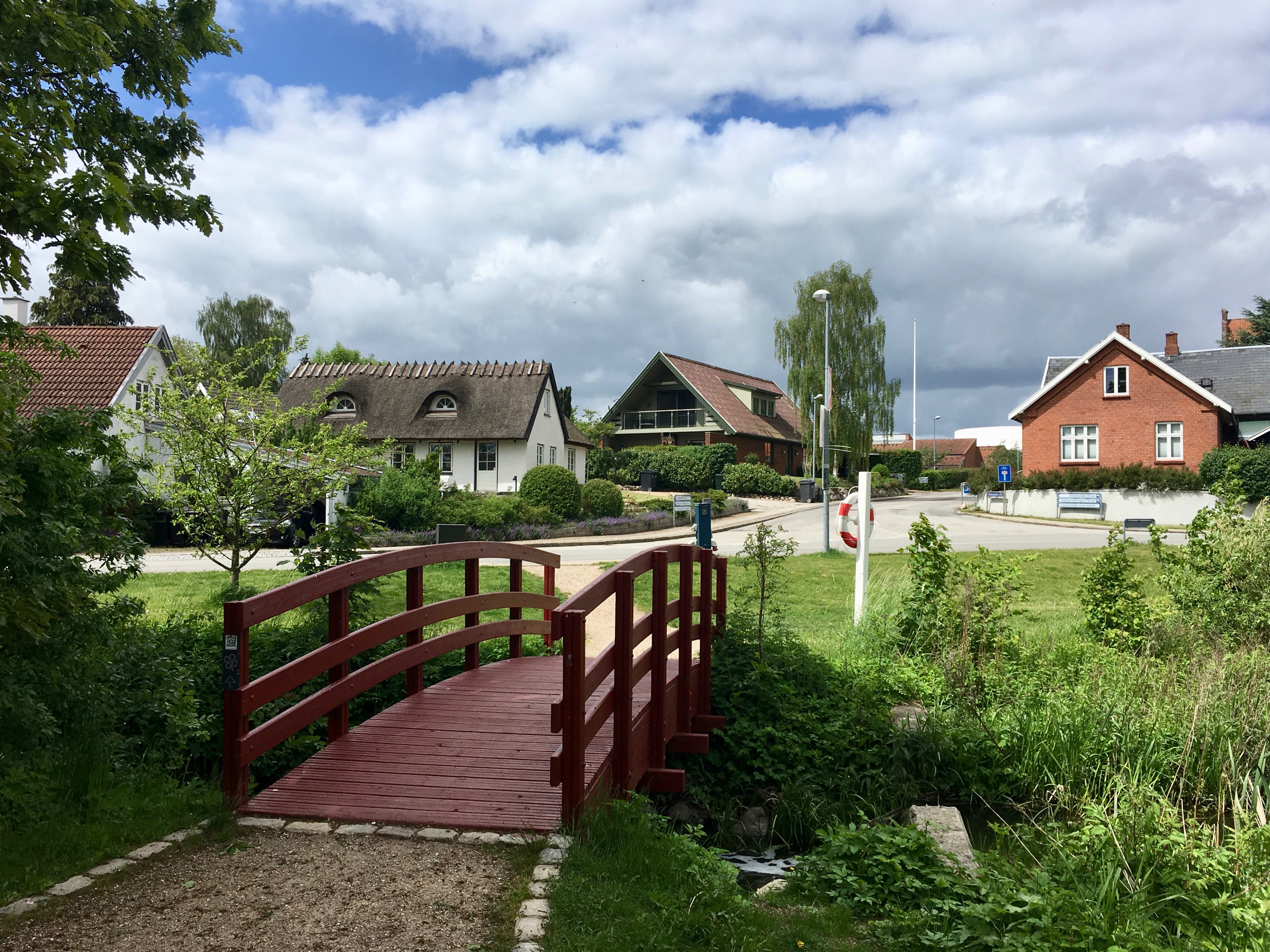
- Vallensbæk Landsby

- Location in the Capital Region of Denmark
- Coordinates: 55°38′10″N 12°21′51″E
- Country: Denmark
- Region: Capital Region
- Municipality: Vallensbæk

Population (2026)
  - Total: 473
- Time zone: UTC+1 (CET)
  - Summer (DST): UTC+2 (CEST)

Vallensbæk Landsby is a village on Zealand, located in Vallensbæk Municipality in the Capital Region of Denmark.

== History ==
Vallensbæk Church was built in the 1100s.
