= Ishøj Municipality =

Ishøj Municipality Ishøj Kommune (Danish)
- Municipality
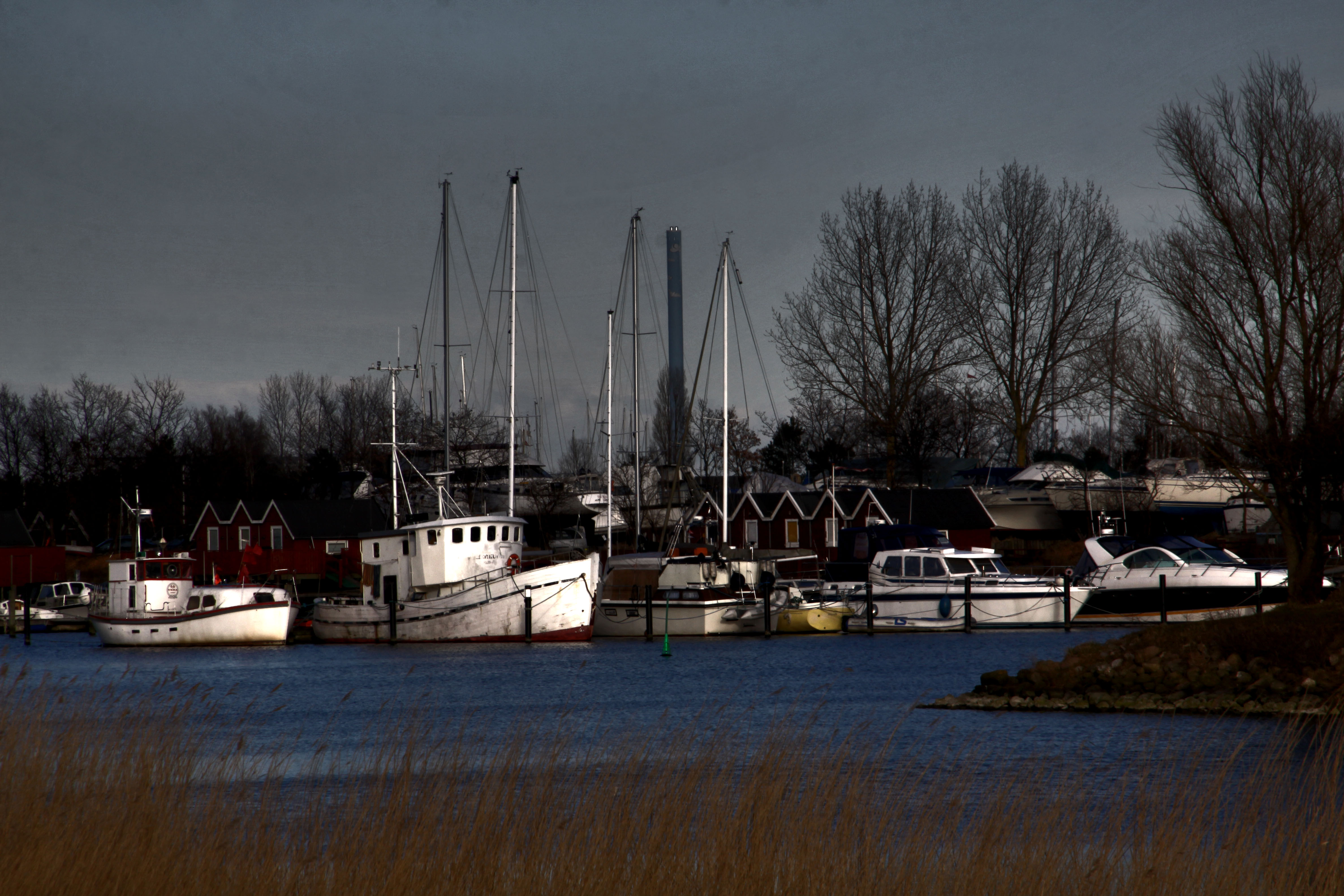

- Coat of arms

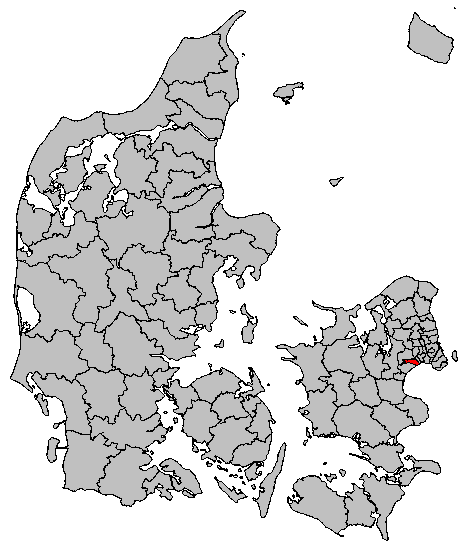
- Coordinates: 55°37′00″N 12°19′00″E
- Country: Denmark
- Region: Hovedstaden
- Established: 1 April 1970
- Seat: Ishøj

Government
  - Mayor: Ole Bjørstorp (S)

Area
  - Total: 25.94 km^{2} (10.02 sq mi)

Population (1 January 2026)
  - Total: 24,685
  - Density: 951.6/km^{2} (2,465/sq mi)
- Time zone: UTC+1 (CET)
  - Summer (DST): UTC+2 (CEST)
- Municipal code: 183
- Website: ishoj.dk

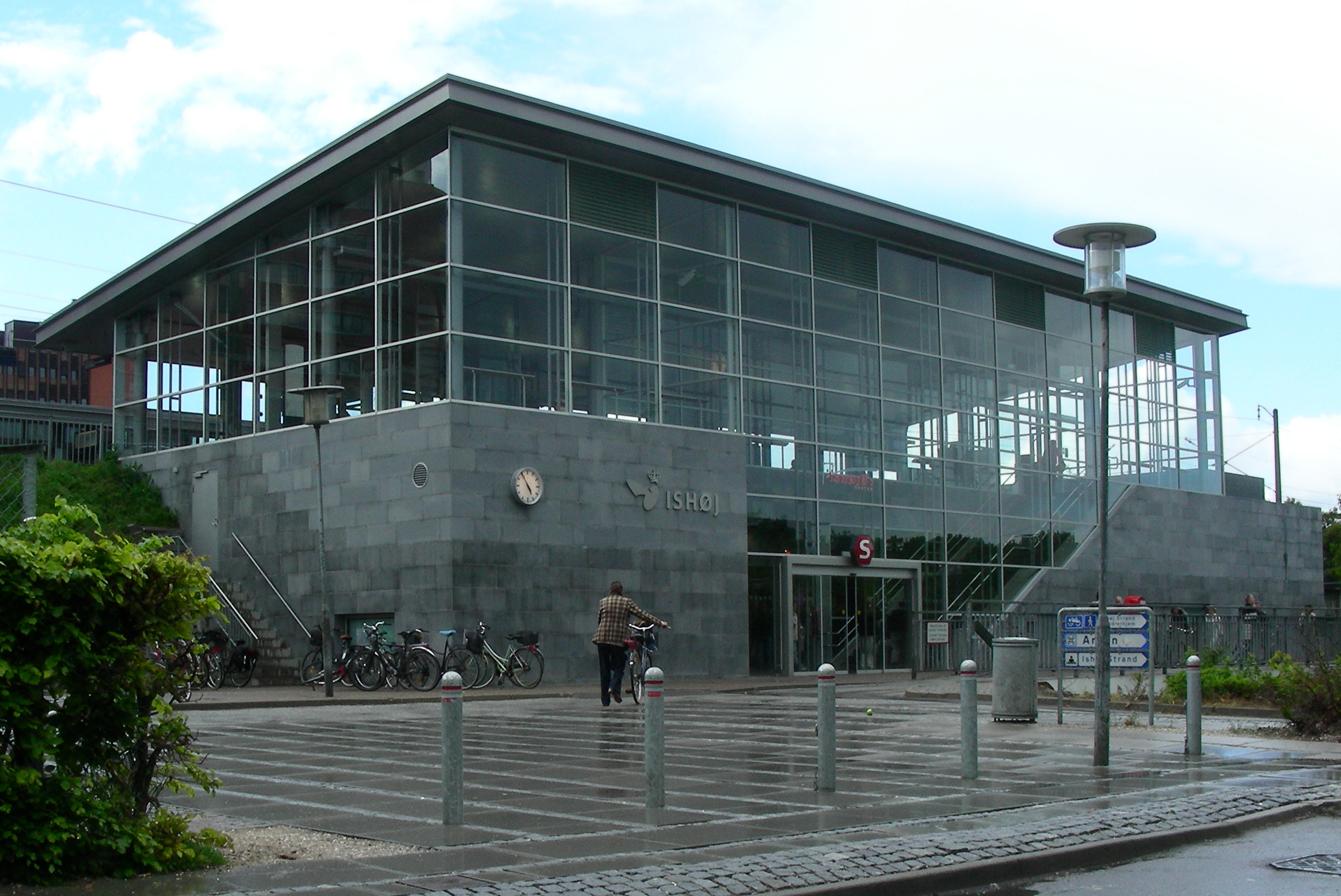
Ishøj train station

Ishøj Municipality (Danish: Ishøj Kommune) is a municipality (Danish: kommune) in the Capital Region on the island of Zealand (Sjælland) in eastern Denmark. The municipality covers 26 km^{2}, with a total population of 24,685 (1 January 2026). Its mayor is Merete Amdisen, a member of the Social Democrats (Socialdemokraterne) political party.

As of 2023, it has the highest share of people with a foreign-background in Denmark, with 44.2% having a foreign-background. 55.8% has a Danish-background, 16.3% Turkish, 5.6% Pakistani and 22.3% have another background (Polish, Nepali, Iraqi, Romanian, Indian, Moroccan and Bulgarian, among others).

The main town, and the site of the municipal council, is the town of Ishøj, which has one of Scandinavia's biggest housing projects - Vejleåparken (formerly Ishøjplanen). Other places are the villages of Ishøj Landsby and Torslunde.

Neighboring municipalities are Vallensbæk to the east, Høje-Taastrup to the north and west, and Greve to the south.

Ishøj Municipality was not merged with other municipalities on 1 January 2007 as part of nationwide Kommunalreformen ("The Municipal Reform" of 2007).

== Politics ==
=== Municipal council ===
Ishøj's municipal council consists of 19 members, elected every four years.

Below are the municipal councils elected since the Municipal Reform of 2007.

Election	Party						Total seats	Turnout	Elected mayor
Election	A	C	F	O	V	Ø	Total seats	Turnout	Elected mayor
2005	9	1	2	2	3		17	62.6%	Ole Bjørstorp (A)
2009	11	1	3	2	2		19	60.3%	Ole Bjørstorp (A)
2013	11		2	3	2	1	19	67.2%	Ole Bjørstorp (A)
2017	11		2	2	3	1	19	59.6%	Ole Bjørstorp (A)
Data from Kmdvalg.dk 2005, 2009, 2013 and 2017

== Notable people ==
- Gudrun Stig Aagaard (1895 in the village of Torslunde – 1986) a Danish textile artist who specialized in printed fabrics

== See also ==
- Ishøj station
- Køge Bugt Strandpark
- Arken Museum of Modern Art
