= Vallensbæk =

- Suburb
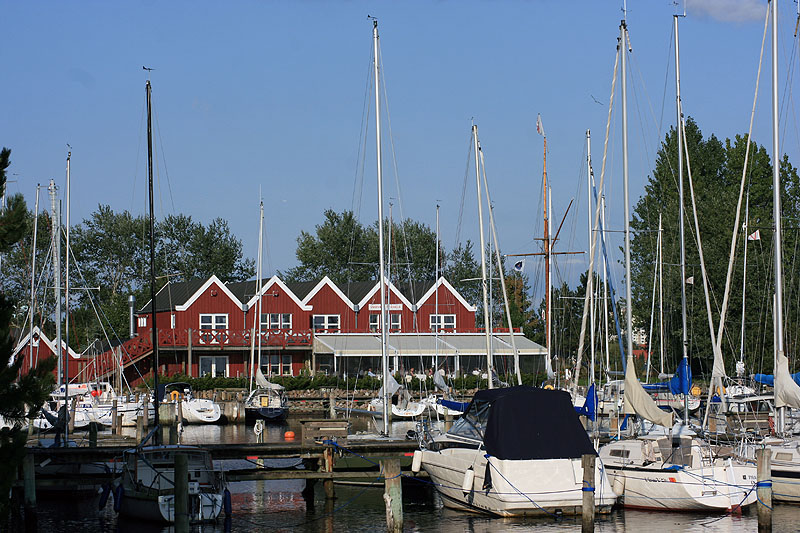
- Vallensbæk Harbour

- Location in the Capital Region of Denmark
- Coordinates: 55°37′26″N 12°23′13″E
- Country: Denmark
- Region: Capital Region
- Municipality: Vallensbæk

Population (2025)
  - Total: 17,724
- Time zone: UTC+1 (CET)
  - Summer (DST): UTC+2 (CEST)
- Postal code: 2625, 2665

Vallensbæk is a seaside western suburb of Copenhagen, Denmark. It is part of the Greater Copenhagen Area. It forms its own municipality, Vallensbæk Municipality, which is one of the smallest Danish municipalities. It borders Køge Bay, and the Køge Bay Beach Park (Danish: Køge Bugt Strandpark) along the coast. The suburb of Vallensbæk consists of two sections, not directly connected to each other: Vallensbæk Nordmark in the north and Vallensbæk Strand in the south. The two parts of the town are commonly referred to together as Vallensbæk.

== History ==
Vallensbæk is known from at least 1184, where it was mentioned as Wolensbech. The parish municipality (Danish: sognekommune) of Vallensbæk was founded in 1842.

The train station Vallensbæk station was the terminus of the first stage of the Køge Bay Line which opened in 1972. The opening of the train line kickstarted a suburban development of the area.

== Vallensbæk Nordmark ==
Vallensbæk Nordmark is almost entirely residential buildings, mainly detached houses, with a small industrial area and an area with schools and institutions. Vallensbæk Nordmark is connected to Albertslund.

== Vallensbæk Strand ==
In the northern part of Vallensæk Strand is an industrial area and many city blocks. The rest of Vallensbæk Strand are mainly detached houses. Near the center of Vallensbæk Strand is Vallensbæk station, as well as a number of amenities, schools and institutions. By the coast, not directly connected to Vallensbæk Strand, is a sizable marina. Next to the marina is Køge Bugt Strandpark, of which a small portion is in Vallensbæk Municipality. Vallensbæk Strand is connected to Brøndby Strand.

=== Marina and beach ===
Vallensbæk Marina is one of four marinas in the 7 km long Køge Bay Beach Park. Køge Bugt Strandpark is a park in Køge Bay. It is artificially made and was opened in 1980. It is located along the coast of the bay, in Greve, Ishøj, Vallensbæk and Brøndby municipalities. The beaches in Vallensbæk Municipality are administered by Ishøj Municipality.

The marina contains several restaurants as well as other facilities for sailors. The beach park offer good bathing facilities. It has room for approximately 600 boats.

=== Transport ===
Vallensbæk Strand is served by Vallensbæk railway station, located on the Køge Bugt radial of the Copenhagen's S-train network and served by the A-line. Vallensbæk Nordmark is served by Albertslund railway station, located on the Taastrup radial of the S-train network and served by the B-line.

The area is also served by the Køge Bugt Motorway in the south and the Holbæk Motorway in the north.

== Notable people ==
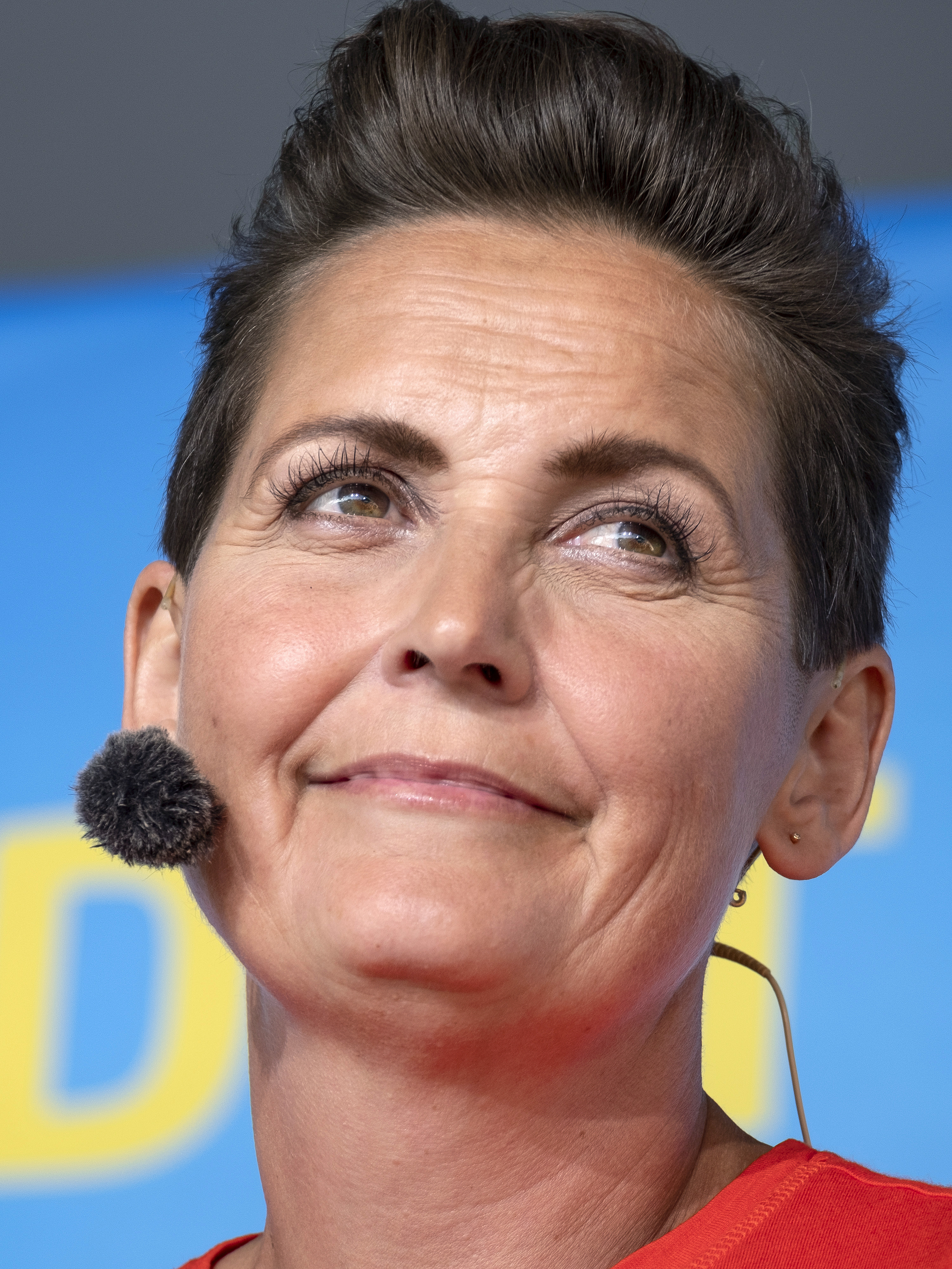
Pia Olsen Dyhr, 2019

- Niels Knudsen (1904—1987), architect
- Pia Olsen Dyhr (born 1971), politician, member of the Folketing and chairman of the Socialist People's Party
- Nicolai Wael (born 1972), football manager
- Amalie Wichmann (born 1995), handball player
