= Niels Knudsen =

Danish architect

- Born: 15 October 1904; Vallensbæk, Denmark
- Died: 12 August 1987 (aged 82); Søllerød, Denmark
- Occupation: Architect

Niels Knudsen (15 October 1904 – 12 August 1987) was a Danish architect known for his contributions to modern architecture. He gained recognition when his architectural work was featured in the art competition at the 1928 Summer Olympics. Although details of his Olympic submission are limited, his participation reflects the intersection of art and architecture during the era.
