= Henrik Rasmussen (politician) =

Danish politician

Mayor of Vallensbæk Municipality
- Incumbent
- Assumed office 29 March 2010
- Preceded by: Kurt Hockerup (C)

Member of the Folketing
- In office 4 January 2010 – 31 August 2010
- Constituency: Københavns Omegn

Personal details
- Born: 18 September 1971 (age 54) Glostrup, Denmark
- Party: Conservative People's Party

Henrik Bo Fomsgaard Rasmussen (born 18 September 1971) is a Danish politician. He became the mayor of Vallensbæk Municipality when the former mayor, Kurt Hockerup, died on 29 March 2010. He had been the deputy mayor since 2002. He remained the mayor after the 2013 and 2017 local elections. He has been in the municipal council for Vallensbæk Municipality since 1994. Rasmussen was in the Folketing for a brief period in 2010, but resigned after becoming the mayor of Vallensbæk Municipality. Before that he had also been a temporary member of the Folketing twice. His first period was from 29 November 2007 to 26 March 2008. His second period was from 1 December 2009 to 3 January 2010.
