= Køge Bugt Strandpark =

Park in Copenhagen, Denmark

Coordinates: 55.6065°N 12.3948°E

Køge Bugt Strandpark is a seaside public park in the western suburbs of Copenhagen, Denmark, reaching from Avedøre Holme in the northeast to Greve Strand in the southwest. It is about 7 km long and has an area of about 5 km2. Four marinas and the Arken Museum of Modern Art is located within the park.

== History ==
The first proposal to construct a new beach park at the site was made in 1936 with inspiration from Bellevue Beach on the coast north of Copenhagen. However construction would not begin until 1977 and the park was inaugurated in 1980. The new beach is constructed on natural sand bars 400 to 500 metre from the original coastline.

== Flora and fauna ==
The dunes were planted with 2.6 million Ammophila from Jutland's west coast and the rest of the area with 190,000 bushes and trees. The park has http://www.vhkb.dk/pdf_files/KB_Strandparken_folder_kort_2014.pdf also developed into an important habitat for birds.

== Marinas ==
- Brøndby Marina
- Vallensbæk Marina
- Ishøj Marina
- Hundige Marina
