= Strukturreformen =

2007 local government reforms in Denmark

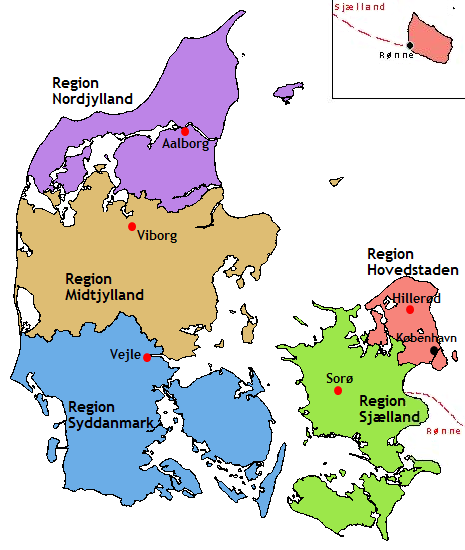
Denmark's regions

Denmark's municipalities

The Strukturreformen or Kommunalreformen (English: structural reform) meant large changes to the administrative structure of local government in Denmark. The reforms reduced 271 municipalities to 98 and replaced 13 counties with 5 regions. In addition, 14 state offices and Copenhagen's Overpræsidium were replaced by 5 state administrations. The Capital City Development Council (HUR) and the Capital City Hospital Association (H:S) were closed, and a number of other structures were reformed.

The reform was labelled the most radical reform of the political administrative system since the first democratic constitution in 1849. It was described by some as "the greatest centralization in Danish history since the introduction of the dictatorship".

The report was published on 9 January 2004 contained various proposals. One controversial reform was that the Danish government would take over the running of hospitals along with the total abolition of counties and replacement by regions. This was presented on 14 January 2004 in the Vingsted center in Egtved Municipality in the presence of almost 1,000 politicians, civil servants, administrative researchers and over 100 journalists. There was a majority in support for the reforms securing 94 seats out of the 179 seat Folketing after the Danish People's Party gave its support to the Venstre–Conservative People's Party coalition governments reform on 24 June 2004 in the Structure Agreement. The structural reform was adopted by the Danish Parliament on 16 June 2005 and entered into force on 26 June 2005 with the first election for the new municipalities and regions on 15 November 2005.

Immediately before the reform, the number of municipalities in Denmark had been reduced from 275 to 271, when the 5 municipalities in Bornholm County were merged after a local referendum on 29 May 2001. The new Bornholm Municipality came into being on 1 January 2003. This also reduced the number of county municipalities to 13. Ærø Municipality was part of the structural reform and was formed on 1 January 2006 by merging two municipalities so there were 270 municipalities. On 1 January 2007, 238 municipalities were merged into 66 new municipalities, and 13 county municipalities and 3 municipalities (Bornholm, Frederiksberg and Copenhagen) where the regions now own the hospitals in the region. The capital region also owns Sankt Hans Hospital which is located in Roskilde in Region Sjælland. From January 2027 the two regions in eastern Denmark will merge to form the Region of Eastern Denmark. In addition, 30 municipalities remained independent after 1 January 2007 and were thus not merged with other municipalities either immediately before or after 1 January 2007. Lolland and Sønderborg municipality consist of seven (7) old municipalities each, which is the highest among the newly formed municipalities. Ertholmene was not included in the reform, and is still today administered by the Ministry of Defence.

The structural reform replaced the structure of municipalities and county municipalities, which were introduced with the 1970 Danish Municipal Reform. An overview of both the old and the new structure can be seen on the page about Denmark's municipalities. The merged municipalities were decided in 2006 by an amalgamation committee, which consisted of the municipal board that was elected at the 2005 Danish local elections. In these municipalities, the election period for the old municipal councils was extended by one year, so that the old structure could function while the new one was set up.

== Background ==
In April 2004, the government (Venstre and Conservative People's Party) presented its proposal for a reform of the structure of the public sector : "The new Denmark - a simple public sector close to the citizen". This proposal was based on the Structure Commission's report. The Structure Commission had published the report on 9 January 2004. The report with various recommendations/proposals for the future number of regions/regional administrative levels - or none, since the state could take over the administration of hospitals - and municipalities was presented at a meeting for 900 politicians, civil servants, management researchers and interest organizations as well as 150 journalists on 14 January 2004 in the Vingsted center in the then Egtved Kommune near Vejle. The proposals subsequently formed the basis for negotiations between the government and the other parties in the Folketing. The negotiations resulted on 24 June 2004 in the Structural Agreement, an agreement on a reform between the government and the Danish People's Party. The structural agreement was three-pronged and included partly criteria for a new (geographical) division of municipalities and regions, partly a new distribution of tasks between municipalities, regions and the state and finally a financing and equalization reform.

Based on the framework agreement, 50 legislative proposals were drawn up during the autumn of 2004. The legislative package was sent for consultation on 1 December 2004. The legislative package was tabled in the Folketing on 24 February 2005 and was considered in the Folketing over the spring of 2005, after which the final votes took place in mid-June. In the final votes, in addition to the governing parties Venstre and the Conservative People's Party as well as the Danish People's Party, well over half of the bills were supported by several of the other parties in the Folketing. The structural reform was finally approved by the parties in the Danish Parliament on 16 June 2005 and entered into force on 26 June 2005 after publication in the Legislative Gazette. A ministerial order, which was signed on 29 June 2005 by Minister of the Interior and Health Lars Løkke Rasmussen, entered into force on 1 July 2005.

== Consequence changes ==
The counties are not the only structure based on the municipalities. Other structures are police districts, judicial districts, electoral districts and probate courts. As an example Brædstrup Municipality (today Horsens Municipality, Voerladegård however in Skanderborg Municipality), later became of the following five structures:

- Vejle County
- Horsens Police District (together with Horsens Municipality, Juelsminde Municipality, Hedensted Municipality, Tørring-Uldum Municipality, Nørre-Snede Municipality and Gedved Municipality)
- Brædstrup Retskreds (together with Nørre-Snede Municipality and Tørring-Uldum Municipality)
- The electoral district Givekredsen (together with Egtved Municipality, Give Municipality and Nørre-Snede Municipality)
- Them-Nørre Snede-Bræstrup Provsti (together with Them Municipality and Nørre-Snede Municipality)

All of these were therefore changed as a consequence of the Structural Reform.

== Municipalities through the period ==
The number of municipalities and population has varied quite a bit over time. In 1965, there were the most, namely 1345. There were 277 municipalities in Denmark from 1 April 1970 to and including 31 March 1974, the day before Sengeløse municipality, which had been established on 1 April 1970, became part of Høje-Taastrup Municipality and Store Magleby Parish and Dragør Parish became Dragør Municipality. From 1 April 1974 up to and including 31 December 2002, there were 275 municipalities in Denmark, then 271 municipalities up to and including 31 December 2005 (Bornholm had become one municipality), and 270 municipalities (Ærø had become one municipality) up to and including 31 December 2006. In addition to these two new municipalities, 30 municipalities remained independent after 1 January 2007. On 1 April 1972, many municipal boundaries were adjusted to a lesser extent, so that areas were taken over by other municipalities. April 1 was the effective date because the state and public sector fiscal years prior to January 1, 1979, began on April 1 (and ended on March 31 ). In 1976, the Danish Parliament passed the law, whereby the financial year became the same as the calendar year (January 1 to December 31), effective from 1 January 1979.

The municipalities distributed by population
| Number of inhabitants | Number of municipalities | | |
| Number of inhabitants | before 1 April 1970 | from 1 April 1974 | from 1 January 2007 |
|---|---|---|---|
| 150,000 - | 1 | 4 | 4 |
| 100,000 - 150,000 | 3 | 1 | 2 |
| 40,000 - 100,000 | 10 | 18 | 50 |
| 20,000 - 40,000 | 22 | 25 | 35 |
| 15,000 - 20,000 | 13 | 24 | 0 |
| 10,000 - 15,000 | 22 | 41 | 3 |
| 3,000 - 10,000 | 206 | 160 | 3 |
| 0 - 3,000 | 821 | 2 | 1 |
| In total | 1,098 | 275 | 98 |

== The new municipalities and regions ==
The 98 new municipalities came into existence on 1 January 2007. They henceforth functioned as the "entrance to the public sector". If residents are in doubt as to where a certain public service belongs after the municipal reform, they can contact their municipality.

=== Capital Region ===
The Capital Region of Denmark (Hovedstaden) has its administration in Hillerød, and consists of 29 new municipalities. It includes the old counties of Frederiksborg and Copenhagen, and the municipalities of Bornholm, Frederiksberg and Copenhagen (the latter 3 functioned both as municipalities and county municipalities, but their status as county municipalities lapsed after the reform).

Capital Region (1,645,825 inhabitants)
| New municipality | Previous | Notes |
|---|---|---|
| Albertslund | Albertslund | |
| Allerød | Allerød | Allerød first sought cooperation with Birkerød Municipality, but when they preferred co-operation with Søllerød Municipality, it was considered to seek a merger with Hillerød Municipality. However, the municipality's citizens decided in a referendum on 18 November 2004 to remain independent. |
| Ballerup | Ballerup | |
| Bornholm | Bornholm | Øen Bornholm bestod oprindeligt af fem kommuner og en amtskommune, men de blev efter The island of Bornholm originally consisted of five municipalities and one county, but after a local referendum on 29 May 2001 with 20,579 votes (73.97%) for and 7,242 (26.03%) against amalgamation, they were merged on 1 January 2003 four years before the nationwide Municipal Reform. During the amalgamation, the new municipality received special status as also being a county municipality, but this special status lapsed with the Municipal Reform, where it became part of the Capital Region. Due to its remote location, several tasks that in the rest of Denmark belong to the regions are handled by the municipality itself. Bornholm is e.g. its own employment region and has its own transport company, BAT. That is why the municipality is called a regional municipality: it constitutes its own region in many areas. |
| Brøndby | Brøndby | |
| Dragør | Dragør | Island cooperation agreement with Tårnby. |
| Egedal | Ledøje-Smørum, Stenløse, Ølstykke | |
| Fredensborg | Fredensborg-Humlebæk, Karlebo | Supervisor Thorkild Simonsen was appointed to investigate this amalgamation, as many citizens in Fredensborg-Humlebæk were deeply dissatisfied, and there was talk of dividing Fredensborg-Humlebæk, so that Humlebæk had come to Helsingør, while Fredensborg should have been incorporated into Hillerød Municipality. It was also considered to include Hørsholm in the merger. On 21 April 2005, however, the solicitor concluded that the merger should take place without any changes. |
| Frederiksberg | Frederiksberg | Special status as also being a county municipality ceases. |
| Frederikssund | Frederikssund, Jægerspris, Skibby, Slangerup (except Uvelse) | Uvelse Electoral District had voted with 56.9% for union with Hillerød instead, but Slangerup Municipality demanded at least 60%, and it was therefore rejected. However, the conciliation parties demanded a new vote with ordinary majority rules; this vote took place on 26 April 2005, and it again fell out in favor of Hillerød with 54.6% of the vote. |
| Furesø | Farum, Værløse | No municipalities wanted to merge with Farum municipality due to the Brixtofte case and Farum's poor finances, but both Værløse and Farum were too small to continue alone, so they were forced together by the settlement parties, albeit with financial compensation. |
| Gentofte | Gentofte | |
| Gladsaxe | Gladsaxe | |
| Glostrup | Glostrup | |
| Gribskov | Græsted-Gilleleje, Helsinge | |
| Halsnæs | Frederiksværk Municipality, Hundested Municipality | Originally called Frederiksværk-Hundested Municipality. At a referendum in May 2007, it was decided that the name should be Halsnæs Municipality. The vote was indicative, but the municipal council changed the name with effect from 1 January 2008. Rejected name proposals included Arresødal Municipality, Frederiksværk Municipality and Frederiksværk-Hundested Municipality. |
| Helsingør | Helsingør | The problems surrounding Fredensborg-Humlebæk/Karlebo could have had consequences for the municipality, but this did not happen. |
| Herlev | Herlev | |
| Hillerød | Hillerød Municipality, Skævinge Municipality | Uvelse Electoral District had voted with 56.9% for union with Hillerød instead, but Slangerup Municipality demanded at least 60%, and it was therefore rejected. However, the conciliation parties demanded a new vote with ordinary majority rules; this vote took place on 26 April 2005, and it again fell out in favor of Hillerød with 54.6% of the vote. Furthermore, the problems surrounding Fredensborg-Humlebæk/Karlebo could have had consequences for the formation of municipalities, but this did not happen. |
| Hvidovre | Hvidovre | |
| Høje-Taastrup | Høje-Taastrup | |
| Hørsholm | Hørsholm | The problems surrounding Fredensborg-Humlebæk/Karlebo could have had consequences for the municipality, but this did not happen. |
| Ishøj | Ishøj | Major partner in an Island cooperation agreement with Vallensbæk |
| Copenhagen | Copenhagen | Special status as Copenhagen County was abolished as an authority. |
| Lyngby-Taarbæk | Lyngby-Taarbæk | |
| Rudersdal | Birkerød Municipality, Søllerød | Birkerød's mayor had doubts about the financial benefits of the merger in the spring of 2005, and Birkerød City Council therefore called a referendum on the merger, which was held on 12 April 2005. 8,075 voted and 50.65% voted in favor, after which work on the merger continued. |
| Rødovre | Rødovre | |
| Tårnby | Tårnby | Major partner in an Island cooperation agreement with Dragør |
| Vallensbæk | Vallensbæk | Island cooperation agreement with Ishøj |

=== Central Jutland region ===
Central Denmark Region (Midtjylland) has its administration in Viborg, and consists of 19 new municipalities. It includes the old Ringkjøbing and Århus counties (the latter except for part of Mariager Municipality), and the northern parts of Vejle County and the southern parts of Viborg County.

Central Denmark Region (1,237,041 inhabitants)
| New municipality | Previous | Notes |
|---|---|---|
| Favrskov | Hadsten, Hinnerup, Hammel, Hvorslev, and also Granslev, Houlbjerg, and Laurbjerg parishes (all three in Langå) | Originally, Hadsten, Hammel and Hinnerup did not want to invite more people into the merger, after which Hvorslev Municipality was left alone without a merger partner. The conciliation parties sent representative Thorkild Simonsen to the area, who recommended a vote in Hvorslev Municipality and in the three southernmost parishes in Langå Municipality; this vote took place on 19 April 2005, and all three wanted to join Favrskov Municipality rather than the new municipalities of Viborg and Randers Municipality. |
| Hedensted | Hedensted, Juelsminde, Tørring-Uldum (except Grejs) | A referendum was held on 19 April 2005 in Grejs parish in Tørring-Uldum Municipality, where a full 72% voted to be merged with Vejle Municipality instead of Hedensted Municipality. |
| Herning | Aulum-Haderup, Herning, Trehøje, Aaskov | Supervisor Thorkild Simonsen was appointed to assess whether Ikast could be included in this new municipality after protests from citizen groups who wanted a merger of Ikast with Herning Municipality; however, on April 21, 2005, the Ombudsman reported that the problems with this solution outweighed the benefits. |
| Holstebro | Holstebro, Ulfborg-Vemb, Vinderup | Local representatives demanded a vote in Mogenstrup in Vinderup Municipality, but the citizens there chose Holstebro over Skive. |
| Horsens | Brædstrup (undtagen Voerladegård Sogn), Gedved, Horsens | The settlement parties demanded that a referendum be held in both Sønder Vissing and Voerladegård parishes. In the vote on 20 April 2005, Voerladegård voted for the new Skanderborg Municipality with 340 to 189, while Sønder Vissing voted for Horsens with 368 to 171. A referendum was held in Klovborg Sogn on 24 May 2005, to decide whether the parish should follow Nørre-Snede Municipality into Ikast-Brande, or be included instead in Horsens. The vote on 23 May gave a majority to follow the rest of the municipality to Ikast-Brande. |
| Ikast-Brande | Brande, Ikast, Nørre-Snede | Ombudsman Thorkild Simonsen was appointed to assess this municipal merger after protests from citizen groups who wanted a merger of Ikast with Herning Municipality; however, on 21 April 2005, he reported that the problems with this solution outweighed the benefits. On the same day, he also proposed a referendum in Klovborg Parish to let it merge with the new Horsens Municipality instead. A referendum was held in Klovborg Parish on 24 May 2005 to decide whether the parish should follow Nørre-Snede into Ikast-Brande Municipality, or instead be part of Horsens. The vote on 23 May gave a majority to follow the rest of the municipality to Ikast-Brande. |
| Lemvig | Lemvig, Thyborøn-Harboøre | |
| Norddjurs | Grenaa, Nørre Djurs, Rougsø, the eastern part of Sønderhald | |
| Odder | Odder | Odder and Århus share the responsibility of being the major partner in an Island cooperation agreement with Samsø. |
| Randers | Langå (except the three southernmost parishes), Nørhald, Purhus, Randers, and also the western part of Sønderhald, and the Havndal area from Mariager | The conciliation parties sent representative Thorkild Simonsen to Hvorslev and Langå, and he recommended a vote in Hvorslev Municipality and in the three southernmost parishes in Langå Municipality; this vote took place on 19 April 2005, and all of these wanted to join Favrskov Municipality rather than the new Viborg and Randers municipalities. |
| Ringkøbing-Skjern | Egvad, Holmsland, Ringkøbing, Skjern, Videbæk | Holmsland Municipality wanted to remain independent, but was nevertheless merged with the neighbouring municipalities due to the size of the population. |
| Samsø | Samsø | Island cooperation agreement with both Odder and Aarhus. |
| Silkeborg | Gjern, Kjellerup, Silkeborg, Them | |
| Skanderborg | Galten, Hørning, Ry, Skanderborg, Voerladegård Parish (from Brædstrup) | The settlement parties demanded that a referendum be held in both Sønder Vissing and Voerladegård Parish. In the vote on 20 April 2005, Voerladegård voted for Skanderborg with 340 to 189, while Sønder Vissing voted for Horsens with 368 to 171. |
| Skive | Sallingsund, Skive, Spøttrup, Sundsøre | Forligspartierne krævede afstemninger i Mogenstrup (fra Vinderup Kommune) og i Vestfjends (fra Fjends Kommune), men ingen af dem faldt ud til Skive Kommunes fordel. The settlement parties demanded votes in Mogenstrup (from Vinderup Municipality) and in Vestfjends (from Fjends Municipality), but neither of them fell out in favour of Skive Municipality. |
| Struer | Struer, Thyholm | |
| Syddjurs | Ebeltoft, Midtdjurs, Rosenholm, Rønde | |
| Viborg | Bjerringbro, Fjends, Karup, Møldrup, Tjele, Viborg | The settlement parties demanded a vote in Vestfjends in Fjends Municipality, but here a majority of almost 60% voted for Viborg. Gedsted (from Aalestrup Municipality) also voted to follow the rest of the municipality instead of joining Viborg, here with 603 votes against 593. |
| Aarhus | Aarhus | Aarhus and Odder share the responsibility of being the major partner in an Island cooperation agreement with Samsø Municipality. |

=== North Jutland region ===
North Jutland Region (Nordjylland) has its administration in Aalborg, and consists of 11 new municipalities. It includes the old North Jutland County, and northern parts of Viborg County and the parts of Mariager Municipality that did not come under Central Denmark Region.

North Jutland Region (578,839 inhabitants)
| New municipality | Previous | Notes |
|---|---|---|
| Brønderslev | Brønderslev, Dronninglund | Originally called Brønderslev-Dronninglund Municipality, but the municipal board shortened the name in January 2007. |
| Frederikshavn | Frederikshavn, Skagen, Sæby | Major partner in an Island cooperation agreement with Læsø. |
| Hjørring | Hirtshals, Hjørring, Løkken-Vrå, Sindal | |
| Jammerbugt | Brovst, Fjerritslev, Pandrup, Aabybro | |
| Læsø | Læsø | Island cooperation agreement with Frederikshavn. |
| Mariagerfjord | Arden, Hadsund, Hobro, Mariager (except Havndal electoral district), and also Hvilsom School district (from Aalestrup), and Snæbum Parish (from Nørager) | The settlement parties had demanded a referendum in Hvilsom, and this fell out in favour of Mariagerfjord Municipality with a majority of 60%. It was also possible that the vote in Nørager Municipality could have had consequences, but this did not happen. |
| Morsø | Morsø | |
| Rebild | Nørager, Skørping, Støvring | Thorkild Simonsen was sent to Nørager Municipality and recommended a vote on whether the municipality should go to Vesthimmerlands Municipality instead. This vote took place on 19 April in favor of Rebild Kommune. |
| Thisted | Hanstholm, Sydthy, Thisted | |
| Vesthimmerland | Farsø, Løgstør, Aalestrup (except Hvilsom School District), Aars | The settlement parties had demanded a referendum in Hvilsom School District and Gedsted School District (both Aalestrup Municipality); the former fell out in favour of Mariager Fjord with a majority of 60%, whereas the latter with a very small majority pointed to Vesthimmerlands Municipality. It was also possible that the vote in Nørager Municipality could have had consequences for Vesthimmerland. |
| Aalborg | Hals, Nibe, Sejlflod, Aalborg | |

=== Region Zealand ===
Region Zealand(Sjælland) has its administration in Sorø, and consists of 17 new municipalities. It includes the old counties of Roskilde, Storstrøm and Vestsjælland.

Region Zealand (819,427 inhabitants)
| New municipality | Previous | Notes |
|---|---|---|
| Faxe | Haslev, Fakse, Rønnede | |
| Greve | Greve | |
| Guldborgsund | Nykøbing Falster, Nysted, Nørre Alslev, Sakskøbing, Stubbekøbing, Sydfalster | Guldborgsund Municipality can be considered as one of the structural reform's most flexible and trustworthy mergers, according to News magazine Danske Kommuner in January 2006. The new municipality is an amalgamation of the six municipalities around Guldborgsund: The four Falster municipalities Nykøbing Falster, Nørre Alslev, Stubbekøbing and Sydfalster, and the two Eastern Lolland municipalities Nysted and Sakskøbing. |
| Holbæk | Holbæk, Jernløse, Svinninge, Tornved, Tølløse | |
| Kalundborg | Bjergsted, Gørlev, Hvidebæk, Høng, Kalundborg | |
| Køge | Køge, Skovbo | |
| Lejre | Bramsnæs, Hvalsø, Lejre | |
| Lolland | Holeby, Højreby, Maribo, Nakskov, Ravnsborg, Rudbjerg, Rødby | Originally, the plan was to form two municipalities: The new Maribo Municipality (Holeby, Højreby, Maribo, and Rødby Municipalities) and the new Nakskov Municipality (Nakskov, Ravneborg, and Rudbjerg Municipalities), but in a referendum on 18 May 2005 it was decided to merge all seven municipalities into one (the voting percentages were 51.6% in favor in Midtlolland and 54.9% in favor in Westlolland). |
| Næstved | Fuglebjerg, Fladså, Holmegaard, Næstved, Suså | |
| Odsherred | Dragsholm, Nykøbing-Rørvig, Trundholm | |
| Ringsted | Ringsted | |
| Roskilde | Gundsø, Ramsø, Roskilde | A vote was held in Gundsø Municipality on whether to go together with Stenløse and Ølstykke to the north or with Roskilde to the south. The result was that 60% preferred the merger with Roskilde Municipality. |
| Slagelse | Hashøj, Korsør, Skælskør, Slagelse | |
| Solrød | Solrød | |
| Sorø | Dianalund, Sorø, Stenlille | |
| Stevns | Vallø, Stevns | |
| Vordingborg | Langebæk, Møn, Præstø, Vordingborg | |

=== Southern Denmark ===
The Region of Southern Denmark(Syddanmark) has its administration in Vejle, and consists of 22 new municipalities. It includes the old counties of Funen, Ribe and South Jutland, and southern parts of Vejle County.

Region of Southern Denmark (1,194,659 inhabitants)
| New municipality | Previous | Notes |
|---|---|---|
| Assens | Assens, Glamsbjerg, Haarby, Tommerup, Vissenbjerg, Aarup | |
| Billund | Billund, Grindsted | Thorkild Simonsen proposed on 21 April 2005 to hold a referendum in Lindeballe and Ringive parishes (both in the old Give Municipality) to decide whether they should belong to Billund or Vejle. However, the settlement parties stated on the same occasion that Billund Airport (which before the reform was divided 50/50 between Billund and Vejle) will for the future be located entirely in Billund, regardless of the outcome of the referendum. The referendum on 23 May gave a majority for Vejle. |
| Esbjerg | Bramming, Esbjerg, Ribe | Major partner in an Island cooperation agreement with Fanø. The conciliation parties demanded a referendum in Grimstrup Parish (from the old Helle Municipality, which was planned to become part of Varde), which should decide whether the parish should be merged with the new Esbjerg Municipality instead. The vote took place on 12 April 2005, and fell with 54.2% against 44.7% in Varde's favour. Part of the parish, consisting of Grimstrup town itself, was, however, with 53.5% for Esbjerg against 44.9% for Varde allowed to go to Esbjerg. The Varde parts of Grimstrup Parish later became their own parish, Rousthøje, within Varde. |
| Fanø | Fanø | Island cooperation agreement with Esbjerg, after 65% of the municipality's citizens on 28 April 2005 voted for continued independence. |
| Fredericia | Fredericia | |
| Faaborg-Midtfyn | Broby, Faaborg, Ringe, Ryslinge, Årslev | |
| Haderslev | Gram, Haderslev, Vojens, and also Bevtoft Parish (from Nørre-Rangstrup), Bjerning Parish, Fjelstrup Parish and Hjerndrup Parish (from Christiansfeld Municipality) | Originally, the settlement parties demanded that a referendum be held in Bjerning Parish, Fjelstrup Parish and Hjerndrup Parish (all in Christiansfeld Municipality), so representative Thorkild Simonsen was sent there. On 4 May, he recommended that the entire Christiansfeld Municipality be given the opportunity to choose between the new Haderslev and Kolding Municipalities . However, the other parishes voted for Kolding on 23 May. |
| Kerteminde | Kerteminde, Langeskov, Munkebo | This municipality could also have included Flødstrup Parish (from Ullerslev Municipality), as the settlement parties demanded a referendum here, but in the vote on March 30, 2005, the parish voted 315 to 303 against Nyborg. |
| Kolding | Christiansfeld (except Bjerning, Fjelstrup and Hjerndrup Parishes), Kolding, Lunderskov, Vamdrup, and also Vester Nebel Parish (from Egtved Municipality) | The settlement parties demanded referendums in both Vester Nebel and Øster Starup Parishes (both from Egtved Municipality ); on 19 April 2005, a majority of 67% in Vester Nebel then voted for Kolding, whereas Øster Starup with a majority of 61% chose to go to Vejle with the rest of Egtved. In addition, the settlement parties originally demanded that a referendum be held in Bjerning, Fjelstrup and Hjerndrup Parishes (all in Christiansfeld Municipality ), but several parishes wanted to join Haderslev Municipality, so advocate Thorkild Simonsen was sent there. On 4 May, he recommended that the entire Christiansfeld Municipality be given the opportunity to choose between the new Haderslev and Kolding Municipalities . However, the other parishes voted for Kolding on 23 May. |
| Langeland | Rudkøbing, Sydlangeland, Tranekær | Island cooperation agreement with Svendborg. |
| Middelfart | Ejby, Middelfart, Nørre Aaby | |
| Nordfyn | Bogense, Otterup, Søndersø | Nordfyns Municipality was originally called Bogense Municipality, but in the election for the amalgamation committee, Nordfynslisten, a local list from Otterup, received two mandates. These would point to the mayoral candidate who was willing to call a vote on the municipality's name. Incoming mayor Bent Dyssemark (V) chose to call a vote, and the election pointed to Nordfyn Municipality. |
| Nyborg | Nyborg, Ullerslev, Ørbæk | This municipality could have lost Flødstrup Parish (in Ullerslev Municipality) when the settlement parties demanded a referendum here, but in the vote on 30 March 2005 the parish voted with 315 votes against 303 for Nyborg. |
| Odense | Odense | |
| Svendborg | Egebjerg, Gudme, Svendborg | Major partner in Island cooperation agreement with Langeland and Ærø. |
| Sønderborg | Augustenborg, Broager, Gråsten, Nordborg, Sønderborg, Sundeved, Sydals | |
| Tønder | Tønder, Bredebro, Højer, Løgumkloster, Nørre-Rangstrup (except Bevtoft Parish), Skærbæk . | The settlement parties had demanded a vote on Bevtoft Parish, and on 12 April 2005 the parish voted with 55.3% against 43.9% for Haderslev. |
| Varde | Blaabjerg, Blåvandshuk, Helle, Varde, Ølgod | The conciliation parties demanded a referendum in Grimstrup Parish, which would decide whether the parish should be merged with the new Esbjerg Municipality instead. The vote took place on 12 April 2005, and fell with 54.2% against 44.7% in Varde's favour. Part of the parish, consisting of Grimstrup town itself, was, however, with 53.5% for Esbjerg against 44.9% for Varde allowed to go to Esbjerg. |
| Vejen | Brørup, Holsted, Rødding, Vejen | |
| Vejle | Børkop, Egtved (except Vester Nebel Parish), Give, Jelling, Vejle, and also Grejs Parish (from Tørring-Uldum) | The settlement parties demanded referendums in both Vester Nebel and Øster Starup Parishes (both from Egtved Municipality); on 19 April 2005, a majority of 67% in Vester Nebel then voted for Kolding, whereas Øster Starup with a majority of 61% chose to go to Vejle with the rest of Egtved. Furthermore, Thorkild Simonsen proposed on 21 April 2005 to hold a referendum in Lindeballe and Ringive Parishes (both from Give Municipality) to decide whether they should end up in Billund or Vejle. However, the settlement parties stated on the same occasion that the entire Billund Airport (which before the reform was divided 50/50 between Billund Municipality and Vejle) should for the future be located entirely in Billund, regardless of the outcome of the referendum. Finally, a referendum was held on 19 April 2005 in Grejs Parish in Tørring-Uldum Municipality, where 72% voted to become part of Vejle instead of the new Hedensted Municipality . The referendum on 23 May gave a majority to follow the rest of the municipality to Vejle. |
| Ærø | Marstal, Ærøskøbing | Island cooperation agreement with Svendborg. The merger took place on 1 January 2006, i.e. 1 year before other mergers. |
| Aabenraa | Bov, Lundtoft, Rødekro, Tinglev, Aabenraa | |

== Reform of tax centres ==
Prior to the municipal reform, each municipality's tax system was organized individually or as voluntary agreements between several municipalities. With the municipal reform, this task was brought together in 30 tax centres and three call centres. The centres were located in the following cities:

- Ballerup
- Billund
- Bornholm
- Esbjerg
- Fredensborg-Humlebæk
- Frederikssund
- Grenå
- Haderslev
- Herning
- Holbæk
- Horsens
- Hjørring, where a call centre was established
- Høje-Taastrup
- Corsair
- Copenhagen
- Køge
- Maribo
- Middelfart
- Næstved
- Odense, where a call centre was established
- Randers
- Roskilde, where a call centre was established
- Skive
- Struer
- Svendborg
- Sollerød
- Thisted
- Tønder
- Aalborg
- Aarhus

== Results ==
The purpose of the reform was "to create a new Denmark, where a strong and future-proof public sector solves the tasks with high quality and as close to the citizens as possible." Subsequent polls from 2010 showed that approx. 50% of the respondents stated that the municipalities' service had noticeably deteriorated and that the distance to the municipal politicians was significantly greater.

In the first ten years after the structural reform, 325 primary schools were closed, or approximately one in five. In 2006, there were 1,601 primary schools and special schools in Denmark, while in 2021 there were 1,203 (of which 1,080 primary schools and 123 special schools). There are often school closures, school mergers, but also the division of schools into several independent schools. In 2021, Holbæk Municipality split up 4 independent primary schools, so that they became 11 independent primary schools.

The number of full-time employees in the municipalities fell from 424,000 in 2007 to 401,000 in 2016. On the other hand, the number of Djøfs grew from 3,781 in 2007 to 6,373 in 2014.

== See also ==
- Municipal reform in Norway
- Regional reform in Norway
- Regional health authority (Norway)
- 2015 Norway police reform
- Administrative reform in Estonia
- 2001 Holstebro and Struer referendum
- 2001 Bornholm referendum

== Literature ==
- Erik Harder: Dansk kommunestyre i grundtræk. 4. udgave. København 1985. Forlaget Kommuneinformation. ISBN 87-7316-211-6
- Ove Hansen: Sådan styres kommunen. 1. udgave. 1. oplag. 1978. AOF's Forlag og Forlaget Fremad. ISBN 87-7403-131-7
