= ISO 3166-2:DK =

Entry for Denmark in ISO 3166-2

ISO 3166-2:DK is the entry for Denmark in ISO 3166-2, part of the ISO 3166 standard published by the International Organization for Standardization (ISO), which defines codes for the names of the principal subdivisions (e.g., provinces or states) of all countries coded in ISO 3166-1.

The current version of the standard defines codes for the five regions of Denmark created during the municipal reform of 2007.

Each code consists of two parts, separated by a hyphen. The first part is DK, the ISO 3166-1 alpha-2 code for Denmark. The second part is a two-digit number between 81 and 85.

== Current codes ==
The five regions of Denmark (inset is the island of Bornholm)

Subdivision names are listed as shown in the ISO 3166-2 standard, published by the ISO 3166 Maintenance Agency.

In 2011, by request of the Danish Government, the prefix Region was removed from the name of each subdivision and the list was re-sorted to show the names in Danish alphabetical order (a–z, æ, ø, å) rather than numerical sequence.

Code	Subdivision name (da) post-2011	Subdivision name (da) 2007–2011	Subdivision name (en) (Note: For reference only, English name not included in the ISO 3166-2 standard.)
DK-84	Hovedstaden	Region Hovedstaden	Capital
DK-82	Midtjylland	Region Midjylland	Central Denmark
DK-81	Nordjylland	Region Nordjylland	North Denmark
DK-85	Sjælland	Region Sjælland	Zealand
DK-83	Syddanmark	Region Syddanmark	South Denmark

Notes

The autonomous territories of Faroe Islands and Greenland have their own ISO 3166-1 codes and are not included in Denmark's entry in ISO 3166-2.

== Earlier codes ==
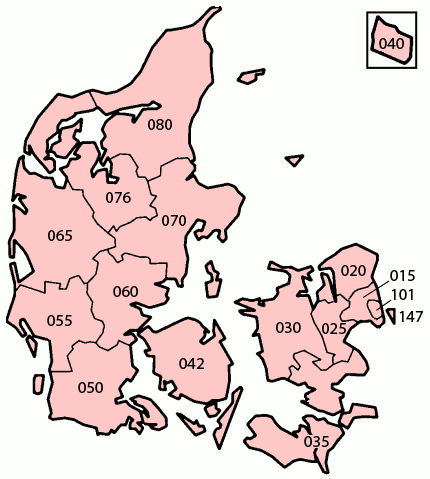
The 16 subdivisions of Denmark, as existed immediately prior to 2007

The first edition of ISO 3166-2, published in 1998, defined codes for 14 counties (Danish: amter), and two municipalities (kommuner) with county status:

Former code	Subdivision name	Subdivision category
DK-015	København	county
DK-020	Frederiksborg	county
DK-025	Roskilde	county
DK-030	Vestsjælland	county
DK-035	Storstrøm	county
DK-040	Bornholm	county (regional municipality 2003–2007)
DK-042	Fyn	county
DK-050	Sønderjylland	county
DK-055	Ribe	county
DK-060	Vejle	county
DK-065	Ringkøbing	county
DK-070	Århus	county
DK-076	Viborg	county
DK-080	Nordjylland	county
DK-101	København	municipality
DK-147	Frederiksberg	municipality

== See also ==
- ISO 3166-2:GL
- ISO 3166-2:FO
- Subdivisions of Denmark
- Subdivisions of Greenland
- Subdivisions of the Faroe Islands
- FIPS region codes of Denmark
- NUTS codes of Denmark
- Neighbouring country: DE
