= Skibet =

Populated place in Denmark

- Town
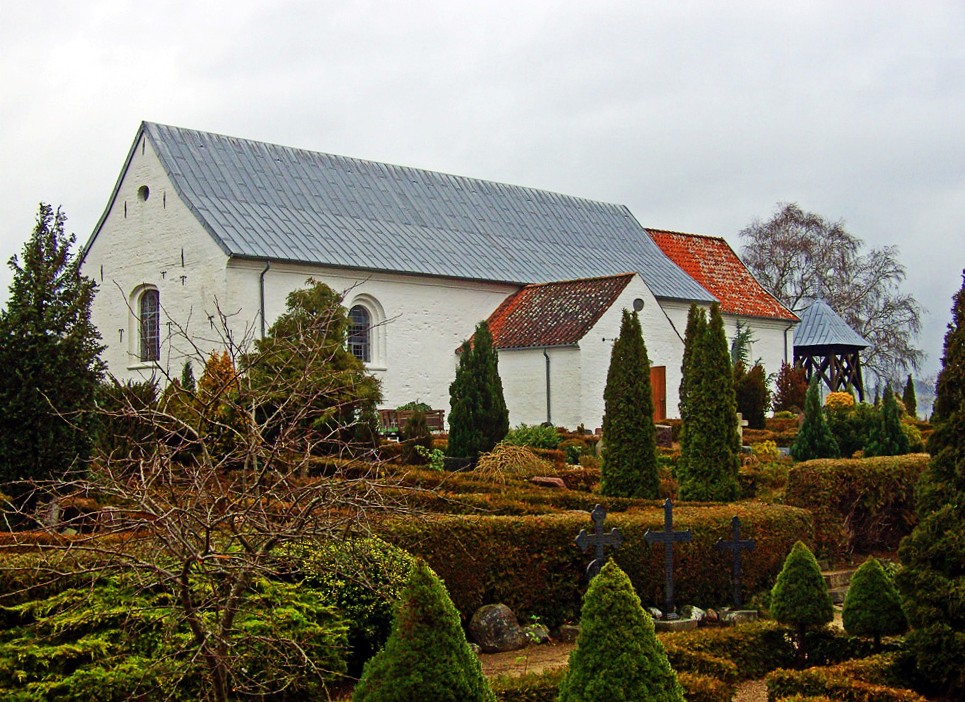
- Skibet Church

- Location in Denmark Skibet (Region of Southern Denmark)
- Coordinates: 55°42′40″N 9°27′19″E
- Country: Denmark
- Region: Southern Denmark
- Municipality: Vejle Municipality

Area
  - Urban: 1.5 km^{2} (0.58 sq mi)

Population (1. January 2026)
  - Urban: 2,609
  - Urban density: 1,700/km^{2} (4,500/sq mi)
- Time zone: UTC+1 (CET)
  - Summer (DST): UTC+2 (CEST)
- Postal code: DK-7100 Vejle

Skibet is a Danish town, with a population of 2,609 (2026), located 6 kilometres (3.7 mi) west of the municipal seat and regional capital Vejle in the Region of Southern Denmark.

The town lies at the bottom of a valley, where the road to Billund and Grindsted (primary route 28) comes closest to Vejle River.

The church building from 1150 AD is located in the southwestern corner of the town.

The former manor Haraldskær, which is now a hotel, is located just outside of the town.

Skibet had a small railway stop on the Vejle-Vandel-Grindsted railway, which was opened to Vandel in 1897 and extended to Grindsted in 1914. The line was closed in 1957, and the station building has been demolished, but on the line's route is the Bindeballestien, which is asphalted from Vejle to Ravning, from where it continues as a gravel path almost to Bindeballe Station.
