= Greater Copenhagen Authority =

The Greater Copenhagen Authority (Danish: Hovedstadens Udviklingsråd often abbreviated HUR, literally: The Capital's Development Council) was a politically governed organisation deciding regional development plans for the Metropolitan Copenhagen area, Denmark. The council started work in July 2000 and was, together with the counties and the Copenhagen Hospital Corporation, abolished in the Municipality reform of 2007.

It had six areas to run and develop:

- public transport
- regional and traffic planning
- Oresund co-ordination and development
- industrial policy
- tourism
- cultural life

== Regional plan 2005 ==
The regional plan for 2005 includes these development areas:

- boost recreational areas to get the world’s best
- providing enough plots and building opportunities to ensure a rich and varied housing selection
- better business environment
- efficient infrastructure for all forms of transport

The plan was decided after well-attended public meetings.

== Reform of 2007 ==
Due to the Municipality reform of 2007 the traffic authority part of HUR was joined with the two other traffic authorities of Zealand, STS and VT, and renamed to Movia. The regional planning part of HUR is now governed by Region Hovedstaden, except for the former Roskilde Amt, which is part of Region Sjælland.
