= Smidstrup, Vejle Municipality =

Smidstrup
- Village
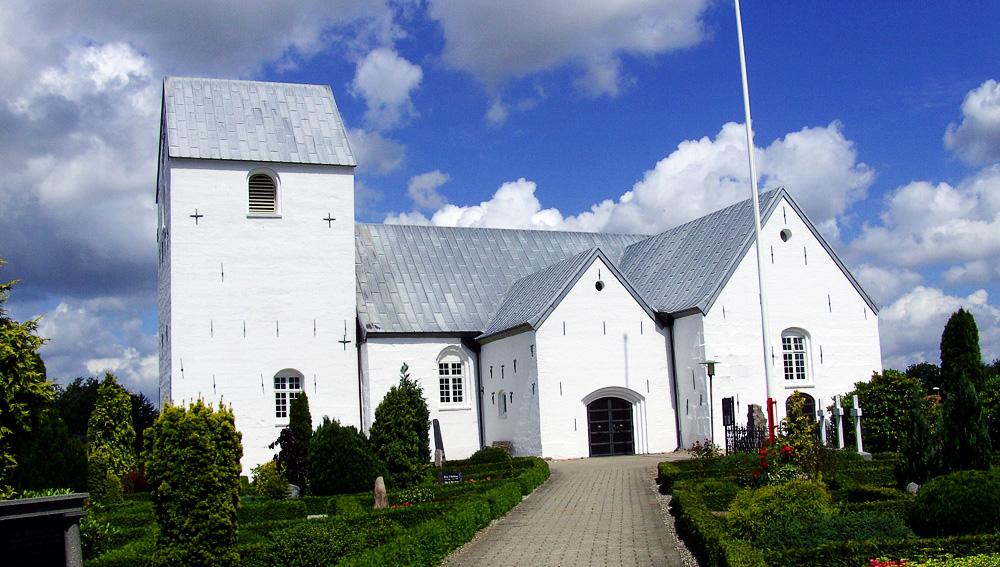
- Smidstrup Church

- Location in Region of Southern Denmark Smidstrup (Denmark)
- Coordinates: 55°36′54″N 9°34′2″E
- Country: Denmark
- Region: Southern Denmark
- Municipality: Vejle Municipality

Population (2026)
  - Total: 849
- Postal code: DK-7000 Fredericia

Smidstrup is a village, with a population of 849 (1 January 2026), in Vejle Municipality, Region of Southern Denmark in Denmark.

Smidstrup is located 14 km south of Vejle, 15 km west of Fredericia and 20 km north of Kolding.

Smidstrup Church and Smidstrup Local Heritage Museum are located in the village.
