= Ringkjøbing =

Ringkjøbing can refer to:

- Ringkjøbing County
- Ringkøbing, its capital
