= Hovedstadens Sygehusfællesskab =

Defunct Danish health trust

Hovedstadens Sygehusfællesskab (H:S) was a Danish health trust which was founded on 1 January 1995 to run health care services in Copenhagen and Frederiksberg. There were five hospitals under its command.

After the structural reform, Hovedstadens Sygehusfællesskab was closed down, and from 2006, its responsibilities were passed to Region Hovedstaden.
