= Tørring-Uldum Municipality =

Former municipality in Denmark

Coordinates: 55°50′56″N 9°35′24″E

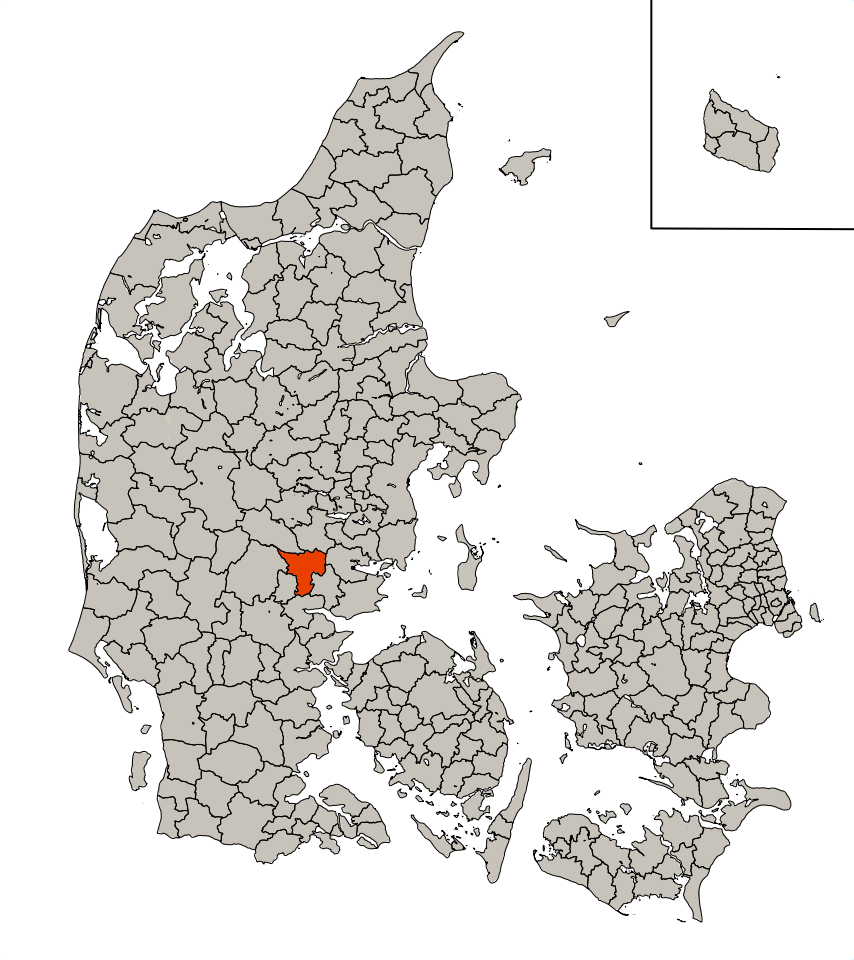

Until 1 January 2007 Tørring-Uldum municipality was a municipality (Danish, kommune) in the former Vejle County on the Jutland peninsula in central Denmark. The municipality covered an area of 189 km^{2}, and had a total population of 12,519 (2005). Its last mayor was Kirsten Terkelsen, a member of the Venstre (Liberal Party) political party. The site of its municipal council was the town of Uldum. The largest town in the municipality was Tørring.

Tørring-Uldum municipality was, as a result of Kommunalreformen ("The Municipality Reform" of 2007), merged with other municipalities. Most of Tørring-Uldum was merged with Juelsminde municipality and Hedensted municipality to form a new Hedensted municipality. This created a municipality with an area of 565 km^{2} and a total population of 56,508 (2005). A smaller portion of Tørring-Uldum, however, was split off and merged into the new Vejle municipality. The new municipalities belong to Region Midtjylland ("Mid-Jutland Region").
