= Gedved Municipality =

Former municipality in Vejle, Denmark

Coordinates: 55.9294°N 9.8456°E

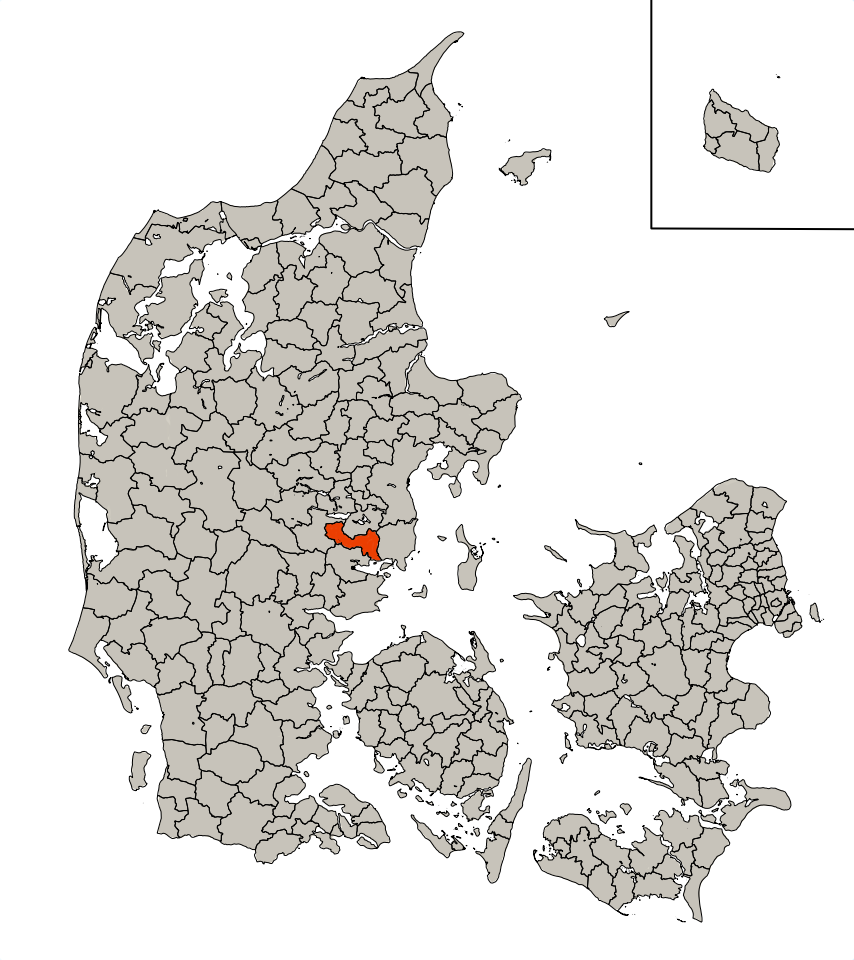
History of Gedved Kommune (1970-2006)

Until 1 January 2007, Gedved municipality was a municipality (Danish, kommune) in Vejle County on the Jutland peninsula in central Denmark. The municipality covered an area of 151 km², and had a total population of 10,215 (2005). Its last mayor was Ejgil W. Rasmussen, a member of the Venstre (Liberal Party) political party. The main town and the site of its municipal council was the town of Gedved.

Gedved municipality ceased to exist as the result of Kommunalreformen ("The Municipality Reform" of 2007). It was merged with existing Brædstrup (with the exception of Voerladegård Parish) and Horsens municipalities to form a new Horsens municipality. This created a municipality with an area of 542 km² and a total population of approx. 80,000 (2005) in Region Midtjylland.
