= Nørre-Snede Municipality =

Former municipality in Denmark

Coordinates: 55°57′52″N 9°23′35″E

Until 1 January 2007 Nørre-Snede was a municipality (Danish, kommune) in the former Vejle County on the Jutland peninsula in central Denmark. The municipality covered an area of 254 km^{2} (98 sq mi), and had a total population of 7,266 (2005). Its last mayor was Uffe Henneberg, a member of the Venstre (Liberal Party) political party. The main town and the site of its municipal council was the town of Nørre Snede.

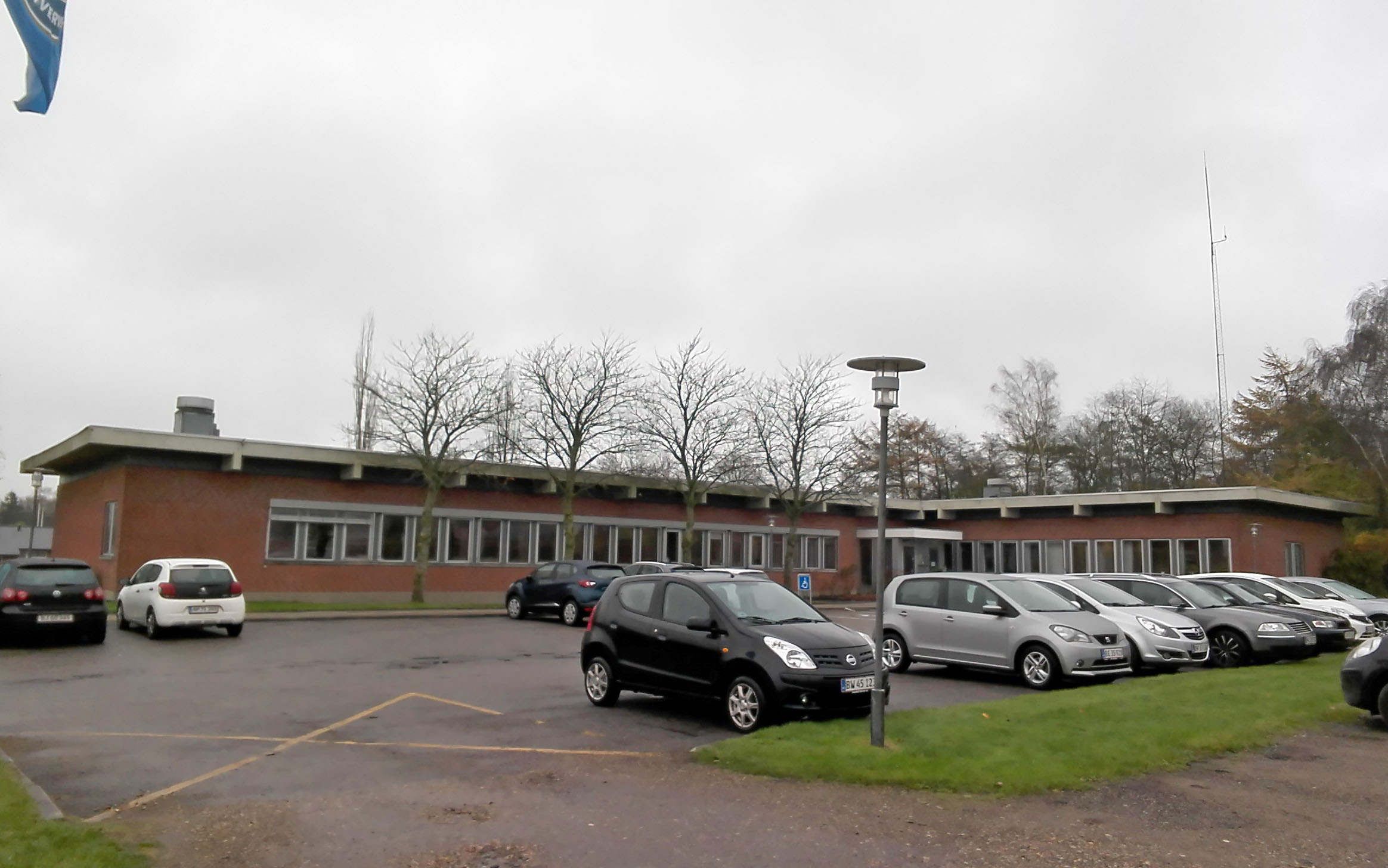
The former townhall of Nørre Snede Municipality in Nørre Snede

The municipality was created in 1970 as the result of a kommunalreform ("Municipality Reform") that merged a number of existing parishes:

- Ejstrup Parish
- Klovborg Parish
- Nørre-Snede Parish

Nørre-Snede municipality ceased to exist as the result of Kommunalreformen ("The Municipality Reform" of 2007). It was merged with existing Brande and Ikast municipalities to form the new Ikast-Brande municipality. This created a municipality with an area of 768 km^{2} (297 sq mi) and a total population of 39,371 (2005). The new municipality belonged to Region Midtjylland ("Mid-Jutland Region").

== Notable people ==
- Jes Bertelsen (born 1946), spiritual teacher and author
