= Vinderup Municipality =

Former municipality in Denmark

Coordinates: 56.478°N 8.777°E

Vinderup Municipality is a former municipality (Danish, kommune) in Region Midtjylland on the Jutland peninsula in west Denmark. The former Vinderup municipality covered an area of 224 km^{2}, and had a total population of 8,035 (2005). Its last mayor was Holger Hedegaard, a member of the Venstre (Liberal Party) political party. The main town of the municipality was the railway town of Vinderup.

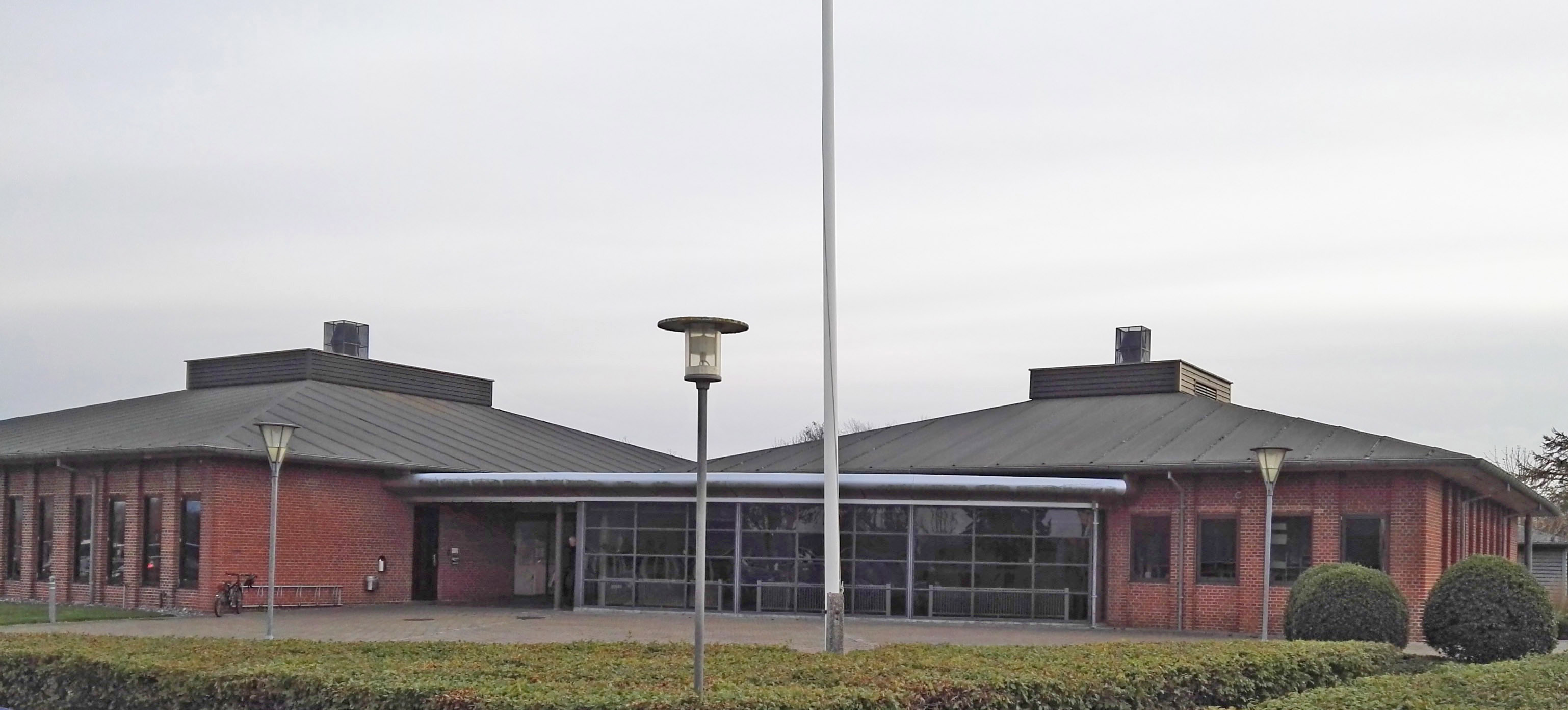
The former townhall of Vinderup Municipality

The municipality was created in 1970 due to a kommunalreform ("Municipality Reform") that combined a number of existing parishes:

- Ejsing Parish
- Handbjerg Parish
- Ryde Parish
- Sahl Parish
- Sevel Parish
- Trandum Parish
- Vinderup Parish.

On 1 January 2007 Vinderup municipality ceased to exist due to Kommunalreformen ("The Municipality Reform" of 2007). It was merged with Holstebro and Ulfborg-Vemb municipalities to form an enlarged Holstebro municipality. This created a municipality with an area of 790 km^{2} and a total population of 56,204.
