= Børkop Municipality =

Former municipality in Vejle, Denmark

Coordinates: 55°38′30″N 9°39′1″E

Until 1 January 2007, Børkop municipality was a municipality (Danish, kommune) in Vejle County on the east coast of the Jutland peninsula in southeast Denmark. The municipality covered an area of 103 km^{2}, and had a total population of 11,478 (2005). Its last mayor was Leif Skov, a member of the Social Democrats (Socialdemokraterne) political party.

The main town and the site of its municipal council was the town of Børkop, which is located approximately halfway between the cities of Vejle and Fredericia.

The municipality was created in 1970 due to a kommunalreform ("Municipality Reform") that combined the following parishes: Gauerslund, Gårslev, Skærup, and Smidstrup parishes.

Børkop municipality ceased to exist as the result of Kommunalreformen ("The Municipality Reform" of 2007). It was merged with Egtved, Give, Jelling, and Vejle municipalities to form a new Vejle municipality. This created a municipality with an area of 1,055 km^{2} and a total population of 82,935 (2005). The new municipality belongs to Region of Southern Denmark.
