= List of Danish regions by Human Development Index =

Map of the Danish regions by Human Development Index by HDI in 2017. Legend: > 0.950 0.925 – 0.950 0.915 – 0.925 0.905 – 0.915 < 0.905

This is a list of regions of Denmark by Human Development Index as of 2023 with data for the year 2022.

There are 5 regions of Denmark in total, all of which exceed very high development on the Human Development Index. In 2023, The Capital Region of Denmark had the highest development of any region. Denmark was ranked 5th on the Human Development globally in 2022.

| Rank | Region | HDI (2023) |
Very high human development
| 1 | Capital Region of Denmark | 0.971 |
| – | Denmark | 0.962 |
| 2 | Central Denmark Region | 0.959 |
| 3 | Region of Southern Denmark | 0.948 |
| 4 | North Jutland Region | 0.941 |
| 5 | Region Zealand | 0.929 |
