= Ikast Municipality =

Former municipality of Denmark

Coordinates: 56°08′27″N 9°09′06″E

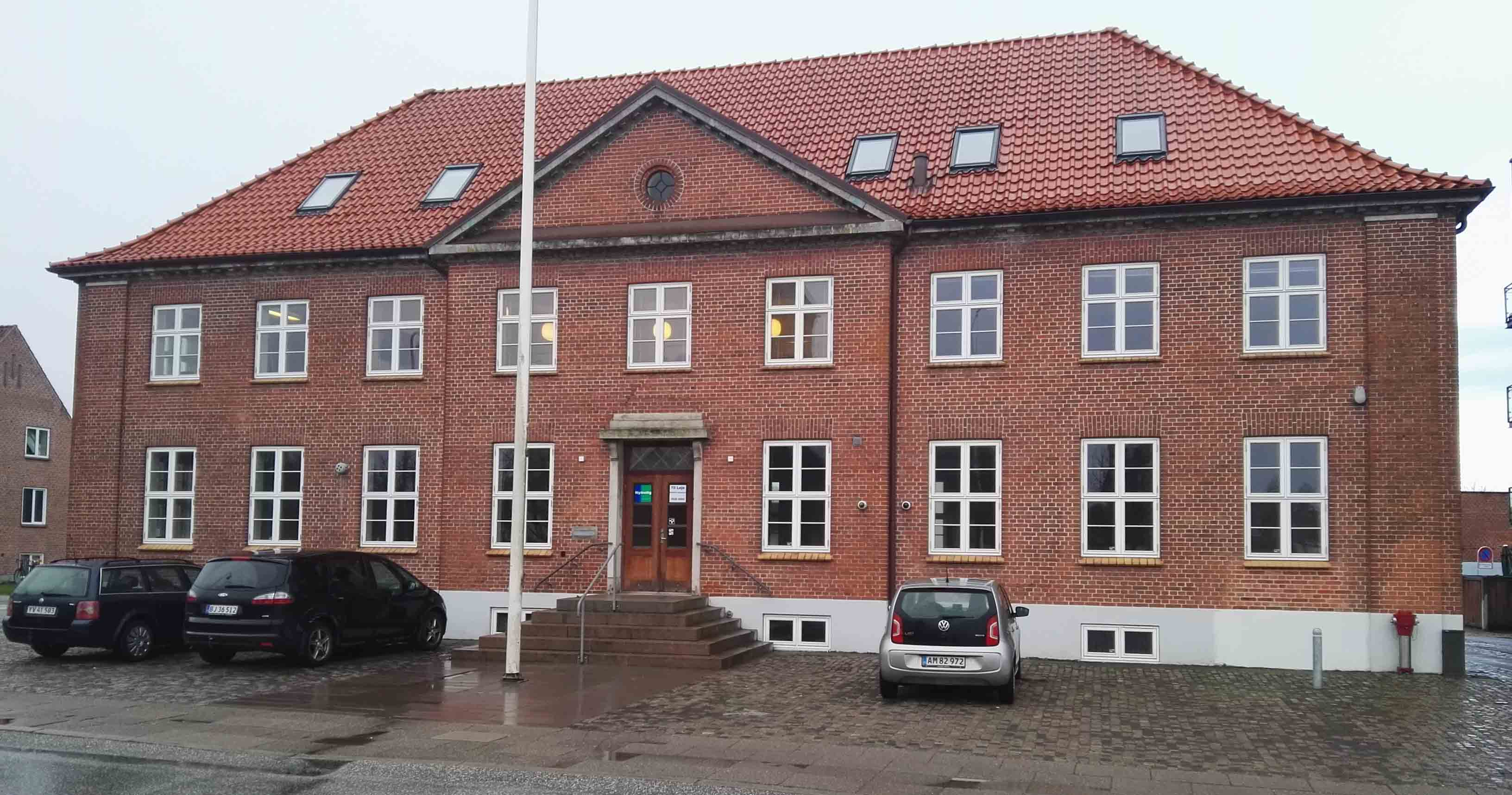

Ikast municipality was a municipality (Danish, kommune) in Ringkøbing on the Jutland peninsula in west Denmark. The municipality covered an area of 294.3 km^{2}, and had a total population of 23,283 (2005). Its last mayor was Carsten Kissmeyer, a member of the Venstre (Liberal Party) political party. The main town and the site of its municipal council was the town of Ikast.

The municipality was created in 1970 as the result of a kommunalreform ("Municipality Reform") that merged a number of existing parishes:

- Bording Parish
- Engesvang Parish
- Ikast Parish
- Isenvad Parish

Ikast municipality ceased to exist as the result of Kommunalreformen ("The Municipality Reform" of 2007). It was merged with existing Brande and Nørre-Snede municipalities to form the new Ikast-Brande municipality. This created a municipality with an area of 768 km^{2} and a total population of 39,371 (2005). The new municipality belongs to Region Midtjylland ("Mid-Jutland Region").
