= Jelling Municipality =

Former municipality in Vejle, Denmark

Coordinates: 55°45′00″N 9°26′00″E

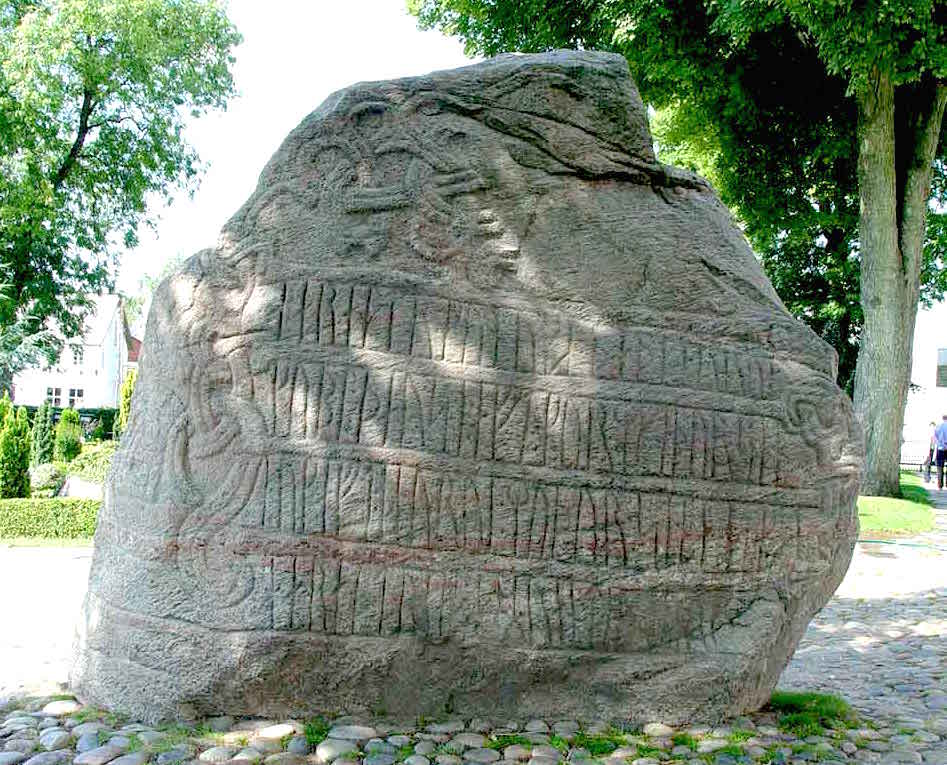
Runeside of Harald Bluetooth's great Jelling stone at the church in Jelling, Denmark.

Jelling municipality was, from 1970 until 1 January 2007, a municipality (Danish: kommune) in Vejle County on the Jutland peninsula in south-west Denmark. In 2007 it merged into the newly formed Vejle municipality.

== History ==
The Jelling municipality covered an area of 89 km^{2}, and had a total population of 5,697 (2005). Its last mayor was Arne H. Sigtenbjerggaard, a member of the Venstre (Liberal Party) political party. The main town and the site of its municipal council was the town of Jelling.

The municipality was created in 1970 due to a kommunalreform ("Municipality Reform") that combined a number of existing parishes:

- Hvejsel Parish
- Jelling Parish
- Kollerup Parish
- Vindelev Parish

=== Merger ===
Jelling municipality ceased to exist as the result of Kommunalreformen ("The Municipality Reform" of 2007). It was merged with Børkop, Egtved, Give, and Vejle municipalities to form a new Vejle municipality. This created a municipality with an area of 1,055 km^{2} and a total population of 82,935 (2005). The new municipality belongs to Region of Southern Denmark.

=== Features ===
Located in the former Jelling municipality are the runic gravestones— the Jelling stones, the burial mounds, and church which became a UNESCO World Heritage Site in 1994.
