= Regions of Denmark =

Administrative territorial entity of Denmark

Regions of Denmark Regioner (Danish)
- Category: Unitary state
- Location: Kingdom of Denmark
- Number: 5 (Note: The government is working towards having 4 regions by the 2025 Danish Local Elections) (as of 17 September 2024)
- Government: Regional Council (Regionsråd)
- Subdivisions: Municipality (Kommuner)

The five regions of Denmark (Danish: regioner) were created as administrative entities at a level above the municipalities and below the central government in the public sector as part of the 2007 Danish Municipal Reform, when the 13 counties (amter) were abolished. At the same time, the number of municipalities (kommuner) was cut from 270 (from 271 in 2006) to 98. The reform was approved and made into a law by the lawmakers in the Folketing 26 June 2005 with elections to the 98 municipalities and 5 regions being held Tuesday 15 November 2005.

Each of the five regions is governed by a popularly elected regional council with 41 members, from whom the regional chairperson is chosen. This is 205 members in total. The number of regions will be reduced to four from 1 January 2027. The number of council members elected will change to between 25 and 47 in the 2025 Danish local elections for a total of 134 in the four regional councils that will then be elected.

The main responsibility of the regions is healthcare. Lesser powers of the regions include public transport, environmental planning, soil pollution management and some coordination of secondary education.

In contrast to the former counties (1970–2006), the regions do not have municipal powers. Regions cannot levy taxes, but are financed partly by block grants from the central government (until 2018 sundhedsafgift, i.e. health tax) and partly by taxes collected by their constituent municipalities. Regions cannot decide their budgets independently, but must use the block grant for the purposes that are specified by the central government. In other words, the regional powers were dramatically reduced in favor of the local level. As they are not municipalities, regions are not allowed to have coats of arms, but they do have modern logos.

The small archipelago of Ertholmene to the northeast of Bornholm is not part of any region or municipality. Its inhabitants do not pay municipal taxes, nor did they pay the central government's health care contribution tax (2007 until 2018) or the tax levied by counties prior to 2007.

The representative organisation Danske Regioner was set up on 23 March 2006. It is an advocacy and lobbying organisation speaking on behalf of all of the regions, including negotiating labour contracts, etc. The organization also maintains an office in Brussels (as did its predecessor, Amtsrådsforeningen). As a central representation of the Danish healthcare system, it has rather large, although unofficial, powers. Its equivalent before 2006 was Amtsrådsforeningen (ARF), the organisation of county representations, which had a comparatively greater power.

The government is currently working on merging the Zealand Region and Capital Region into one region named Eastern Denmark from 1 January 2027. The council in the merged region will have 47 members elected in the 2025 Danish local elections. They will meet in the present-day capital of Region Sjælland seat, the town of Sorø. The law setting up the new region has been approved by the lawmakers of the national parliament the Folketing, and signed by the head of state 20 June 2025.

== List of regions ==
Population numbers in this table will not be updated. For 1 January population every year, see below Regions of Denmark#Population growth.

Danish name (literal translation)	Self-appellation in English^{a}	Seat of administration (largest city if different)	Chairman	Population^{b} (2022-01-01)	Total area^{b} (km^{2})	Pop. density (per km^{2})	Former counties (1970–2006)
Region Hovedstaden ("Capital City Region")	Capital Region of Denmark	Hillerød (Copenhagen)	Lars Gaardhøj	1,867,948	2,546.3	733.59	Counties: Copenhagen, Frederiksborg; municipalities: Copenhagen, Frederiksberg, Bornholm
Region Midtjylland ("Mid Jutland Region")	Central Denmark Region	Viborg (Aarhus)	Anders Kühnau	1,341,857	13,000.2	103.21	Ringkjøbing, nearly all of Århus, the southern part of Viborg and the northern part of Vejle
Region Nordjylland ("North Jutland Region")	North Denmark Region	Aalborg	Mads Duedahl	591,740	7,874	75.15	North Jutland, the northern part of Viborg County and a small part of Århus County
Region Sjælland ("Region Zealand")	Region Zealand	Sorø (Roskilde)	Trine Birk Andersen	843,513	7,217.8	116.86	Roskilde, Storstrøm, and West Zealand
Region Syddanmark ("Region of Southern Denmark")	Region of Southern Denmark	Vejle (Odense)	Bo Libergren	1,228,362	12,191	100.75	Funen, Ribe, South Jutland and the southern half of Vejle County
Danmark^{b} ("Denmark")	N/A	Copenhagen	N/A	5,873,420	42,894.8	136.92	(Counties of Denmark)

^{a} The regions themselves use English names that are not necessarily a verbatim rendering of the Danish name.
^{b} Area and population figures do not add up. Land area: 42,394 km^{2} (16,368 sq mi). Inland water area: 500 to 700 km^{2} (193 – 270 sq mi). Ertholmene included in totals. Statistikbanken.dk/FOLK1A+FOLK1AM (monthly population numbers).

=== Names in English ===
Like their geographical areas, the names of several regions are neologisms. The term Syddanmark (Southern Denmark) was known before the reform, but not in the present meaning. It was sometimes used to refer to Denmark proper as opposed to the North Atlantic parts of the Danish Realm, the Faroe Islands and Greenland. The term Midtjylland was, and in common use still is, used to describe the interior centre of Jutland, but never the coastal areas of the peninsula (West Jutland and East Jutland).

The Regions of North Jutland and Central Jutland have chosen to market themselves internationally under the names of North Denmark Region and Central Denmark Region, respectively, although in Denmark these geographical terms have no traditional use and may be confusing.

The government most often uses the Danish names in English-language publications or directly translated English names (e.g. Greater Copenhagen, Zealand, North Jutland, Southern Denmark, Central Jutland).

Strictly speaking, there is no authority defining the correct English names since the official names are stipulated in a law existing only in a Danish version.

=== Population growth ===
Total population and population growth of regions
Year	Region Hovedstaden		Region Sjælland		Region Syddanmark		Region Midtjylland		Region Nordjylland	
Year	Population	Growth	Population	Growth	Population	Growth	Population	Growth	Population	Growth
2006	1,633,565	3,184	811,511	4,607	1,185,851	3,966	1,219,725	7,703	576,807	165
2007	1,636,749	9,076	816,118	3,309	1,189,817	4,842	1,227,428	9,613	576,972	1,867
2008	1,645,825	16,460	819,427	1,825	1,194,659	5,008	1,237,041	10,691	578,839	1,676
2009	1,662,285	17,986	821,252	−688	1,199,667	610	1,247,732	6,266	580,515	−887
2010	1,680,271	19,116	820,564	−801	1,200,277	379	1,253,998	6,995	579,628	201
2011	1,699,387	15,202	819,763	−1,856	1,200,656	686	1,260,993	5,689	579,829	167
2012	1,714,589	17,479	817,907	−1,548	1,201,342	77	1,266,682	5,828	579,996	276
2013	1,732,068	17,337	816,359	367	1,201,419	1,090	1,272,510	5,028	580,272	785
2014	1,749,405	18,720	816,726	3,754	1,202,509	3,219	1,277,538	5,212	581,057	1,575
2015	1,768,125	21,049	820,480	7,019	1,205,728	6,042	1,282,750	10,559	582,632	2,867
2016	1,789,174	18,230	827,499	5,054	1,211,770	5,454	1,293,309	10,944	585,499	1,836
2017	1,807,404	15,255	832,553	2,471	1,217,224	3,539	1,304,253	9,343	587,335	1,813
2018	1,822,659	12,903	835,024	1,714	1,220,763	2,585	1,313,596	7,082	589,148	607
2019	1,835,562	10,461	836,738	621	1,223,348	–243	1,320,678	5,662	589,755	181
2020	1,846,023	9,061	837,359	1,481	1,223,105	529	1,326,340	5,708	589,936	503
2021	1,855,084	12,864	838,840	4,673	1,223,634	4,728	1,332,048	9,809	590,439	1,301
2022	1,867,948	23,923	843,513	6,344	1,228,362	9,051	1,341,857	17,022	591,740	2,894
2023	1,891,871	19,196	849,857	3,096	1,237,413	993	1,358,879	6,809	594,634	-1,499
2024	1,911,067	19,726	852,953	1,949	1,238,406	2,066	1,365,688	8,111	593,135	-367
2025	1,930,793		854,902		1,240,472		1,373,799		592,768	

Note: Numbers for the year 2006 are pro forma to be a reference, an example, to compare (neighboring) regions and changes in population numbers when the economy was expanding, growing, as opposed to when it was contracting.

== Functions ==
- Health sector, including hospitals, psychiatry and health insurance, general practitioners and specialists.
- Health insurance for basic dental care.
- Regional development concerning nature and the environment, private sector economy, tourism, employment, education, and culture, outlying areas and rural area development. Administrative assistance for private sector growth fora.
- Ground pollution surveillance and cleanup.
- Raw material mapping and planning. Permission for extraction, i.e. gravel pits.
- Social and educational institutions for people with special needs.
- Public transportation.

The most important area of responsibility for the new regions is the public health service, accounting for 90% of the regions' expenditure. They are also responsible for employment policies and public mass transit (buses and a few local railways). However, in eastern Denmark (Region Zealand and the Capital Region) the regions and 45 out of 46 municipalities share one employment region and transit is handled by a single transport agency, Movia.

Bornholm Regional Municipality because of its remote location in the Baltic Sea between Sweden and the westernmost part of Poland is its own employment region and is the sole owner of its own public mass transit agency, BAT, which was Bornholms Amts Trafikselskab until the island's county was abolished on 1 January 2003. Bornholm also performs other tasks that are normally carried out by the regions in the rest of Denmark – thus the name Bornholm Regional Municipality: Bornholm in some respects forms a region by itself. From 1 January 2016 Ærø Municipality, created 1 January 2006 as part of the municipal reform, is responsible for public mass transit in the municipality. From 1 January 2018 Fanø Municipality will be the sole provider of public mass transit on the island of Fanø taking over the responsibilities from the Region of Southern Denmark.

=== Healthcare reforms and centralization ===
The regions own all public hospitals in their areas and also control the primary care sector through contracts with general physicians (family doctors) and specialists. The name of the region is often used on hospitals' letterheads and on doctors' and nurses' white coats.

Four of the regions have a university hospital, corresponding with the four medical faculties of Denmark. The Region Zealand lacks a medical faculty but has in 2016 renamed its hospitals in Roskilde and Køge, close to Copenhagen, as university hospitals and will collaborate with the medical faculty of the University of Copenhagen. The administrative reform of 1 January 2007 was in many respects also a centralisation of the healthcare system. While the former counties controlled hospitals relatively independently, healthcare policy is now decided by the government, while regions administer it. Some local hospitals have been closed or downgraded. New, large and highly specialised hospitals have been built including Aarhus University Hospital and Psychiatric Hospital Slagelse. Projects during or awaiting construction are the new Aalborg University Hospital, Odense University Hospital, North Zealand Hospital at Hillerød serving the northern Copenhagen area, the regional Gødstrup Hospital and Aabenraa Hospital, and large extensions of the Zealand University Hospital in Køge, Herlev Hospital, Bispebjerg Hospital and Rigshospitalet in Copenhagen and the regional South Jutland Hospital in Sønderborg.

The projects, in Denmark known as 'super hospitals' (da: Supersygehus), were intended to increase the quality of care and reduce costs, but have almost uniformly experienced large-scale planning problems including breach of budgets, delays, interior climate problems, unsatisfactory design and last-minute cost cuts such as removing kitchens, decreasing the bed capacity or removing amenities for patients. As a result of the centralisation, Denmark will decrease its hospitals with emergency care from 40 in 2007 to 21 in 2020. The changes have been criticised by residents in areas far from emergency hospitals. To compensate, some of the regions offer paramedic helicopter response in addition to ambulances. In addition, since 1999 the government has obliged Danish hospitals to increase their productivity by 2% per year for the same budget, in the expectation of possible benefits from technical progress, but often leading to cutbacks in services. A growth in bureaucracy has generally been observed by doctors and employees. In the Capital Region and Zealand Region, a new electronic health record system developed by Epic Systems has been described as a major scandal, causing unresponsive IT systems, wrong prescriptions, more time-consumption and a lack of overview. Doctors and other employees have demanded the withdrawal of the system, but the regions insist that it will remain in place and errors be corrected.

Regions are responsible for providing primary care to all citizens. This is carried out through contracts with general practitioners who for the most part own their clinics and provide treatment free-of-charge for the public, according to specifications laid down by the region. According to doctors, the burden of documentation and administration has increased, and the amount of young doctors wishing a career as general practitioners has diminished. Since many areas have been affected by physician shortage, the regions have been compelled to open region-owned clinics to fill the gaps.

== Administration and politics ==
Regions are led by directly elected councils (regionsråd), which each consist of 41 members. The head of the council is the regional council chairman (regionsrådsformand), who is elected by the council from its members. Elections are held simultaneously with municipal elections every four years. The latest Danish local elections were held in 2025.

Unlike the former counties, regions are not entitled to levy their own taxes, but rely on central state funding (around 70%) and funding from the municipalities (around 30%). A central government "health contribution" tax (sundhedsbidrag) on income which was 8% when it was introduced from 2007 initially replaced most of the county tax (amtsskat). With income taxes in the lowest bracket being raised 1 percentage point a year, the health contribution tax was eliminated in 2019. In 2012 this tax was lowered to 7%, 2013 6%, 2014 5%, 2015 4%, 2016 3%, 2017 2%, 2018 1%. This follows an agreement on taxes by the Folketing from 2009.

The income tax that each of the 98 municipalities levy was raised by three percentage points 1 January 2007 thus replacing the rest of the county tax to finance health care.

90% of the budgets of the regions is allocated to the national health service. Health has remained the main issue in regional politics, especially because major changes to Denmark's hospital layout were announced immediately after the municipal reform.

== History ==
=== Earlier mergers ===
After the 1970 reform, in 1974 Sengeløse Municipality was merged with Høje-Taastrup, and the parish municipalities Store Magleby and Dragør merged to form Dragør Municipality, reducing the number of municipalities from 277 to 275. Countrywide, many local mergers were proposed through the years, but none took place until 2003.

The five municipalities of Bornholm merged with Bornholm County on 1 Jan 2003 to form Bornholm Regional Municipality. This reduced the number of counties from 14 to 13, and the number of municipalities from 275 to 271. On 1 January 2007 it became part of the Capital Region, but retained its unique name of Regional Municipality since it has been allocated some regional powers due to its isolated location. These include being an employment region of its own, regional development, pollution control and public transport, but healthcare is in the hands of the Capital Region.

Ærø Municipality in Funen County was allowed to be formed already 1 January 2006 from the island's former two municipalities of Ærøskøbing and Marstal, reducing the number of municipalities to 270.

=== Transitional process ===
The reform implied deep changes of the whole Danish public sector. It took effect from 1 January 2007, but was prepared from 2005. In the local elections of 15 November 2005, municipal councils for the upcoming 98 municipalities and five regions were elected. These councils were officially merger committees (sammenlægningsudvalg) from 1 January 2006 through 31 December 2006. During that year, their task was solely that of preparing the mergers. On 1 January 2007 these elected committees were renamed municipal councils and now ruling the new municipalities, without new elections taking place.

The councils of the older, smaller municipalities, as well as the old municipalities themselves, were in force until the end of 2006. They were elected in November 2001 and would normally have been in power for a four-year term of office, from 1 January 2002 until 31 December 2005, but their term of office was extended by one year.

The equivalent name for the upcoming regional councils were preparatory boards (forberedelsesudvalg) and these were likewise elected on 15 November 2005. The county councils of the old counties had their mandate prolonged by a year and existed parallel to the preparatory boards during 2006.

One municipality, Bornholm, which was formed January 2003 before the reform was initiated, and one formed January 2006, namely Ærø, as part of the reform, in addition to 30 municipalities, most notably Copenhagen, many of its surrounding municipalities and some island municipalities, were not affected by municipal mergers 1 January 2007. In these municipalities, the councillors served the full term of office from 1 January 2006 until 31 December 2009.

After the transitions, the next local elections took place on 17 Nov 2009. A few local political parties have emerged as a protest against closing of hospitals or cutbacks in healthcare, most notably Fælleslisten, which got over 40 percent of the votes in the Holstebro area in the 2009 election, and the Psychiatry List in the 2017 election, both in the Central Jutland Region.

=== Political background ===
The reform has been called the biggest reform in thirty years. It was an important policy issue for the former Liberal-Conservative cabinet, most importantly for Lars Løkke Rasmussen, then minister of the Interior and Health and formerly a county mayor.

The abolition of the counties had long been an important goal for both the Conservatives and the Danish People's Party. 24 June 2004 the Danish People's Party decided to back the government's proposal for a structural reform of the public sector, thus securing a majority in the Danish parliament (Folketing), although the party had preferred just abolishing the counties without replacing them with a new administrative level between the central government and the municipalities. The parties who wanted to limit the regional tier of government prevailed insofar as the regions have no authority to levy taxes, and are not municipalities unlike the former counties (1970–2006) (Danish amtskommune, literally 'county municipality'), and therefore cannot move budgets from one area of expenditure to another but must pay back any money not used, rather like departments or agencies of the central government.

== State Administration (2007–March 2019) ==
=== Establishment ===
The regions were distinct from the state administration offices (Danish: statsforvaltning(en)). The regions are responsible for devolved tasks within healthcare and regional planning and governed by an elected council. The State Administrations were not subordinate to the Regions, but regional governmental offices under the Ministry for Children and Social Affairs.

The state administration with its regional offices handled matters within family law, including child custody and child contact, divorce, paternity and child support cases, which often involve a high degree of conflict when parents disagree. It also handled matters such as name change, artificial fertilisation, citizenship, right of residence for EU citizens, guardianship for adults, and acted as a complaints authority for municipal decisions in building matters.

Initially after the reform, effective from 1 January 2007, there were five state administrations, covering the same areas as the five regions. They were subject to the Ministry of the Interior and Health. They also acted as a complaints board for a wider range of decisions taken by municipalities, including social law. The civil servants leading each of the five state administrations had the title of state administration director.

From 1 July 2013, the State Administration was organised with one central office in Aabenraa and eight regional representations. It was managed by one central State Administration director and several subordinate vice directors.

=== Abolition ===
While not a court, the State Administration handled over 100,000 family law cases per year. In media reports, the entity was criticized for bureaucratic handling of cases and negligence of the best interest of children. Organizations of single fathers claimed that case officers were biased and would often side with the mother, for example when unproven accusations of incest or abuse were made.

A 2017 government plan proposed to abolish the State Administration and replace it with a new entity, the Family Law House (Familieretshuset).

The State Administration was abolished from 1 April 2019, and the Agency of Family Law took over a large part of the tasks of the State Administration.

=== Ecclesiastical tasks ===
One of the tasks of the State Administration is the technical and economic supervision of the dioceses within the Church of Denmark, along with the bishops. In this function they bear the title of stiftamtmand (literally 'diocesan governor'). While each of the five regional state administration directors were simultaneously diocesan governors, the task is now carried out by several vice directors who carry the additional title of diocesan governors. Peculiarly, since the task is purely administrative and representing the government under the Ministry for Ecclesiastical Affairs, the person does not need to be a member of the Church of Denmark. In 2011, Niels Preisler, a Roman Catholic, was appointed director of the Copenhagen state administration and therefore diocesan governor of Copenhagen.

=== History ===
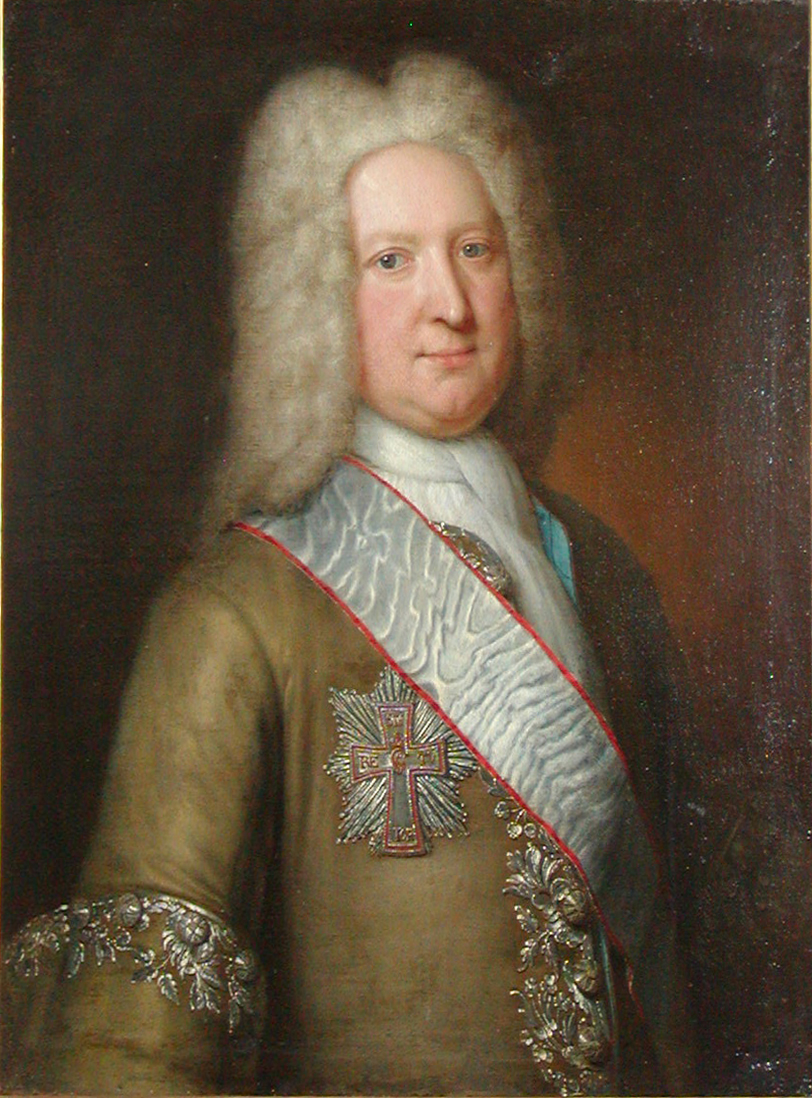
Henrik Frederik von Söhlenthal, a Danish county prefect in the 18th century

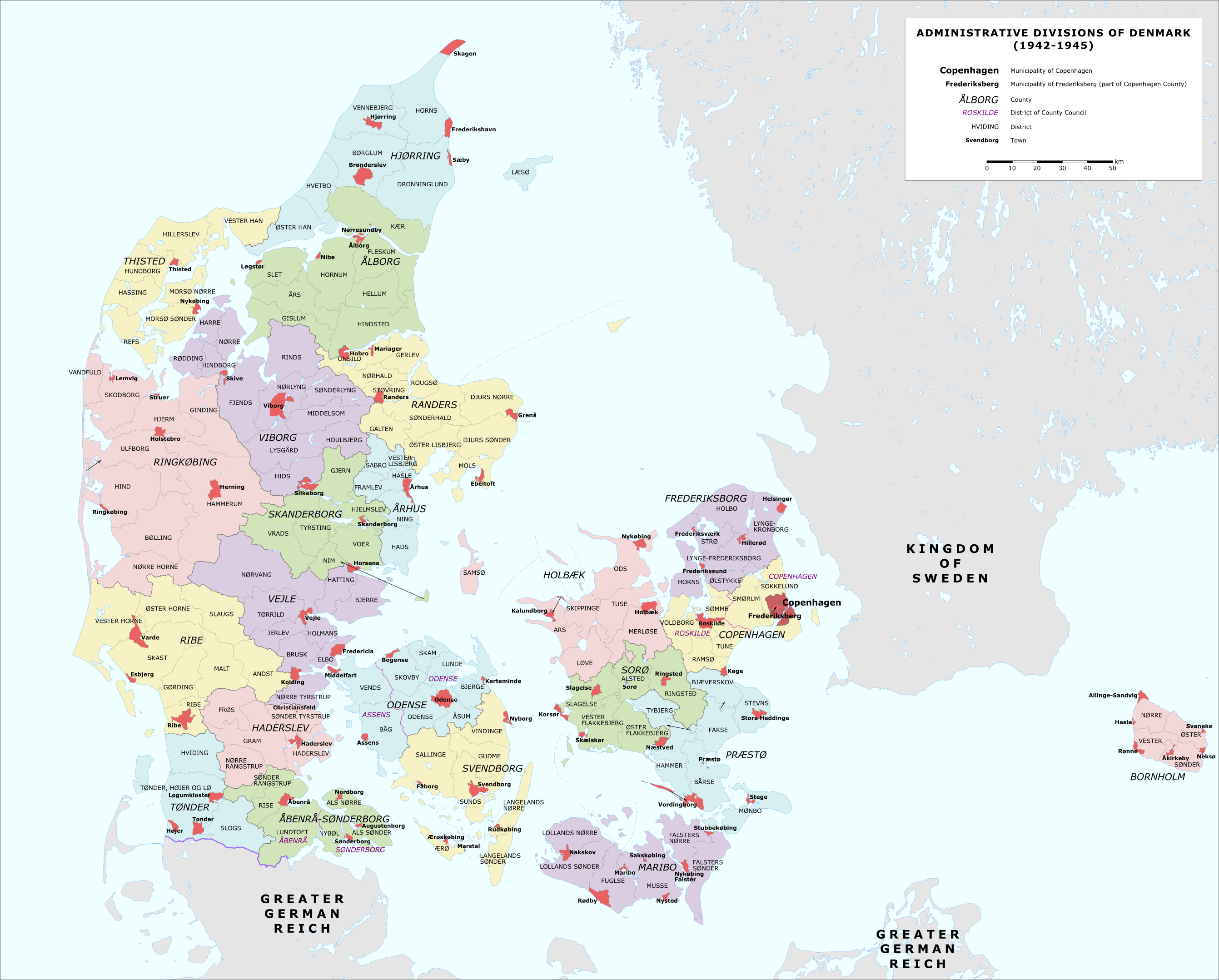
Map of the 22 counties of Denmark existing until 1970 (without Greenland and the Faroe Islands)

The predecessor of the state administration(s), from 1970 until the 2007 reform, were the 14 county government divisions or prefectures (Danish: statsamt, plural: statsamter, i.e. 'state county'). They were each led by an amtmand (county prefect or governor) appointed by the government, while in ecclesiastical contexts the title stiftamtmand ('diocesan prefect') was used for the same position. These units were distinct from the 14 counties led by an elected council, but covered the same areas. Copenhagen, however, had the equivalent entity of Upper Presidium (Københavns overpræsidium) led by an upper president (overpræsident), a title originating from 1747. The municipality of Frederiksberg shared its county governor and county government division with Copenhagen County (not covering Copenhagen proper, but the surrounding area). Bornholm retained its county government office and governor even after losing its county status (2003–2006).

While prefect or governor is an English rendering of the title, county prefects were practically senior government officials, unknown to a larger public and less powerful than governors in many other countries. On the Faroe Islands and Greenland, after autonomy, the equivalent representative of the Danish government is the High Commissioner, (rigsombudsmand, formerly amtmand, which was often translated as governor).

The general public was mostly familiar with the former statsamt and then statsadministration as the entity dealing with divorce and child custody.

The position of county prefect dated back to the age of absolutism. After elected councils were introduced, the King-appointed county prefect still led the elected county council and had larger political influence. In 1970, his political role was then taken over by the county mayor (amtsborgmester) who was one of the elected county council members. The county prefect remained as the highest government representative in each county, and in his traditional civil servant uniform would be the person to receive the Queen on her visits throughout the country. In Copenhagen Municipality, the switch was made in 1938 when the title of Lord Mayor of Copenhagen (Københavns overborgmester) was created for the elected leader of the city council. The equivalent of the Danish county prefect is the Swedish landshövding and the Norwegian fylkesmann.

== See also ==
- List of Danish regions by Human Development Index
- Municipalities of Denmark
- Subdivisions of the Nordic countries
- Faroe Islands
- Greenland
- NUTS statistical regions of Denmark
- ISO 3166-2:DK
