= Vejle Municipality =

Vejle Municipality Vejle Kommune (Danish)
- Municipality
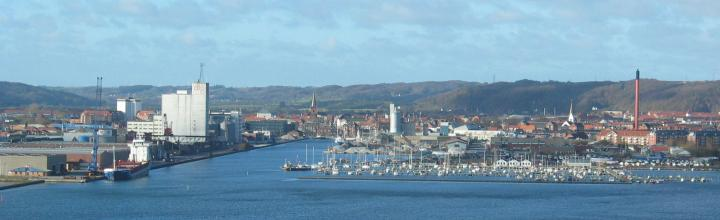
- Vejle as seen from the Vejle Fjord Bridge

- Coat of arms

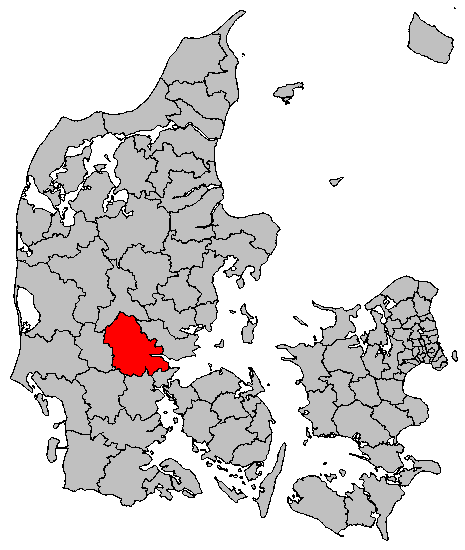
- Coordinates: 55°42′18″N 9°31′58″E
- Country: Denmark
- Region: Southern Denmark
- Established: 1 January 2007
- Seat: City of Vejle

Government
  - Mayor: Jens Ejner Christensen (Venstre)

Area
  - Total: 1,066.32 km^{2} (411.71 sq mi)

Population (1 January 2026)
  - Total: 123,250
  - Density: 115.58/km^{2} (299.36/sq mi)
- Time zone: UTC+1 (CET)
  - Summer (DST): UTC+2 (CEST)
- Postal code: 7100
- Website: www.vejle.dk

Vejle Municipality (Danish: Vejle Kommune) is a kommune in the Region of Southern Denmark on the Jutland peninsula in southeast Denmark. The municipality covers an area of 1,058.43 km^{2} (408.66 sq mi) (2013), and has a population of 123,250 (1 January 2026). Its mayor is Jens Ejner Christensen, a member of the agrarian liberal party Venstre. Vejle Municipality's offices are located in its largest population center, the city of Vejle.

In its current configuration, Vejle Municipality was formed under the Municipal Reform of 2007 (Kommunalreformen) by merging the previously existing Vejle Municipality with the neighboring municipalities of Børkop, Egtved, Give (except for properties in two parishes Lindeballe and Ringive occupied by Billund Airport, which became part of Billund Municipality), Jelling, as well as the parish of Grejs, which formerly belonged to the municipality of Tørring-Uldum.

The municipality is part of Triangle Region and of the East Jutland metropolitan area, which had a total population of 1.378 million in 2016.

The central administration of the Region of Southern Denmark is in Vejle, located in the former Vejle County offices at Damhaven 12.

== Locations ==
Largest cities and villages in Vejle Municipality
Name	Population (2024)
Vejle	61,706
Børkop	6,334
Give	4,682
Jelling	3,853
Brejning	3,090
Skibet	2,615
Egtved	2,457
Bredsten	1,898
Ødsted	1,536
Thyregod	1,349

== Politics ==
Vejle's municipal council consists of 31 members, elected every four years. The municipal council has ten political committees.

=== Municipal council ===
Below are the municipal councils elected since the Municipal Reform of 2007.

Election	Party									Total seats	Turnout	Elected mayor
Election	A	B	C	D	F	I	O	V	Ø	Total seats	Turnout	Elected mayor
2005	10	1	1		8		4	7		31	70.3%	Leif Skov (A)
2009	8	1	2		5		4	11		31	66.0%	Arne Sigtenbjerggaard (V)
2013	9	1	1		2	1	4	12	1	31	71.3%	Arne Sigtenbjerggaard (V)
2017	11	1	2		3	1	3	10		31	70.5%	Jens Ejner Christensen (V)
2021	9	1	3	2	3		1	12		31	67.1%	Jens Ejner Christensen (V)
Data from Kmdvalg.dk 2005, 2009, 2013, 2017 and 2021

== Notable attractions ==
- Haraldskær Woman
- The Jelling Monument (UNESCO World Heritage site)

== Sources ==
- Municipal statistics: NetBorger Kommunefakta, delivered from KMD aka Kommunedata (Municipal Data)
- Municipal mergers and neighbors: Eniro new municipalities map
