= Vejle Municipality (1970–2006) =

Former municipality in Denmark

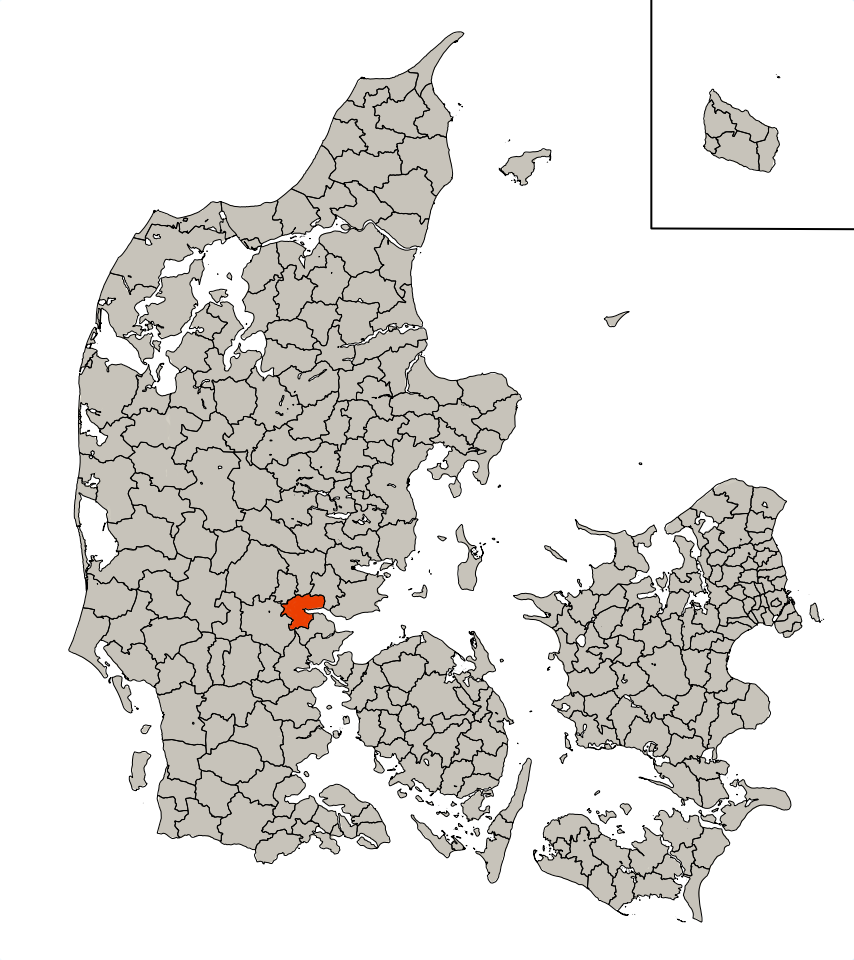
Vejle Municipality's location in Denmark, 1970–2006.

The old Vejle Municipality (Danish: Vejle Kommune) in Denmark existed from 1970 to 2006. In 2007 it was merged with other municipalities to form the new Vejle Municipality. The municipality covered an area of 144 km^{2}, and had a total population of 56,104 (2005).
