= Ulfborg-Vemb Municipality =

Municipality in Denmark

Coordinates: 56°18′43″N 8°20′14″E

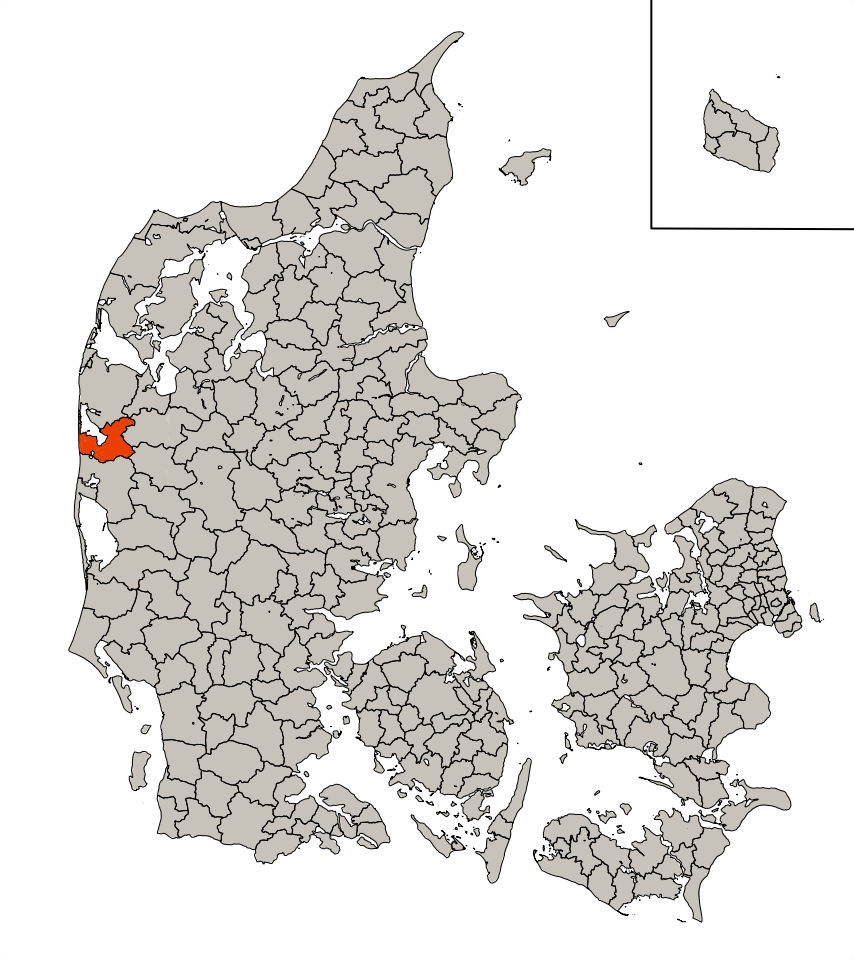
Ulfborg-Vemb Municipality's location in Denmark, 1970–2007.

Ulfborg-Vemb was a Danish municipality (Danish, kommune) in the former Ringkjøbing County on the west coast of the Jutland peninsula. The municipality existed from 1970 until 2007, and its administrative region is today part of Holstebro Municipality.

== History ==
Ulfborg-Vemb was created as a result of the 1970 Danish Municipal Reform that combined the existing parishes of: Bur, Gørding, Husby, Madum, Staby, Sønder Nissum, Ulfborg Sogn, and Vemb. The municipality was within Ringkjøbing County, and its municipal council was the town of Ulfborg. It bordered the municipalities of Trehøje and Holstebro to the east, Struer and Lemvig municipalities to the north, and Ringkøbing Municipality to the south. Its western border met with the North Sea, while part of its northern border was defined by Nissum Fjord.

In 2005, Ulfborg-Vemb covered an area of 226 km^{2} and had a total population of 6,959. The municipality ceased to exist as a result of the Municipal reform of 2007. It was merged with existing Holstebro and Vinderup municipalities to form the new Holstebro municipality. This created a municipality with an area of 790 km^{2} and a total population of 56,204 (2007).

== List of mayors ==
- Termann Nordsmark, 1970–1984 (lokalliste)
- Kaj Brink Nielsen, 1984–1999 (Venstre)
- Niels Kristian Jensen, 1999–2007 (Venstre)
