= Egtved Municipality =

Former municipality in Vejle, Denmark

Coordinates: 55.6200°N 9.3006°E

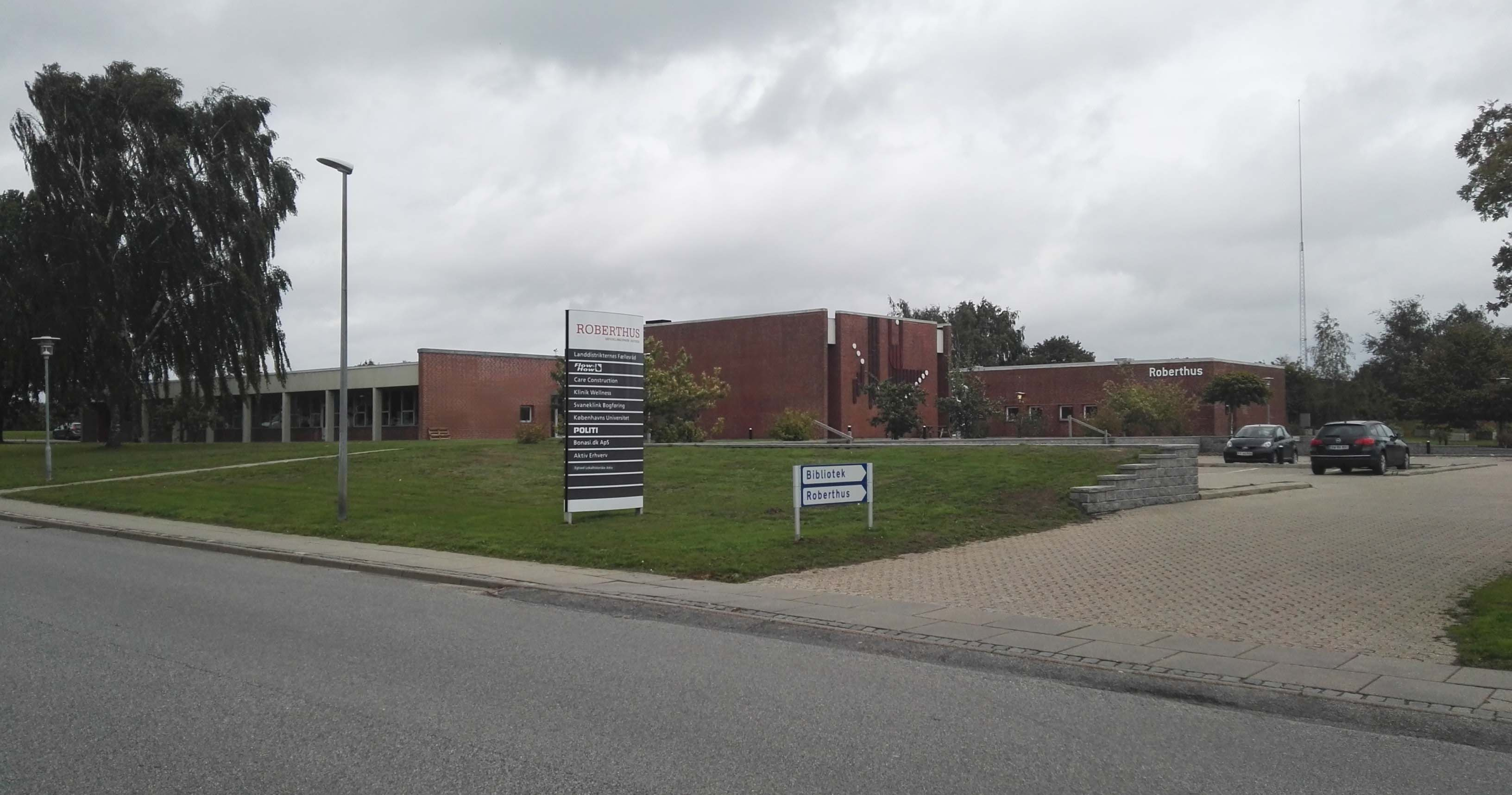
The Roberthus community and cultural center at Tybovej 2, originally the town hall of the former Egtved Municipality

Until 1 January 2007, Egtved municipality was a municipality (Danish, kommune) in Vejle County on the Jutland peninsula in southeast Denmark. The municipality covered an area of 325 km^{2}, and had a total population of 15,302 (2005). Its last mayor was Sonny Berthold, a member of the Venstre (Liberal Party) political party. The main town and the site of its municipal council was the town of Egtved.

The municipality was created in 1970 due to a kommunalreform ("Municipality Reform") that combined the following parishes: Bredsten, Egtved, Jerlev, Nørup, Randbøl, Vester Nebel, Ødsted, and Øster Starup parishes.

Egtved municipality ceased to exist as the result of Kommunalreformen ("The Municipality Reform" of 2007). It was merged with Børkop, Give, Jelling, and Vejle municipalities to form a new Vejle municipality. This created a municipality with an area of 1,055 km^{2} and a total population of 82,935 (2005). The new municipality belongs to Region of Southern Denmark. The report on the structural reform of the public sector was published 9 January 2004, and presented to more than 1,000 politicians, researchers, and journalists 14 January 2004 in Vingstedcentret in Egtved Municipality.
