= Give Municipality =

Municipality in Denmark, 1970–2006

Coordinates: 55°50′38″N 9°14′18″E

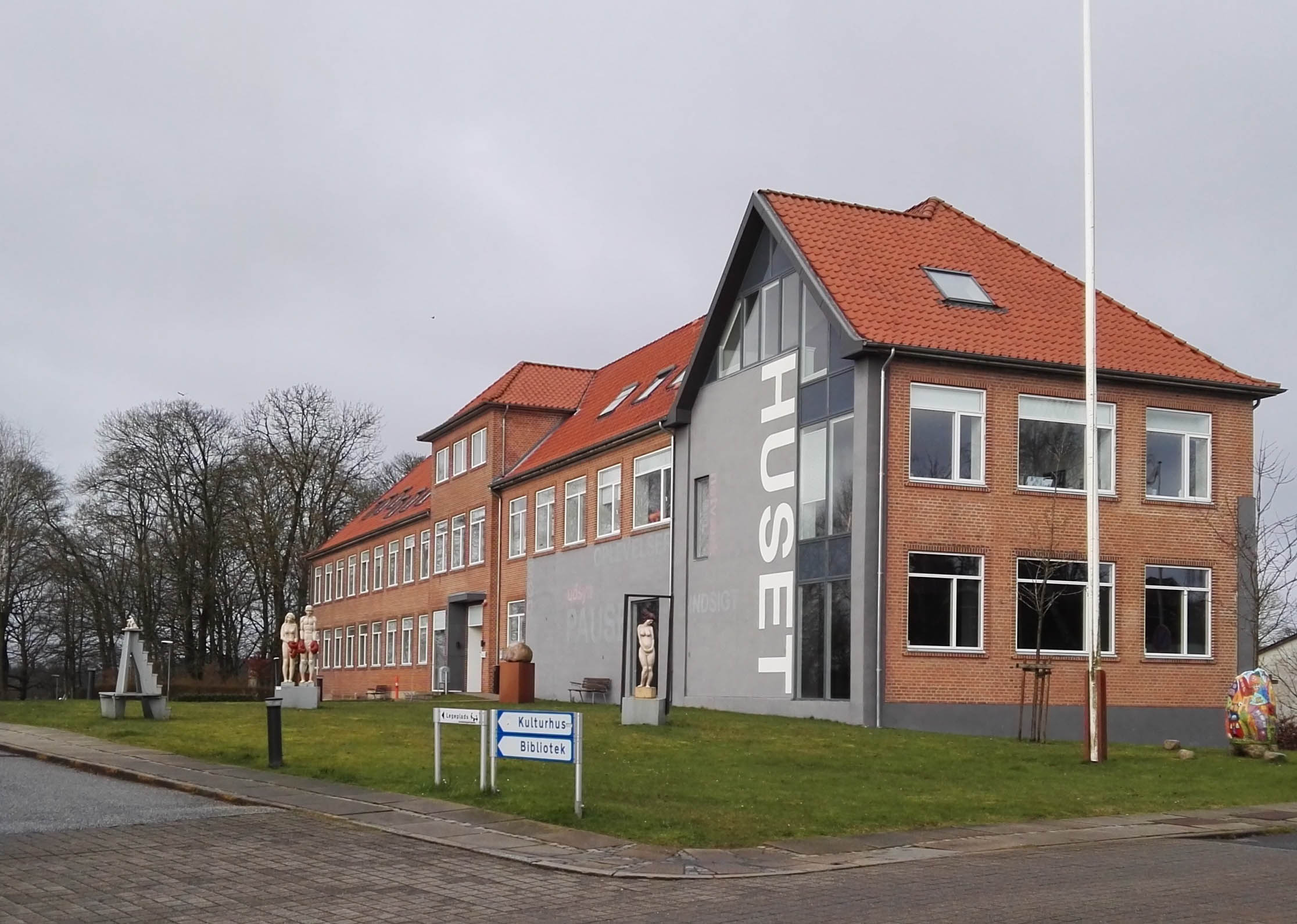
Give Library and cultural center in the main wing of the former Give Municipality town hall, which was originally built as a school. The southeast wing has been demolished,

Until 1 January 2007 Give municipality was a municipality (Danish, kommune) in Vejle County on the Jutland peninsula in southeast Denmark. The municipality covered an area of 403 km^{2}, and had a total population of 14,090 (2005). Its last mayor was Villy Dahl Johansen. The main town and the site of its municipal council was the town of Give.

The municipality was created in 1970 due to a kommunalreform ("Municipality Reform") that combined the following parishes: Gadbjerg, Give, Givskud, Lindeballe, Ringive, Thyregod, Vester, Øster Nykirke, Give Birk, and Enkelund Birk parishes.

Give municipality ceased to exist as the result of Kommunalreformen ("The Municipality Reform" of 2007). It was merged with Børkop, Egtved, Jelling, and Vejle municipalities to form a new Vejle Municipality, and a part went to Billund Municipality, namely a part of Billund Airport located on properties in the parishes Lindeballe and Ringive. Vejle Municipality belongs to Region of Southern Denmark.
