= Region Zealand =

Region of Denmark

Zealand Region Region Sjælland (Danish)
- Region of Denmark
- Flag Logo

- Coordinates: 55°10′N 11°50′E
- Country: Denmark
- Capital: Sorø
- Largest city: Roskilde
- Municipalities: 17: Faxe; Greve; Guldborgsund; Holbæk; Kalundborg; Køge; Lejre; Lolland; Næstved; Odsherred; Ringsted; Roskilde; Slagelse; Solrød; Sorø; Stevns; Vordingborg

Government
  - Chairman: Trine Birk Andersen (A)

Area
  - Total: 7,223 km^{2} (2,789 sq mi)

Population (1 January 2025)
  - Total: 854,902
  - Density: 118.4/km^{2} (306.5/sq mi)

GDP
  - Total: €39.701 billion (2024)
  - Per capita: €46,488 (2024)
- ISO 3166 code: DK-85
- NUTS code: DK02
- HDI (2022): 0.918 very high · 5th

Region Zealand (Danish: Region Sjælland) is an administrative region of Denmark. It is one of the five classified NUTS-2 statistical regions of Denmark. It was established on 1 January 2007 as part of the 2007 Danish Municipal Reform, which abolished the traditional counties ("amter"). The region incorporates the southernmost parts of the country, and encompasses an area of 7,223 km^{2} (2,789 sq mi).

Zealand will merge with the Capital Region of Denmark on 1 January 2027 to create the Region of Eastern Denmark.

The region shares the island of Sjælland (Zealand in English) with the neighbouring Capital Region of Copenhagen. The region also includes the islands of Lolland, Falster, and Møn. It incorporates the provinces of Østsjælland and Vest-og Sydsjælland, which consists of 17 municipalities. With a population of just over 0.85 million, it is the second least populated of the all the regions in Denmark. The largest city is Roskilde.

== History ==
The Zealand region was established as a part of the 2007 Danish Municipal Reform. The Danish government has announced its intention to merge the region with Hovedstaden on 1 January 2027.

== Classification ==
The country of Denmark is organized into five regions for administrative purposes. The same five broader level sub-divisions are applicable for the Nomenclature of Territorial Units for Statistics (NUTS). These are classified as a NUTS-2 statistical region, and incorporate one or more municipalities within it.

== Geography ==
Municipalities of Region Zealand

The Zealand region incorporates the southern most parts of the country, encompassing an area of 7,223 km^{2} (2,789 sq mi). The region is located in Northern Europe, in the Baltic Sea. Zealand region was formed from the former counties of Roskilde, Storstrøm, and Vestsjælland, and incorporates the provinces of Østsjælland and Vest-og Sydsjælland. The region is named after the island of Sjælland (Zealand), which it shares with the neighbouring Danish Capital Region of Copenhagen. The region also includes the islands of Lolland, Falster, and Møn. The Oresund strait separates the region from Sweden. The largest city is Roskilde.

=== Sub-divisions ===
The region is subdivided into 17 municipalities–Faxe, Greve, Guldborgsund, Holbæk, Kalundborg, Køge, Lejre, Lolland, Næstved, Odsherred, Ringsted, Roskilde, Slagelse, Solrød, Sorø, Stevns, Vordingborg. The five regions of Denmark each have a regional council of 41 members. These are elected every four years, during the local elections.

Election	Party									
Election	SD	DSL	CPP	NR	SPP	LA	DPP	V	RGA	OTH
2005	14	2	3		3		4	13	1	1
2009	12	1	3		8		5	12		
2013	11	1	2		2	1	7	13	4	
2017	14	2	3		2	1	6	10	3	
2021	15	2	5	2	3		2	10	2	
Not included in 2025 local elections Present number of cllrs	16	2	6	1	3	1	1	9	2	
Source:Kmdvalg.dk

== Demographics ==
With a population of just over 0.85 million, it is the second least populated of the all the regions in Denmark. The population includes 426,092 males and 428,810 females. About 158,739 of the inhabitants are under the age of seventeen. About 82% of the population lived in urban areas. Danish people made up nearly 92% of the population. The Gross domestic product (GDP) of the region was almost €37.7 billion in 2023, accounting for around 10% of Denmark's economic output.

== See also ==
- Regions of Denmark
