= Vejle County =

Coordinates: 55°42′36″N 9°32′00″E

Vejle County Vejle Amt (Danish)
- County of Denmark
- Coat of arms

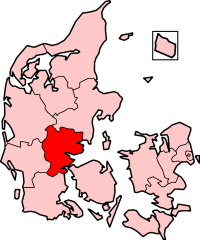
- Vejle County in Denmark
- Seat: Vejle

Area
  - Total: 2,996.64 km^{2} (1,157.01 sq mi)

Population (2006)
  - Total: 360,921
  - Density: 120.442/km^{2} (311.943/sq mi)

Vejle County (Danish: Vejle Amt) is a former county (Danish: amt) on the east coast of the Jutland peninsula in southern Denmark. The county was abolished effective January 1, 2007, when it was divided between Region Midtjylland (i.e. Region Central Jutland) and Region of Southern Denmark. Vejle became the seat of the latter region.

== List of County Mayors ==
| From | To | County Mayor |
|---|---|---|
| 1970 | 1974 | Aksel Buhl (Venstre) |
| 1974 | 1993 | Erling Tiedemann (Venstre) |
| 1994 | 2006 | Otto Herskind Jørgensen (Venstre) |

== Municipalities (1970-2006) ==
- Brædstrup municipality
- Børkop municipality
- Egtved municipality
- Fredericia municipality
- Gedved municipality
- Give municipality
- Hedensted municipality
- Horsens municipality
- Jelling municipality
- Juelsminde municipality
- Kolding municipality
- Lunderskov municipality
- Nørre-Snede municipality
- Tørring-Uldum municipality
- Vamdrup municipality
- Vejle municipality

== Notable sites ==
The Jelling stones are archaeological treasures erected by Harald Bluetooth to honour his parents. Encyclopædia Britannica considers the runic inscriptions the best known in Denmark.

The Haraldskær Woman is a bog body interred in about 500 BC, discovered in a peat bog with a remarkable state of preservation.
