= Ringkjøbing County =

Coordinates: 56°05′N 8°15′E

Ringkjøbing County Ringkjøbing Amt (Danish)
- County of Denmark
- Coat of arms

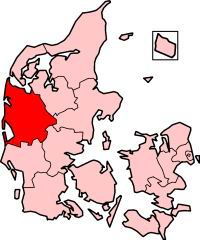
- Ringkjøbing County in Denmark
- Seat: Ringkøbing

Area
  - Total: 4,853 km^{2} (1,874 sq mi)

Population (2006)
  - Total: 275,065
  - Density: 56.68/km^{2} (146.8/sq mi)

Ringkjøbing County (Danish: Ringkjøbing Amt) is a former county (Danish: amt) on the Jutland peninsula in western Denmark. It had the lowest population density of all the Danish counties. The county was abolished effective January 1, 2007, when it merged into Region Midtjylland (i.e. Region Central Jutland).

Note of terminology: A modern Danish spelling of the name would be Ringkøbing Amt, but the county officially used an older, traditional spelling, as opposed to the municipality of Ringkøbing.

== List of County Mayors ==
| From | To | County Mayor |
|---|---|---|
| April 1, 1970 | - | Aage Ebbensgaard |
| - | - | Lars Agerskov |
| - | - | Anton Kristensen |
| - | - | S. E. Kristensen |
| March 1996 | December 31, 2006 | Knud Munk Nielsen (Venstre) |

== Municipalities (1970-2006) ==
- Aulum-Haderup Municipality
- Brande Municipality
- Egvad Municipality
- Herning Municipality
- Holmsland Municipality
- Holstebro Municipality
- Ikast Municipality
- Lemvig Municipality
- Ringkøbing Municipality
- Skjern Municipality
- Struer Municipality
- Thyborøn-Harboør Municipality
- Thyholm Municipality
- Trehøje Municipality
- Ulfborg-Vemb Municipality
- Videbæk Municipality
- Vinderup Municipality
- Aaskov Municipality
