= Region of Southern Denmark =

Region of Denmark

Region of Southern Denmark Region Syddanmark (Danish) Region Süddänemark (German) Regiuun Syddanmark (North Frisian)
- Region
- Logo

- Coordinates: 55°20′N 9°40′E
- Country: Denmark
- Capital: Vejle
- Largest city: Odense
- Municipalities: 22: Aabenraa; Assens; Billund; Esbjerg; Faaborg-Midtfyn; Fanø; Fredericia; Haderslev; Kerteminde; Kolding; Langeland; Middelfart; Nordfyn; Nyborg; Odense; Svendborg; Sønderborg; Tønder; Varde; Vejen; Vejle; Ærø

Government
  - Chairman: Bo Libergren (V)

Area
  - Total: 12,191 km^{2} (4,707 sq mi)

Population (1 January 2025)
  - Total: 1,240,472
  - Density: 101.75/km^{2} (263.54/sq mi)

GDP
  - Total: €61.686 billion (2021)
  - Per capita: €50,500 (2021)
- Time zone: UTC+1 (CET)
  - Summer (DST): UTC+2 (CEST)
- ISO 3166 code: DK-83
- HDI (2022): 0.937 very high · 3rd of 5
- Website: www.regionsyddanmark.dk

The Region of Southern Denmark (Danish: Region Syddanmark, pronounced [ʁekiˈoˀn ˈsyðˌtænmɑk]; German: Region Süddänemark, pronounced [ʁeˈɡi̯oːn zyːtˈdɛːnəˌmaʁk]; North Frisian: Regiuun Syddanmark) is an administrative region of Denmark established on Monday 1 January 2007 as part of the 2007 Danish Municipal Reform, which abolished the traditional counties ("amter") and set up five larger regions. At the same time, smaller municipalities were merged into larger units, cutting the number of municipalities from 270 (271 before 2006) before 1 January 2007 to 98. The reform diminished the power of the regional level dramatically in favor of the local level and the central government in Copenhagen. The Region of Southern Denmark has 22 municipalities. The reform was implemented in Denmark on 1 January 2007, although the merger of the Funish municipalities of Ærøskøbing and Marstal, being a part of the reform, was given the go-ahead to be implemented on Sunday 1 January 2006, one year before the main reform. It borders Schleswig-Holstein (Germany) to the south and Central Denmark Region to the north and is connected to Region Zealand via the Great Belt Fixed Link.

The regional capital is Vejle; Odense is the region's largest city, which is home to the main campus of the University of Southern Denmark with branch campuses in Esbjerg, Kolding and Sønderborg. The responsibilities of the regional administration include hospitals and regional public transport, which is divided between two operators, Sydtrafik on the mainland and Als, and Fynbus on Funen and adjacent islands. On the island municipalities of Ærø (since 2016) and Fanø (since 2018), the municipalities themselves are responsible for public transport. Billund Airport is the region's main airport; it is the second-busiest airport in Denmark behind Copenhagen Airport and one of the busiest air cargo centres. It handles an average of more than three million passengers a year, and millions of pounds of cargo.

== Geography ==
The Region of Southern Denmark is the westernmost of the Danish administrative regions (Region Zealand being the southernmost).

It consists of the former counties of Funen, Ribe and South Jutland, adding ten municipalities from the former Vejle County. The territories formerly belonging to Vejle County consist of the new municipalities of Fredericia (unchanged by the reform), Vejle (a merger of Vejle, Børkop, parts of Egtved, Give, and Jelling) and Kolding (a merger of Kolding, parts of Lunderskov, Vamdrup, and parts of both Egtved and Christiansfeld - the latter from South Jutland County). A total of 78 municipalities were combined to a total of 22 new entities.

=== Municipalities ===
Map of the municipalities of the region

The region is subdivided into 22 municipalities:

- Aabenraa
- Assens
- Billund
- Esbjerg
- Faaborg-Midtfyn
- Fanø
- Fredericia
- Haderslev
- Kerteminde
- Kolding
- Langeland
- Middelfart
- Nordfyn
- Nyborg
- Odense
- Svendborg
- Sønderborg
- Tønder
- Varde
- Vejen
- Vejle
- Ærø

== GDP ==
The Gross domestic product (GDP) of the region was 57.3 billion € in 2018, accounting for 19.0% of Denmark's economic output. GDP per capita adjusted for purchasing power was 35,100 € or 116% of the EU27 average in the same year.

== North Schleswig Germans ==
The Region of Southern Denmark is home to the only officially recognised ethno-linguistic minority of Denmark proper, the North Schleswig Germans of North Schleswig. This minority makes up about 6% of the total population of the municipalities of Aabenraa/Apenrade, Haderslev/Hadersleben, Sønderborg/Sonderburg and Tønder/Tondern. In these four municipalities, the German minority enjoys certain linguistic rights in accordance with the European Charter for Regional or Minority Languages.

== Regional Council ==
The five regions of Denmark each have a regional council of 41 members. These are elected every four years, during the local elections.

Election	Party										Total seats	Elected chairman
Election	A	B	C	D	F	I	O	V	Ø	...	Total seats	Elected chairman
2005	14	1	6		2		3	13	1	1	41	Carl Holst (V) (1 January 2007 – 22 June 2015)
2009	12	1	4		6		4	13		1	41	Carl Holst (V) (1 January 2007 – 22 June 2015)
2013	12	1	3		2	1	5	15	2		41	Carl Holst (V) (1 January 2007 – 22 June 2015)
2017	10	1	2		6	1	5	14	2		41	Stephanie Lose (V)(22 June 2015 – 14 March 2023;31 July – 27 November 2023); Bo Libergren (V)(14 March – 31 July 2023; 27 November 2023 – )
2021	12	2	3	2	2		1	17	2		41	Stephanie Lose (V)(22 June 2015 – 14 March 2023;31 July – 27 November 2023); Bo Libergren (V)(14 March – 31 July 2023; 27 November 2023 – )
Current	11	2	3	2	3		1	17	2	...	41	
Data from Kmdvalg.dk

Carl Holst was a member of the central government of Denmark from 28 June 2015 – 30 September 2015. From 2023 Stephanie Lose became a part of the central government of Denmark.

== See also ==
- University of Southern Denmark
