= Counties of Denmark =

Former administrative subdivisions of metropolitan Denmark

The Counties of Denmark (Danish: Danmarks amter) were former subdivisions of metropolitan Denmark and overseas territories, used primarily for administrative regions, with each county having its own council with substantial powers. Originally there had been twenty-four counties, but the number was reduced to roughly fourteen in 1970 – the number fluctuated slightly over the next three decades. In 2006 there were thirteen traditional counties as well as three municipalities with county status (the island of Bornholm, which was a county from 1660 until 2002, became a regional municipality with county powers, but only briefly from 2003 until 2006). On 1 January 2007, as a result of the strukturreformen, the counties were abolished and replaced by five larger regions which, unlike the counties, are not municipalities.

Copenhagen County comprised all the municipalities of Metropolitan Copenhagen, except Copenhagen Municipality and Frederiksberg Municipality which, on account of their peculiarity of being outside any of the traditional counties, had the equivalent of "county status". On 1 January 2007 these two municipalities lost their special status.

Greenland and the Faroe Islands are also part of the Kingdom of Denmark, but both enjoy internal autonomy. Both are largely self-governing, and each community sends two members to the Folketinget (the Parliament of Denmark). The Faroe Islands obtained self-government as a rigsdel (an autonomous territory) within the Kingdom of Denmark in 1948; from 1816 to 1948, the islands had the status of a Danish amt (county). Greenland changed from being a colony to being an overseas county in June 1953, and subsequently also gained home rule as a rigsdel in July 1979.

== Abolition ==
A government proposal in 2004 called for the counties to be abolished and replaced by five large regions with health care as their main responsibilities: two regions in Jutland, two regions in Zealand and one region covering Funen and the southernmost part of Jutland. The proposal also required the municipalities to merge reducing them from 271 to 98, with a minimum of 20,000 inhabitants in each municipality, although some exceptions were made to this rule. In 2007, 25 municipalities had fewer than 30,000 inhabitants each, with the average number of inhabitants over 55,500 per municipality. Only the United Kingdom and Ireland had more populous entities at the lowest political administrative level.

The reform was confirmed by the Danish Parliament on 24 February 2005 and the counties were abolished on 1 January 2007.

== List of counties (1970–2006) ==
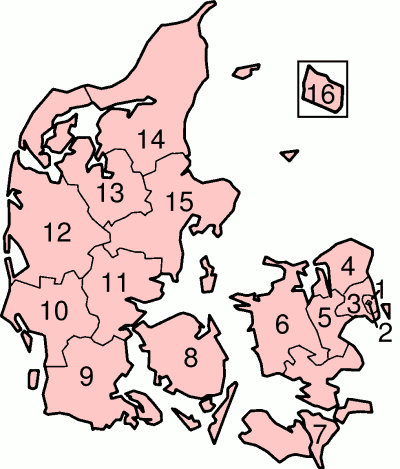
Map of Denmark showing the former counties

The counties and county-level municipalities are listed below.

Map no.	Name	Capital	Type of entity	Population (2006)	Total area (km^{2})	Pop. density (per km^{2})
not shown	Greenland County (from 1953 to 1979)	Nuuk	County	n/a	2,166,000 (excluded from total)	n/a
1	Copenhagen Municipality	(Part of) Copenhagen	Municipality with county tasks	501,158	91.3	5,489.1
2	Frederiksberg Municipality	Frederiksberg	Municipality with county tasks	91,855	8.7	10,560.5
3	Copenhagen County	Glostrup	County	618,529	526	1,175.9
4	Frederiksborg County	Hillerød	County	378,686	1,347	281.1
5	Roskilde County	Roskilde	County	241,523	891	271
6	West Zealand County	Sorø	County	307,207	2,984	103
7	Storstrøm County	Nykøbing	County	262,781	3,398	77.3
8	Funen County	Odense	County	478,347	3,485	137.2
9	South Jutland County	Aabenraa	County	252,433	3,939	64.1
10	Ribe County	Ribe	County	224,261	3,132	71.6
11	Vejle County	Vejle	County	360,921	2,997	120.4
12	Ringkjøbing County	Ringkøbing	County	275,065	4,854	56.7
13	Viborg County	Viborg	County	234,896	4,122	57
14	North Jutland County	Aalborg	County	495,090	6,173	80.2
15	Aarhus County	Århus	County	661,370	4,561	145
16	Bornholm County	Rønne	county (1970–2002), regional municipality with county tasks (2003–2006)	43,347	588	73.7
Denmark		Copenhagen	Entire country	5,427,459	43,093	125.9

Ringkjøbing County used an old spelling of its name, while its capital city and state authorities used the modern Danish spelling, Ringkøbing.

The archipelago Ertholmene, located northeast of Bornholm, have never been a part of a municipality, county, or (from 2007) region. Statistics Denmark calls them Christiansø and Frederiksø, named after the two inhabited islets. They are included in numbers for Denmark (92 inhabitants; 0.39 square kilometers). The land area of Denmark is 42,394 square kilometers.

== See also ==
- ISO 3166-2:DK
- NUTS:DK
- Administrative divisions of Greenland
- List of municipalities of Denmark (1970-2006)
