= Municipalities of Denmark =

Type of administrative division in Denmark

Municipalities of Denmark Kommuner i Danmark (Danish)
- Map showing the post-2007 municipalities of Denmark.
- Category: Municipality
- Location: Denmark
- Found in: Regions
- Number: 98 (as of 2021)

Denmark is divided into five regions, which contain 98 municipalities (Danish: kommuner, [kʰoˈmuːnɐ]; sing. kommune, [-nə]). The Capital Region has 29 municipalities, Southern Denmark 22, Central Denmark 19, Zealand 17 and North Denmark 11. The government intends to merge the Capital and Zealand regions on 1 January 2027 to form the Region of Eastern Denmark. The regional council will have 47 members, and will be elected 18 November 2025 in the ordinary 2025 Danish local elections.

This structure was established per an administrative reform (Danish: Strukturreformen; English: (The) Structural Reform) of the public sector of Denmark, effective 26 June 2005 (council elections 15 November 2005), which abolished the 13 counties (amter; singular amt) and created five regions (regioner; singular region) which unlike the counties (1970–2006) (Danish (singular) amtskommune lit. 'county municipality') are not municipalities. The 270 municipalities were consolidated into 98 larger units, most of which have at least 20,000 inhabitants.

67 of the present municipalities are mergers as a result of the administrative reform, with Ærø being allowed to merge already on 1 January 2006, and one municipality, Bornholm Regional Municipality, being a merger from 1 January 2003, before the reform, that is 68 merged municipalities in all. 238 municipalities were merged 1 January 2007 to form 66 municipalities for a total of 245 merged municipalities in 2003, 2006, and 2007. The 30 remaining municipalities have not merged. Lolland, and Sønderborg each consist of seven former municipalities.

Before the merger on Bornholm there were 275 municipalities and 14 counties. Two sui generis municipalities, namely Copenhagen and Frederiksberg, were never a part of a county, but were counties in their own right.

Many of the responsibilities of the former counties were taken over by the 98 municipalities. With the increased responsibilities, the income tax rate that each of the 98 municipalities levies was raised by three percentage points on 1 January 2007. This tax had once been a part of the tax levied by the former counties.

The archipelago of Ertholmene is not part of any municipality, but is administered by the Ministry of Defence.

The average land area of a Danish municipality is 432.59 km^{2}, 167.08 square miles. The area given in each article about municipalities – and regions – is the total area of land and water, of which the latter can make up a large part for instance in Halsnæs Municipality.

== Legal foundation of municipalities ==
The Constitution of Denmark states: "Article 82. The right of municipalities to manage their own affairs independently, under State supervision, shall be laid down by statute."

=== Councillors ===
2,522 municipal councillors (and 205 regional councillors) were elected on Tuesday 15 November 2005, being the first councils elected since the new reform. In 1997 there were 4,685 municipal and 374 county councillors in the then-275 municipalities and 14 counties. As an example of the reduction in the number of councillors, Bornholm in the 1970s and 1980s had a total of 122 councillors (from 1999:89) in five municipalities and one county (18 county councillors in the 1990s [from 1999: 15]). After the merger on 1 January 2003, of the five municipalities and the county, there was one single municipal council with 27 municipal councillors. They were reduced to 23 from 1 January 2018. After 1 January 2007, when Bornholm Regional Municipality lost its (short-lived – four years: 2003 until 2006) county privileges, there has been talk of a reduction to 19 municipal councillors, the guidelines for a municipality with over 20,000 inhabitants being a maximum of 31 and minimum of 19 municipal councillors and the guidelines for a municipality with less than 20,000 inhabitants being a maximum of 31 and minimum of 9 municipal councillors. These guidelines replaced the old guidelines with the council elections in 2005 after the laws initiating the structural reform were passed in parliament. Many newly formed municipalities have chosen to have a maximum number of councillors so that all parts of the new municipalities and the small political parties have a chance of representation in the new councils: Copenhagen Municipality has 55 municipal councillors on its council, and populous municipalities such as Århus and Aalborg, and Frederiksberg (Frb from 1 January 2026) have 31 each, and Odense has 29. Gentofte (from 17 to 19 councillors in elections 2009), Glostrup (from 17 to 19 cllrs in 2009), Hørsholm (from 15 to 19 cllrs in 2005), Ishøj (from 17 to 19 cllrs in 2009), Solrød (from 15 to 19 cllrs in 2009), and Tårnby (from 17 to 19 cllrs in 2009) are examples of municipalities that have increased the number of councillors because of the new guidelines.

Council elections are held on the third Tuesday of November every four years.

The newly formed five regional and 66 municipal councils acted as transitional merger committees (sammenlægningsudvalg) in 2006 with the responsibility of arranging the mergers (singular sammenlægning) of the old counties and municipalities into five and 66 new entities respectively. The 238 municipal councils and 13 county councils that were to be merged and replaced/abolished just continued their work one extra year beyond the fixed four-year term of office they were elected for (2002–2005) until 2006, and then ceased to exist. 32 municipalities including those of the recently formed Ærø Municipality (which was included in the reform) and Bornholm Regional Municipality (which was not merged as a result of the reform, merger decided locally by voters already 29 May 2001 and made effective from 1 January 2003) remained unchanged and were not merged with other municipalities.

Local elections have also been held in odd years earlier, but immediately before 1 January 1979, when the fiscal year in the public sector was changed from 1 April until 31 March into 1 January until 31 December, local elections were held in March and the elected councillors took their seats the following month, 1 April. Elections were held in even years (a few examples given here): March 1966, March 1970, March 1974, March 1978. Term of office for local politicians elected in 1978 was 1 April 1978 until 31 December 1981. Local elections were held in November 1981 for the four-year term of office (1 January) 1982 – (31 December) 1985. November 1985 local elections were for the following four-year term of office (1986–1989), etc. The election pages can be accessed from the templates at the bottom of each election page.

Number of municipal councillors elected and term of office:

- Elections November 2005: 2006/07–2009: 2,522
- Elections November 2009: 2010–2013: 2,468
- Elections November 2013: 2014–2017: 2,444
- Elections November 2017: 2018–2021: 2,432 (table shows number of seats on each municipal council)
- Elections November 2021: 2022–2025: 2,436 (Frederiksberg Municipality has increased its council from 25 to 29 members)
- Elections November 2025: 2026 – 2029: 2,432. Only four regional councils are elected with 134 councillors, a reduction from the previous five councils with 205 councillors.

== History ==
Municipalities distributed according to number of inhabitants
Inhabitants	Number of municipalities		
Inhabitants	Before 1 April 1970	From 1 April 1974	From 1 January 2007
> 150,000	1	4	4
100,000–150,000	3	1	2
40,000–100,000	10	18	50
20,000–40,000	22	25	35
15,000–20,000	13	24	0
10,000–15,000	22	41	3
3,000–10,000	206	160	3
< 3,000	821	2	1
Total	1,098	275	98

=== Before 1970 ===
Until the municipal reform of 1 April 1970, the number of councillors in Danish municipalities and counties was around 10,000 in around 1,000 parish municipalities (sognekommuner), being supervised by their county, and market city municipalities (købstadskommuner), the latter numbering 86 (including Bornholm whose county as an exception supervised the county's six market city municipalities (of 21 in total)) and not being part of a county but being supervised by the Interior Ministry.

The reform was initiated from 1958 by the Interior Minister Søren Olesen, (1891–1973), a member of the Justice Party of Denmark.

The number of municipalities was reduced during the period from April 1962 to 1966 when 398 existing municipalities merged voluntarily to form 118 new ones. The number of municipalities was the highest in 1965, at 1345 – with more than 10,000 councillors – of which 88 were market city municipalities, including Copenhagen and Frederiksberg, and 1257 were parish municipalities (821 (the least populous; see table) of which had no staff employed except the mayor and treasurer/supervisor of the administration (Danish kæmner – a term last used until 1996 – in Sindal, today a part of Hjørring Municipality), both employed part-time).

=== Municipal reform of 1970 ===
In 1970, a municipal reform ended the distinction between parish municipalities and market city municipalities. With the reform of 1970, the term municipality (kommune) replaced the previous two terms, which are now never used except for historical purposes. By 1 April 1970, the 1098 municipalities existing at the start of 1970 (with around 10,000 councillors) were merged to form 277 new municipalities.

A few years later, the number was slightly reduced again to 275 as a few municipalities in Copenhagen County merged. 1 April 1974, Sengeløse municipality merged with Høje-Taastrup Municipality, and Store Magleby parish merged with Dragør parish to form the new Dragør Municipality. The voters of Sengeløse – which was created a municipality 1 April 1970 but only existed until 31 March 1974, being deemed too small in population – and Store Magleby parish were almost exclusively owner-occupiers, who voted center-rightwing in elections for the municipal council, whereas Høje-Taastrup Municipality and Dragør parish consisted of mainly tenants who rented their apartments and who voted center-leftwing, so heated debates took place before the mergers, because the center-rightwing voters in the merged municipalities would be in minority at the elections. (Since 1 January 1962 only two mayors of Høje-Taastrup have been Social Democrats, namely Per Søndergaard from 1 April 1978 until 31 December 1981 (three years and nine months), and Anders Bak (1948–2006) from 1986 until 2005 (20 years); Michael Ziegler, Conservative People's Party, has been mayor from 1 January 2006). Thus the number of municipalities was 277 from 1 April 1970 to 1 April 1974, from that date dropping to 275. Also on 1 April 1974, Avedøre, which was part of Glostrup Municipality, was conjoined with Hvidovre Municipality. This combination was logical, as Avedøre borders Hvidovre, but is separated from Glostrup. Other minor municipal border adjustments - between 100 and 150 - were made 1 April 1972, sometimes moving an area from the jurisdiction of a municipality in one county to the jurisdiction of a municipality in another county.

Many of the 275 municipalities after 1 April 1974 built large city halls to consolidate the administration, thus changing the cityscape of Denmark. It also consolidated other municipal enterprises and the purchase of goods and services from the private sector.

Until 1978 the fiscal year lasted from 1 April to 31 March in the public sector following a law passed in 1849. As a consequence of a law passed by the Folketing in 1976, from 1 January 1979 the fiscal year is concurrent with the calendar year. Many reforms and laws passed prior to 1979 therefore have effect from 1 April.

The 275 municipalities existed from 1 April 1974 until 31 December 2002, when the five municipalities on Bornholm merged with the county to form Bornholm regional municipality, in the process abolishing the county and thereby reducing the number of counties to 13. This brought the number of municipalities down to 271 from 1 January 2003.

=== Municipal reform of 2007 ===
After the general election in 2001 and the formation of a new government, a new municipal reform was discussed. Among the reasons advanced in favour of the reform were more synergies through economies of scale (critical mass and greater professional and financial sustainability) and big item discounts and the possibility of offering a wider array of services closer to the public (via a one-stop place of access to the public sector not unlike the unitary councils). Also, the reform was intended to alleviate the financial problems of depopulation in some areas due to limited job opportunities, high unemployment and aging, and to make introduction of new information technology more affordable. In short: fewer people, fewer municipalities.

A commission on structural reform was set up by the government 1 October 2002 and presented its report 9 January 2004. It was then presented to politicians, researchers, and journalists, more than 1,000 in all, 14 January 2004 in Vingstedcentret in Egtved Municipality near Vejle. The government put forward a proposal in April 2004, and a parliamentary majority backing the reform was secured 24 June 2004 when the Danish People's Party (then 22 seats) said it would support an agreement with the government coalition of Venstre (then 56 seats) and the Conservative People's Party (then 16 seats), thus securing 94 seats (90 needed for a majority in the 179 seat Folketing). The laws behind the mergers were subjected to a hearing from 1 December 2004 to collect opinions – for or against or to modify the laws – from organisations and individuals. After the national election of 2005 a final agreement merging many municipalities, as well as abolishing the 13 counties and setting up five regions, was reached by the parties Venstre, Conservative People's Party, Danish People's Party, Social Democratic Party and Det Radikale Venstre. Presented in February 2005 to the Folketing, the lawmakers finally approved the last of the 50 bills needed for the mergers by voting for the bills 16 June 2005. The laws became effective 26 June 2005, as always the day after publication in Lovtidende. Half of the bills received support from more political parties than the three parties with the political majority of 94 seats. Then the mergers were specified and approved in a departmental order (Danish: ministeriel bekendtgørelse) signed 29 June 2005 by Lars Løkke Rasmussen, then minister of the interior and health. As a curiosity, all of Billund Airport, then partly located in Give Municipality, became a part of Billund Municipality, and any future expansion of the airport will also become a part of that municipality. The first elections to the new regions and municipalities were held in November 2005.

The reform replaced the structure of municipalities and counties introduced with the reform of 1970. Three sui generis municipalities who were also counties lost their county privileges and became part of the Capital Region of Denmark, although one of these three municipalities, Bornholm, which was created 1 January 2003 after the merger of its county with the five municipalities was approved in a law by the Folketing 19 March 2002 – thereby abolishing one of the 14 counties in the process – because of its remote location 150 km (93 mi) southeast of Copenhagen retains some regional functions and is thus called a de facto regional municipality. It performs some tasks that are only performed by the regions in the rest of Denmark. (From 1 January 2016 and 2018 Ærø Municipality and Fanø Municipality, respectively, will also handle a task on the islands which was formerly the responsibility of the Region of Southern Denmark, namely public mass transit.)

Almost all the mergers of the municipalities took place 1 January 2007, but Marstal municipality and Ærøskøbing municipality, both on the island of Ærø, after a referendum on the island had decided to merge the two municipalities, were allowed by the Danish government to merge already from 1 January 2006 to form Ærø municipality, thus bringing the number of municipalities down to 270 that were finally reduced by mergers from 1 January 2007 to form 98 municipalities.

=== Sectors affected ===
Since the counties were not the only structure based on the municipal layout of Denmark, other related changes were carried out as well. Thus, police districts (reduced from 54 to 12), court districts (reduced from 82 to 24), tax districts (before 2007 the responsibility of the municipalities; after that part of the central government Ministry of Taxation), electoral wards, and parishes in the Church of Denmark also were reduced in number following the municipal reform.

=== Number of politicians ===
The 2007 reform reduced the number of local and regional politicians by almost half to 2,522 (municipal councillors) (council elections November 2005; reduced in the 2009 elections to 2,468; in 2013 2,444; in 2017 2,432) (1978: 4,735; 1989: 4,826; 1998: 4,685; reduced somewhat in the council election 29 May 2002 in the municipality of Bornholm) and 205, in the 2025 local election 134 (regional board councillors) (1998: 374 county board councillors) respectively. A new region will be established from 1 January 2027, merging the two regions in Eastern Denmark. In 2025 134 councillors were elected to the regional board councils of the four regions.

== List of municipalities ==
=== 1970–2006 ===
Until 31 December 2006 Denmark was divided into 13 counties, and 270 municipalities.

== Municipal organisations and enterprises ==
- Center for offentlig kompetenceudvikling

== See also ==
- NUTS statistical regions of Denmark
- ISO 3166-2:DK
- First-level NUTS of the European Union
- Articles in other languages:
  - Referendum on merger of municipalities on Bornholm 29 May 2001, approved by voters (Danish)
  - Referendum on merger of Holstebro and Struer municipalities 3 December 2015, rejected by voters (Danish)
  - Administrative reform in Estonia 1 November 2017 (Estonian)
  - Municipal reform in Norway, finalized 2020 (Norwegian)
  - Regional reform in Norway (Norwegian)
  - Regional health corporations in Norway, merged health and hospital regions (Norwegian)
  - Reform of Norwegian police districts 2015 (Norwegian)
