= Hvidt & Mølgaard =

Danish design and architectural firm

Hvidt & Mølgaard was a Copenhagen-based, Danish design and architectural firm which existed from 1944 until 2009. Founded by Peter Hvidt and Orla Mølgaard-Nielsen, it continued to thrive after the founders' retirement but was split in two in 2009, forming Hvidt Arkitekter and Holsøe Arkitekter.

== History ==
Both Hvidt and Mølgaard had a background in furniture design and their studio's early work was within this field.

The firm increasingly took on architectural assignments. Projects covered office buildings and factories, including the De Danske Sukkerfabrikker building in Copenhagen (1958), as well as single-family houses and collective housing projects in Søllerød, Hillerød and Birkerød (1962–1970). They also designed the new Little Belt Bridge which was built from 1965 to 1970. Hans Kristensen joined the firm in 1970 while Peter Hvidt retired from it in 1975. In 1975 the firm designed the Vejle Fjord Bridge which was completed in 1980.

From 1983 the firm was run by Hans Kristensen (b. 1933), Peter Holsøe (b. 1943) and Peter Hvidt's son Henrik Hvidt (b. 1945). Later works include buildings for Nokia (1996) and DONG in Copenhagen's South Docklands, two masterplans for major harbour redevelopments in Estonia(Noblessner), and new headquarters for ESRI, a software development company in California.

== Split ==
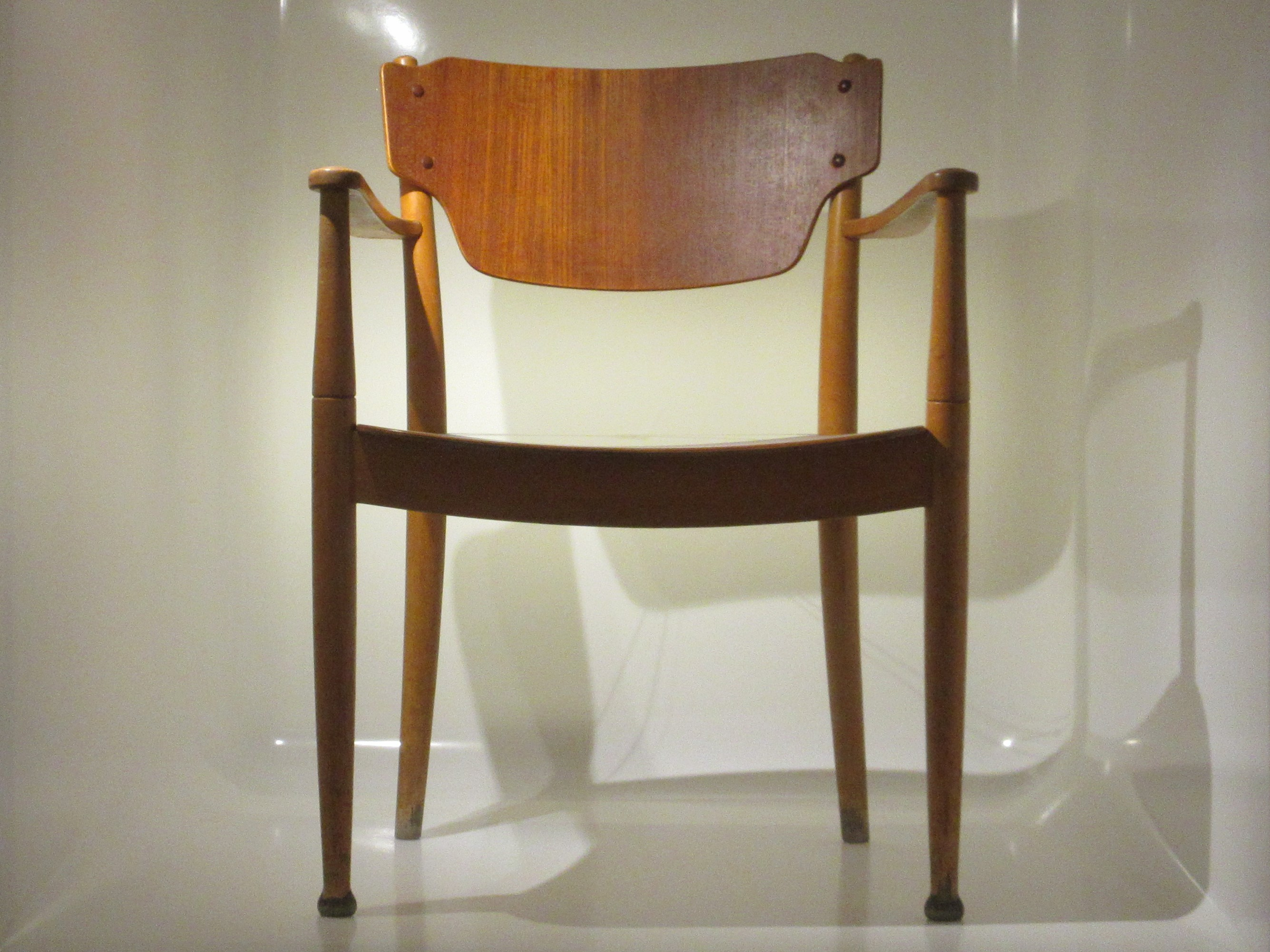
Portex chair, 1945, Danish Design Museum, Copenhagen

In 2009 it was decided to split the firm in two. The company was divided into:

- Holsøe Arkitekter – owned by Peter Holsøe and Marius Holsøe
- Hvidt Arkitekter – owned by Henrik Hvidt and Marius Lorentzen

ESRI Headquarters have subsequently been completed by Hvidt Architects.

== Selected works ==
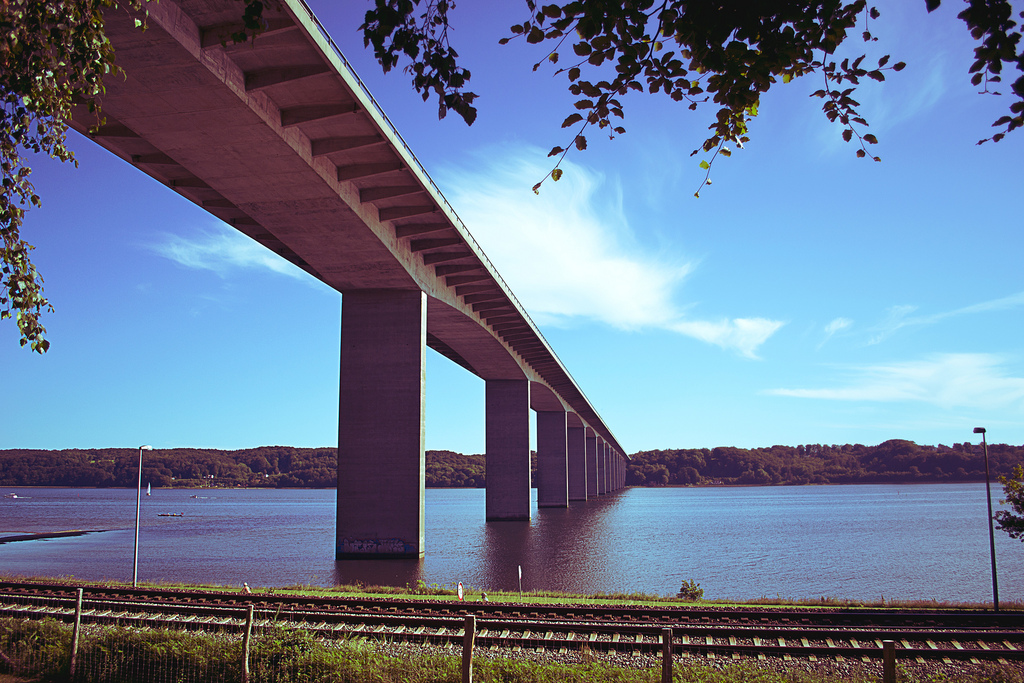
Vejle Fjord Bridge

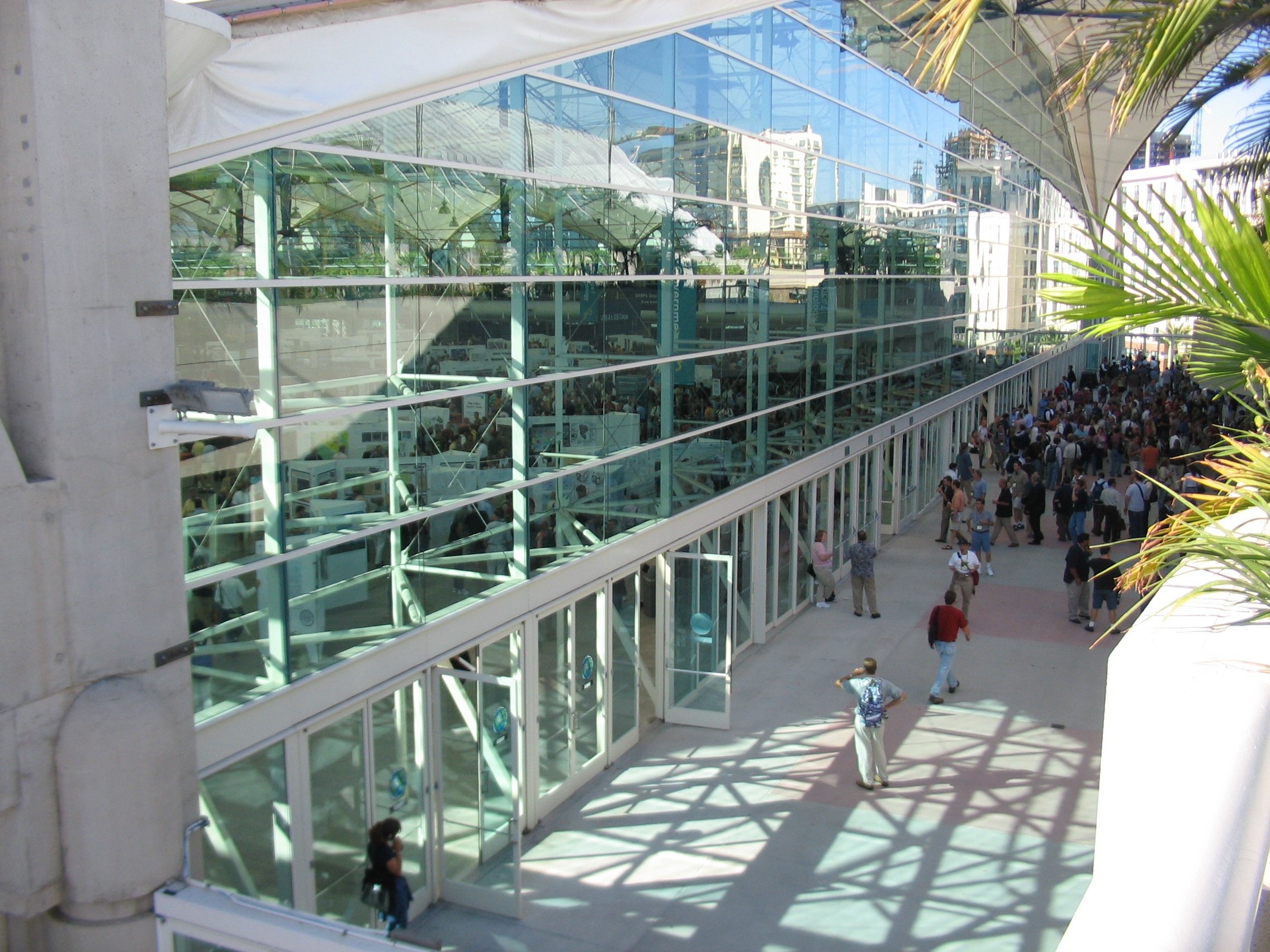
ESRI Headquarters (010)

- Little Belt Bridge, Denmark (1970)
- Vejle Fjord Bridge, Vejle, Denmark (1980)
- Nokia Denmark, Copenhagen (1996)
- SeaSite shipyard redevelopment masterplan, Noblessner, Estonia (competition win 2007)
- Harbour redevelopment masterplan Tallinn, Estonia
- Zinc House, Amerikas Plads, Copenhagen (2008)
- ESRI Headquarters (completed by Hvidt Arkitekter), Redlands, California, U.S.A. (2010)
- Teglværks Bridge, Copenhagen 2010)
