= Peter Hvidt =

Danish architect and furniture designer (1916–1986)

Peter Hvidt (6 February 1916 – 13 October 1986) was a Danish architect and furniture designer, co-founder of Hvidt & Mølgaard.

== Biography ==
Hvidt was born in Copenhagen in 1916, the son of L. N. Hvidt, president of the Danish Maritime and Commercial Court. After completing his training at the Design School in Copenhagen, he worked at various design firms before setting up his own studio in 1942. In 1944 he opened the Hvidt & Mølgaard studio which he ran with Orla Mølgaard-Nielsen until 1975. They created a number of pioneering sets of furniture including Portex (1945) and Ax (1950), using a laminated technique for production by Fritz Hansen. The chairs were specially designed for export, economizing on space and packaging requirements for transportation.

Hvidt & Mølgaard increasingly took on architectural assignments (from 1970 together with Hans Kristensen). Projects covered office buildings and factories, including the De Danske Sukkerfabrikker building in Copenhagen (1958), as well as collective housing projects in Søllerød, Hillerød and Birkerød (1962–1970), all completed in a light, clear and simple style. The firm also acted as consultants on the new Little Belt Bridge (1970) (1970) and the Vejle Fjord Bridge (1980), playing an important part in the success of their designs.

== Recognition ==
Hvidt received the Diplome d'Honneur at the Triennale in Milan in 1951 and 1954. His works are represented at the MOMA in New York, the National Gallery in Melbourne and the Danish Museum of Art & Design in Copenhagen.

== See also ==
- Danish modern
- Danish design
