= Lars-Henrik Schmidt =

Danish philosopher (1953–2021)

Lars-Henrik Schmidt (27 August 1953 – 10 September 2021) was a Danish idea-historian and philosopher. Since the early 1980s the pivotal point of his writings has been the development of a specific philosophical perspective termed Social Analytics.

== Career ==
Schmidt was born in 1953 in Vejle.

MA, History of Ideas, University of Aarhus (1977); prize thesis (1976); Ph.D. (1981); dr. phil. (1988).

Part time lecturer in Sociology of Culture, University of Copenhagen (1978); PhD scholar, research fellow and senior research fellow, University of Aarhus (1976–82); associate professor, Department of the History of Ideas, University of Aarhus (1982–87), senior associate professor, same place (from 1987); Director of Research of the graduate school of the Humanities (1988–91); centre director of Centre for Cultural Research, University of Aarhus (1993–96), research professor, same place (from 1994); Director of The Danish Institute of Education (1996–2000); rector of The Danish University of Education (2000–07), professor of philosophy, same place; dean of The Danish School of Education, University of Aarhus (2007); Director of research of Research Centre GNOSIS, University of Aarhus (from 2007), professor of philosophy, same place (from 2007).

Member of The Danish Council of Ethics (1997–2001). Chairman of The Danish Council of Art Schools in Film and Theatre (1998–2001).

== Works (in selection) ==
- Den sociale excorsisme eller den tabte umiddelbarhed - konstruktion af det sociale hos Rousseau og Nietzsche (Århus, 1987)
  - Immediacy Lost - Construction of the social in Rousseau an Nietzsche (Copenhagen 1988)
- Viljen til orden (Århus, 1988)
  - Der Wille zur Ordnung (Århus, 1989)
- Tragik der Aufklärung - Nietzsches kritik der Metaphysik (Århus, 1989)
- Libertinerens natur - Sade som anledning (Århus, 1994)
  - The libertines nature translation: Stacey M. Cozart og Lotte Broe (Copenhagen, 2005)
- Om respekten (Copenhagen, 2005)
  - On Respect (in press, Copenhagen, 2009)
- On Thinking (Copenhagen, 2008)

== Sources ==
- Den Store Danske Encyklopædi
- Filosofisk Leksikon (2008) Denmark. Gyldendal. P. 421.
- Kraks Blå Bog 2008/09 (2008) Copenhagen. Gads Forlag. P. 1039–1040.
- World List of Universities (2004) The International Association of Universities. Palgrave. P. 454.
