= Vejle =

City in Jutland, Denmark

- City
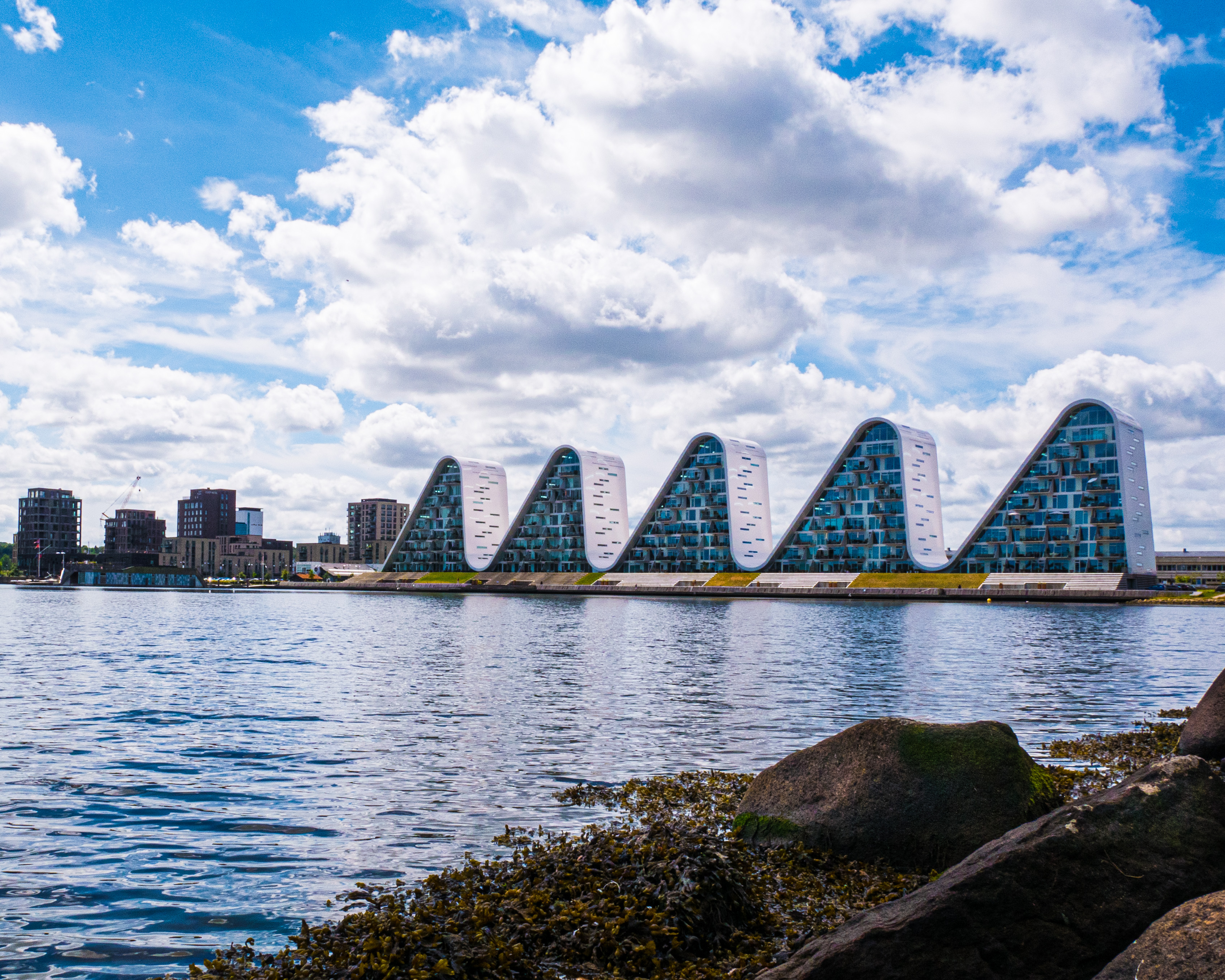
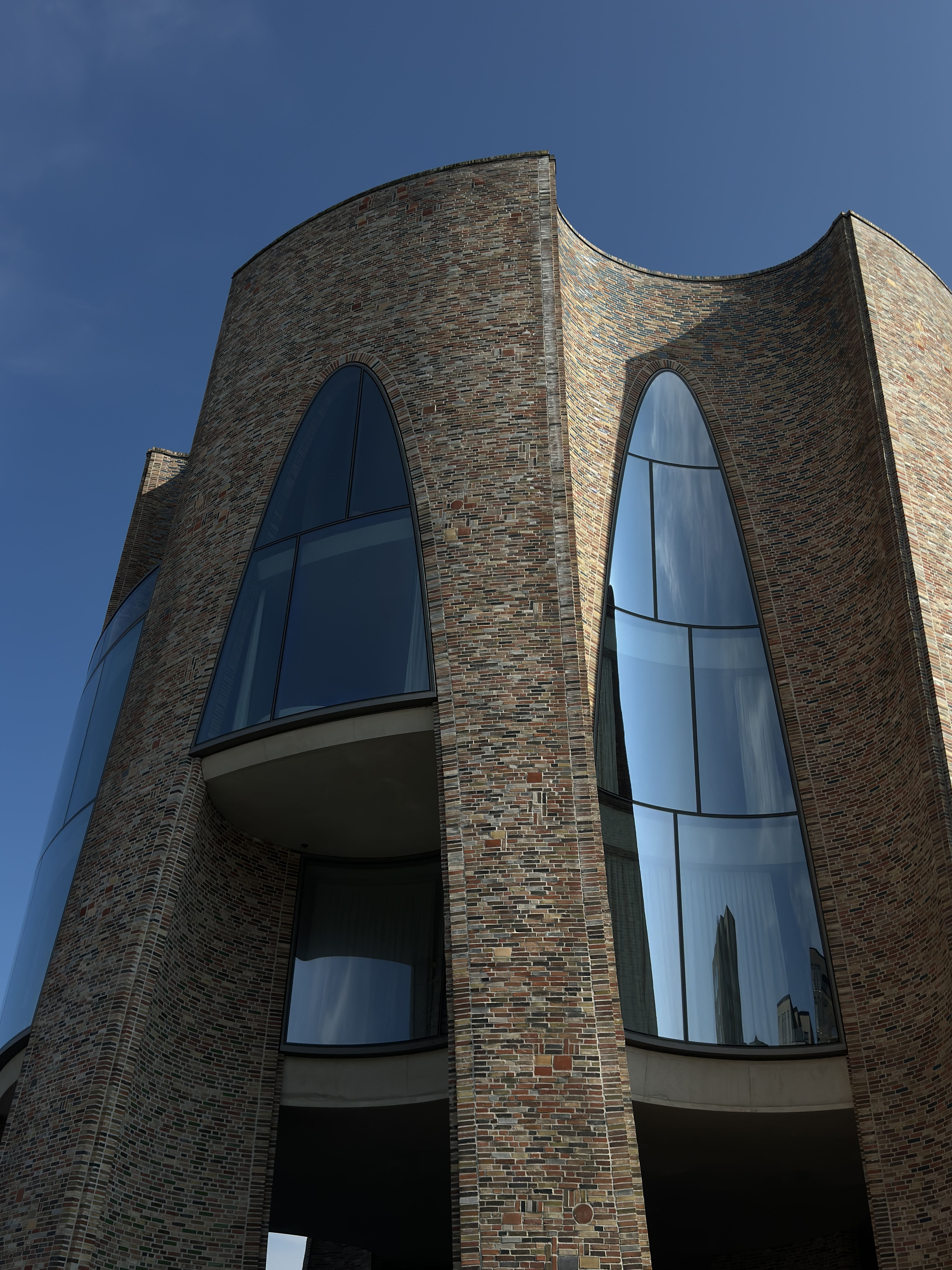
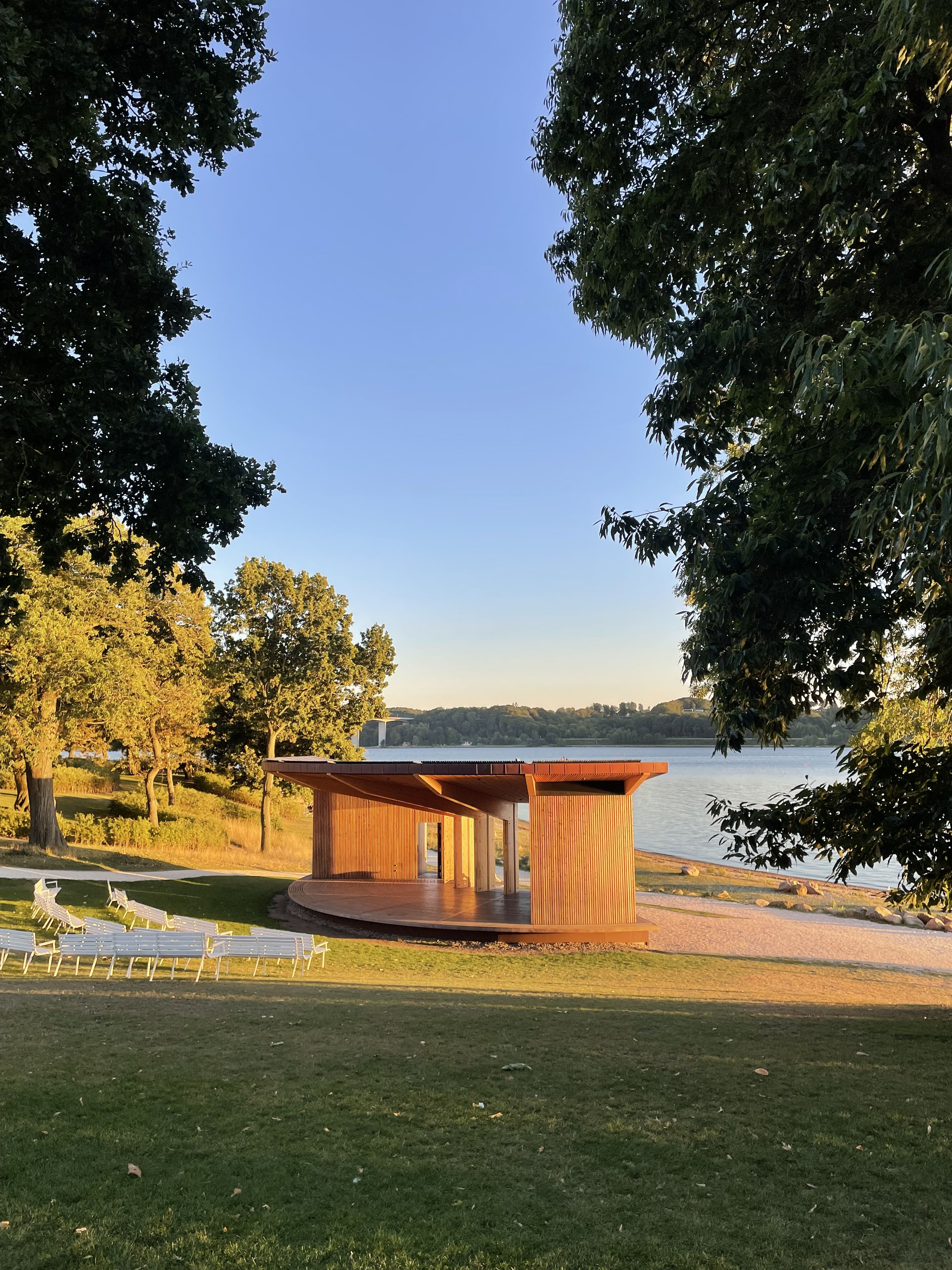
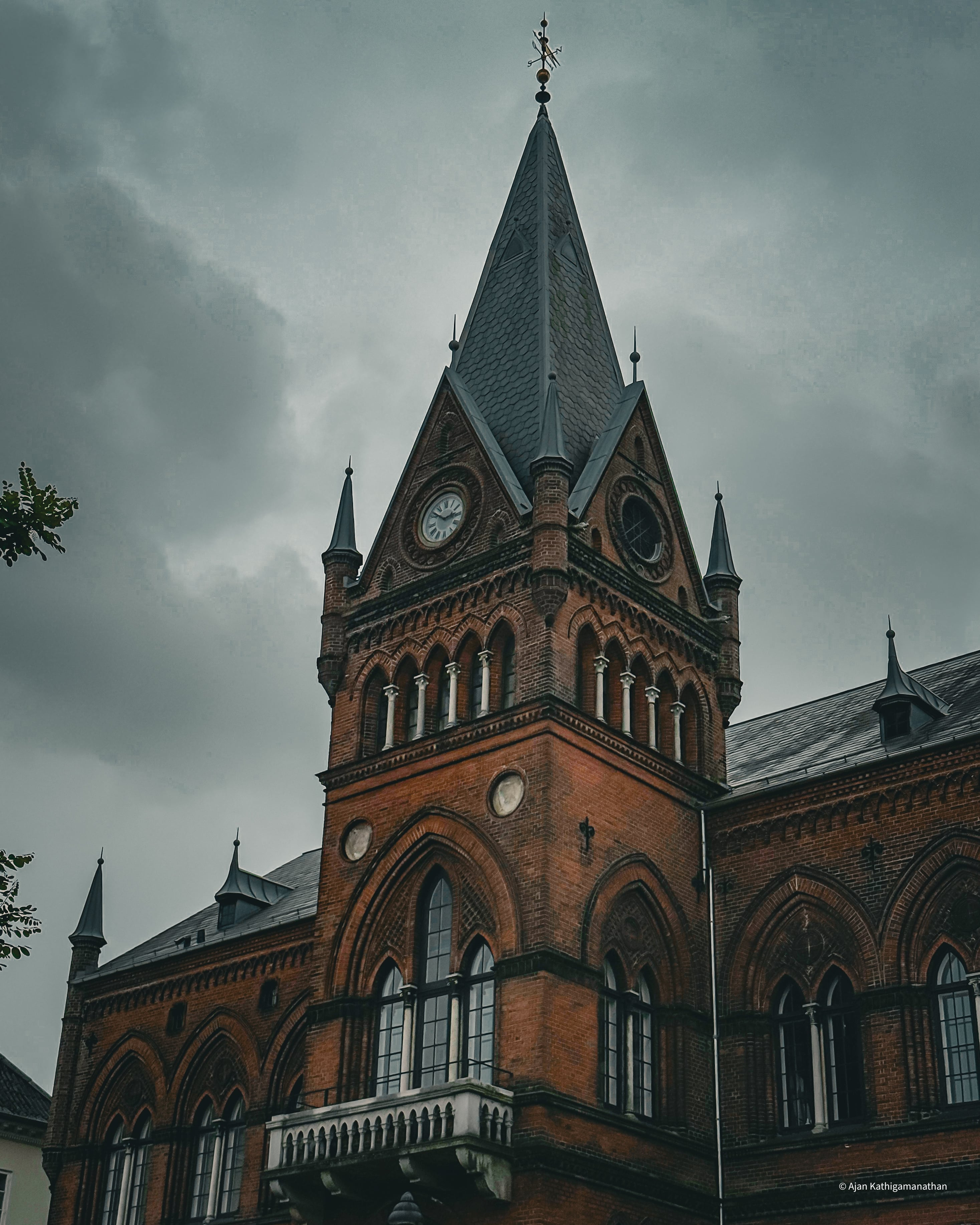
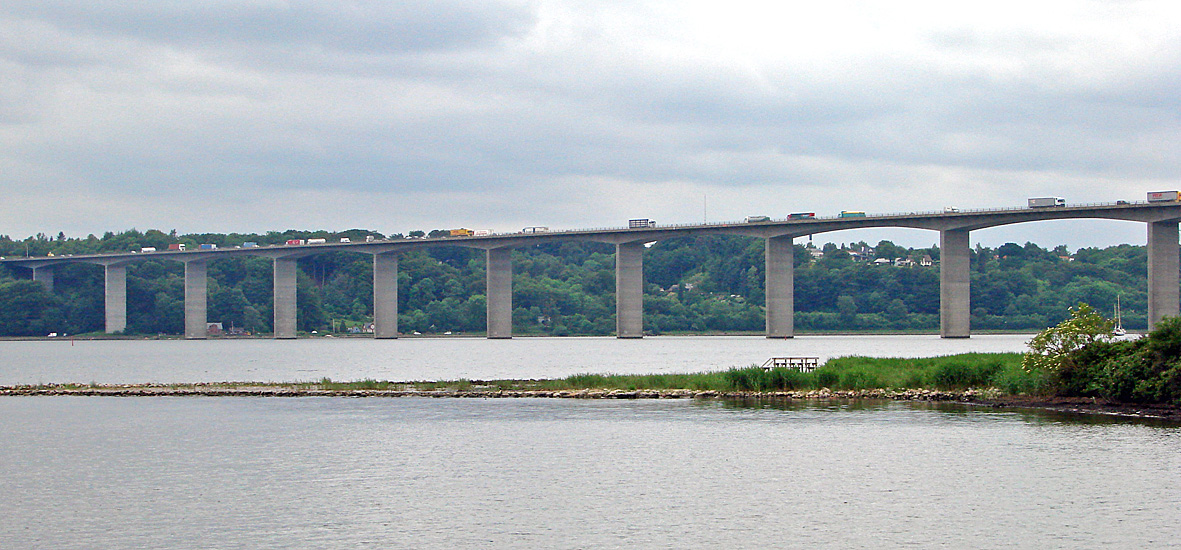
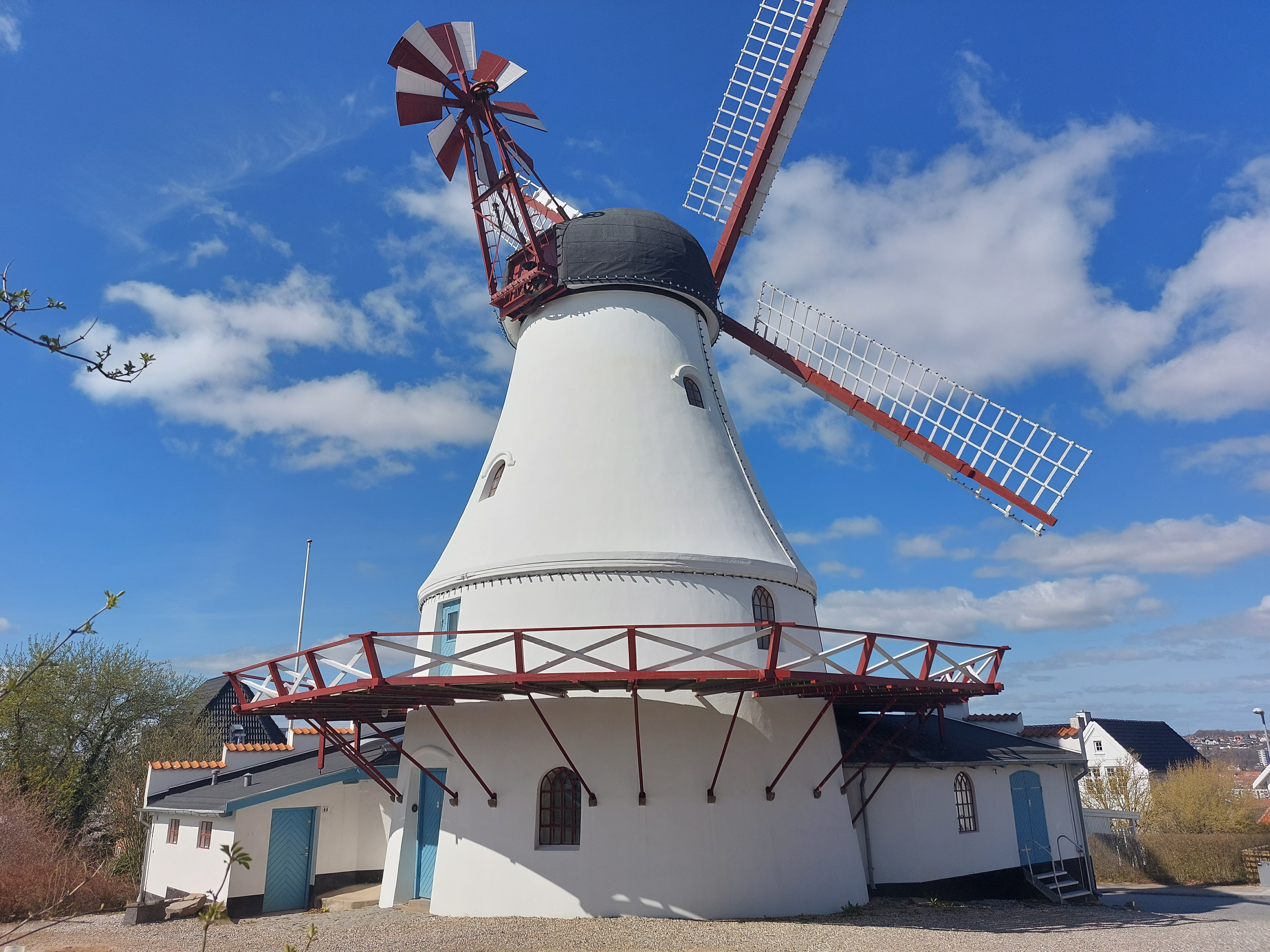
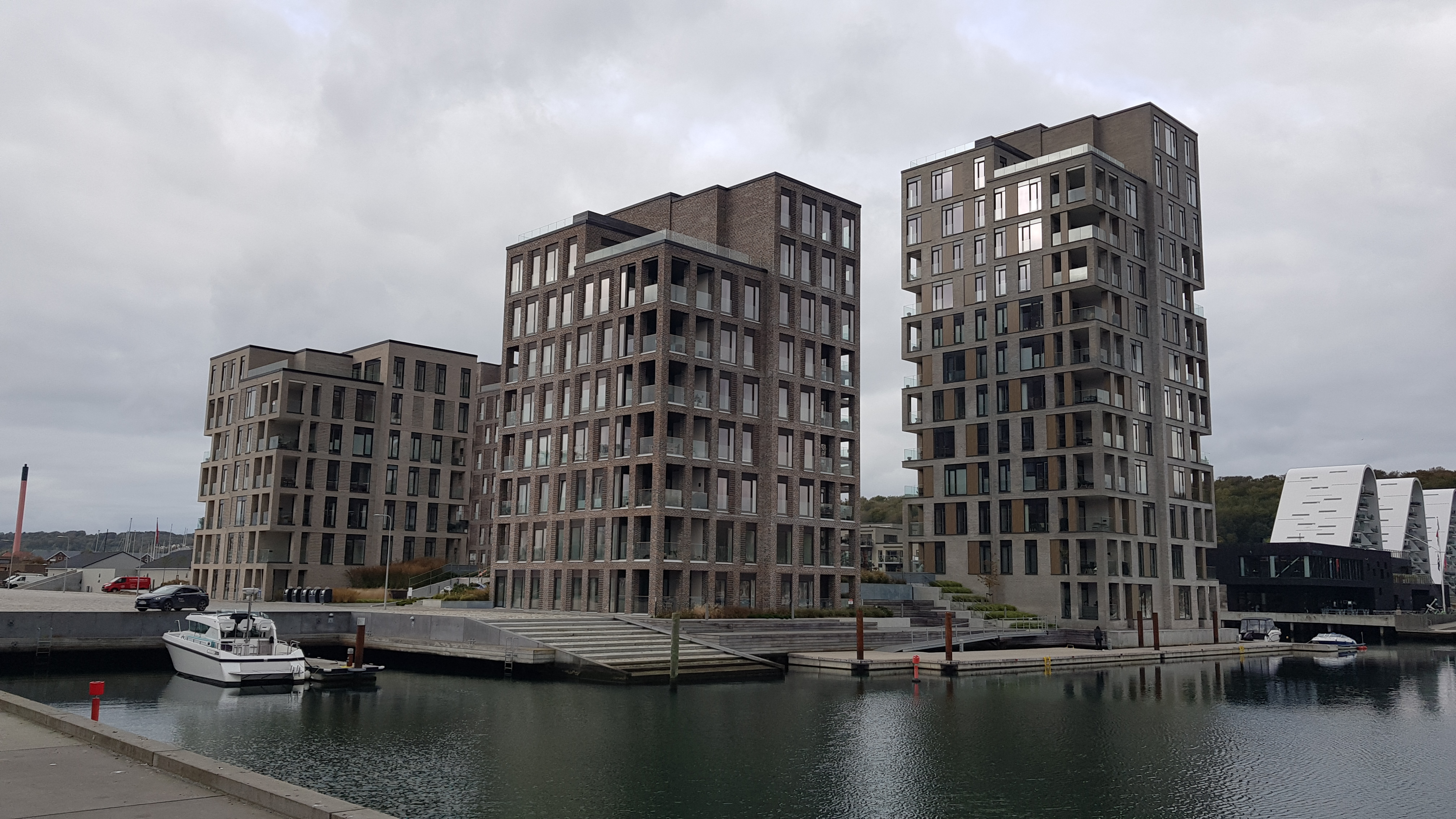
- The Wave (Vejle) and the Vejle Waterfront Fjordenhus Skyttehushaven City Hall Vejle Fjord Bridge Vejle Windmill Building complexes at Havneøen

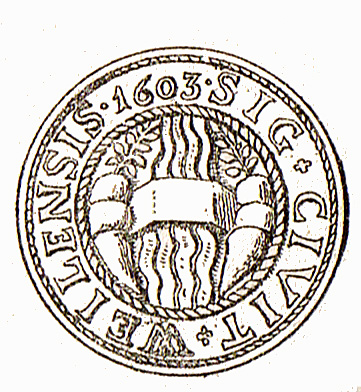
- Seal Coat of arms
- Motto: Vejle med vilje (Vejle on purpose)
- Location in Denmark Vejle (Region of Southern Denmark)
- Coordinates: 55°43′N 9°32′E
- Country: Denmark
- Region: Southern Denmark (Syddanmark)
- Municipality: Vejle
- First mentioned: 1256
- Municipal charter: 1327

Government
  - Mayor: Jens Ejner Christensen (V)

Area
  - Urban: 34.1 km^{2} (13.2 sq mi)
  - Municipality: 1,066.32 km^{2} (411.71 sq mi)
- Highest elevation: 93 m (305 ft)
- Lowest elevation: 0 m (0 ft)

Population (1. January 2026)
  - Rank: Denmark: 9th
  - Urban: 62,153
  - Urban density: 1,820/km^{2} (4,720/sq mi)
  - Municipal: 123,250
  - Triangle region: 436,488
- Demonym: Vejlenser
- Time zone: UTC+1 (CET)
  - Summer (DST): UTC+2 (CEST)
- Postal code: 7100, 7120
- Area code: (+45)
- Website: vejle.dk

Vejle (Danish pronunciation: [ˈvɑjlə]) is a city in Denmark, in the southeast of the Jutland Peninsula at the head of Vejle Fjord, where the Vejle River and Grejs River and their valleys converge. It is the site of the councils of Vejle Municipality (kommune) and the Region of Southern Denmark. The city has a population of 62,153 (As of 1 January. 2026), making it the ninth largest city in Denmark. Vejle Municipality has a population of 123,250 (as of January 2026), making it the fifth most populous municipality in Denmark. The city is part of the Triangle Region, which includes the neighbouring cities of Kolding and Fredericia. Vejle is located 110 kilometres (68 miles) north of Germany, 70 kilometres (43,5 miles) from Aarhus and 240 kilometres (149 miles) from the capital Copenhagen.

Vejle is most known for its forested hills, wetlands, Vejle fjord, harbour, shopping, pedestrian street, windmill, and newly built award-winning architecture.

== Etymology ==
The name "Vejle" derives from the Old Danish word wæthel, meaning "ford" or "wading place" due to its location at a busy crossing over the Vejle River.

The name has also been through a lot of evolution in spelling since Wæthel, as seen on maps throughout history, and in documents referring to the town/city, some examples are such as:

- Wæthel
- Wedel
- Vedel
- Weile
- Veyle
- Veile
- Vejle (Most prominent today)

Vejle has also historically been Latinized as:

- Wellea
- Weilensis

== History ==
=== Origins ===
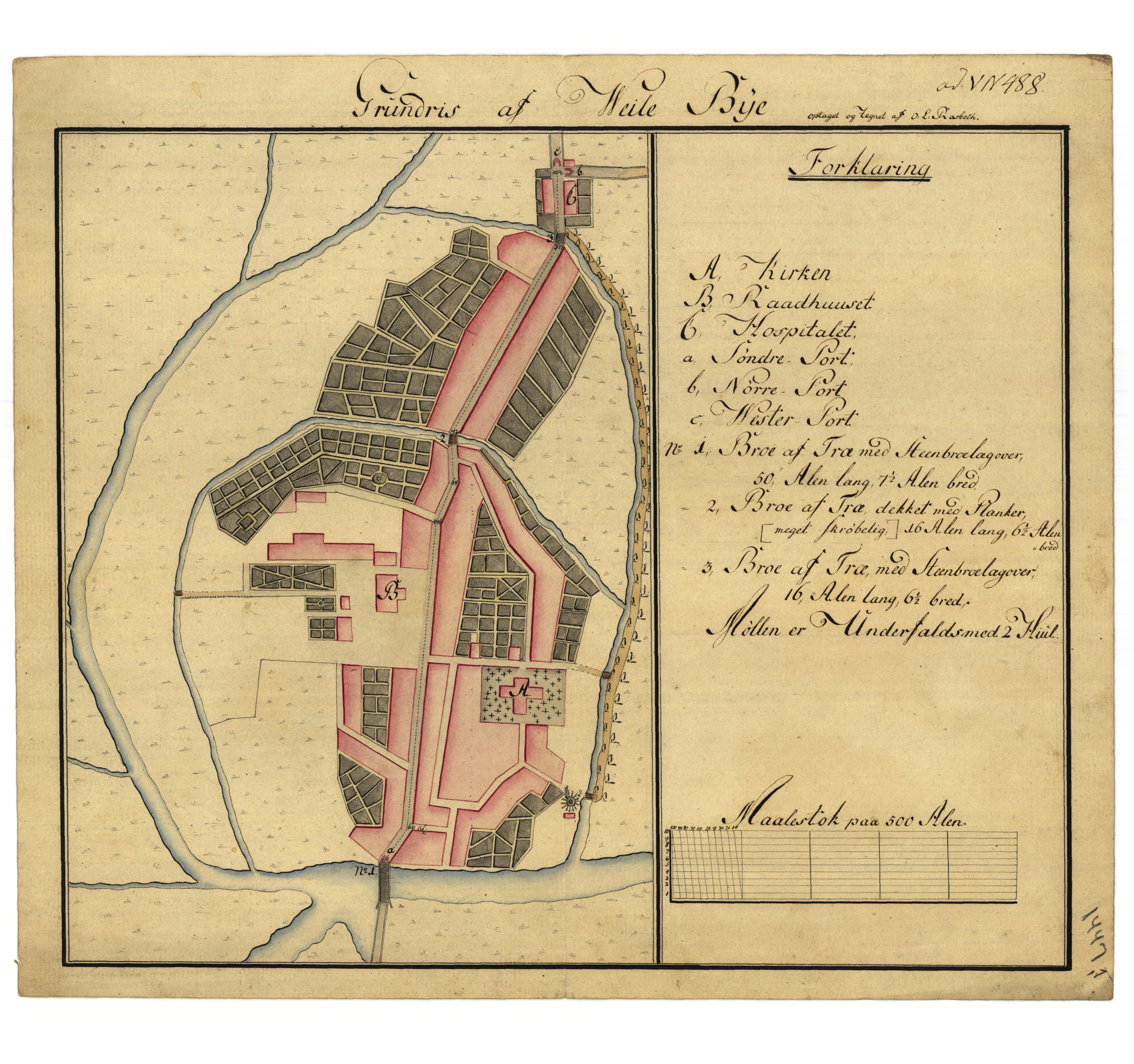
Map of Vejle, before the Industrial Revolution

Vejle was originally built on a small islet that was surrounded by Omløbsåen to the west, Mølleåen to the east, and Vejle River to the south. It was only after the Industrial Revolution, that the city expanded beyond the river borders.

During Viking times, the wetlands around Vejle had to be crossed at the Ravning Bridge, a 760-meter long wooden boardwalk, built around 980 ad, located west of the current city.

Archaeological digs near St. Nicolai Church in downtown Vejle have shown that there were residences in the area as far back as 1100. The first recorded mention of the town is from 1256, and the first known merchant town privileges were issued by King Valdemar III in 1327.

=== Middle ages ===
During the Middle Ages, Vejle was a prominent market town. It developed slowly, only having small setbacks from the Black Death during the 14th century. Vejle traditionally traded with cities such as Lübeck, Aarhus and Flensburg, located in the old duchies of Schleswig and Holstein, and other cities on the Baltic coast.

Vejle used to be protected by two castles:

Castrum Wæthel (Vejleborg) (Vejle Castle)

The Vejle castle was constructed out of wood and lay just outside the city, where Vejle railway station is located today. It was constructed to protect the city and the Vejle River. The architecture of the castle indicates it was built in the 14th century, but by the year 1473 the castle had most likely been decommissioned. being turned into fields. The last remnants of the castle disappeared through the construction of the railway in the 19th century.

Rosborg

Rosborg was located in the marshlands of the Vejle Valley, located a couple hundred meters west of the city. It sat atop a manmade hill around 1.75 meters high, 40 meters long, and 25 meters wide. There had been multiple buildings in the castle, the oldest of these being seemingly made of wood and possibly burning down; later another was made of stone. During an excavation in 1912, there were found multiple sets of pottery from the Rhine, one with a very distinctive face of a bearded man.

=== Early modern period ===
In the late 17th and early 18th centuries, Vejle's population was diminished as a consequence of plague and war. In 1796, though, Vejle was made the seat of the newly founded Vejle County.

=== Industrialisation ===
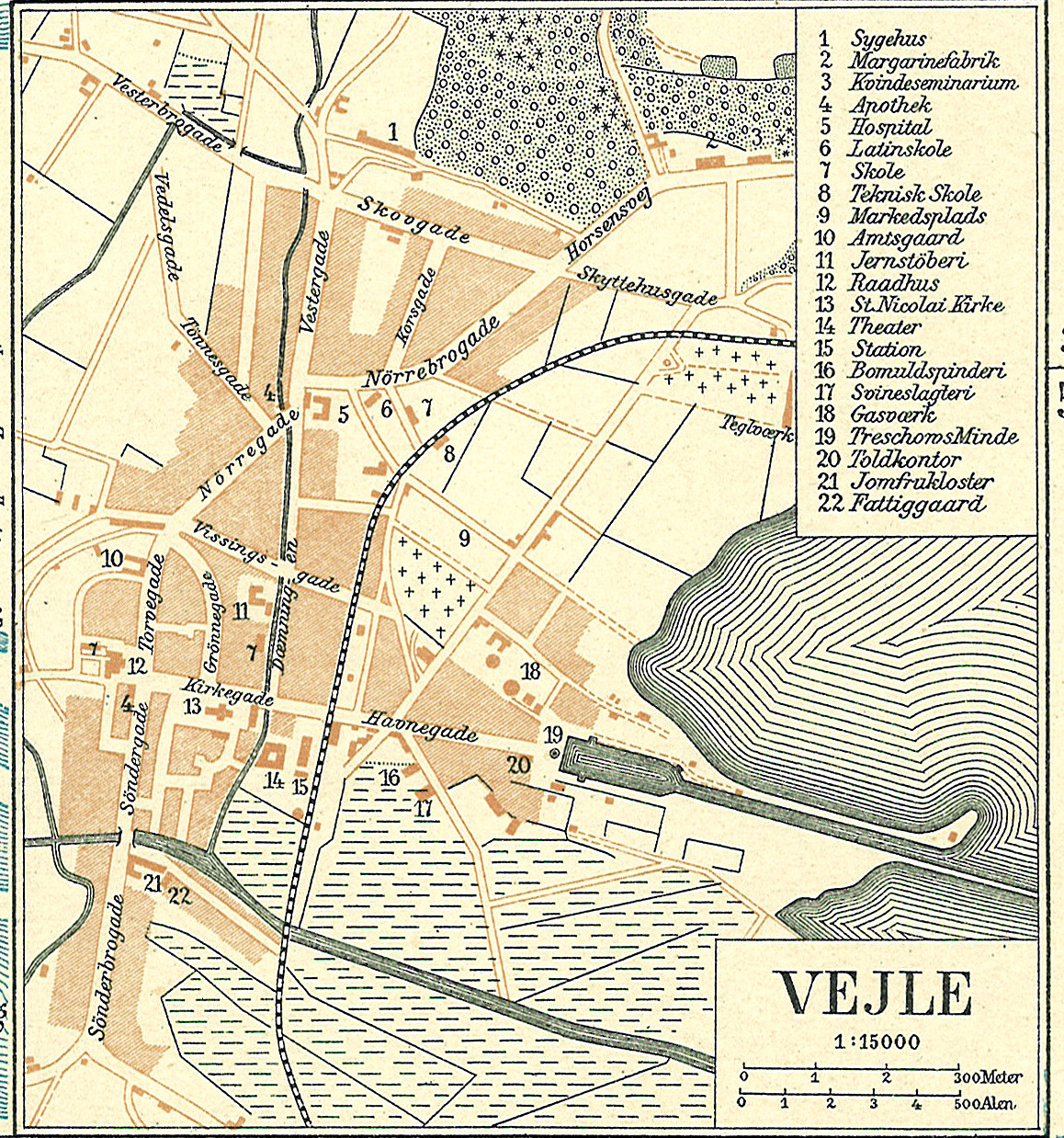
Map of Vejle, c. 1900.

Throughout the 19th century, the town benefited from improvements such as a new harbour on the fjord, a railway station, and modern utilities. From the mid-19th century into the 20th century, Vejle developed from a provincial market town into a busy industrial centre, eventually becoming known as the "Manchester of Denmark" for its many cotton mills.

== Geography ==
=== Topography ===
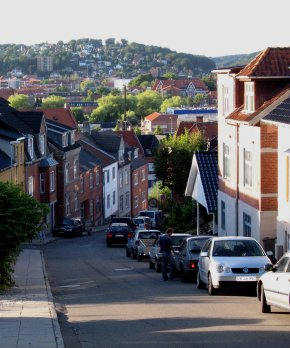
View of the hills of Vejle from Kiddesvej

Downtown Vejle was built on an island of glacial till in Vejle River remaining from a hill formed during the last ice age.

In a country where the highest natural elevation is only about 170 m (558 ft) above sea level, Vejle is known for the forested hills that rise to the north and south of the town and fjord.

The valleys of the two rivers that converge at Vejle are both unique in Denmark: Vejle River Valley (Vejle Ådal) is the longest tunnel valley in Denmark, and the Grejs Valley (Grejsdalen) is the largest ravine in Denmark.

Both empty into Vejle Fjord, which connects Vejle by water through the Little Belt strait to the Baltic Sea, and through the Kattegat and Skagerrak straits to the Atlantic Ocean.

=== Cityscape ===
Development of new architecture, art and alternative town spaces throughout the 1990s has made the city an attraction. Vejle was the first city in Denmark, which had its own official architecture policy to set high standards for the urban development. The fjord is also the site of the modern wave-shaped apartment complex known as The Wave (Bølgen).

=== Neighbourhoods ===
Many of Vejle's neighbourhoods began as separate towns or villages that merged with the city as it grew. Søndermarken, Nørremarken, and Grejsdalen, however, were all founded as extensions of the city onto the surrounding hillsides.

Vejle's neighbourhoods include:

- Vejle centre.
- Bredballe – east of the motorway and north of Vejle Fjord; considered an affluent neighbourhood.
- Grejsdalen – northernmost part of the city, located in the long, narrow valley of the same name.
- Mølholm – southeast of the centre.
- Nørremarken – east of Grejsdalen, west of the motorway, includes Northern Woods (Nørreskoven) and Vejle Stadium.
- Uhrhøj – west of Grejsdalen, north of Trædballe.
- Vinding – southeast, next to Mølholm.
- Skibet – westernmost part of the city.
- Søndermarken – to the southwest, located on land belonging to the former Petersholm manor, and includes Løget by.
- Trædballe – north-west corner of centre.
- Rosborg – New development south of Trædballe and east of Skibet.

== Economy ==
Vejle is the cultural and economic centre of Vejle Municipality and, as part of the unofficial Triangle Area (Trekantområde), is rich in industry, business, and the service sector. Historically speaking, industry has been very important for the city's development, while today more weight is placed on business and service, as well as high-tech firms.

=== Industry ===
During the Industrial Revolution, Vejle was known as the "Manchester of Denmark" due to its extensive textile mills. The local rivers provided water power to mills, including the extensive facilities of De Danske Bomuldsspinderier (The Danish Cotton Mills). In the first half of the 20th century, Vejle was something of a behemoth within the Danish textile industry, with some 25% of the city's workers employed in the industry. Despite the decline in the industry in Denmark, the last cotton mill in Vejle remained open until 1993. Today, many of the old mill buildings are used for art studios, office space, and, more recently, apartments.

In 1975 United Trailer Factories was founded by brothers Niels and Jens Buhl. The company, now known as ‘Variant’ like its products, has grown in strength to become one of the biggest quality trailer manufacturers in Europe.

Later on, newer industries took root in Vejle. The city is home to one of the largest chewing gum factories in the world, producing Stimorol brand chewing gum.

The Tulip slaughterhouses were also an important employer in the city. Today, Tulip has closed its factory at the harbour, but still maintains production in northern Vejle.

Today, Vejle's economy is shifting out of the industrial sector and into the high-tech sector, with a number of software companies operating out of the city.

=== Shopping ===
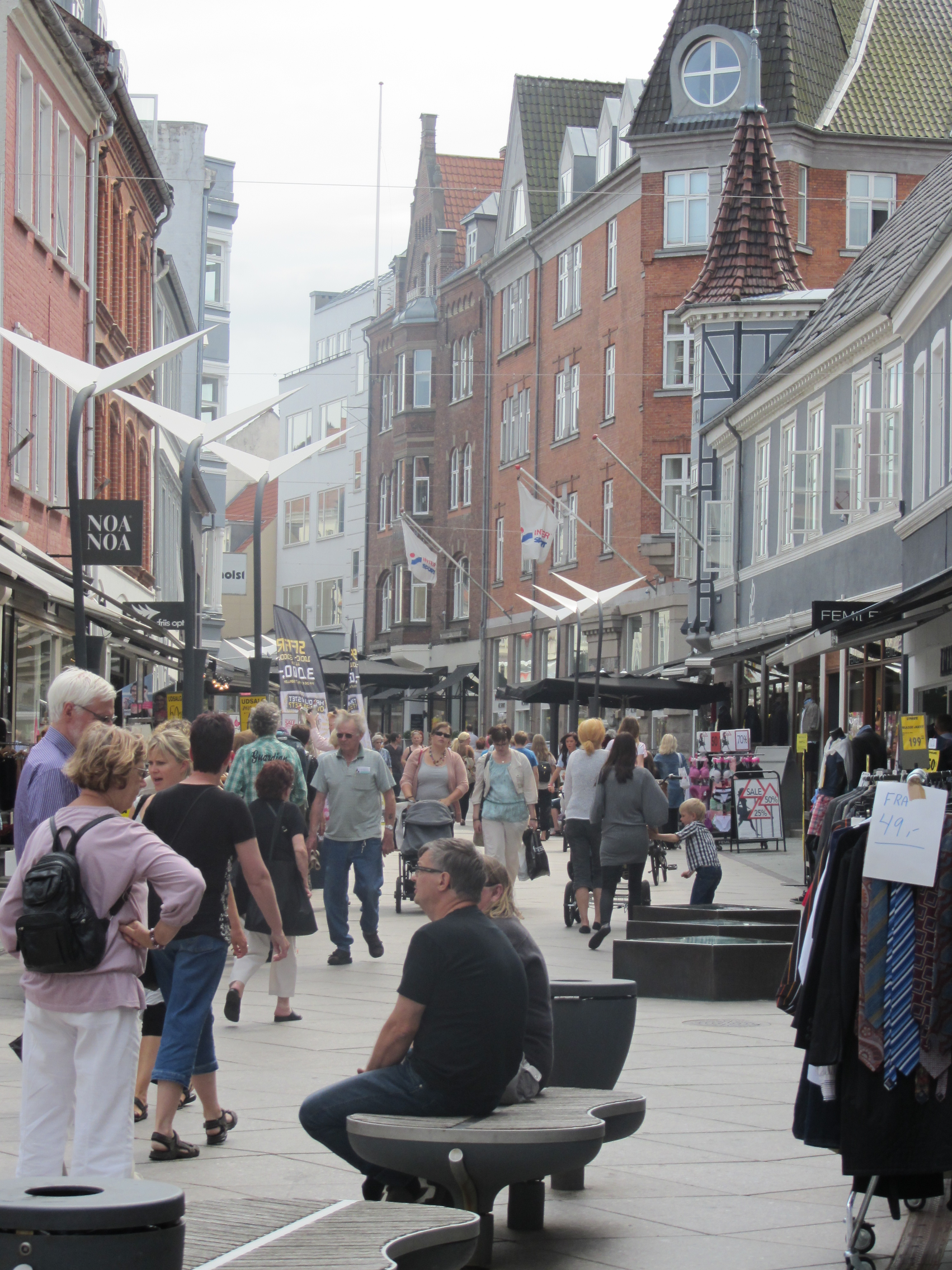
Vejle's pedestrian street

Vejle is a regional retail center featuring a variety of chain and specialty shops, primarily located along the city's central pedestrian street. The municipality has undertaken several public works projects to improve the urban landscape, including the expansion of the pedestrian zone, the integration of new public art and architecture, and the daylighting of the Grejs River, which previously flowed through a culvert beneath downtown.

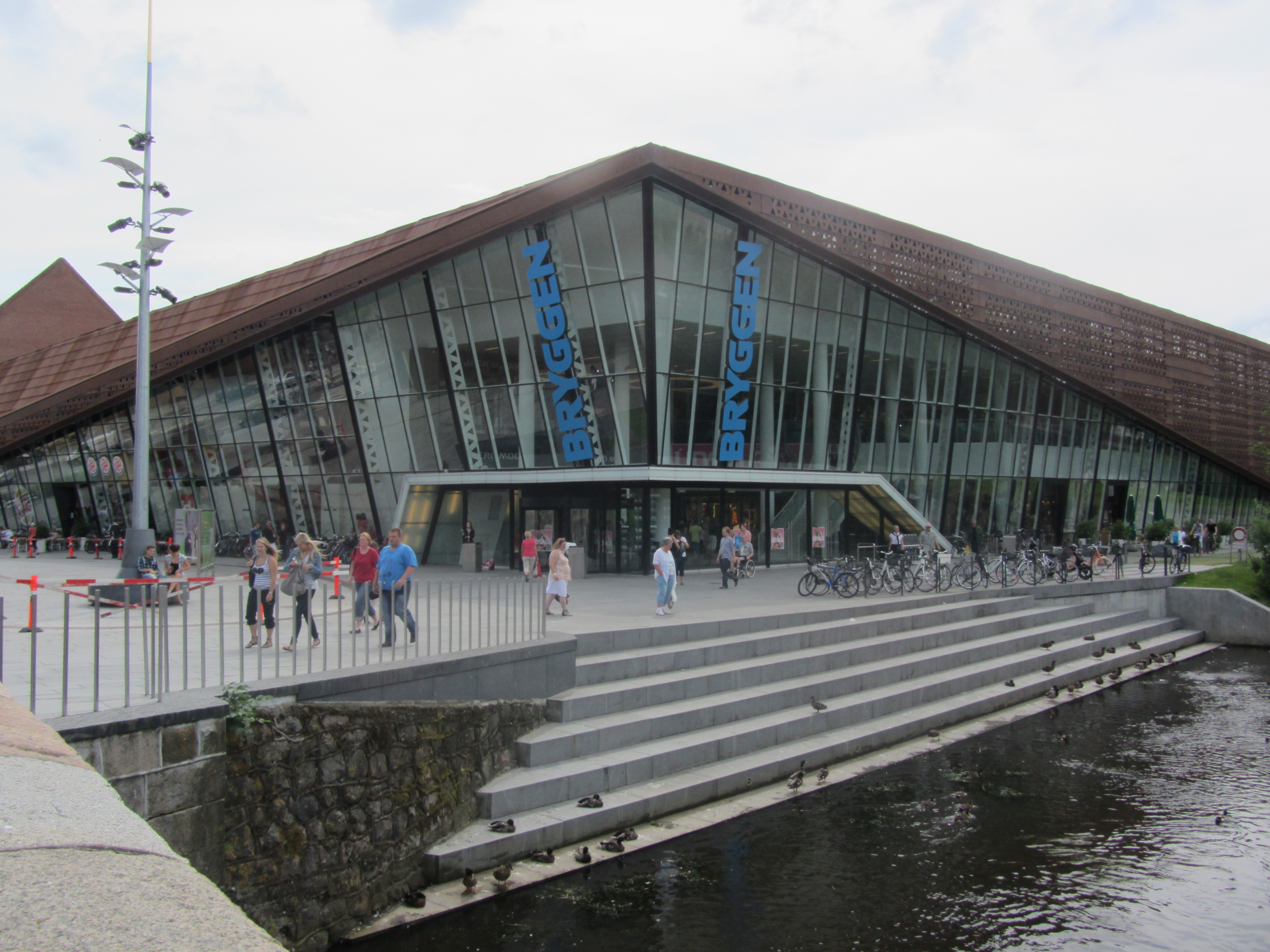
The Bryggen shopping centre

In addition to the shopping experiences in the city, Vejle also has its own shopping centre, the Bryggen shopping centre, located in the center of the city. It contains 38 stores and two restaurants and lies within the pedestrian street.

Street food concepts can also be experienced at the Paladspassagen Social Dining at the former Mary's Shoppingcenter.

== Government and politics ==
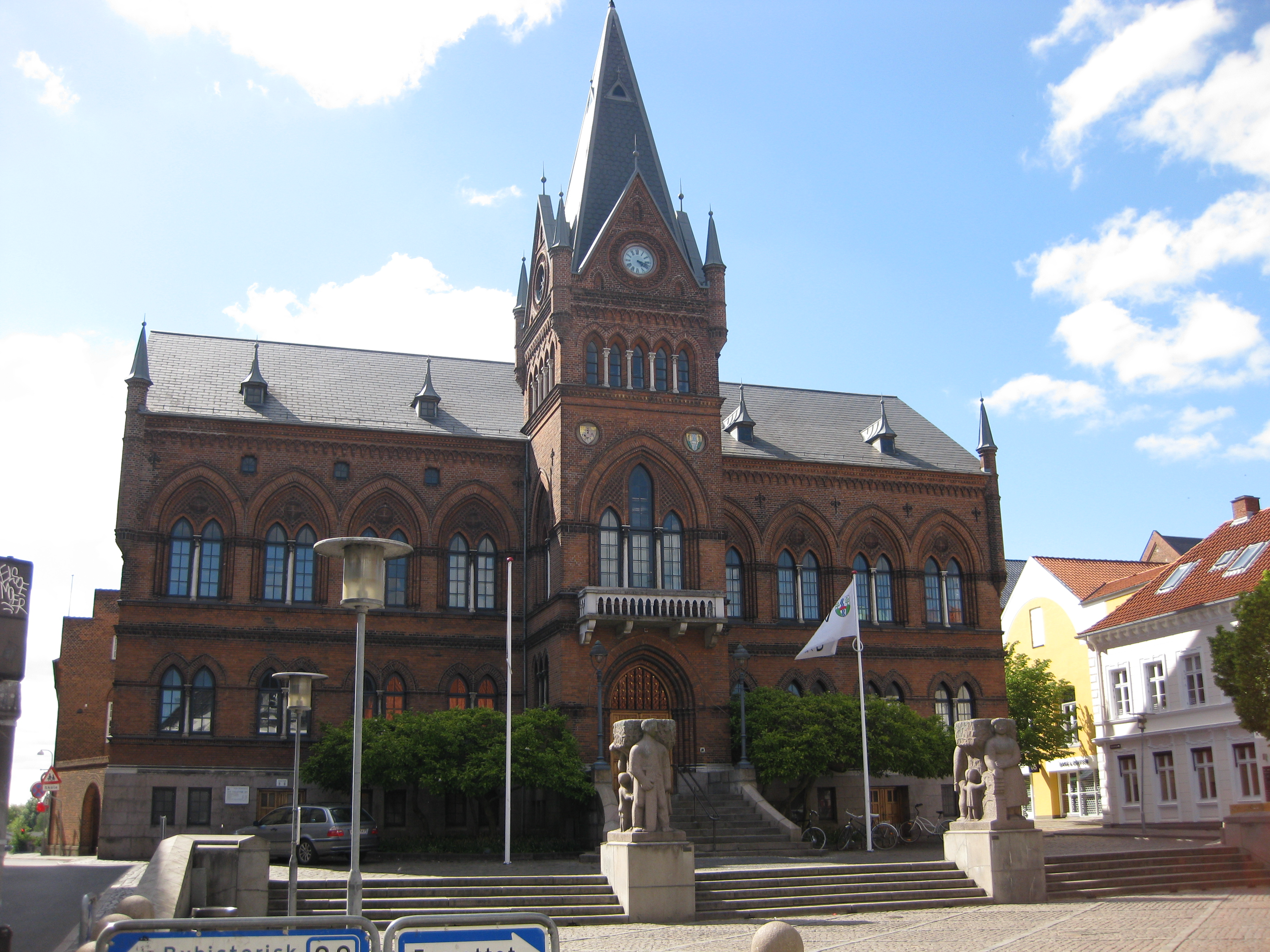
Vejle City Hall

Vejle is located in and is the seat of Vejle Municipality which in its current configuration was formed under the Municipal Reform of 2007. Vejle's municipal council consists of 31 members, elected every four years.

Ever since Social Democrat Christian Jacobsen became Vejle's first elected mayor in 1919, the town has been a stronghold for the Social Democrats and trade unions. The longest serving Social Democratic mayor was Willy Sørensen, a union leader who joined the city council in 1937 and held the mayor's post for 31 years, from 1946 until his death in 1978.

In 1993, the Social Democratic dynasty was broken, when a candidate from a coalition of opposition parties, Flemming Christiansen, became mayor. In 2009, the Social Democrats were out of power again when Liberal candidate Arne Sigtenbjerggaard won the elections.

Several natives of Vejle have also made a career in national politics, including former Prime Minister Lars Løkke Rasmussen (Liberal), the former Minister of the Treasury Troels Lund Poulsen (Liberal), former Minister of Health Torben Lund (Social Democrat), and former Minister of Transportation Flemming Hansen (Conservative).

== Transportation and infrastructure ==
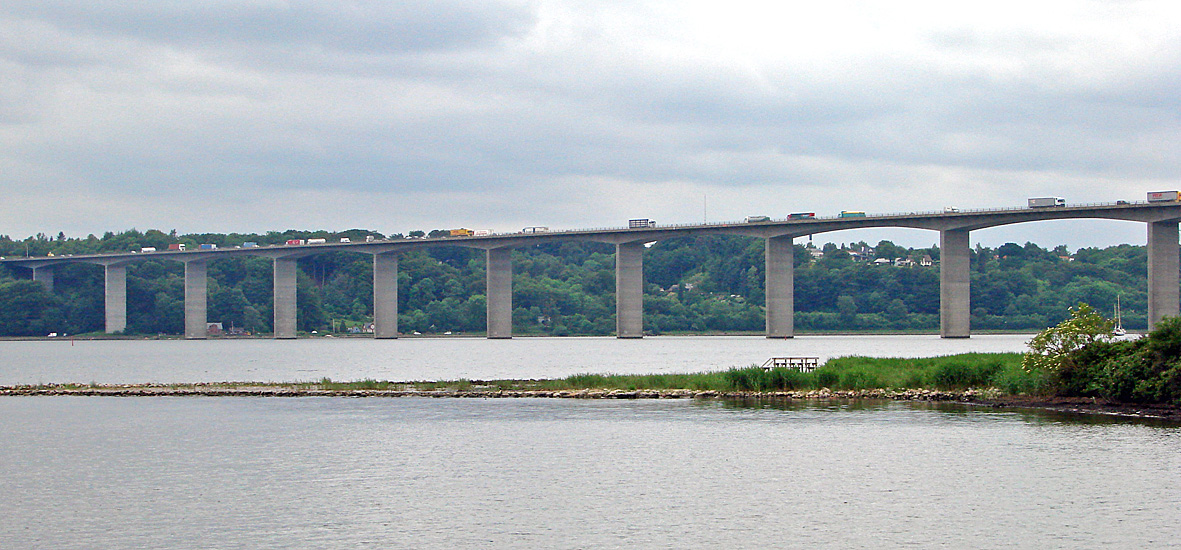
Vejle Fjord Bridge

Historically speaking, Vejle's development has been guided by the city's central location in the country and its location on Vejle Fjord. Vejle's pedestrian street today runs along the same course as some of the earliest paths through town – glass panels set into Torvegade allow pedestrians to see the historical market road a few meters under the current street surface.

The European route E45 motorway passes close to downtown Vejle on the Vejle Fjord Bridge. Vejle is also known for motorway exit 59, also called Exxit 59, where few fast food chains such as KFC, McDonald's Enzo & C are located here, and the motorway exit is also known for carpooling. The Exit 59 is also known to be called Gateaway E45, because of its huge cargo- and transportation center, called Denmarks Transport Center, DTC.

Vejle is also located on Primary Route 28, and the Mid-Jutland Highway (Midjyske Motorvej, Primary Route 18) from Herning.

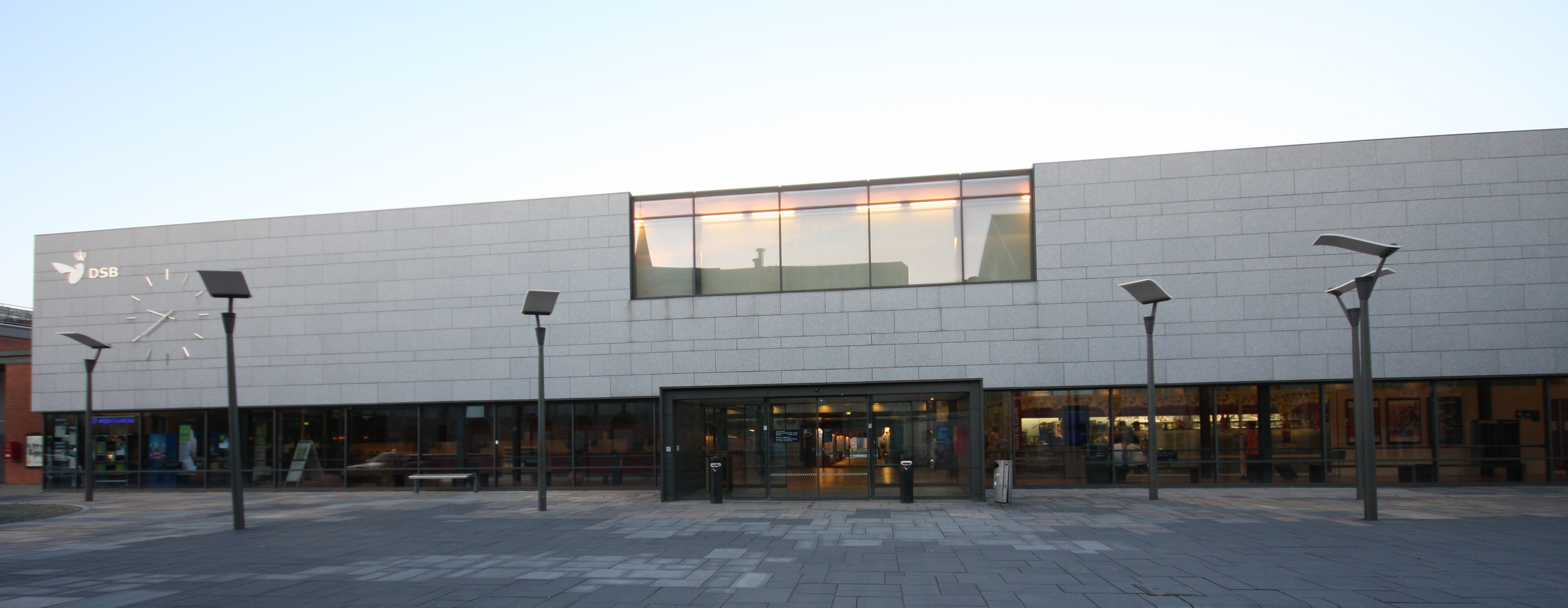
Vejle railway station

(Danish: Vejle Station) is the principal transport hub for public transport in Vejle, which provides nine city bus lines to various neighbourhoods, as well as national and international coach and train services.

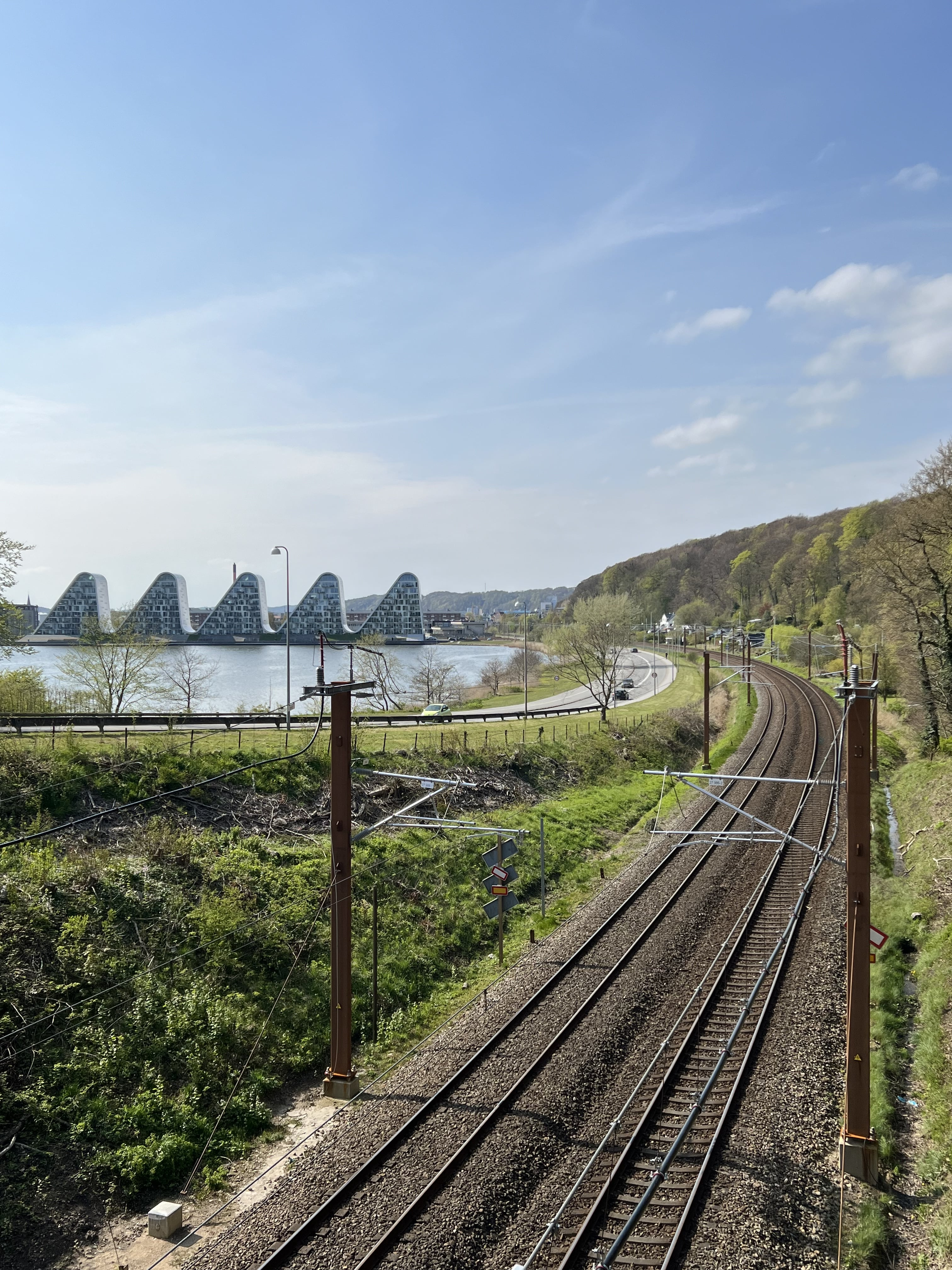
East Jutland railway line towards Vejle

Vejle railway station first opened in 1868, and is today a central station in the Danish train network.

Vejle railway station is also a hub for merging two railway lines. The East Jutland railway, from Aarhus to Vejle, and The Central Jutland railway, from Struer to Vejle . From Vejle going south or east, the next main train station, is Fredericia station. Here the trains can depart to either Copenhagen through Odense station, to Esbjerg through Kolding railway station, or to Hamburg in Germany, also through Kolding railway station.

However, the station is currently the subject of political debate, due to a desire on the part of some politicians to reduce train travel time between Odense and Århus to one hour. This may mean that a second bridge will be built over Vejle Fjord, bypassing Vejle Station.

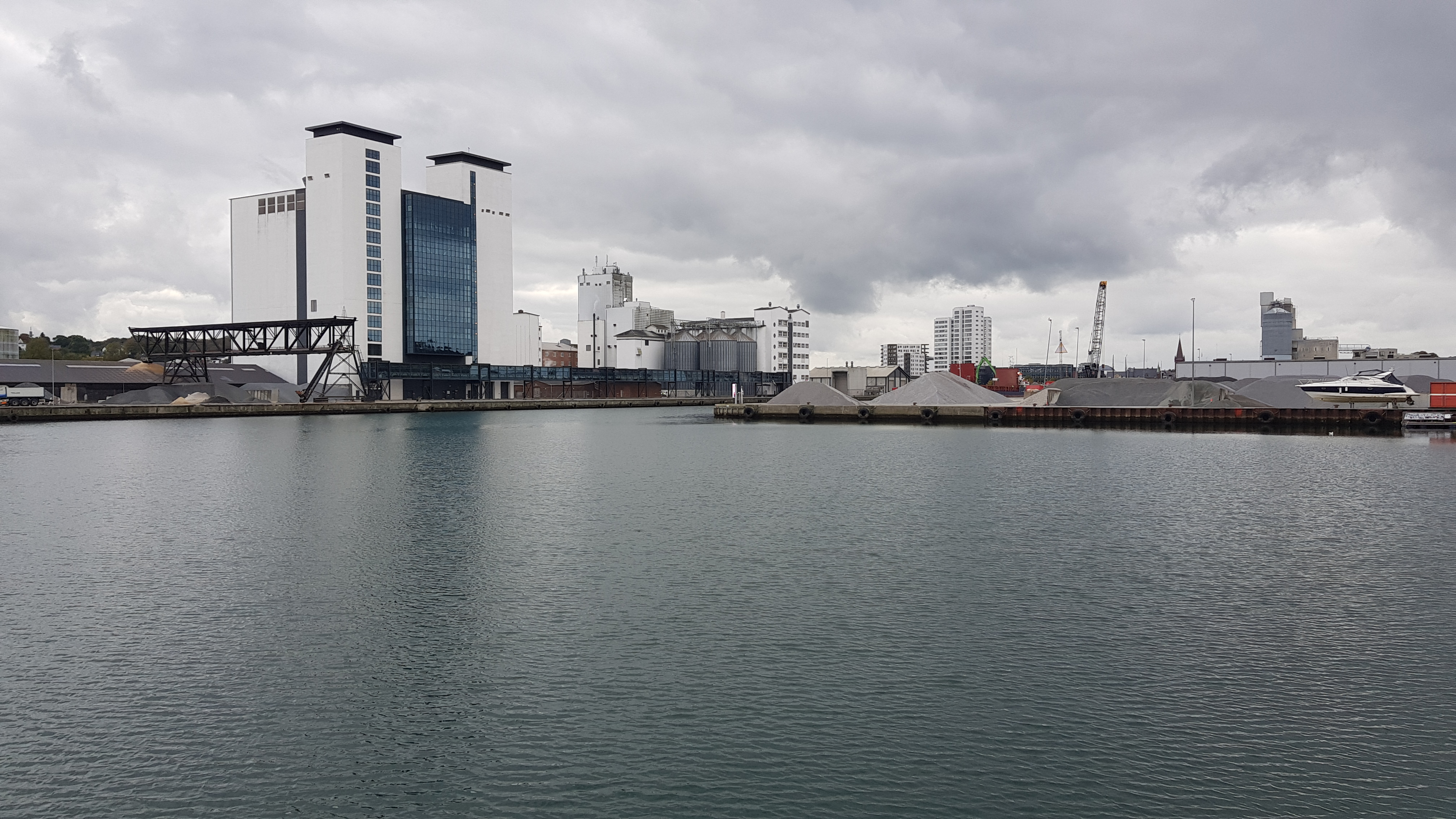
The Port of Vejle in 2020

The Port of Vejle, in its current location, was inaugurated in 1827. In the years following World War II, it grew to become the second largest port in Denmark after the Port of Copenhagen. Up until 1932, the steamboats Hvidbjerg (named after a local seaside community) and Jeppe Jensen (named after the harbour's founder) plied the waters between Vejle Harbour and Munkebjerg, Tirsbæk, Ulbækhus, and Fakkegrav. The harbour is currently profitable, although there are plans to convert the northern section of the harbour into a park and residential area, which would reconnect the town with the fjord.

Vejle Municipality is part-owner of Denmark's second-largest airport, Billund Airport, located near the Lego Group's headquarters some 30 kilometres (19 miles) from the centre of Vejle. Airport buses run regularly to Billund Airport from Vejle Transit Centre.

== Environment ==
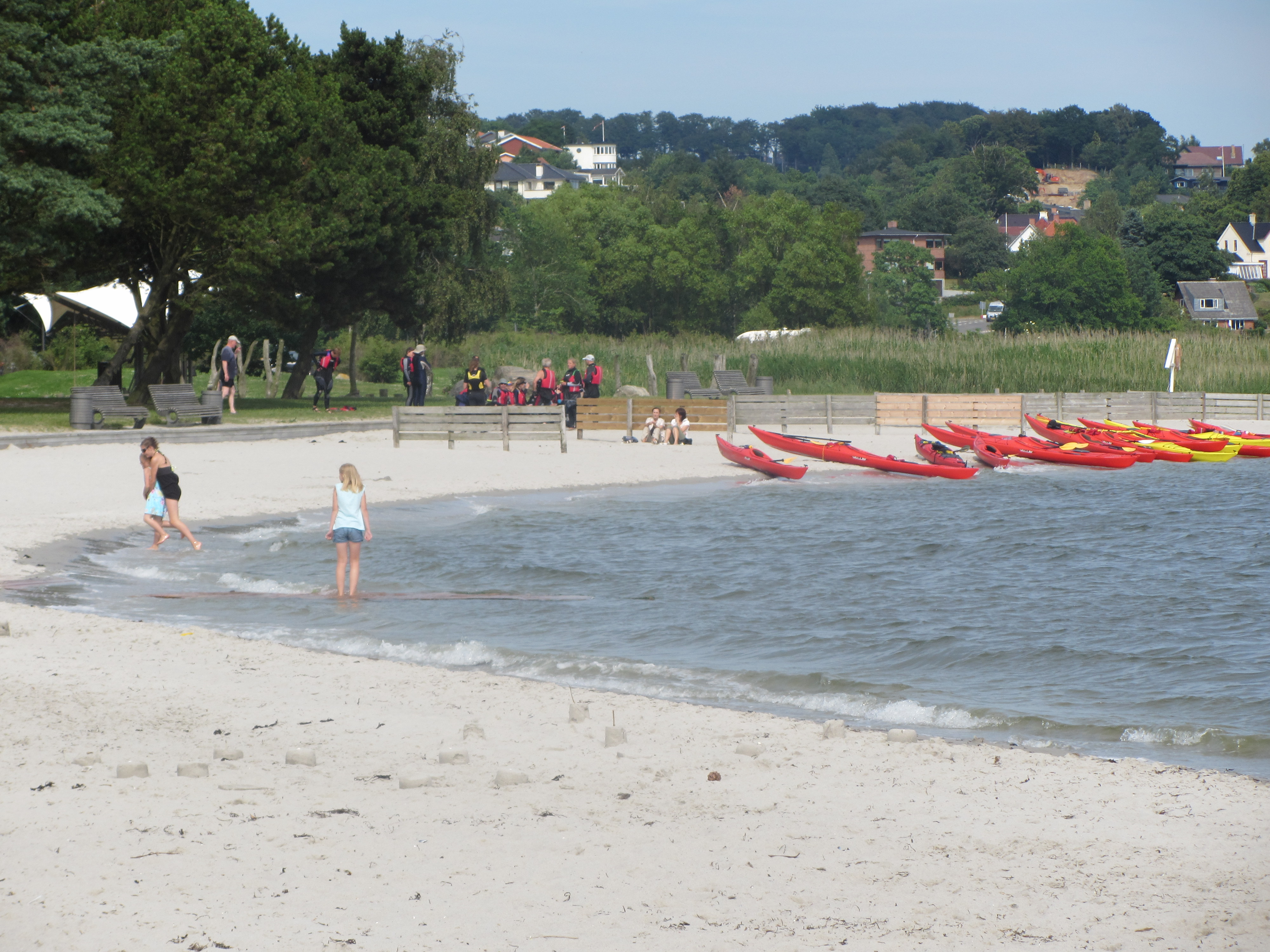
Albuen Beach

A central point of Vejle's environmental policy since 1985 has been the sorting of garbage into non-compostable and compostable waste, which is then composted in the city dump. To this end, residents must place all household trash into either black or green bags.

Vejle Municipality has also begun a range of nature restoration projects. The most ambitious of these has been the restoration of the Kongens Kær wetlands around the Vejle River just outside the city limits. The city has also undertaken a project to establish two new public beaches for swimming, Albuen and Tirsbæk Strand.

== Education ==
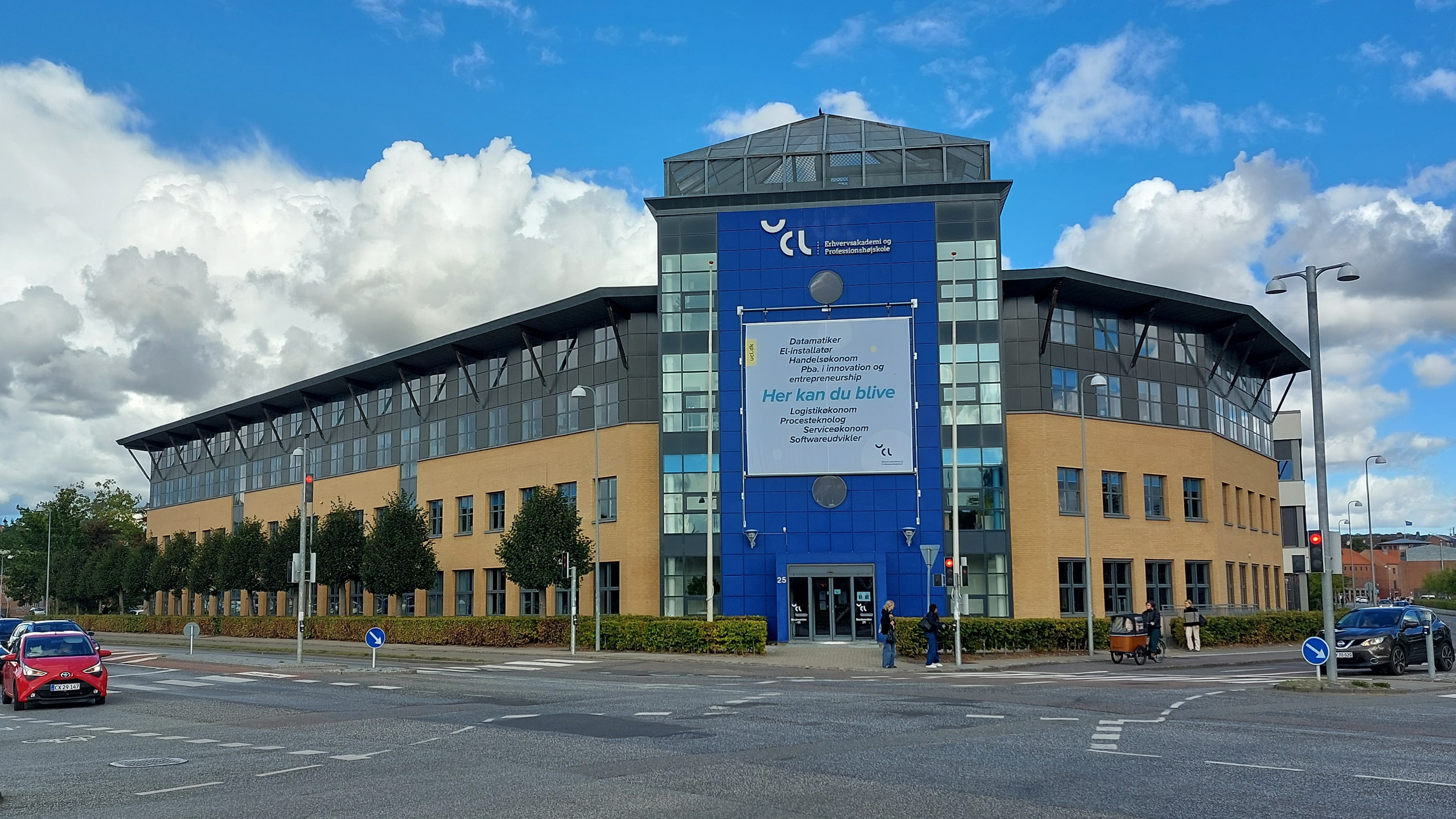
UCL University College

Vejle is home to the headquarters of University College Lillebælt, which is a merger of several educational institutions in East Jutland and Funen.

As Vejle is home to many international industrial companies and is also known to be called "the Silicon Valley of Denmark" due to a lot IT companies located in Vejle. The government, after a lot of negotiations back in 2021, came to an agreement in 2024 with Vejle Municipality, University of Southern Denmark that Vejle from 2026 will become a university city. The University of Southern Denmark, SDU, will establish a campus housing the faculty of IT and software. The Lego Group will also be one of among many companies to enter as cooperation partners with SDU, for the purpose of gaining a strong research and educational environment in Vejle.

It is expected that in 2026 the faculty of IT and software in Vejle, will house 400 students, and by 2032 more than 1200 students and 90 academic employees.

Adult and professional education is available in Vejle through the Region of Southern Denmark, the Folkeuniversitet (Adult Education Centre), the Vejle Idrætshøjskole (Athletics Professional College), and Skolen for Gastronomi, Musik & Design (School for Gastronomy, Music, and Design).

On the secondary education level, Vejle offers several options: Vejle Handelsskole (Vejle Business School) offers business and professional programs; Vejle Tekniske Gymnasium (Vejle Technical School) offers vocational and technical education; and Rødkilde Gymnasium (on the fjord) and Rosborg Gymnasium offer academic programs with concentrations in language and science.

On the primary level, Vejle has 11 regular primary schools (folkeskoler), 2 independent schools (friskoler), and 5 private schools (privatskoler) – one secular, one Protestant, one Catholic, one Islamic and one Waldorf-Steiner method school – as well as 2 schools for special needs students. Unique to Vejle is a special program for athletically talented students starting in late primary school and continuing through Vejle Handelsskole.

== Sports ==
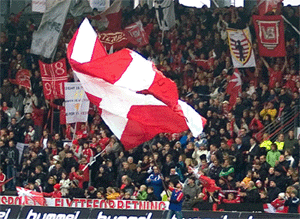
Crowd at a Vejle Boldklub game at Vejle Stadium

The city's traditional football club, Vejle Boldklub (Vejle Football Club), has won the Danish Superliga Championships five times and the Danish Cup six times. Vejle Boldklub has trained many talented football players, among others one of Danish football history's few international stars: Allan Simonsen, who in 1977 became the first Danish player to win the European Footballer of the Year award. Today, Vejle Boldklub is in a ramping-up period, with the goal of bringing the club back to the top of Danish football. To this end, new Vejle Stadium was opened in spring 2008.

Vejle's largest indoor sports facilities are mostly housed in the DGI-Huset recreational centre in western Vejle. In the past, the facility has housed several high-profile events, including the European Women's Handball Championship and the Danish Open in badminton.

Former Swiss cyclist Tony Rominger was born in Vejle, and cyclist Bjarne Riis has a house in Vejle. Denmark's answer to the Tour de France, Danmark Rundt, includes a stretch through Vejle which is known as the hardest stage in the race, including a loop that requires the riders to climb the hillsides of Vejle several times. The race's winner is usually determined in the Vejle stage. Stage 3 of the 2022 Tour de France started in Vejle.

== Arts and attractions ==
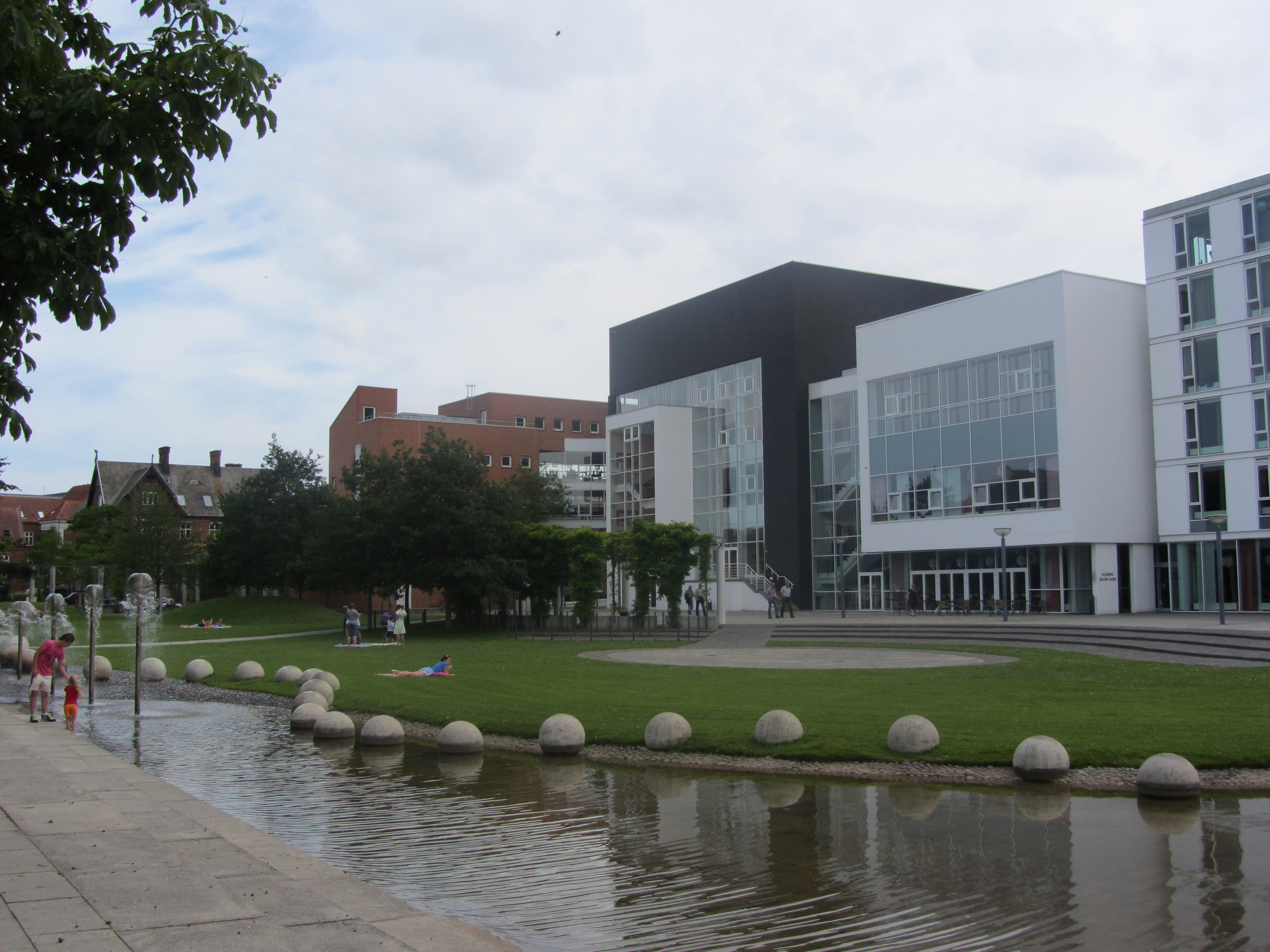
Vejle Music Hall (Vejle Musikteater)

In the arts, the most well-known personality from Vejle is composer Jacob Gade, who wrote the Tango Jalousie. Other artists include priest and historial Anders Sørensen Vedel, poet Inger Christensen, artist Albert Bertelsen, and actress Bodil Jørgensen.

In the early and mid-20th century, Vejle had several popular cultural destinations such as Trædballehus in the western part of town and the Munkebjerg Casino south of the fjord.

Trædballehus, an inn and music venue, which burned down in 1954, got its big breakthrough in the mid-1930s when it was featured on Danish National Radio in connection with the opening of the old Little Belt Bridge. 1933 Hotel Munkebjerg boasted Europe's longest wooden escalator, carrying guests from the fjord-side beach up to the hilltop casino. Munkebjerg still exists as a hotel, casino and conference centre.

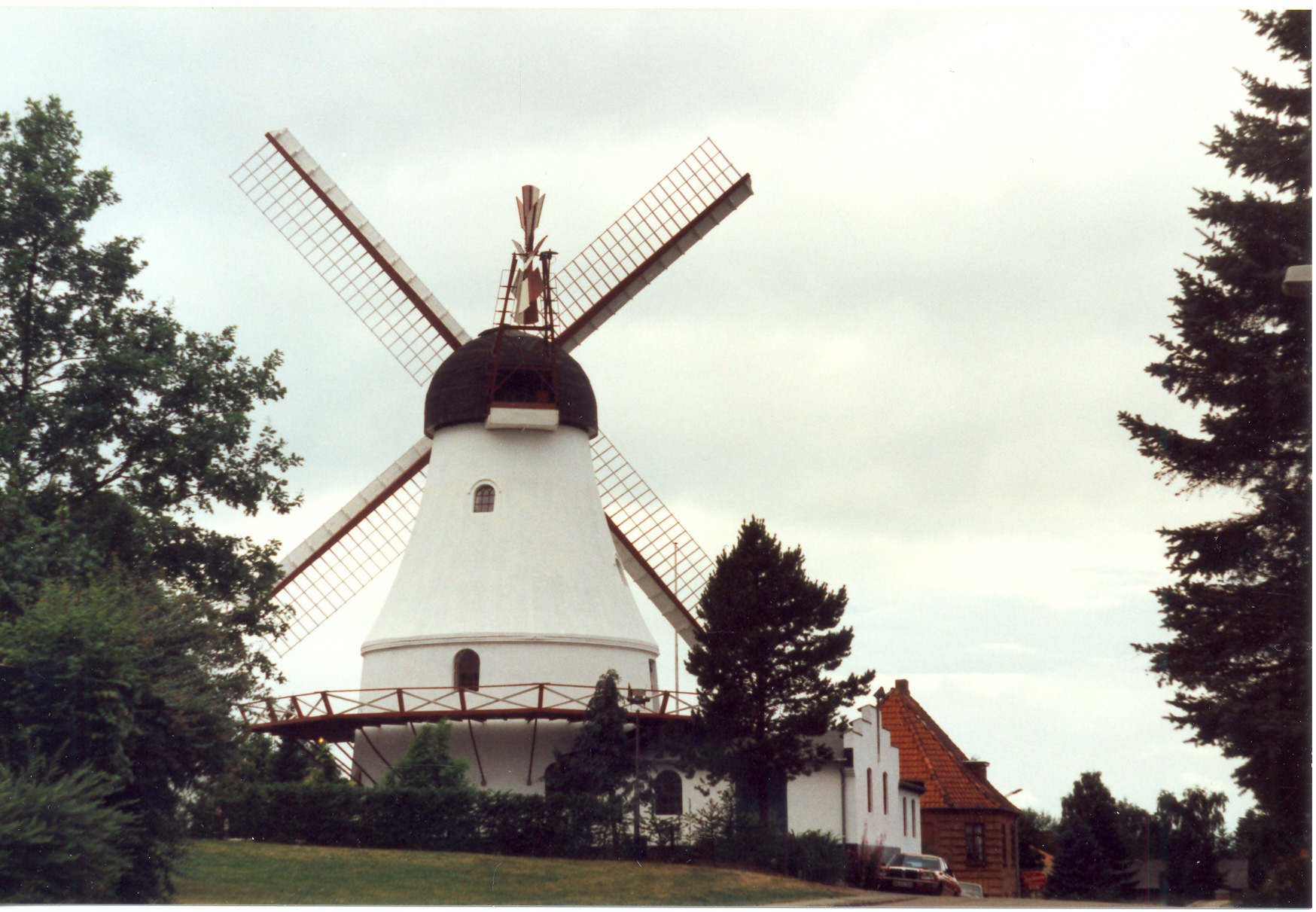
Vejle's windmill

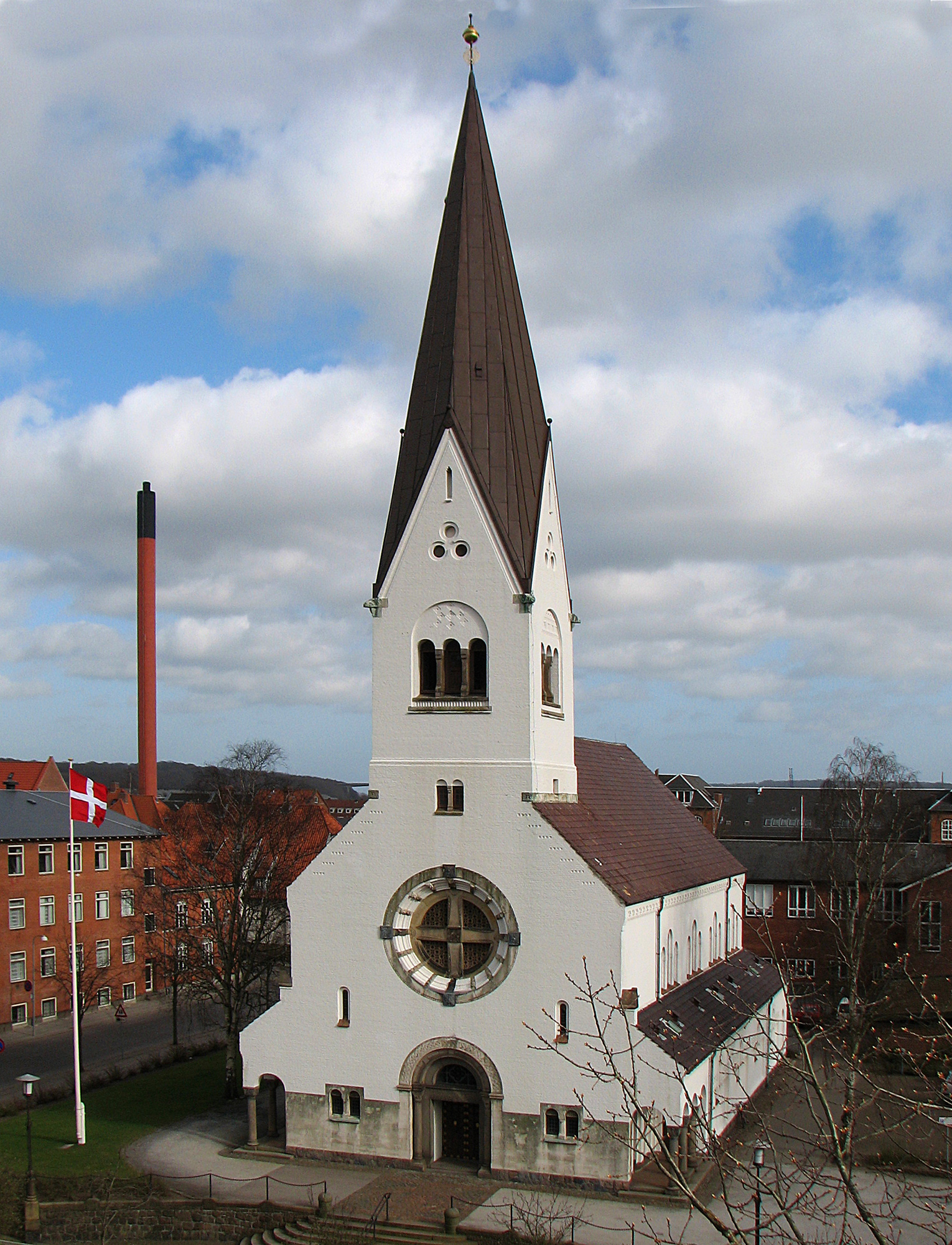
Our Saviour's Church (Vor Frelsers Kirke)

Vejle Mill, located on top of the cliff at Søndermarken, is a well-known landmark because of its visibility, and is often used as a symbol of the city.

The Old Jail House in Vejle, which is connected to the Town Hall, was rebuilt in 1984 and received a prize for beautification.

Vejle's oldest extant building, St. Nicolai Church, was built in the mid-13th century. On display in the church is the Haraldskær bog woman, a body from the Iron Age that was preserved with its skin intact in a local peat bog. Another feature of the church are 23 spherical indentations on the north transept – legend says these are imprints of the skulls of executed robbers from the woods that surround Vejle.

Among the city's cultural institutions is the renovated and expanded Vejle Museum of Art. The museum features the Wörzner collection with several COBRA works as well as works by Rembrandt. Today, Vejle Town Museum is located in the renovated Spinning Mill.

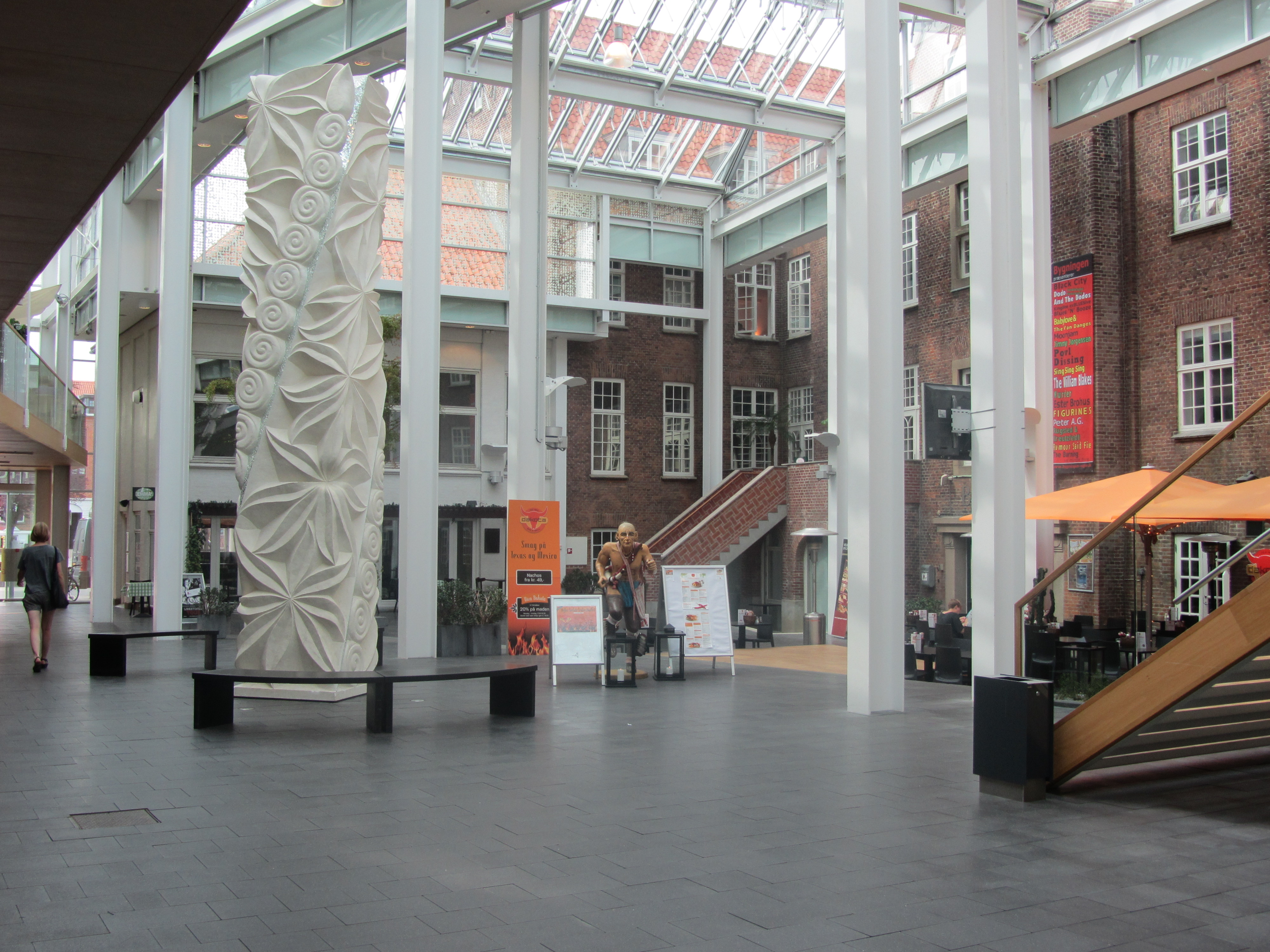
The former Mary's shopping centre

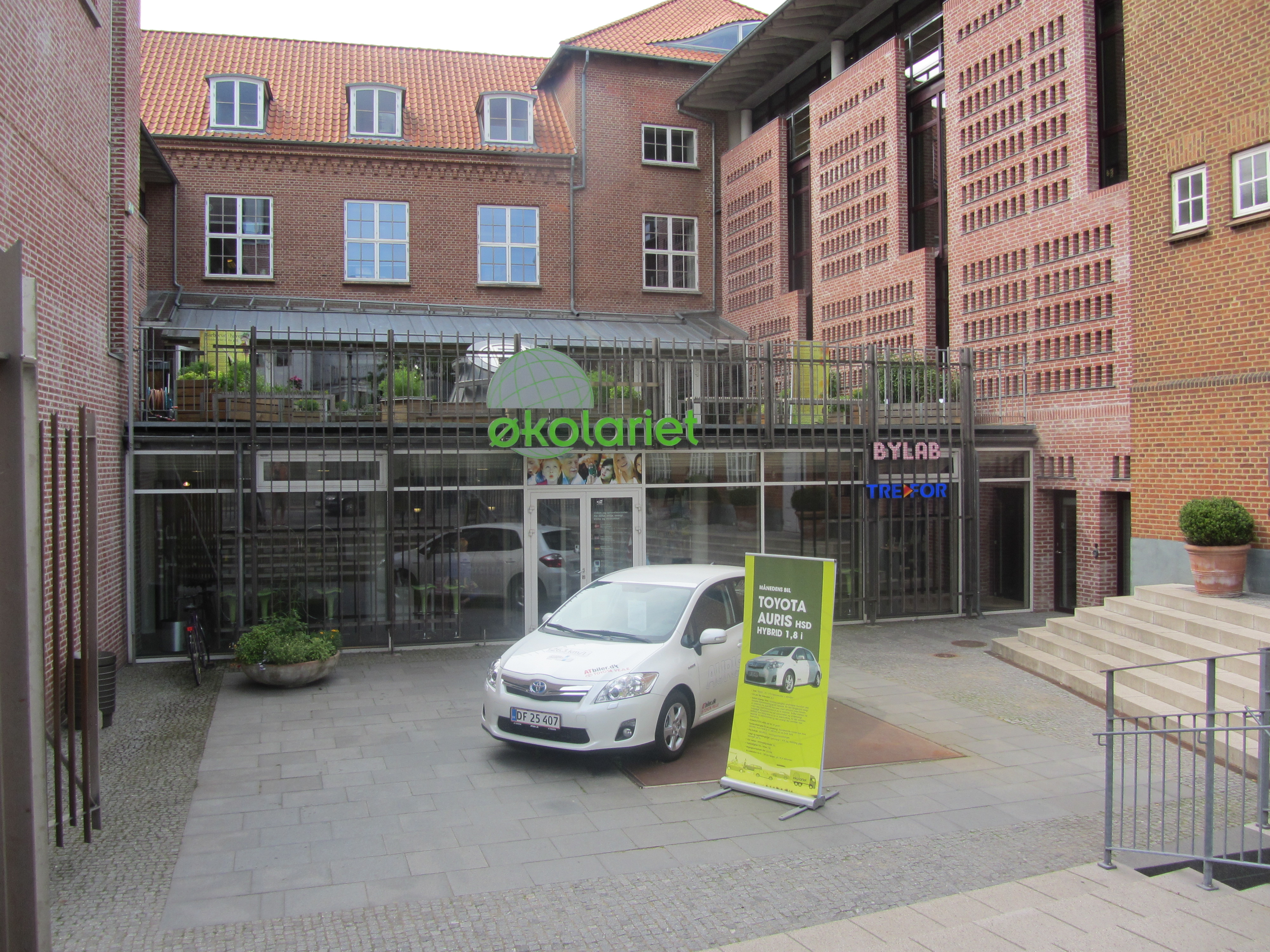
Økolariet ecology-focused educational centre

The Socialists' former stronghold in Vejle, The Building, is today placed under glass in what used to be the shopping center "Mary's", and houses restaurants, cafés and two venues for e.g. jazz concerts. Økolariet is a free edutainment center for both children and adults, focusing on technology, ecology, recycling, etc.

Vejle is situated close to several Jutland attractions such as the original Legoland and the Viking Age royal capital of Jelling. Jelling's archaeological artifacts are considered a UNESCO World Heritage Site, and include two 10th century rune stones and two burial mounds, as well as a new exhibition centre.

Another architectural landmark is Fjordenhus, located on Vejle Harbour. The building was designed by artist Olafur Eliasson and architect Sebastian Behmann with Studio Olafur Eliasson, and forms part of the master plan for Vejle Harbour.

== Notable people ==
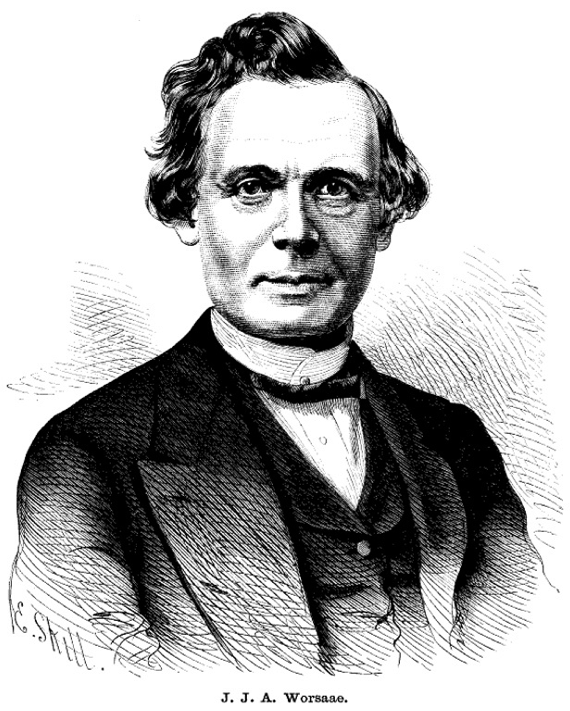
Jens Jacob Asmussen Worsaae, 1885

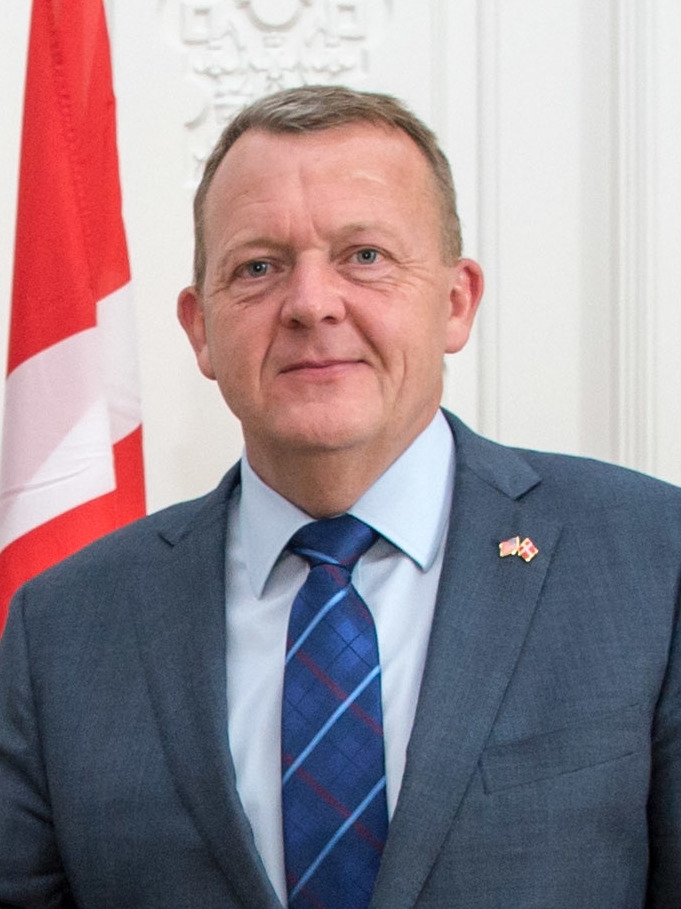
Lars Løkke Rasmussen, 2017

=== Public Service and public thinking ===
- Ludvig Munk (1537 in Vejle – 1602) a Junker at the royal court in 1561 and a Count
- Anders Sørensen Vedel (1542 in Vejle – 1616), priest and historian, translator of Gesta Danorum
- Johann Andreas Mühlensteth (1746 in Vejle – 1819) a pharmacist who experimented with hot air balloons
- Poul Martin Møller (1794 in Uldum near Vejle – 1838) a Danish academic, writer, and poet
- Jens Jacob Asmussen Worsaae (1821 in Vejle – 1885), archeologist and the 2nd director National Museum of Denmark
- Nicholas Bjerring (1831 in Vejle – 1900) the first Orthodox Christian priest to establish an Orthodox church and community in the northeastern United States
- Holger Petersen (1843 in Vejle – 1917) a Danish textile manufacturer and philanthropist.
- Lili Elbe (1882 in Vejle – 1931) transgender woman, early recipient of sex reassignment surgery
- Thorkil Kristensen (1899 in Fløjstrup near Vejle – 1989) politician, finance minister and futurist
- Niels Åge Nielsen (1913 in Vejle – 1986) professor of Nordic languages and leader in the Danish resistance movement
- Torben Lund (born 1950 in Vejle) retired politician, MEP 1999–2004
- Fritz Schur (born 1951 in Vejle) a Danish businessman with connections
- Lars-Henrik Schmidt (born 1953 in Vejle) a philosopher, developed Social Analytics
- Lene Hau (born 1959 in Vejle) a Danish physicist in Boston US
- Lars Løkke Rasmussen (born 1964 in Vejle) 25th Prime Minister of Denmark 2009/2011 and 2015/2019

=== The Arts ===
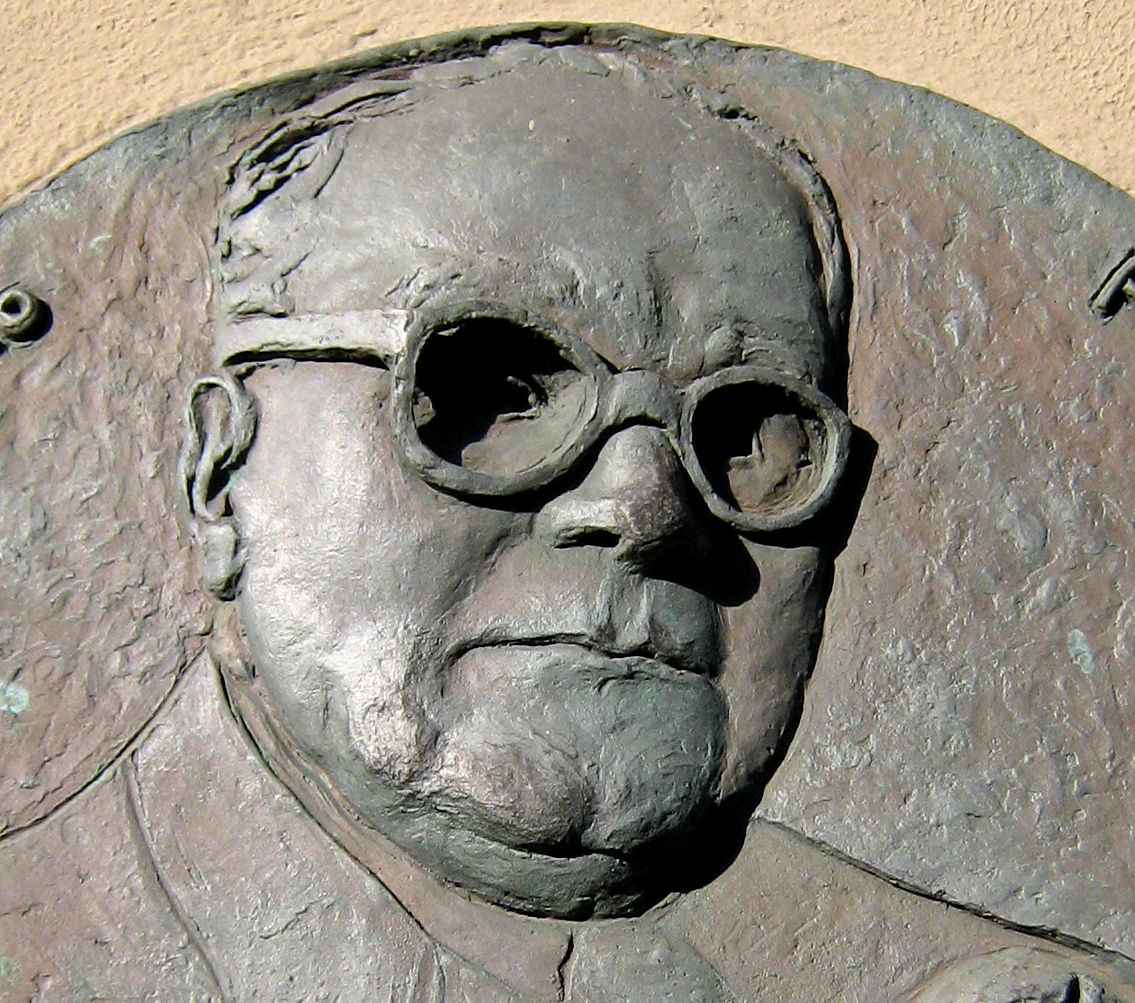
Jacob Gade, memorial plate

- Sophus Juncker-Jensen (1859 in Vejle – 1940) an early Danish photographer
- Harald Kidde (1878 in Vejle– 1918) a Danish writer, wrote the novel Helten (The Hero)
- Jacob Gade (1879 in Vejle – 1963) violinist and composer of Jalousie
- Lili Elbe (1882 in Vejle – 1931) Painter.
- Lau Lauritzen Jr. (1910 in Vejle – 1977) a Danish actor, screenwriter and film director
- Lilly Brændgaard (1918 in Vejle – 2009) a fashion designer, opened a studio in Vejle in 1947
- Albert Bertelsen (1921 in Vejle – 2019) a Danish autodidact painter and graphic artist
- Inger Christensen (1935 in Vejle – 2009) a poetic experimentalist, novelist, essayist and editor
- Kirsten Dehlholm (born 1945 in Vejle) a Danish artist and artistic theatre director
- Bodil Jørgensen (born 1961 in Vejle) a Danish film actress
- Nicolai Kielstrup (born 1991 in Vejle) a Danish singer
- Lilian Weber Hansen (1911–1987), opera singer

=== Sport ===
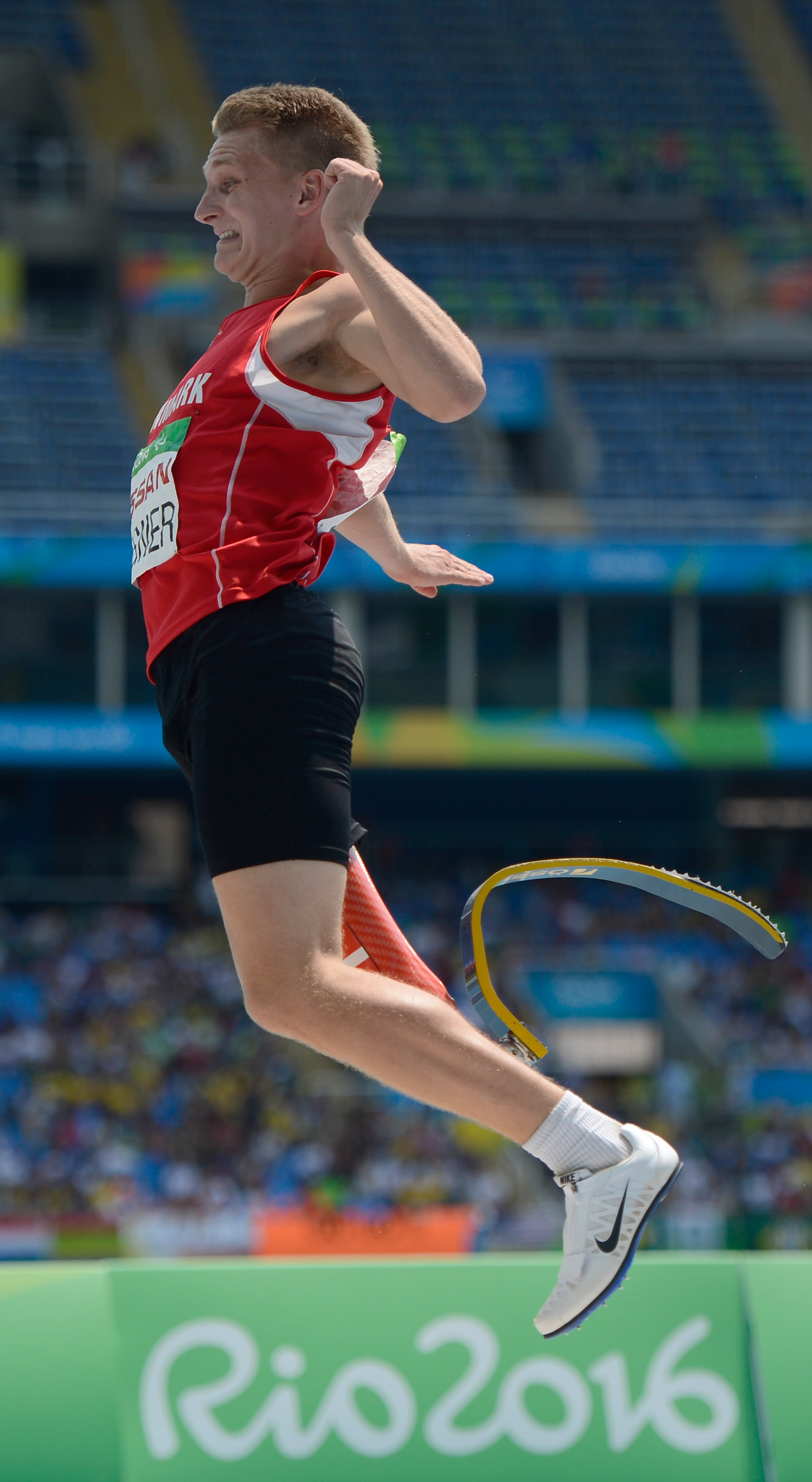
Daniel Wagner Jørgensen, 2016

- Bent Sørensen (1926 in Vejle – 2011) a footballer for Vejle Boldklub, 157 goals in 200 matches
- Poul Mejer (1931 in Vejle – 2000) a footballer for Vejle Boldklub, 307 club caps
- Johnny Hansen (born 1943 in Vejle) a former footballer, 433 club caps and 45 for Denmark
- Ulrik le Fevre (born 1946 in Vejle) former footballer, over 400 club caps and 37 for Denmark
- Allan Simonsen (born 1952 in Vejle) a former footballer and manager, 500 club caps and 55 for Denmark
- Ole Mortensen (born 1958 in Vejle) a Danish first-class cricketer
- John Sivebæk (born 1961 in Vejle) a former footballer, over 600 club caps, 300 for Vejle Boldklub and 87 for Denmark
- Tony Rominger (born 1961 in Vejle) a Swiss former professional road racing cyclist
- Brian Steen Nielsen (born 1968 in Vejle) footballer, 440 club caps and 66 matches for Denmark
- Jacob Laursen (born 1971 in Vejle) retired footballer, 439 club caps and 25 for Denmark
- Todi Jónsson (born 1972 in Vejle) a retired Faroese footballer, 338 club caps and 45 for the Faroes
- Thomas Gravesen (born 1976 in Vejle) a former footballer, 314 club caps and 66 for Denmark
- Jacob Barsøe (born 1988 in Vejle) rower, bronze and silver medallist at the 2012 and 2016 Summer Olympics
- Peter Lang (born 1989 in Vejle) a sailor, team bronze medallist at the 2012 Summer Olympics
- Daniel Jørgensen (born 1993 in Vejle) a Danish Paralympic sportsman and Olympic medallist
- Nicolai Reedtz (born 1995 in Vejle), a Danish successful Counter-Strike esports player
- Mikkel Grundtvig (born 2002 in Veijle), a Danish racing driver
- Frederik Vesti (born 2002 in Veijle), Danish racing driver current Formula 1 reserve driver for Mercedes-AMG Petronas

== Twin towns – sister cities ==
Vejle is twinned with:

- Borås, Sweden
- Jelgava, Latvia
- Mikkeli, Finland
- Molde, Norway
- Schleswig, Germany

Vejle also cooperates with:

- Jablanica, Bosnia and Herzegovina
- Mostar, Bosnia and Herzegovina
- Nantong, China
- Pervomaisk, Ukraine

== Notes ==
Also referenced

- Asbjørn Hellum. "History of Vejle ". Vejle Byhistoriske Arkiv & Stadsarkiv. Retrieved 31 March 2005. (In English)
- C.M.Hogan, History of Sct. Nicolai Kirche, Vejle, Denmark, Lumina Technologies, Santa Rosa Ca. 23 July 2006 (in English)
