= Orla Mølgaard-Nielsen =

Danish architect and furniture designer

Orla Mølgaard-Nielsen (12 September 1907 – 21 October 1993) was a Danish architect and furniture designer.

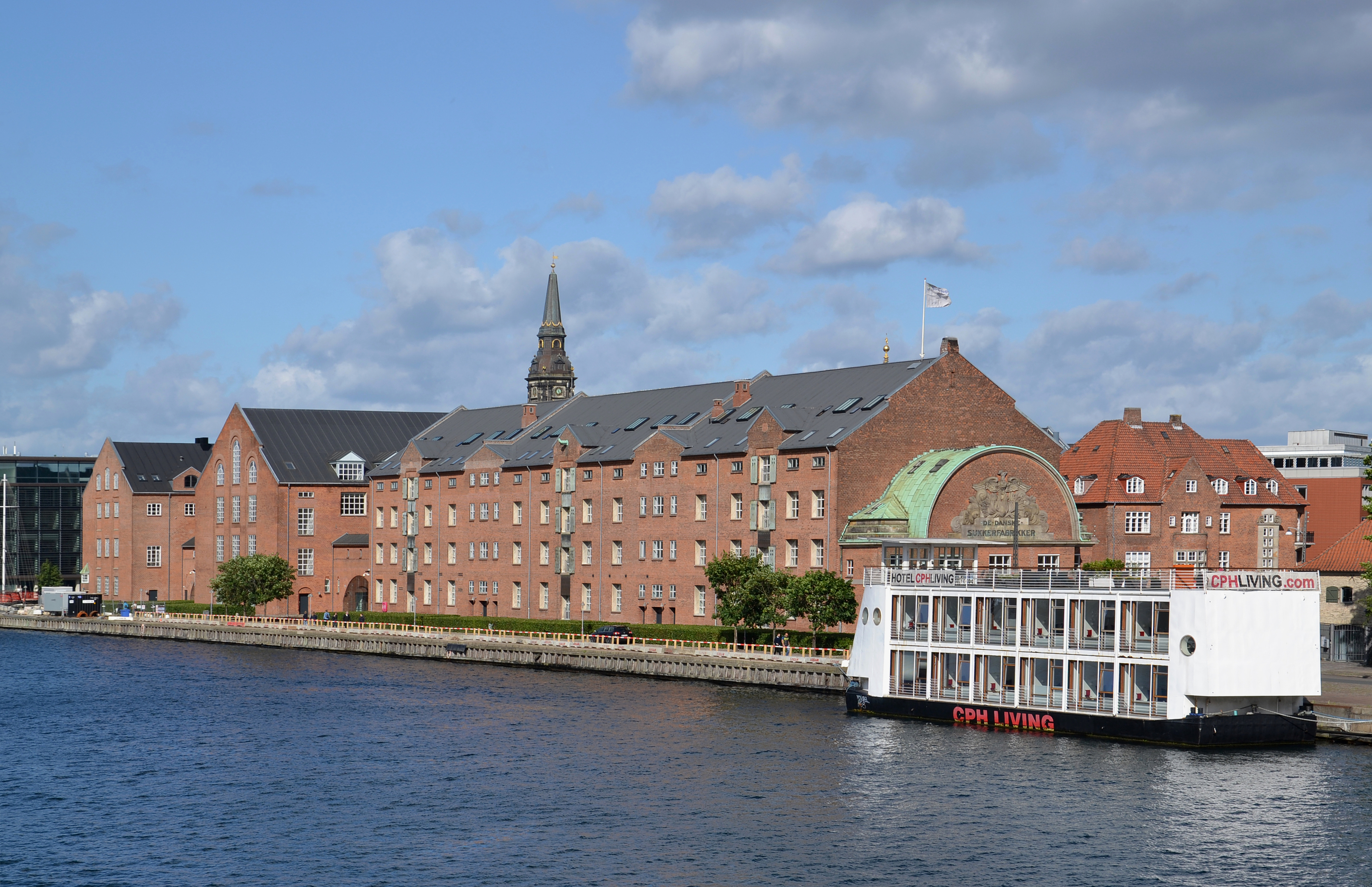
De Danske Sukkerfabrikker at Christianshavn

He was born in Aalborg, Denmark. After training at the Aalborg Technical School (1924) and at the Art and Crafts School of the Design Museum in Copenhagen (1928), Mølgaard-Nielsen studied furniture design under Kaare Klint at the Royal Danish Academy of Fine Arts (1931–1934). His work, which from 1944 was carried out mainly in partnership with Peter Hvidt at the Hvidt & Mølgaard studio, can be divided into three groups: furniture and interior decoration, buildings, and consultancy on large bridge projects.

Hvidt & Mølgaard's pioneering sets of furniture included Portex (1945) and Ax (1950), based on a laminating technique and produced by furniture maker Fritz Hansen. The chairs were specially designed for export, economizing on space and packaging requirements for transportation. Their church chair remained in the Fritz Hansen collection from 1936 to 2004.

Hvidt & Mølgaard increasingly took on architectural assignments (from 1970 together with Hans Kristensen). Projects covered office buildings and factories, including the De Danske Sukkerfabrikker Building in Copenhagen (1958), as well as collective housing projects in Søllerød, Hillerød and Birkerød (1962–1970), all completed in a light, clear and simple style.

The firm also acted as consultants on the new Little Belt Bridge (1970) and the Vejle Fjord Bridge (1980), playing an important part in the success of their designs.

== See also ==
- Danish modern
- Danish design
