= Vejle Fjord =

Fjord in Denmark

Coordinates: 55°40′N 9°45′E

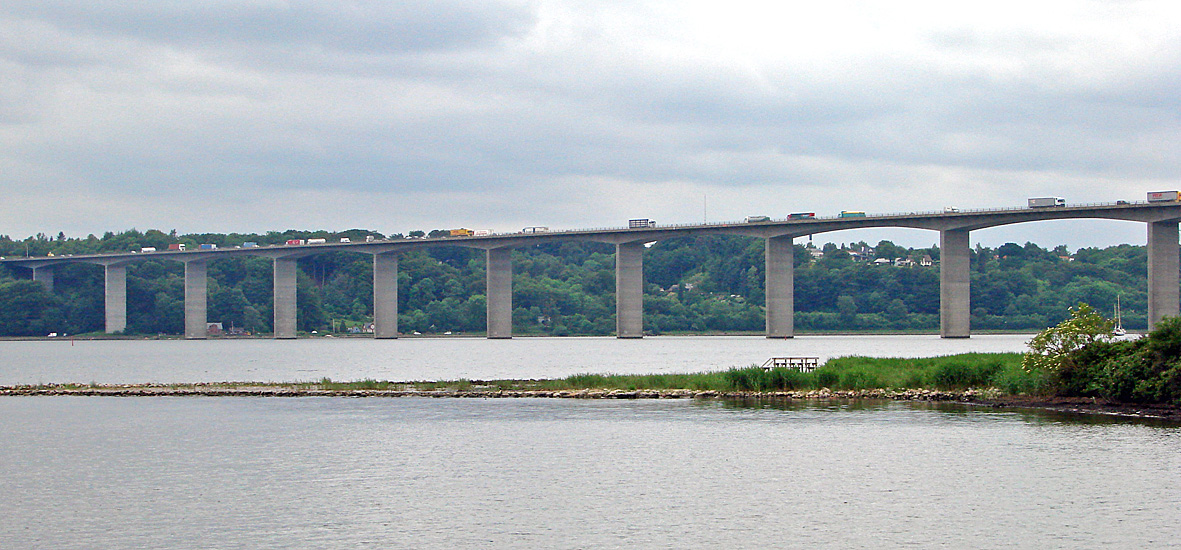
Vejle Fjord Bridge

Vejle Fjord is an East Jutland-type fjord in Denmark. It is approximately 22 km (14 mi) in length, and it stretches east from the town of Vejle at its head to the towns of Trelde Næs on the south side and Juelsminde on the north side at the mouth. The fjord's generally calm surface waters are surrounded by low forested hills shaped by glaciers during the last ice age.

Public works projects have re-shaped the small rivers and countryside surrounding the fjord since the Middle Ages.

Highway E45 crosses the fjord just east of the town of Vejle on the Vejle Fjord Bridge.

A 2022 report by the University of Southern Denmark found that fjord was in a "poor environmental condition" due to high levels of nitrogen run-off from fertiliser use on farms. On 6 April 2024, an open air "funeral" attended by around 1,000 people were organized and held by Greenpeace and other local and environmental groups to decry the fjord's state.

== See also ==
- Vejle
- Vejle Fjord Bridge
- Nakskov Fjord
