= Albert Bertelsen =

Danish autodidact painter and graphic artist (1921–2019)

Albert Bertelsen (17 November 1921 – 10 December 2019) was a Danish autodidact painter and graphic artist.

== Biography ==
Bertelsen was born in Vejle. Bertelsen is primarily known for his landscape paintings and graphic works in green colours. His work often feature the Faroe Islands, but France, Iceland and Norway have also provided him with inspiration. Bertelsen also made object studies and humorous portraits. He states that these are often people he has met as a child, and he attempted to paint them as though seen through a child's eyes. Bertelsen was inspired to take up painting by the Danish CoBrA artist Henry Heerup. Nevertheless, Bertelsen's art is quite different from Heerup's.
