= Social analytics =

Social analytics is a philosophical perspective developed since the early 1980s by the Danish idea historian and philosopher Lars-Henrik Schmidt. The theoretical object of the perspective is socius, a kind of "commonness" that is neither a universal account nor a communality shared by every member of a body.
