= Vejle Fjord Bridge =

Vejle Fjord Bridge Vejlefjordbroen
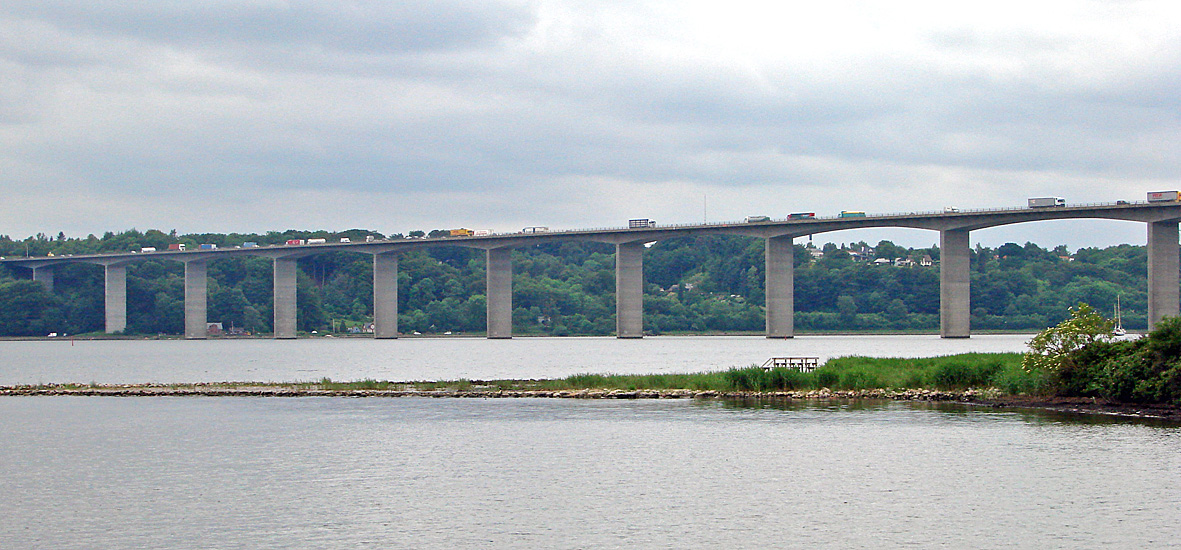
- Coordinates: 55°42′00″N 9°34′23″E
- Carries: Motor vehicles
- Crosses: Vejle Fjord
- Locale: Vejle, Denmark

Characteristics
- Design: cantilever bridge
- Total length: 1,712 m (5,617 ft)
- Width: 27.6 m (90.6 ft)
- Clearance below: 40 metres (131 ft)
- No. of lanes: 6

History
- Designer: Hvidt & Mølgaard
- Opened: 1 July 1980

Statistics
- Daily traffic: 86,000 daily road vehicles

Location
- Interactive map of Vejle Fjord Bridge

Vejle Fjord Bridge (Danish: Vejlefjordbroen) is a cantilever bridge that spans Vejle Fjord between Mølholm and Nørremarken near the town of Vejle in Denmark. The bridge is 1712 metres long, the longest span is 110 metres, and the maximum clearance to the sea is 40 metres. The bridge has 15 spans and carries the European route E45 (before 1992 European route E3) over the fjord.

Vejle Fjord Bridge was built to lead traffic past the town of Vejle, where traffic congestion had become a problem in the 1970s. The building started in 1975, and the bridge was opened on July 1, 1980. It cost 350 million kroner. The bridge now has more traffic than any other motorway bridge in Denmark (if not counting short viaducts near Copenhagen such as the Tåstrupvej viaduct)
