= 2021 Vejle municipal election =

← 2017	16 November 2021	2025 →

All 31 seats to the Vejle Municipal Council 16 seats needed for a majority
- Turnout: 62,052 (67.1%) ▼3.4pp
	First party	Second party	Third party
	V	A	C
Party	Venstre	Social Democrats	Conservatives
Last election	10 seats, 30.0%	11 seats, 30.3%	2 seats, 7.2%
Seats won	12	9	3
Seat change	▲2	▼2	▲1
Popular vote	21,297	18,342	6,696
Percentage	34.9%	30.1%	11.0%
Swing	▲4.9%	▼0.2%	▲3.8%
	Fourth party	Fifth party	Sixth party
	F	D	O
Party	Green Left	New Right	Danish People's Party
Last election	3 seats, 7.2%	0 seats, 1.6%	3 seats, 11.1%
Seats won	3	2	1
Seat change	0	▲2	▼2
Popular vote	4,368	2,420	2,596
Percentage	7.2%	4.0%	4.2%
Swing	0.0%	▲2.4%	▼6.9%
	Seventh party	Eighth party
	B	I
Party	Danish Social Liberal Party	Liberal Alliance
Last election	1 seat, 4.1%	1 seats, 2.9%
Seats won	1	0
Seat change	0	▼1
Popular vote	1,990	669
Percentage	3.3%	1.1%
Swing	▼0.8%	▼1.8%
Mayor before election
Jens Ejner Christensen
Venstre
Mayor after election
Jens Ejner Christensen
Venstre

In the three elections, following the 2007 municipal reform, that had been held prior to this election, Venstre had ended up with the mayor position. In the 2017 Vejle municipal election, the parties of the traditional blue bloc had won 16 seats against 15 for the traditional red bloc. Therefore, this election was seen as a "thriller".

Jens Ejner Christensen from Venstre was seeking a second term, while Martin Sikær would be the candidate for the Social Democrats.

Despite that the Social Democrats were given a fair chance to win the mayor's position, the results ended in favor of the blue bloc. Venstre would win 2 seats, while the Social Democrats would lose 2, which meant they would lose the position as the biggest party in the council. It was later confirmed that Jens Ejner Christensen would continue as mayor.

== Electoral system ==
For elections to Danish municipalities, a number varying from 9 to 31 are chosen to be elected to the municipal council. The seats are then allocated using the D'Hondt method and a closed list proportional representation. Vejle Municipality had 31 seats in 2021

Unlike in Danish General Elections, in elections to municipal councils, electoral alliances are allowed.

== Electoral alliances ==
=== Electoral Alliance 1 ===
Party		Political alignment
B	Social Liberals	Centre to Centre-left
Å	The Alternative	Centre-left to Left-wing

=== Electoral Alliance 2 ===
Party		Political alignment
C	Conservatives	Centre-right
O	Danish People's Party	Right-wing to Far-right
V	Venstre	Centre-right

=== Electoral Alliance 3 ===
Party		Political alignment
F	Green Left	Centre-left to Left-wing
Ø	Red–Green Alliance	Left-wing to Far-Left

=== Electoral Alliance 4 ===
Party		Political alignment
D	New Right	Right-wing to Far-right
E	Liberal Borgerliste Vejle	Local politics
I	Liberal Alliance	Centre-right to Right-wing
K	Christian Democrats	Centre to Centre-right

== Results by polling station ==
E = Liberal Borgerliste Vejle
L = Danmark Først

Division	A	B	C	D	E	F	I	K	L	O	V	Ø	Å
Division	%	%	%	%	%	%	%	%	%	%	%	%	%
Brejning Syd	34.0	3.7	14.1	3.4	1.4	11.1	0.5	1.1	0.1	4.4	23.7	2.0	0.5
Børkop Syd	33.5	2.0	18.0	4.1	0.7	8.1	0.7	1.3	0.1	3.5	25.9	1.8	0.4
Gårslev Syd	31.7	1.2	9.0	4.6	0.6	4.5	0.7	1.5	0.2	5.1	39.0	1.4	0.6
Smidstrup Syd	20.0	3.9	8.6	6.6	1.0	5.1	1.0	1.2	0.1	6.9	42.6	2.1	1.0
Øster Starup Syd	23.4	1.6	6.9	5.9	0.1	6.5	1.1	0.5	0.5	4.5	46.6	2.1	0.5
Jerlev Syd	27.8	1.6	8.0	2.8	0.2	3.3	0.9	0.5	0.2	8.7	43.9	1.6	0.5
Egtved Syd	23.6	2.3	7.1	4.9	0.5	5.8	2.5	0.4	0.1	6.0	45.0	1.4	0.3
Ødsted Syd	24.3	2.3	8.4	5.3	0.2	4.7	0.4	0.5	0.2	5.2	46.5	1.9	0.3
DGI-Huset Syd	33.4	3.0	11.9	3.6	0.4	9.4	1.3	0.5	0.1	3.7	27.2	4.3	1.1
Multihuset Højen Syd	30.9	3.3	12.9	4.7	0.3	6.3	0.8	0.4	0.0	4.0	35.1	1.2	0.0
Vinding Idræts Center Syd	30.6	2.7	14.7	3.3	0.4	5.5	0.6	0.4	0.0	3.2	36.8	1.2	0.5
Mølholmhallen Syd	31.9	3.0	13.7	2.3	0.5	5.8	0.7	0.3	0.0	2.1	36.9	2.0	0.7
Skibet Hallen Nord	39.2	2.5	11.2	2.9	0.2	5.7	0.4	0.6	0.1	2.7	32.7	1.5	0.3
CSV - Vejle Syd	44.4	3.9	9.7	3.1	0.2	10.2	0.9	0.5	0.0	3.1	20.4	3.0	0.6
Rødkilde Gymnasium Syd	32.7	2.8	10.1	3.8	0.4	8.3	1.3	0.4	0.3	3.3	30.6	4.8	1.1
Kvartershuset Syd	46.7	2.8	7.1	3.1	0.2	8.0	1.3	1.2	0.1	3.6	20.8	4.6	0.6
Give Nord	25.0	1.8	8.1	3.6	0.6	2.4	2.4	0.7	0.1	8.0	46.0	0.9	0.5
Thyregod Nord	18.4	2.8	8.2	6.7	0.6	5.0	1.3	1.6	0.2	13.5	38.0	2.5	1.3
Gadbjerg Nord	17.8	22.6	4.7	4.7	0.5	4.1	1.4	0.4	0.1	6.0	35.3	1.0	1.4
Givskud Nord	29.3	2.5	7.9	4.8	2.3	2.6	0.9	0.6	0.3	7.5	38.0	2.3	0.8
Jelling Nord	29.6	8.6	6.7	3.0	0.2	11.3	0.7	0.3	0.1	3.6	33.2	2.3	0.5
Øster Nykirke Nord	15.6	2.6	4.7	3.4	0.8	4.3	1.5	0.2	0.1	8.0	56.3	1.4	1.0
Grønbjerg Nord	13.5	1.8	5.8	6.3	1.1	2.3	1.8	0.7	0.0	5.4	58.2	2.6	0.5
Lindeballe Nord	17.0	4.6	7.4	6.4	0.0	4.2	0.4	0.4	0.0	4.9	53.0	0.7	1.1
Kollerup-Sandvad Nord	15.1	3.6	5.5	5.8	0.5	7.5	0.8	1.3	0.1	6.9	49.2	2.8	0.8
Grejs Nord	38.4	2.3	8.8	5.5	0.1	6.6	1.0	1.2	0.2	4.0	29.1	1.5	1.2
Bredsten Nord	23.4	2.3	5.8	3.5	0.4	4.3	1.1	0.5	0.0	4.6	52.5	0.9	0.7
Nørup Nord	19.0	1.7	4.1	3.5	0.2	7.1	1.3	0.4	0.2	5.3	53.1	3.2	0.8
Hældagerhallen Nord	27.9	2.6	17.8	4.1	0.4	5.4	1.1	0.6	0.0	1.9	36.0	1.4	0.7
Engum Nord	27.6	1.9	14.6	3.8	0.4	8.8	1.2	0.4	0.1	3.0	36.6	1.3	0.4
Nørremarkshallen Nord	37.4	4.6	10.9	2.9	0.3	9.1	0.6	1.5	0.1	2.8	25.5	3.5	0.7
Vandel Nord	21.7	1.6	5.5	6.1	0.4	4.1	1.3	0.5	0.0	4.6	51.2	2.3	0.7
Multihallen v. Petersmindeskolen	31.7	3.6	12.0	3.8	0.2	10.1	1.2	0.9	0.0	3.0	30.7	2.2	0.7
Grejsdalen Nord	32.0	3.6	10.7	5.3	0.5	13.1	0.9	0.8	0.1	4.2	24.2	4.0	0.9

== Results ==
Party		Votes	%	+/-	Seats	+/-
Vejle Municipality
V	Venstre	21,297	34.90	+4.90	12	+2
A	Social Democrats	18,342	30.06	-0.22	9	-2
C	Conservatives	6,696	10.97	+3.73	3	+1
F	Green Left	4,368	7.16	+0.01	3	0
O	Danish People's Party	2,596	4.25	-6.83	1	-2
D	New Right	2,420	3.97	+2.38	2	+2
B	Social Liberals	1,990	3.26	-0.88	1	0
Ø	Red-Green Alliance	1,447	2.37	-0.18	0	0
I	Liberal Alliance	669	1.10	-1.77	0	-1
K	Christian Democrats	443	0.73	+0.13	0	0
Å	The Alternative	421	0.69	-1.18	0	0
E	Liberal Borgerliste Vejle	280	0.46	New	0	New
L	Danmark Først	58	0.10	+0.02	0	0
Total		61,027	100	N/A	31	N/A
Invalid votes		257	0.28	+0.04		
Blank votes		768	0.83	-0.04		
Turnout		62,052	67.14	-3.36		
Source: valg.dk
