= 2025 Vejle municipal election =

Municipal election in Denmark

- 18 November 2025

All 31 seats to the Vejle municipal council 16 seats needed for a majority
- Turnout: 65,212 (68.3%) ▲1.1%
	First party	Second party	Third party
	V	A	F
Party	Venstre	Social Democrats	Green Left
Last election	12 seats, 34.9%	9 seats, 30.1%	3 seats, 7.2%
Seats won	10	9	4
Seat change	▼2	0	▲1
Popular vote	19,135	17,036	7,074
Percentage	29.8%	26.5%	11.0%
Swing	▼5.1%	▼3.5%	▲3.9%
	Fourth party	Fifth party	Sixth party
	Æ	C	O
Party	Denmark Democrats	Conservatives	Danish People's Party
Last election	Did not stand	3 seats, 11.0%	1 seat, 4.3%
Seats won	2	2	1
Seat change	▲2	▼1	0
Popular vote	4,308	4,190	3,464
Percentage	6.7%	6.5%	5.4%
Swing	New	▼4.4%	▲1.1%
	Seventh party	Eighth party	Ninth party
	B	I	M
Party	Social Liberals	Liberal Alliance	Moderates
Last election	1 seat, 3.3%	0 seats, 1.1%	Did not stand
Seats won	1	1	1
Seat change	0	▲1	▲1
Popular vote	2,800	2,374	1,621
Percentage	4.4%	3.7%	2.5%
Swing	▲1.1%	▲2.6%	New
Mayor before election
Jens Ejner Christensen
Venstre
Mayor after election
Jens Ejner Christensen
Venstre

The 2025 Vejle Municipal election was held on November 18, 2025, to elect the 31 members to sit in the regional council for the Vejle Municipal council, in the period of 2026 to 2029. Jens Ejner Christensen from Venstre, would secure re-election.

== Background ==
Following the 2021 election, Jens Ejner Christensen from Venstre became mayor for his second term. He ran for a third term.

== Electoral system ==
For elections to Danish municipalities, a number varying from 9 to 31 are chosen to be elected to the municipal council. The seats are then allocated using the D'Hondt method and a closed list proportional representation. Vejle Municipality had 31 seats in 2025.

== Electoral alliances ==
=== Electoral Alliance 1 ===
Party		Political alignment
A	Social Democrats	Centre-left
B	Social Liberals	Centre to Centre-left
Å	The Alternative	Centre-left to Left-wing

=== Electoral Alliance 2 ===
Party		Political alignment
C	Conservatives	Centre-right
I	Liberal Alliance	Centre-right to Right-wing
K	Christian Democrats	Centre to Centre-right
M	Moderates	Centre to Centre-right

=== Electoral Alliance 3 ===
Party		Political alignment
F	Green Left	Centre-left to Left-wing
R	Kommunistisk Parti	Far-Left
Ø	Red-Green Alliance	Left-wing to Far-Left

=== Electoral Alliance 4 ===
Party		Political alignment
O	Danish People's Party	Right-wing to Far-right
V	Venstre	Centre-right
Æ	Denmark Democrats	Right-wing to Far-right

== Results by polling station ==
Division	A	B	C	F	I	K	M	O	R	V	Æ	Ø	Å
Division	%	%	%	%	%	%	%	%	%	%	%	%	%
Brejning Syd	26.9	3.1	9.7	14.3	3.1	0.9	4.5	5.2	0.1	23.8	6.2	1.3	1.0
Børkop Syd	23.8	2.1	16.6	11.6	3.6	0.8	4.6	5.9	0.2	21.4	6.6	1.5	1.2
Gårslev Syd	31.2	2.1	7.1	7.5	3.2	0.5	2.8	5.9	0.1	31.8	6.3	1.1	0.5
Smidstrup Syd	15.6	5.8	5.5	6.0	4.1	0.6	1.0	8.6	0.0	41.4	9.3	1.2	1.0
Ødsted Syd	28.6	2.0	5.0	7.6	2.8	0.0	1.6	5.3	0.0	36.0	10.3	0.7	0.3
Egtved Syd	19.3	2.5	3.5	6.9	3.2	0.3	1.4	6.5	0.2	42.4	11.6	1.5	0.7
Jerlev Syd	30.6	2.3	4.2	5.2	3.0	0.8	1.5	6.8	0.0	34.5	9.2	1.1	0.8
Øster Starup Syd	22.0	3.9	4.6	9.4	4.8	0.4	2.5	6.3	0.1	31.3	12.4	1.1	1.2
DGI-Huset Syd	32.0	4.6	6.7	12.2	4.8	0.3	2.8	5.6	0.7	22.0	4.0	3.2	1.2
Multihuset Højen Syd	29.8	3.8	11.3	8.3	4.8	0.3	3.3	5.4	0.1	25.6	5.4	1.1	0.7
Vinding Idræts Center Syd	33.3	3.0	6.7	7.8	3.4	0.2	2.6	4.9	0.1	32.5	4.0	1.0	0.4
Mølholmhallen Syd	32.4	5.9	6.9	8.7	4.1	0.1	2.7	2.8	0.1	30.9	2.8	1.6	0.9
Kvartershuset Syd	31.4	4.3	4.1	18.7	2.2	0.5	2.4	6.2	0.3	16.8	4.8	7.4	1.0
CSV - Vejle Syd	39.7	4.2	6.0	13.2	2.9	0.1	2.2	4.4	0.1	18.4	4.6	3.4	0.7
Rødkilde Gymnasium Syd	32.3	3.3	6.8	10.6	4.5	0.3	2.1	5.8	0.5	25.5	3.6	3.5	1.2
Skibet Hallen	40.2	3.0	6.4	7.7	3.5	0.1	2.3	3.5	0.1	27.5	3.3	1.8	0.6
Give	14.2	1.0	5.9	5.3	3.7	0.5	0.8	6.6	0.1	47.2	13.3	0.9	0.4
Thyregod Nord	12.9	1.2	2.0	10.2	2.6	0.1	0.6	7.7	0.1	16.7	43.9	1.1	1.0
Gadbjerg Nord	19.4	5.0	4.4	10.7	2.1	0.3	0.4	4.4	0.1	39.2	11.7	1.0	1.2
Givskud Nord	18.7	1.4	6.0	8.5	3.8	0.8	1.3	6.3	0.3	36.6	12.7	1.9	1.7
Grønbjerg Nord	11.3	1.7	4.8	5.6	3.5	0.6	0.7	7.1	0.2	43.3	19.0	1.5	0.7
Lindeballe Nord	15.8	3.1	4.5	8.6	3.1	0.7	0.7	6.8	0.0	44.2	10.6	0.3	1.7
Øster Nykirke Nord	12.2	0.8	2.3	7.2	3.2	0.2	1.4	7.6	0.1	52.9	10.5	0.6	1.0
Jelling Nord	31.0	2.8	4.2	21.4	2.6	0.3	1.2	3.2	0.3	25.9	4.6	1.7	0.8
Kollerup-Sandvad Nord	19.1	1.9	3.1	13.0	3.5	0.4	1.2	8.7	0.0	36.1	10.3	1.3	1.3
Grejs Nord	32.5	8.8	5.1	9.7	5.8	0.4	1.5	4.7	0.1	24.5	4.4	1.2	1.3
Bredsten Nord	21.4	2.5	3.7	11.1	3.4	0.3	1.9	7.3	0.1	39.9	6.7	0.8	0.8
Nørup Nord	16.8	2.3	3.0	14.0	2.9	0.0	1.2	5.9	0.2	42.0	10.1	0.7	0.9
Vandel Nord	15.2	0.9	2.9	22.2	2.4	0.5	0.6	5.8	0.1	40.1	6.9	1.5	0.9
Nørremarkshallen Nord	28.7	6.5	5.7	14.8	3.2	0.5	6.2	4.6	0.1	21.9	3.1	4.3	0.4
Engum Nord	20.2	7.3	5.1	7.4	4.6	0.1	2.4	3.6	0.1	45.3	2.6	0.9	0.4
Hældagerhallen Nord	23.6	11.1	8.4	8.0	3.7	0.2	2.8	4.8	0.2	32.1	3.4	1.1	0.7
Grejsdalen Nord	28.6	7.3	5.4	17.5	4.8	0.2	2.6	5.1	0.8	20.0	4.0	2.3	1.5
Petersmindehallen Nord	30.1	5.3	6.7	13.3	4.2	0.4	3.0	5.2	0.1	25.1	4.0	1.8	0.8

== Results ==
Party		Votes	%	+/-	Seats	+/-
Vejle Municipality
V	Venstre	19,135	29.81	-5.08	10	-2
A	Social Democrats	17,036	26.54	-3.51	9	0
F	Green Left	7,074	11.02	+3.86	4	+1
Æ	Denmark Democrats	4,308	6.71	New	2	New
C	Conservatives	4,190	6.53	-4.44	2	-1
O	Danish People's Party	3,464	5.40	+1.14	1	0
B	Social Liberals	2,800	4.36	+1.10	1	0
I	Liberal Alliance	2,374	3.70	+2.60	1	+1
M	Moderates	1,621	2.53	New	1	New
Ø	Red-Green Alliance	1,260	1.96	-0.41	0	0
Å	The Alternative	549	0.86	+0.17	0	0
K	Christian Democrats	227	0.35	-0.37	0	0
R	Kommunistisk Parti	143	0.22	New	0	New
Total		64,181	100	N/A	31	N/A
Invalid votes		156	0.16	-0.11		
Blank votes		875	0.92	+0.14		
Turnout		65,212	68.29	+1.15		
Source: valg.dk

== Opinion polls ==
Polling firm	Fieldwork date	Sample size	V	A	C	F	O	B	Ø	I	K	Å	M	R	Æ	Others	Lead
Epinion	4 Sep - 13 Oct 2025	517	23.2	25.7	5.1	12.4	6.5	2.2	3.1	7.2	–	1.2	2.0	–	10.8	0.7	2.5
2024 european parliament election	9 Jun 2024		18.4	15.9	11.8	13.9	6.8	6.0	3.6	7.8	–	1.9	6.1	–	7.8	–	2.5
2022 general election	1 Nov 2022		17.6	25.5	5.4	7.0	2.1	3.3	2.8	8.4	0.8	2.0	10.3	–	9.6	–	7.9
2021 regional election	16 Nov 2021		39.2	26.2	8.3	5.9	4.8	3.9	2.9	1.5	1.4	0.6	–	–	–	–	13.0
2021 municipal election	16 Nov 2021		34.9 (12)	30.1 (9)	11.0 (3)	7.2 (3)	4.3 (1)	3.3 (1)	2.4 (0)	1.1 (0)	0.7 (0)	0.7 (0)	–	–	–	–	4.8
