= Christian Jensen Mørup =

Danish architect

- Born: 4 November 1732; Nørup, Denmark
- Died: 27 April 1800 (aged 67); Ødum, Denmark
- Occupation: Architect
- Buildings: Randers City Hall, Aarhus Cathedral School

Christian Jensen Morup (4 November 1732 – 27 April 1800) Was a Danish architect who primarily worked at Jutland during the 1700s.

== Biography ==
Mørup was born at Nørup in South Jutland and died in Ødum in East Jutland. Christian Mørup's parents were copyholders at Engelsholm Castle and his father a master builder. Mørup was taught the masonry craft by his father and was later educated in architectural drawing and planning by Nicolaus Hinrich Rieman.

In 1760, the master builder of Bidstrup Manor died and Mørup was tasked with finishing the project. The following year he designed an extension for Aarhus Cathedral School which is today known as the White Building. The extension was extensively altered in 1847 when it was given an additional floor and a neoclassical appearance. In 1780 Mørup built Randers City hall which may be his best known work and which was protected as a listed building in 1918. In 1795, he was the builder of a rebuilding of St Martin's Church, Randers.

Christian Jensen Mørup worked in a dated Baroque style with some newer elements such as the lesene-arch framing the porch portal in Bidstrup Church which can be found in all his later works. Randers City Hall also has elements thought to be inspired by works by Niels Eigtved.

== Selected works ==
- Finished Bidstrup Manor, 1760
- Aarhus Cathedral School, "White building", 1761, later remodeled.
- Tower for Gråbrødre Kloster, Viborg, 1761
- Plasterwork on Ulstrup Castle, 1766–67
- Plasterwork in Clausholm Castle, 1769
- Renovation of Søby Church choir, 1769–70
- Renovation of Linå Convent at Silkeborg, 1774
- Randers City Hall, 1778
- West tower on St. Morten's Convent at Randers
- Hospital in Grønbæk, 1770s
- Renovation of Hinge Convent, 1779
- Lemming Convent, 1784
- Sejling Convent, 1788
- Svostrup Convent, 1788
- Farm buildings at Mattrup Manor, 1764
- Tyrsting Convent, 1767
