= Randbøldal =

- Village
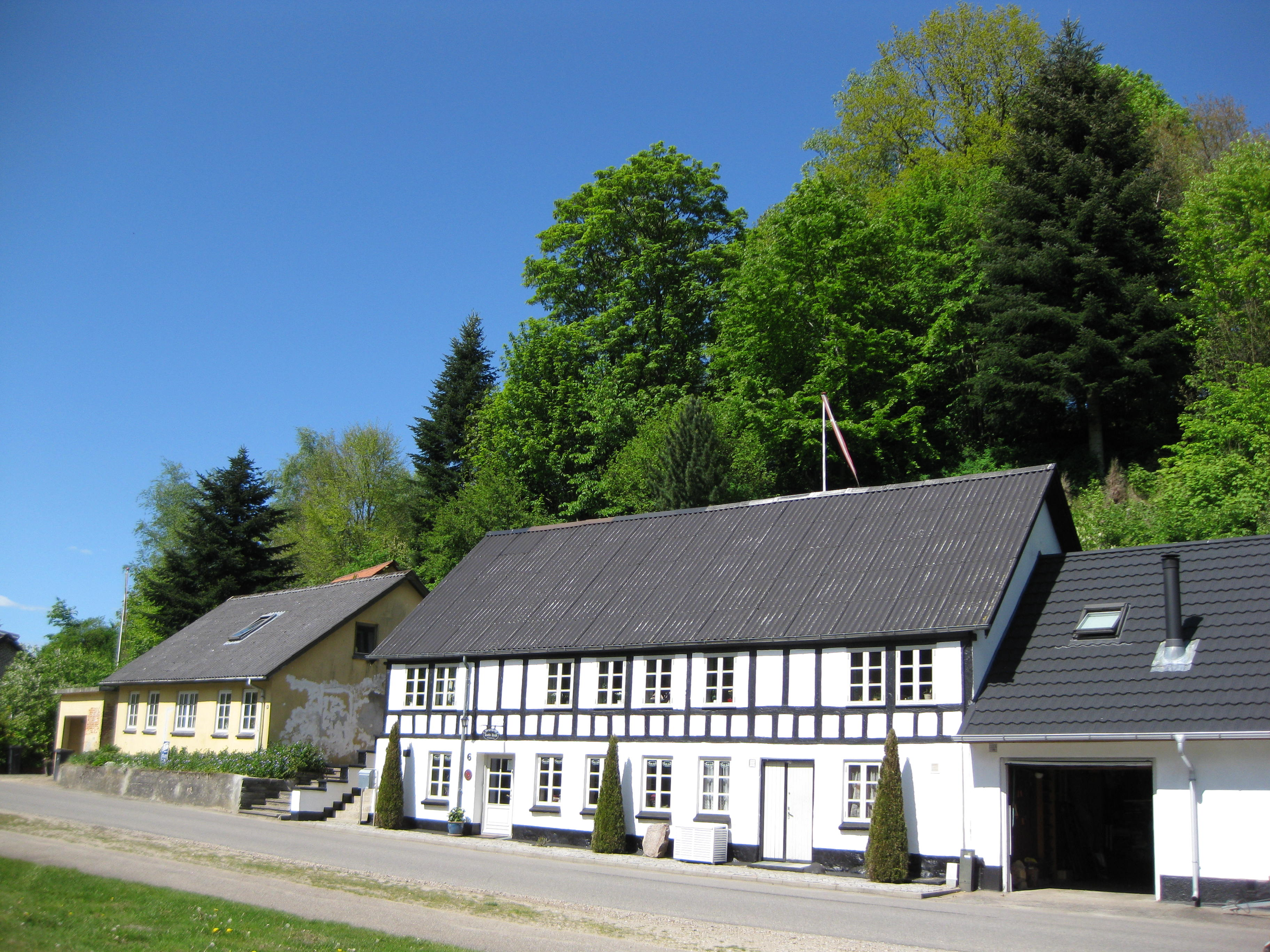

- Location in Region of Southern Denmark Randbøldal (Denmark)
- Coordinates: 55°41′27″N 9°15′44″E
- Country: Denmark
- Region: Southern Denmark
- Municipality: Vejle Municipality

Population (2026)
  - Total: 324

Randbøldal is a small village, with a population of 324 (as of 1 January 2026), in Vejle Municipality, Region of Southern Denmark in Denmark. It is situated at Vejle River 12 km north of Egtved, 11 km southeast of Billund and 20 km west of Vejle.

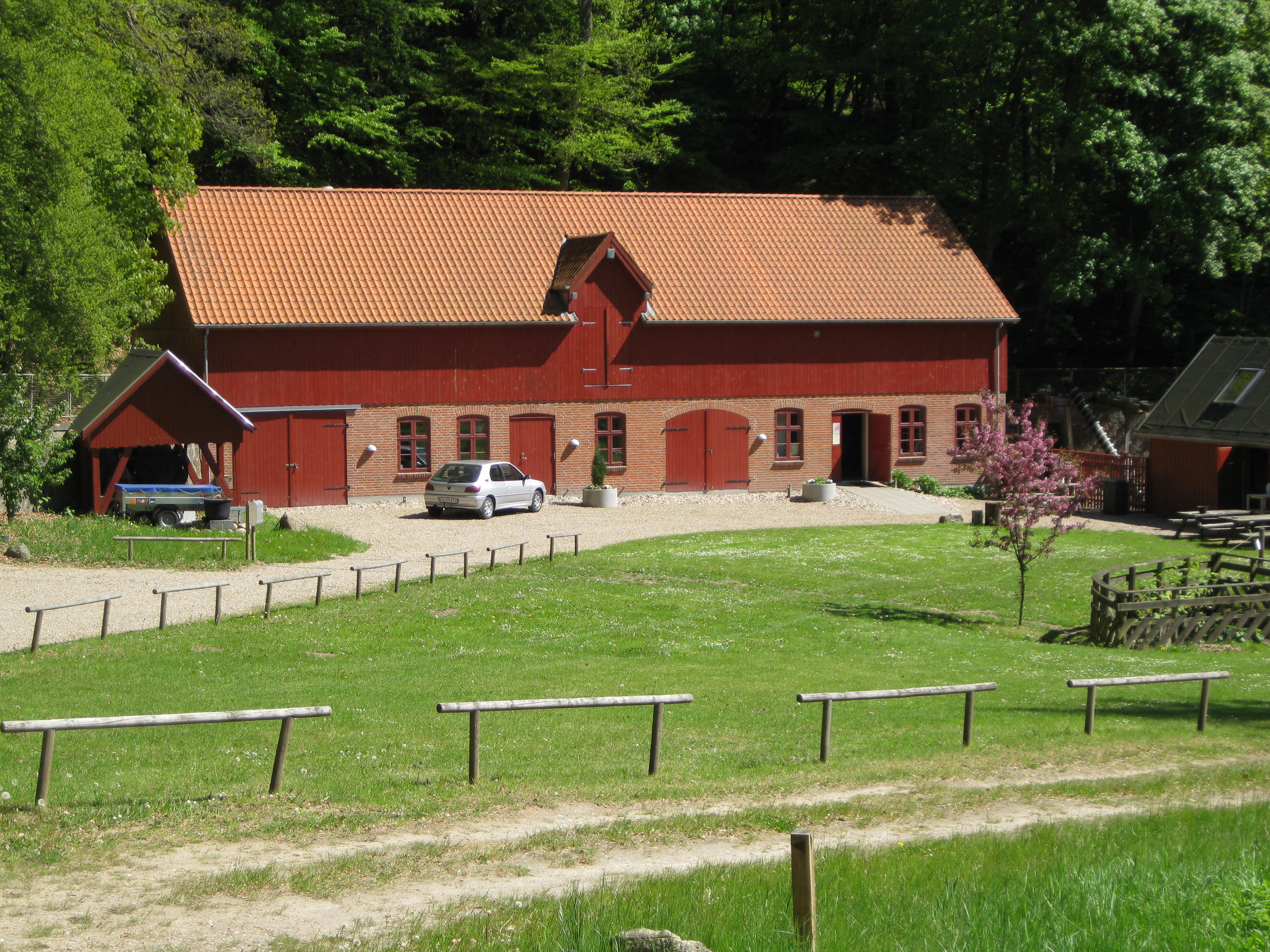
The Randbøldal Museum

The Randbøldal Museum is located by Vejle River in an old paper mill and later textile factory, where it was possible to use the water power from the river. The museum's permanent exhibition tell the story of industrial production in Randbøldal from 1732, when Randbøldal became Jutland's first industrial village, to 1983.
