= Troldborg Ring =

Iron Age fortification in Vejle, Denmark

Coordinates: 55°40′42.17″N 9°20′31.45″E

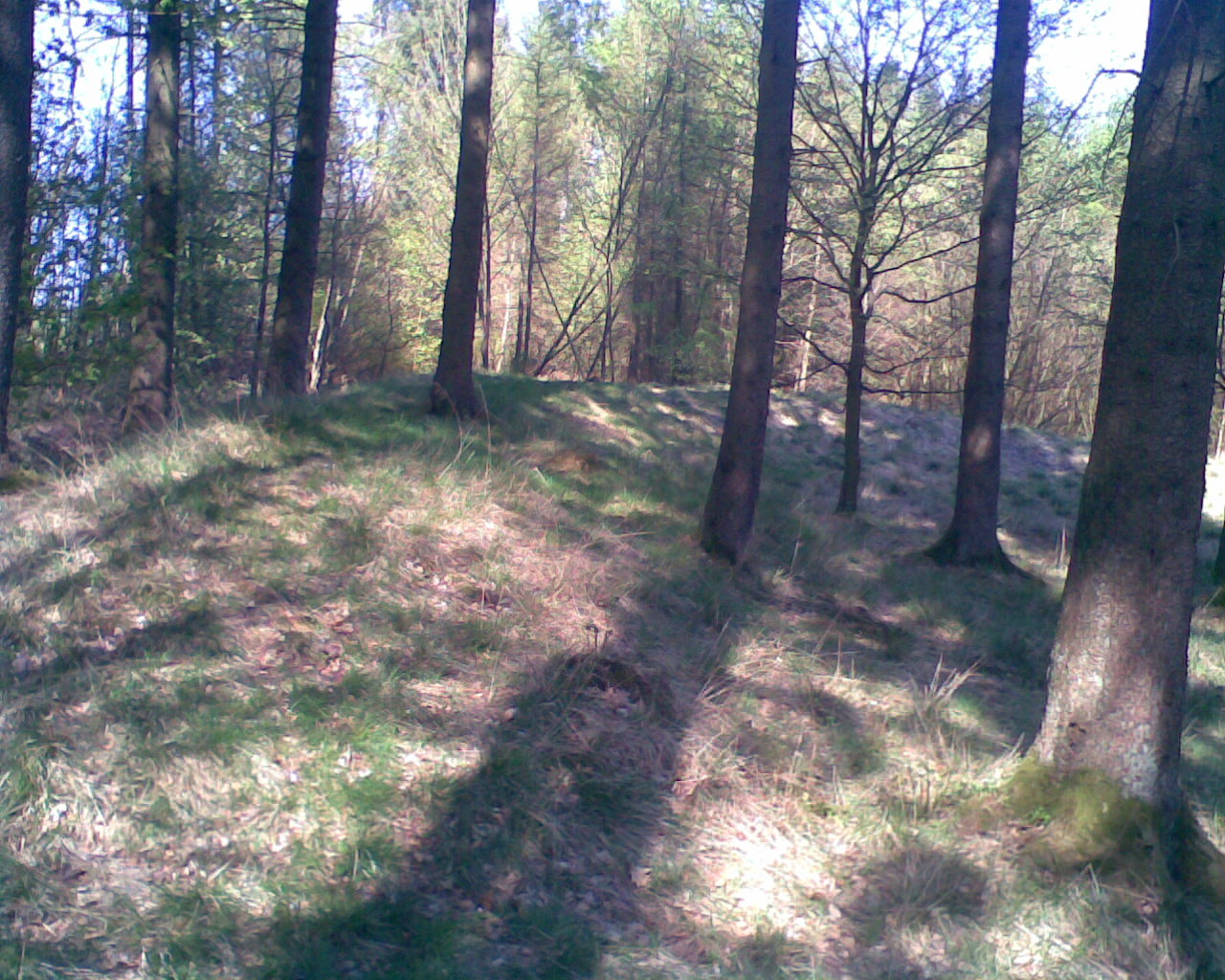
Troldborg Ring

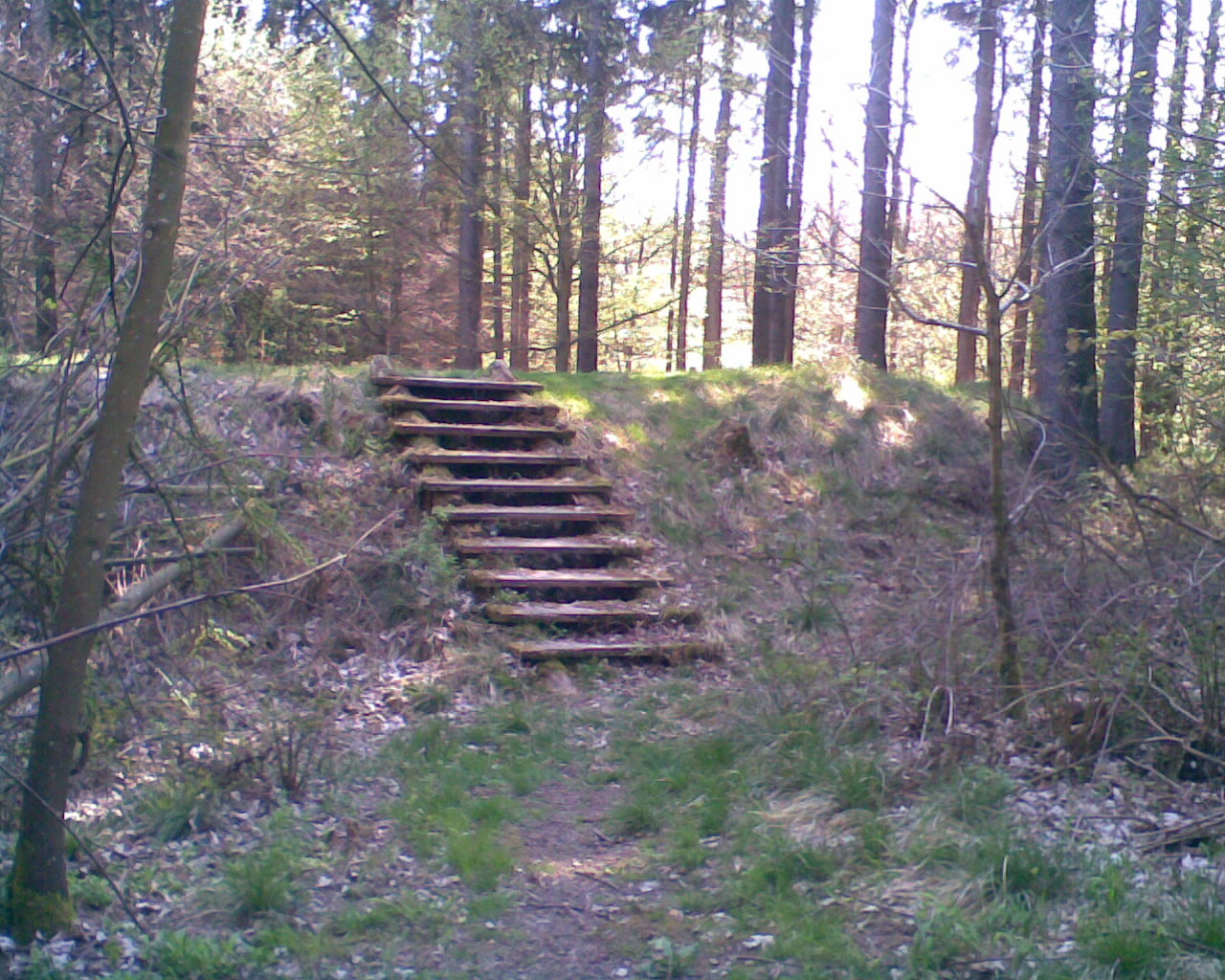
Troldborg Ring

The Troldborg Ring is an Iron Age fortification in Vejle Municipality in Denmark, 13 km (8.1 mi) west of the city of Vejle. It is located at a natural spring on a high point overlooking the Vejle River Valley. The surrounding area is a steep ravine known as the Devil's Valley (Danish: Fandens Dal). The site consists of a raised area of about 1,700 m^{2} (18,000 sq ft) surrounded by a circular rampart (Danish: ringborg). One side is protected by a steep drop of 70 m (230 ft) to the valley floor, while the other side features a 0.5-metre-deep (1.6 ft), 2.5-metre-wide (8.2 ft) moat.

The Troldborg Ring was built around the years 100-200 during a period of turbulence in Denmark, and it was used until around the year 400. It likely served as a refuge during times of violence rather than a permanent dwelling. It is located 600 m (2,000 ft) north of the former Ravning Bridge over Vejle River, built in 979-980 during the Viking Age. Its placement suggests that the area was strategically important even before the bridge was built. A considerable amount of ash from massive fires has been found at the site, although the source and timing of these fires is unclear.
