= Brejning railway station =

Railway station in Brejning, Denmark

Brejning

General information
- Location: Stationsvej 70, Brejning; 7080 Børkop; Vejle Municipality; Denmark
- Coordinates: 55°39′59″N 09°39′33″E
- Elevation: 26.6 metres (87 ft)
- Owner: DSB (station infrastructure); Banedanmark (rail infrastructure)
- Line: Fredericia–Aarhus
- Platforms: 2
- Tracks: 2
- Train operators: DSB

Other information
- Website: Official website

History
- Opened: 4 October 1868

Services
Preceding station	DSB	Following station
Børkop towards Fredericia	Fredericia-Aarhus Regional train	Vejle towards Aarhus Central
Location

Brejning railway station is a railway station serving the railway town of Brejning in East Jutland, Denmark.

The station is located on the Fredericia–Aarhus railway line from Fredericia to Aarhus. It opened in 1868. It offers direct regional train services to Aarhus and Fredericia. The train services are operated by the national railway company DSB.

== History ==
Brejning station was opened on 3 October 1868 with the opening of the Fredericia–Aarhus railway line from Fredericia to Aarhus.

== Operations ==
The train services are operated by the national railway company DSB. The station offers regional train services to Aarhus and Fredericia.

== See also ==
- List of railway stations in Denmark
