= Vejle River =

Vejle River Sønderåen ("South River")
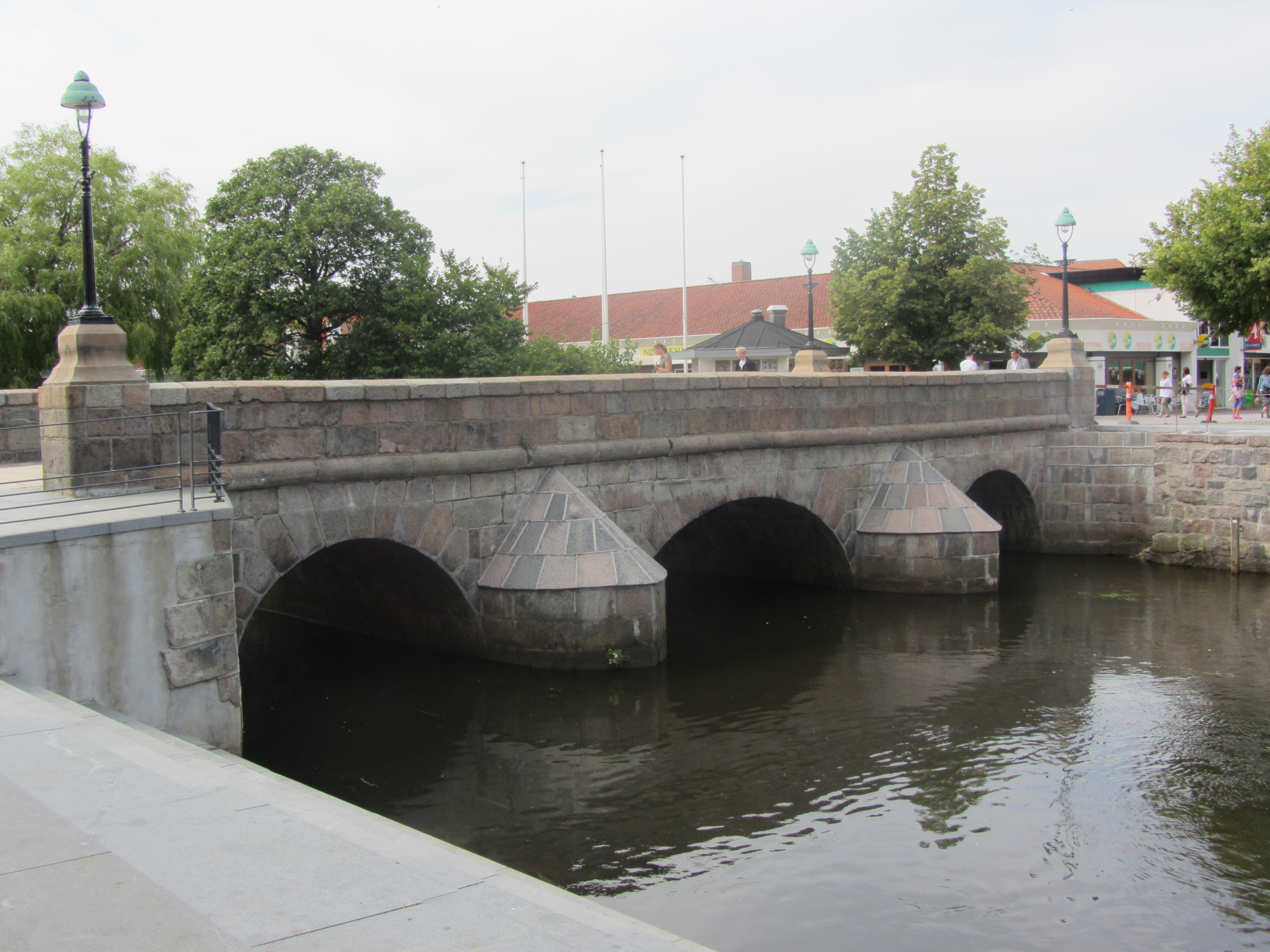
- Bridge over Vejle River in downtown Vejle
- Native name: Vejle Å (Danish)

Location
- Country: Denmark
- Region: Region of Southern Denmark
- Municipality: Vejle Municipality

Physical characteristics
- Source
  - location: Engelsholm Lake
  - coordinates: 55.7168°N 9.30730°E
- Mouth
  - location: Vejle Fjord
  - coordinates: 55.7012°N 9.5570°E
- Length: 32 km (20 mi)

Basin features
- Tributaries
  - left: Grejs River
  - right: Egtved River
- Inland ports: Vejle

Vejle River (Danish: Vejle Å, also called Sønderåen, "South River") is an approximately 32-kilometre-long (20 mi) river in Vejle Municipality in Denmark. Its source is Engelsholm Lake near the village of Nørup. It first runs south to converge with the Egtved River near the village of Egtved, then flows northeast for 20 kilometres (12 mi) through the Vejle River Valley (Danish: Vejle Ådal) until it reaches the city of Vejle. There, the river meets the Grejs River and then empties into Vejle Fjord. Vejle River Valley and Vejle Fjord together form the longest tunnel valley in eastern Jutland. The lower river has an urban character where it runs through downtown Vejle, while the upper river is rural and is used for fishing and recreation.

== Geology ==
Vejle River Valley forms a continuous geological feature with Vejle Fjord, and together the valley and fjord make up the longest tunnel valley in eastern Jutland, with a length of about 40 km (25 mi) and a width of up to 2 km (1.2 mi). The shape of the current valley was formed during the last glacial period, the Weichselian glaciation, which ended approximately 11,600 years ago. Before that, there was already a valley in the same location, with a ground that consisted primarily of mica-rich quartz sand dating back to the Miocene.

During the Weichsel, glaciers advanced from the east, moving up the existing valley. Meltwater from the glacier eroded the valley, shaping it into a tunnel valley. The glacier deposited sand, silt, and clay, and in most places flattened the valley floor. However, in a few locations (near Vork and Vingsted), the ice stopped and began to retreat, leaving behind hilly terminal moraines.

After the ice age, water continued eroding the valley, covering the floor with a layer of organic material. Mussel shells have been found near Rosborg Gymnasium 3 km (1.9 mi) inland in this layer, suggesting that the fjord's water level used to be higher. It is one of the few places in Denmark with limestone in the groundwater.

== Prehistory ==
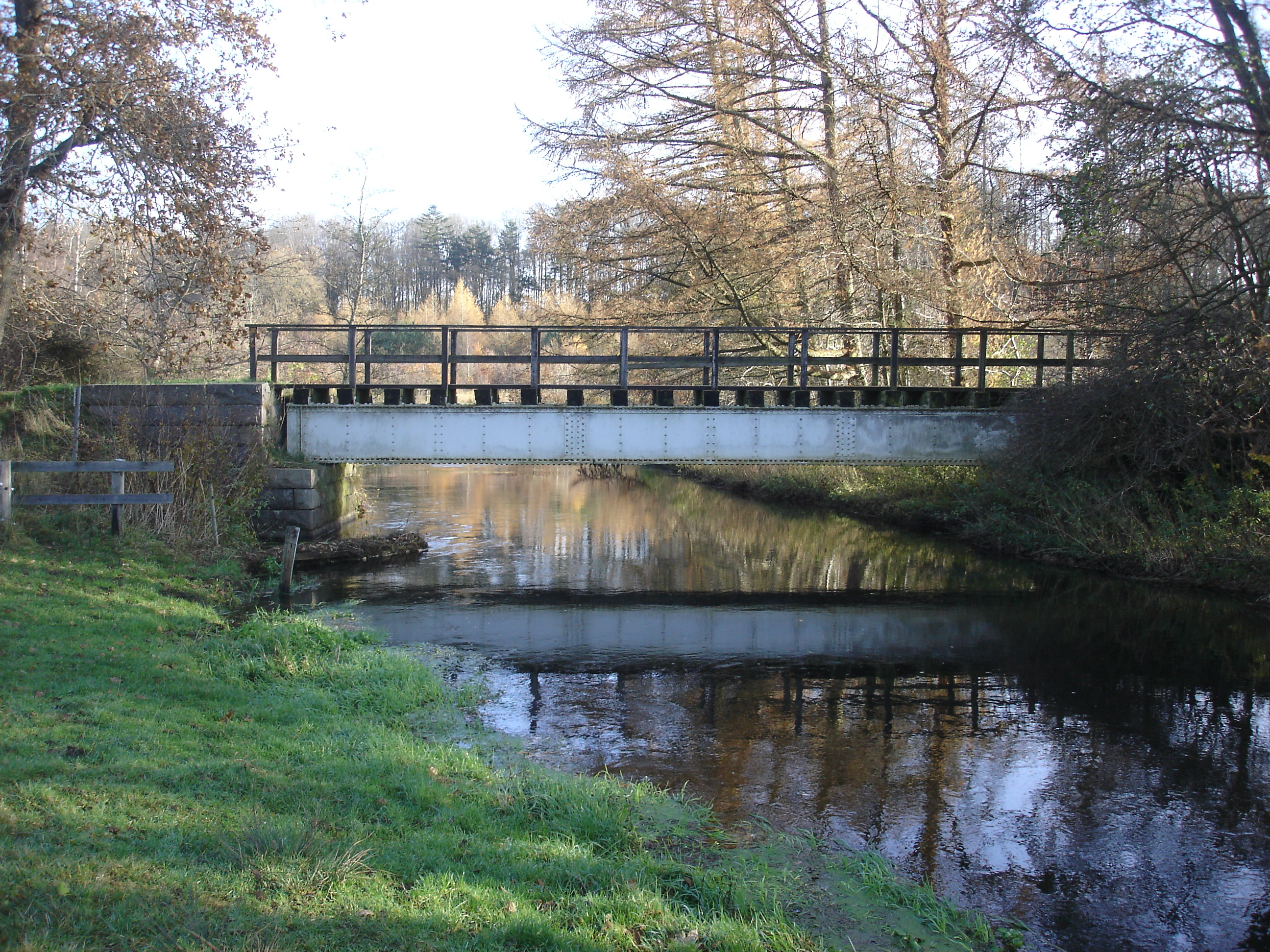
Bindeballestien rail trail crossing Vejle River upstream from Vejle

Vejle River Valley has been inhabited for nearly 12,000 years, and it is the location of several important archaeological sites, such as the Bronze Age burial site of the Egtved Girl, the Iron Age Troldborg Ring fortification, and the Viking Age Ravning Bridge. Crossing the river was difficult in places due to the extensive wetlands, and the 760-metre (2,490 ft) Ravning Bridge was the longest bridge in Denmark from its construction in the 10th century until the Little Belt Bridge was built in 1935.

It has been suggested that Vejle River was navigable from the fjord as far inland as Skibet, as shipwrecks have been discovered there.

== Industry and river modification ==
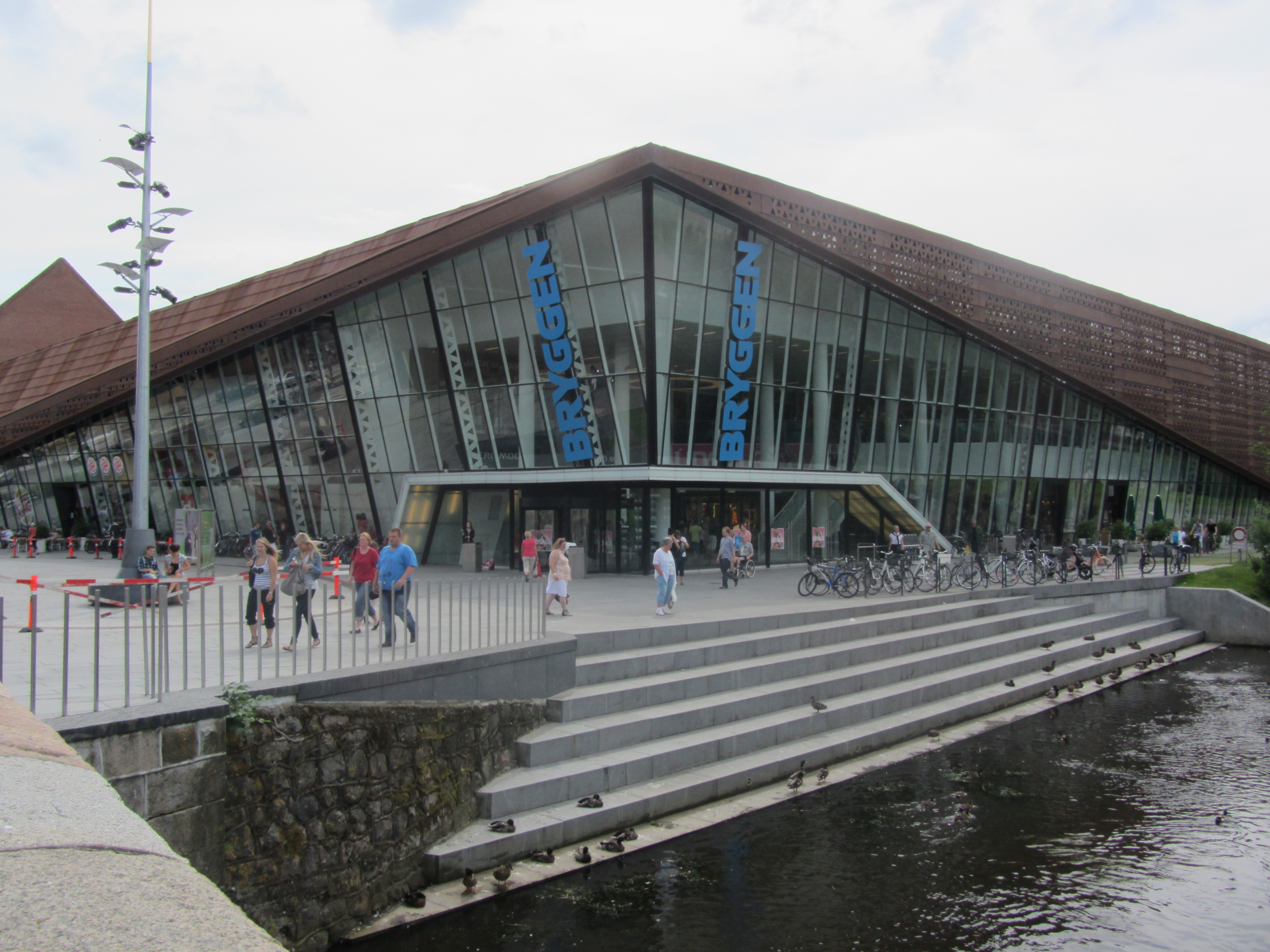
Bryggen ("The Wharf") shopping centre in Vejle with steps to Vejle River

The river's course has been subject to alterations throughout history. From the 1500s to the 1900s, at least 35 watermills were constructed along the river. The earliest mills were built to grind grain in order to bypass the royal monopoly on milling. In the 1600s, the first stamp mills were built, and in the 1700 and 1800s, mills were primarily built or converted for industry and manufacturing. In the 1900s, one mill, Haraldskær Fabrik, was converted to generate hydroelectric power, but it has since closed.

Beginning in the 1800s, the rise of industry and industrial farming led to water management projects that attempted to straighten the river and open up wetlands for farming. In some sections, these alterations were reinforced with levees. From the 1890s through the 1960s, somewhere between 50 and 100 fish farms were constructed along Vejle River. Each of these fish farms consisted of a network of small artificial ponds, further changing the river's hydrology.

From 1894 to 1914, the Vejle–Vandel–Grindsted Railroad, also known as Vandelbanen ("Vandel Line"), was built along Vejle River to connect Vejle with the towns of Vandel, Billund and Grindsted. The railroad operated from 1897 to 1957, and sections of the disused right-of-way have been converted into a rail trail known as Bindeballestien ("Bindeballe Path").

In 2016, flooding prompted the construction of a pumping station at the confluence of the Vejle and Grejs Rivers in Vejle. The facility is designed to prevent high water levels in Vejle River and Vejle Fjord from backing up into Grejs River and causing floods.

== Stream restoration ==
In recent decades, stream restoration projects have returned parts of the river to its natural course. In 2011, 2.3 km (1.4 mi) of straightened river were restored near Tørskind, lengthening the section to 2.8 km (1.7 mi). In 2013, a project near Haraldskær restored an 1.8-kilometre (1.1 mi) section of the river, which included 30 ha (74 acres) of river and surrounding wetlands.
