= Gauerslund =

- Village
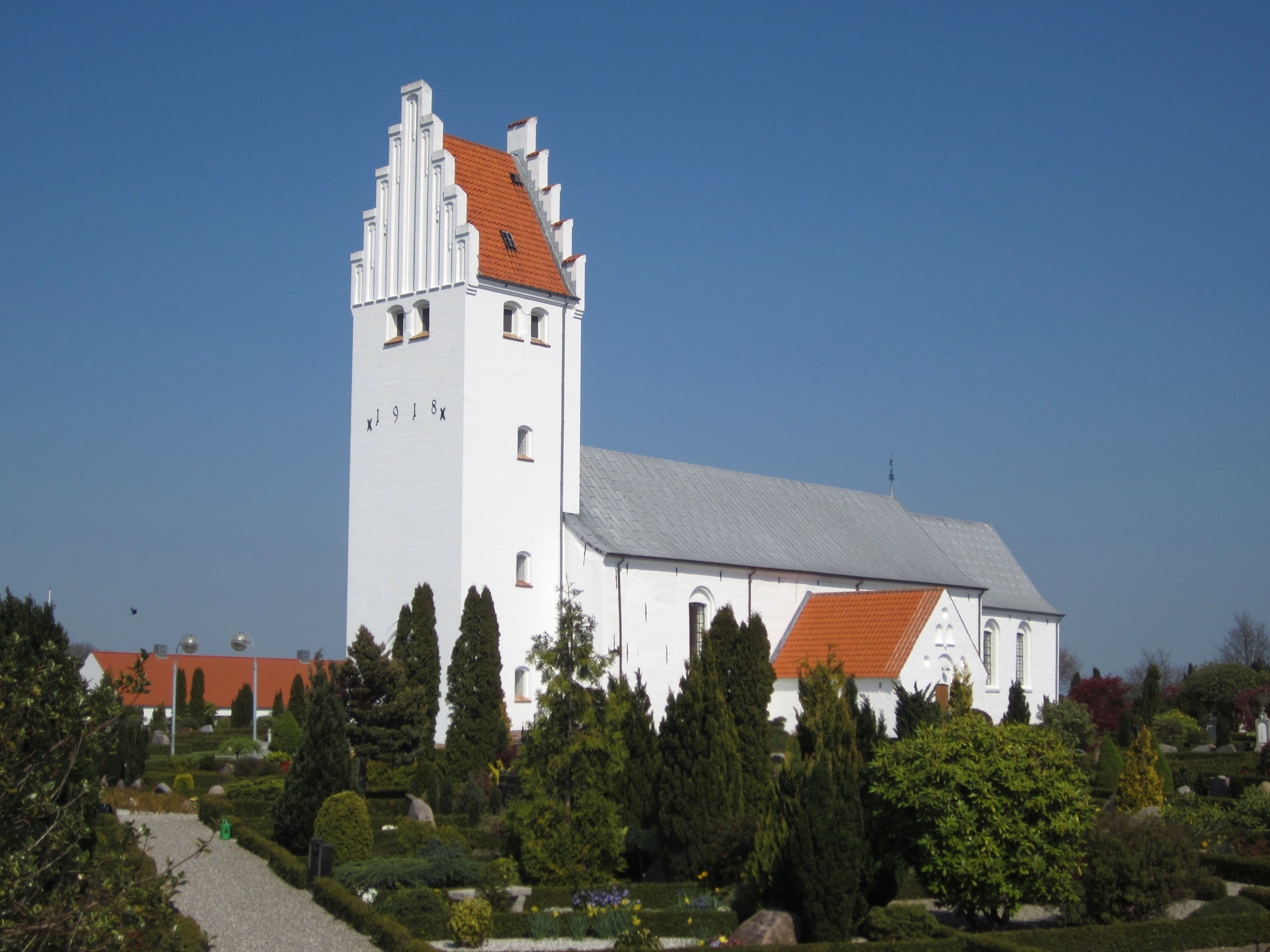
- Gauerslund Church

- Location in Region of Southern Denmark Gauerslund (Denmark)
- Coordinates: 55°39′6″N 9°39′44″E
- Country: Denmark
- Region: Southern Denmark
- Municipality: Vejle Municipality
- Parish: Gauerslund Parish

Population (2026)
  - Total: 259

Gauerslund is a small village, with a population of only 259 (1 January 2026), in Vejle Municipality, Region of Southern Denmark in Denmark located between the railway towns of Børkop and Brejning.

Gauerslund Church is located on the southern outskirts of the village. It was founded in the 12th century and serve both Gauerslund and the railway town of Børkop less than 1 km southwest of the church.
