= Børkop railway station =

Railway station in Børkop, Denmark

Børkop
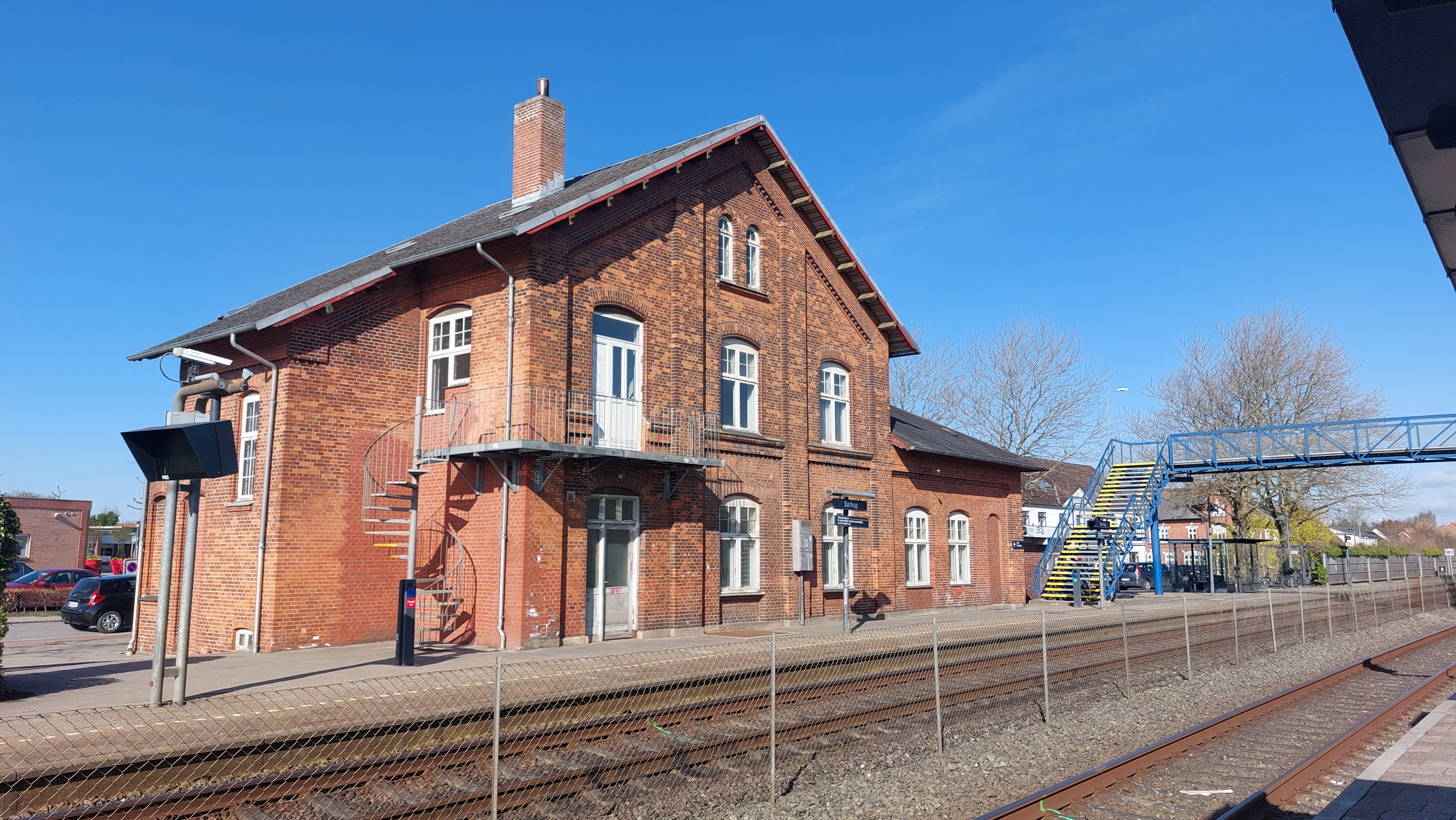
- Børkop Station in 2022

General information
- Location: Jernbanegade 4; 7080 Børkop; Vejle Municipality; Denmark
- Coordinates: 55°38′31″N 09°39′07″E
- Elevation: 24.7 metres (81 ft)
- Owner: DSB (station infrastructure); Banedanmark (rail infrastructure)
- Line: Fredericia–Aarhus railway line
- Platforms: 2
- Tracks: 3
- Train operators: DSB

History
- Opened: 4 October 1868

Services
Preceding station	DSB	Following station
Fredericia Terminus	Fredericia-Aarhus Regional train	Brejning towards Aarhus Central
Location

Børkop railway station is a railway station serving the railway town of Børkop in East Jutland, Denmark.

The station is located on the Fredericia–Aarhus railway line from Fredericia to Aarhus. It opened in 1868. It offers direct regional train services to Aarhus and Fredericia. The train services are operated by the national railway company DSB.

== History ==
Børkop station was opened on 3 October 1868 with the opening of the Fredericia–Aarhus railway line from Fredericia to Aarhus.

== Operations ==
The train services are operated by the national railway company DSB. The station offers regional train services to Aarhus and Fredericia.

== See also ==
- List of railway stations in Denmark
