= Grejs River =

Grejs River Omløbsåen ("Bypass River"), Mølleåen ("Mill River")
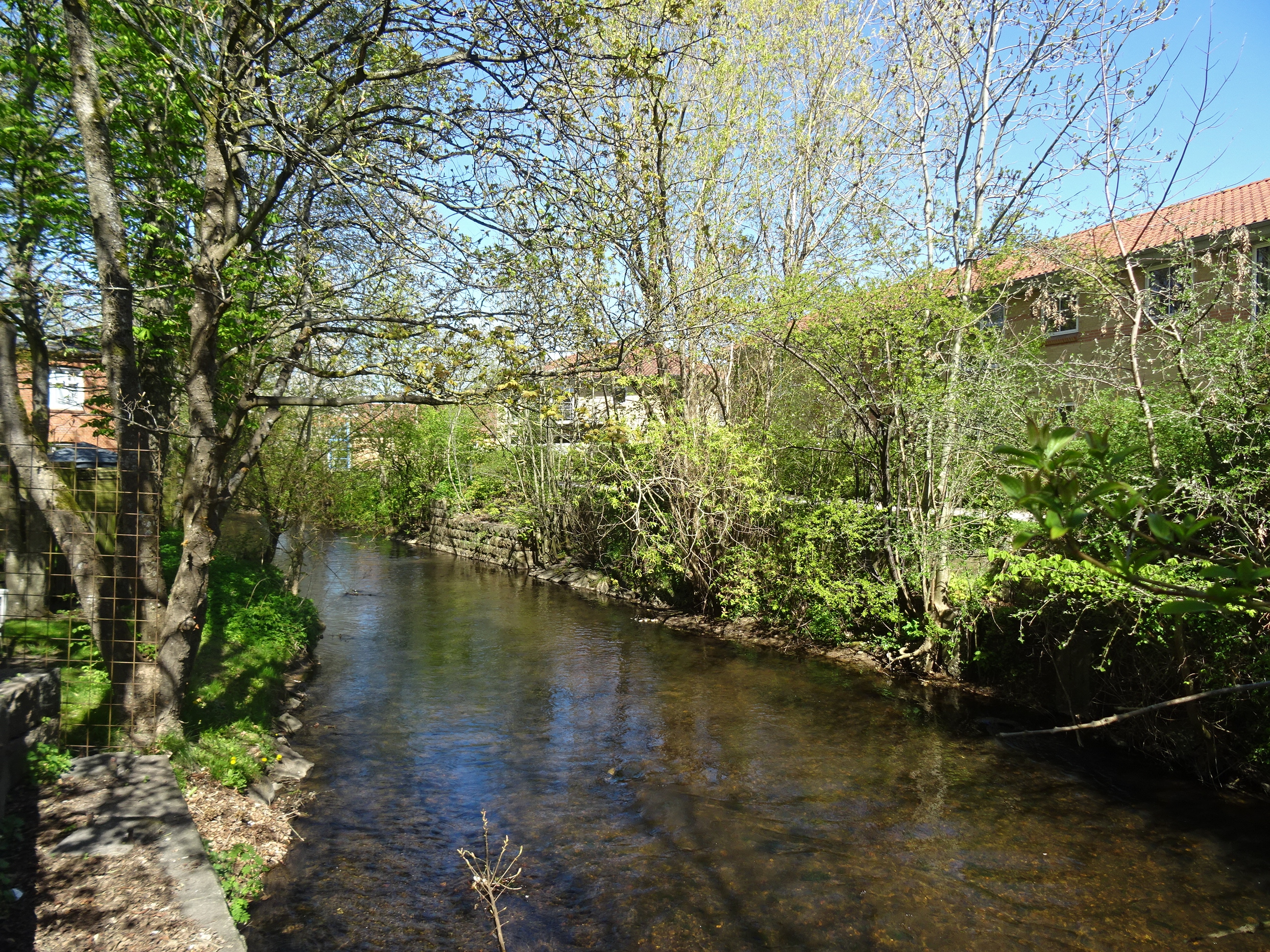
- Grejs River in Vejle.
- Native name: Grejs Å (Danish)

Location
- Country: Denmark
- Region: Region of Southern Denmark
- Municipality: Vejle Municipality

Physical characteristics
- Source
  - location: Fårup Lake
  - coordinates: 55.73703°N 9.41675°E
- Mouth
  - location: Vejle River
  - coordinates: 55.70549°N 9.53439°E
- Length: 22 km (14 mi)

Basin features
- River system: Vejle River
- Landmarks: Grejsdalen ("Grejs Valley")

Grejs River (Danish: Grejs Å) is an approximately 22-kilometre-long (14 mi) river in Vejle Municipality in Denmark. Its source is Fårup Lake, south of the village of Jelling. It starts by heading east through a tunnel valley, then turns south to run through Grejs Valley (Danish: Grejsdalen), the largest gorge in Denmark, until it reaches the city of Vejle. North of Vejle, it splits into two branches, Omløbsåen ("Bypass River") and Mølleåen ("Mill River"). Omløbsåen runs west around the city centre to meet Vejle River, while Mølleåen flows through the city and empties into Vejle River just south of the city centre.

== Grejs Valley ==
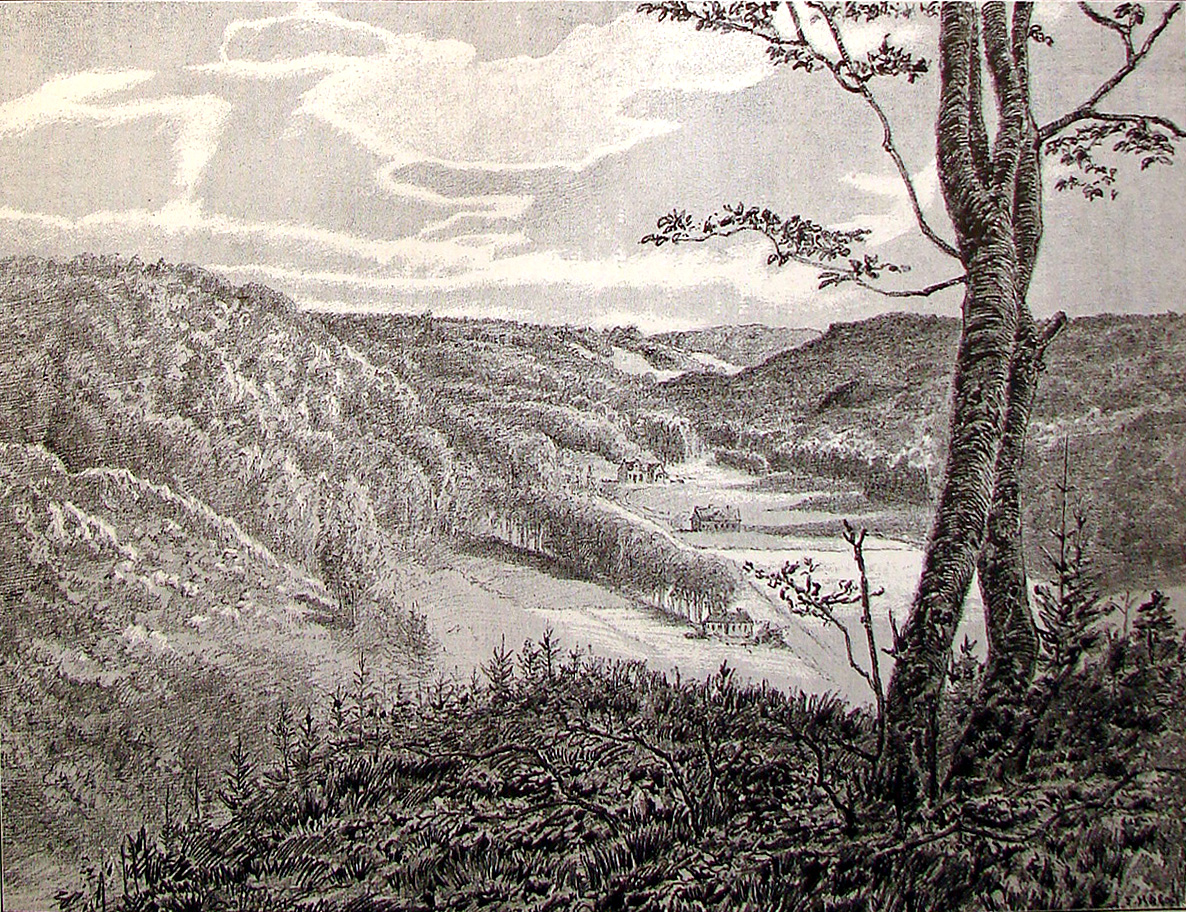
19th-century drawing of Grejs Valley by Niels Andreas Bredal

A section of the Grejs River runs through Grejs Valley (Danish: Grejsdalen), the largest gorge in Denmark. The gorge is about 1 kilometre (0.62 mi) long and 50 to 70 metres (160 to 230 ft) deep. The gorge's cliffs are primarily travertine and limestone, some of which has been quarried as a building material. The traditional churches in nearby Hornstrup, Hover, and Jelling, as well as the modern Grejs Church, are built with Grejs Valley stone.

== History ==
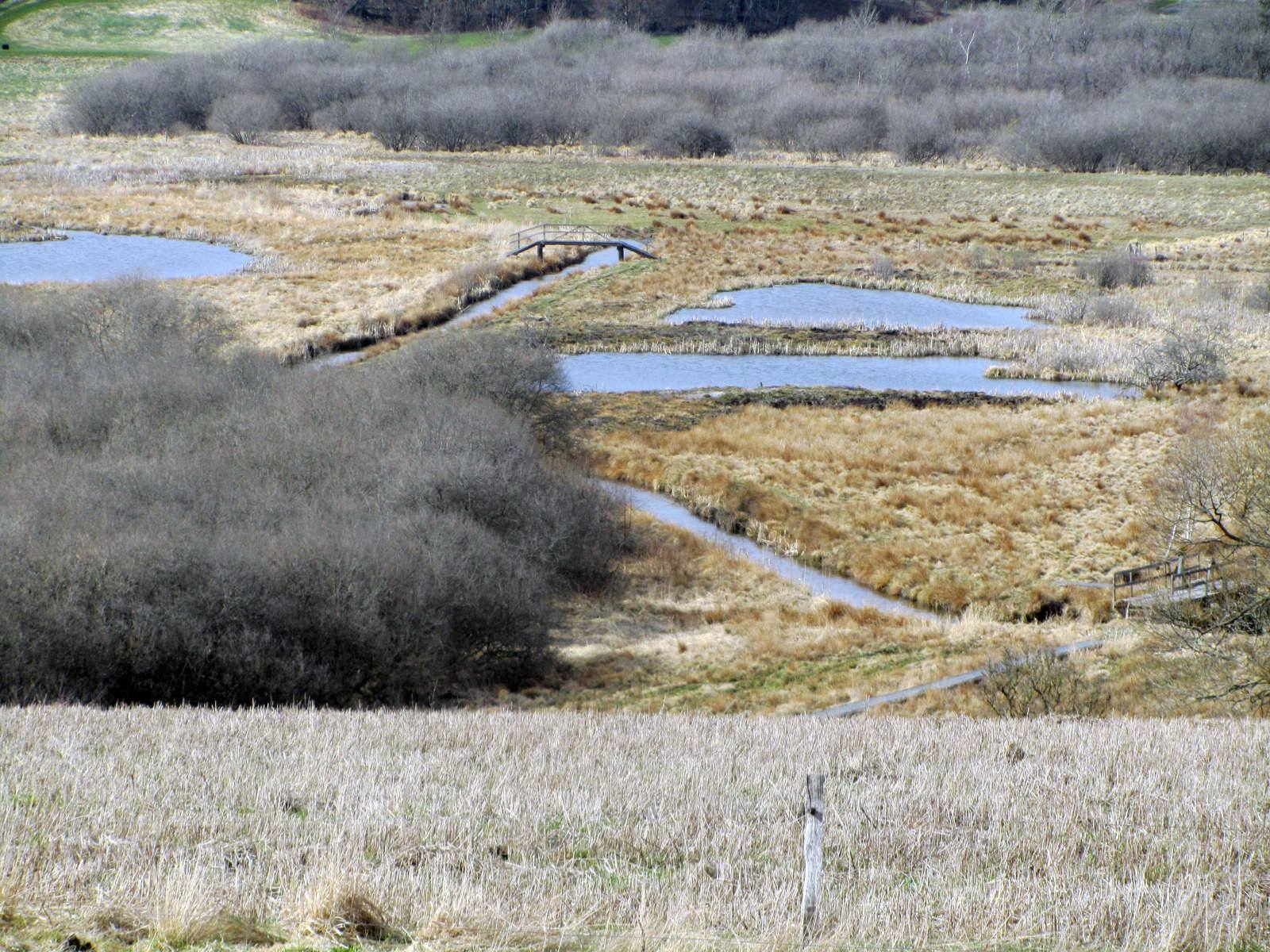
Grejs River near its source at Fårup Lake

During the Industrial Revolution, Grejs River was used as a source of water power for about 14 watermills, which powered textile, paper, and metal factories. For example, Grejs Mølle Klædefabrik (Grejs Mill Textile Factory) was the country's largest private textile factory in 1830, employing 150 people. At the height of its activity around the turn of the twentieth century, the river had the highest concentration of industrial mills in the country.

As of 2016, a pumping station was under construction at the confluence of Vejle River and the Omløbsåen branch of Grejs River in order to prevent high water levels in Vejle River and Vejle Fjord from backing up into Grejs River and causing floods.

== Preservation ==
In 1929, 220 hectares (540 acres) of the upper Grejs River and the nearby Lerbæk Forest were set aside as a nature preserve, and in 2007, an additional 35 hectares (86 acres) were added to the preserve. The area was also designated a Natura 2000 nature conservation area.

A 2.3-kilometre (1.4 mi) section of the upper river near Fårup Lake has been restored. In the 2000s, some sections of the lower river in Vejle that had been culverted were daylighted.
