= Gårslev =

- Town
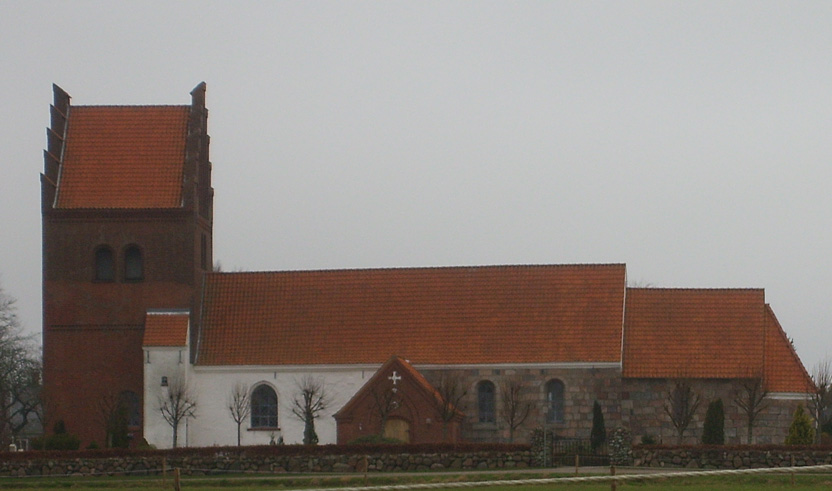
- Gårslev Church

- Location within Region of Southern Denmark Location within Denmark
- Coordinates: 55°38′14″N 9°42′6″E
- Country: Denmark
- Region: Southern Denmark
- Municipality: Vejle Municipality

Area
  - Urban: 0.8 km^{2} (0.31 sq mi)

Population (2026)
  - Urban: 1,355
  - Urban density: 1,700/km^{2} (4,400/sq mi)
- Time zone: UTC+1 (CET)
  - Summer (DST): UTC+2 (CEST)
- Postal code: DK-7080 Børkop

Gårslev is a small town, with a population of 1,355 (1 January 2026), in Vejle Municipality, Region of Southern Denmark in Denmark.

Gårslev is located between Vejle and Fredericia, 3 km east of Børkop.

Gårslev Church, built in the 12th century, is located in the southwestern part of the town.
