= Ravning Bridge =

Ravning Bridge Ravningbroen
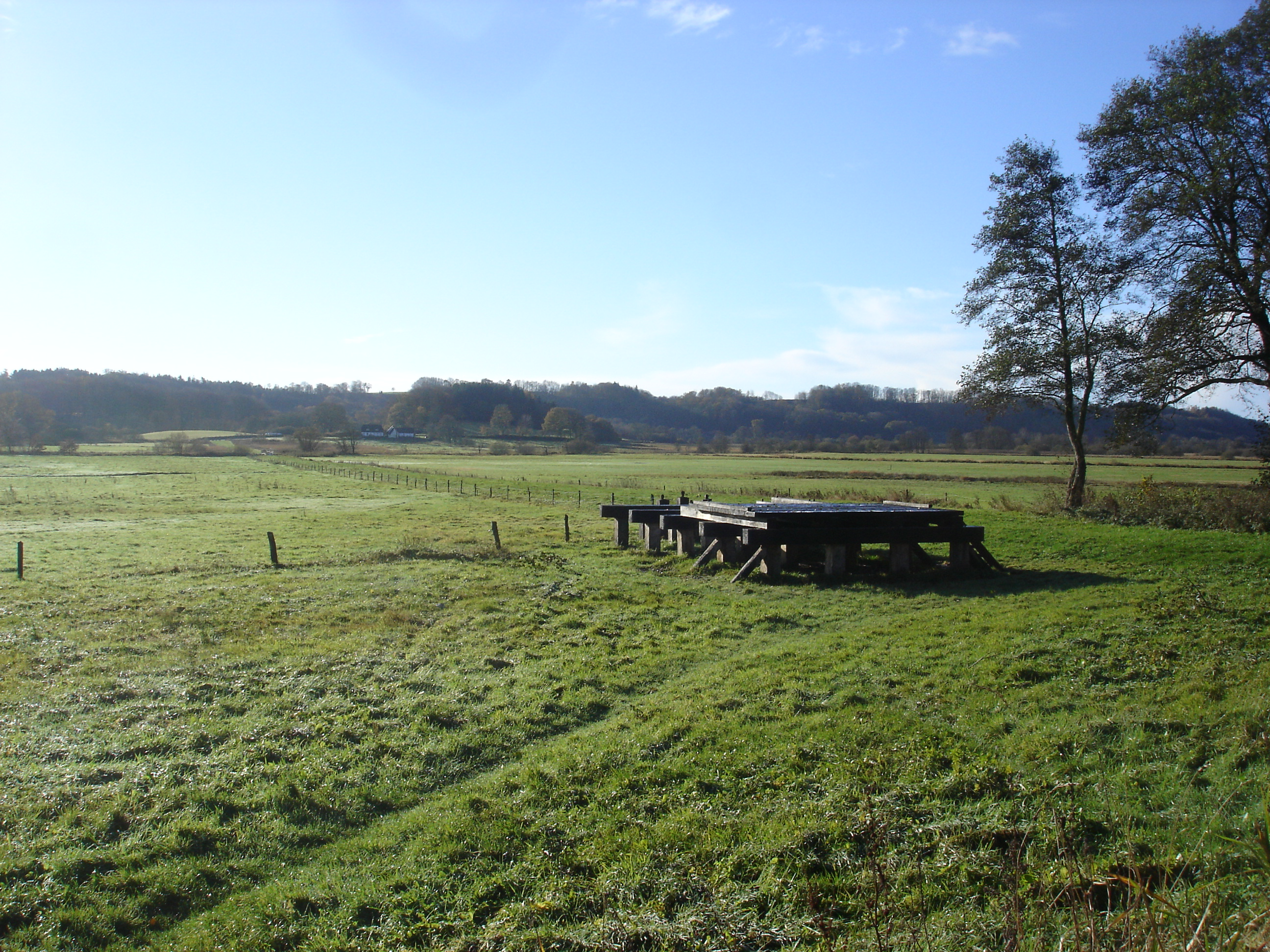
- A reconstructed span
- Coordinates: 55°40′30″N 9°21′0″E
- Crosses: Vejle River Valley
- Locale: Denmark

Characteristics
- Material: Oak
- Total length: 760 m (2,493 ft)
- Width: 5.5 m (18 ft)
- Height: min. 1.5 m (5 ft)
- No. of spans: 280

The Ravning Bridge (Danish: Ravningbroen) was a former 760 m long timber bridge, built in Denmark in the 10th century during the Viking Age. Located 10 km south of Jelling near the village of Ravning, it crossed the meadows of Ravning Enge at Vejle River.

Until the Little Belt Bridge was constructed in 1935, it was the longest bridge in Denmark.

== Discovery and dating ==
In 1953, big shaped oak timber was found near Ravning at the south side of the Vejle River Valley. An amateur archaeologist, K.V. Christensen, heard about the findings, and measured the timber. Later more timber was found where ponds for fish farming were constructed, this time at the north side of the valley. K.V. Christensen concluded that the timber probably was from a bridge and wrote an article about that in 1959. Later the mire in the river valley sank as the result of drainage and regulation of Vejle River, and the top of some of the bridge posts came over the ground surface. Now the National Museum of Denmark became involved. A piece of oak was dated by radiocarbon dating to year 980 with an uncertainty of 100 years, and it was decided to make an excavation which started in 1972.

The National Museum made dendrochronological analyses of samples of the timber from the bridge. The conclusion was that the timber was felled in the 980s, probably in the first half of the decade. The end date of the interval has been questioned by another dendrochronologist who concludes that the date cannot be stated more precisely than "after c. 980 and before c. 1010"

Ravning Bridge (Denmark)
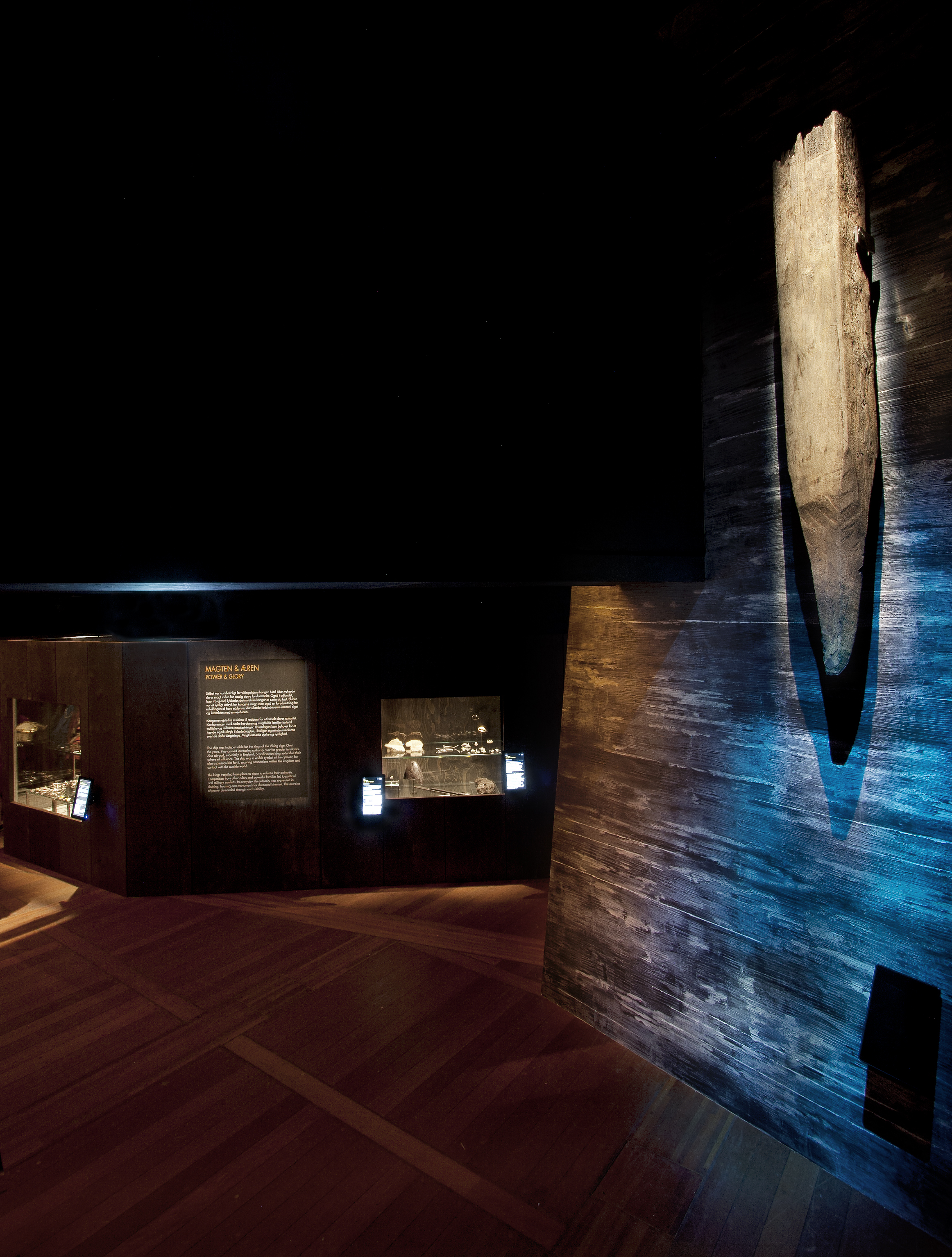
Oak post from the bridge at National Museum of Denmark, Copenhagen

== Construction and purpose ==
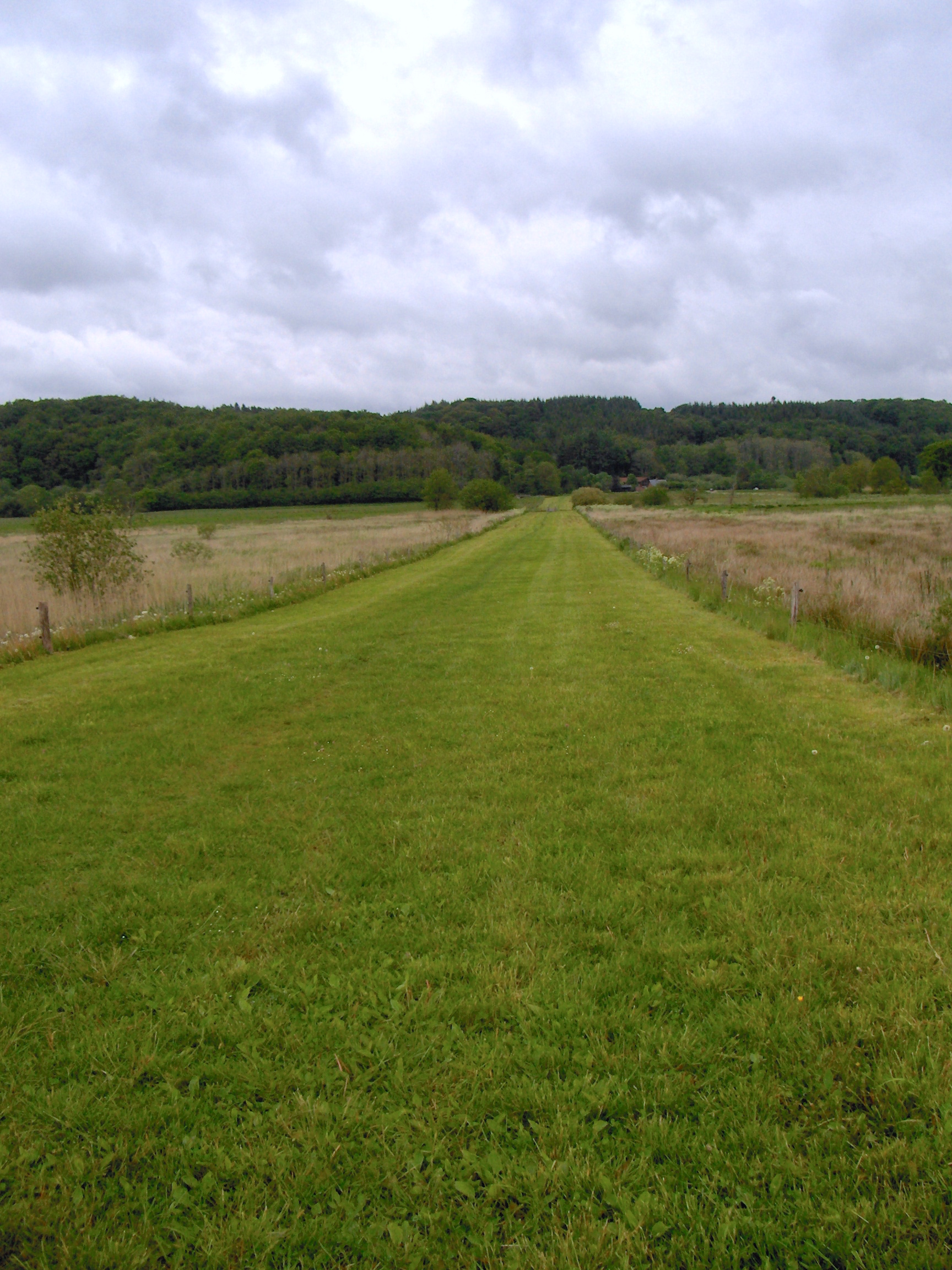
The run of the former Viking Age Ravning Bridge, across the meadows of Ravning Enge.

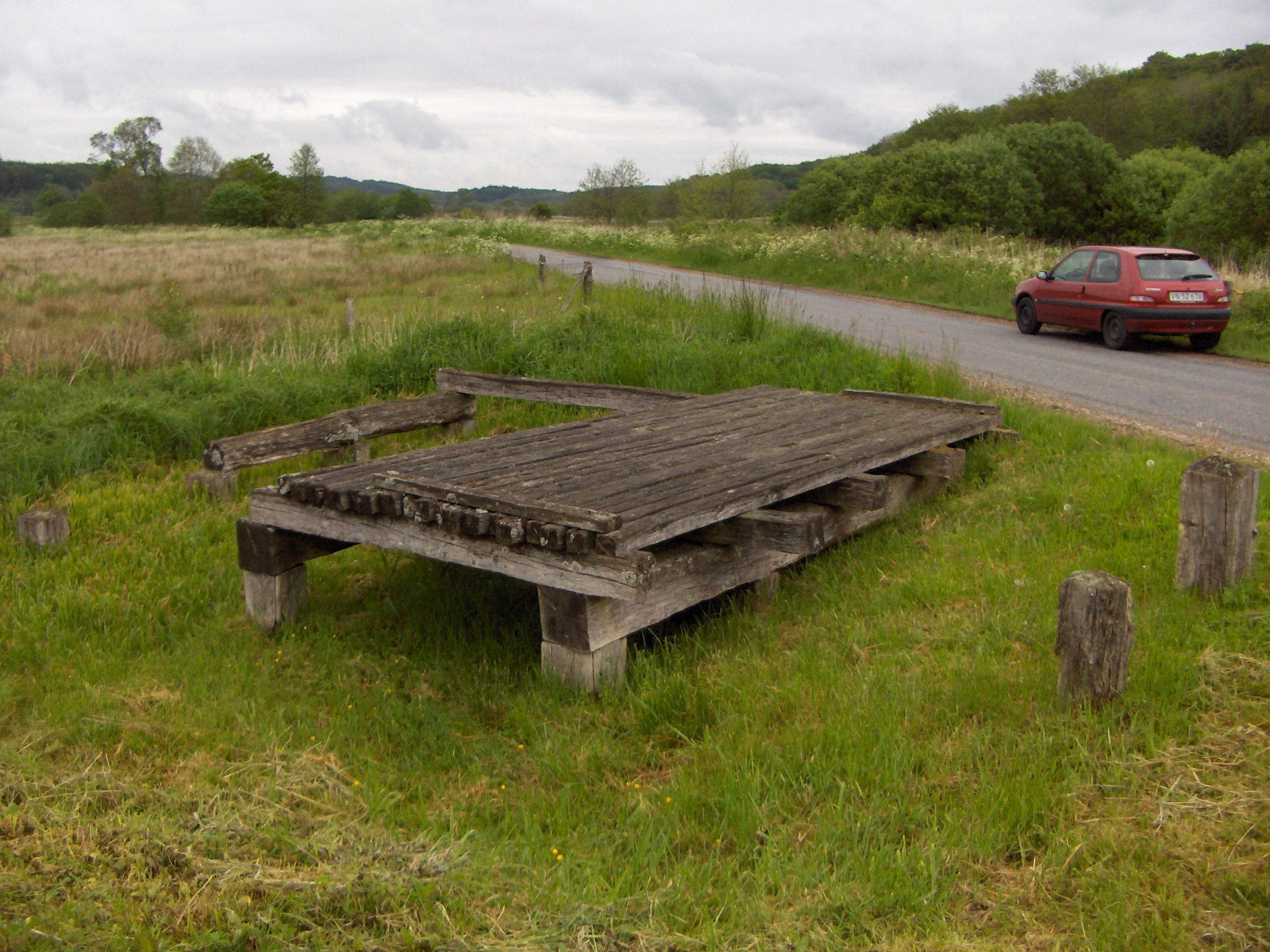
Remains of the Ravning Bridge. The planks only cover a third of its former width.

The Ravning Bridge is thought to have been built in the Viking Age around 980 AD, as ordered by King Harald Bluetooth, who also built the Viking ring castles. Like these fortresses, the Ravning Bridge was in use for a short time.

The bridge, 5 metres wide and almost 760 metres long. was built with oak timber. The spans were 2.4 m long and 5.5 m wide. The bridge had 280 piers consisting of four vertical posts placed at a distance of 1.2 m, and two smaller slanted post at the ends. The vertical posts were square with sides of 30 x 30 cm and up to 6 m long. Over the vertical posts were placed 5.5 m long, 25–30 cm high and more than double as wide horizontal girders. The girders were connected by longitudinal beams on which the deck of the bridge was built. The deck area covered 3,800 square meters, and it is estimated that more than 300 ha of oak forest was felled to construct the bridge.

The purpose of the Ravning Bridge has been much debated, but later excavations in 1993 and 1996 revealed that it was used both as a trading bridge and a jetty for ships. In the Viking Age the water levels were higher in the Vejle River Valley and ships could navigate further inland and so dock closer to the important royal seat of Jelling. The width of the bridge allowed two trading wagons to pass each other.
