= Brejning =

- Town
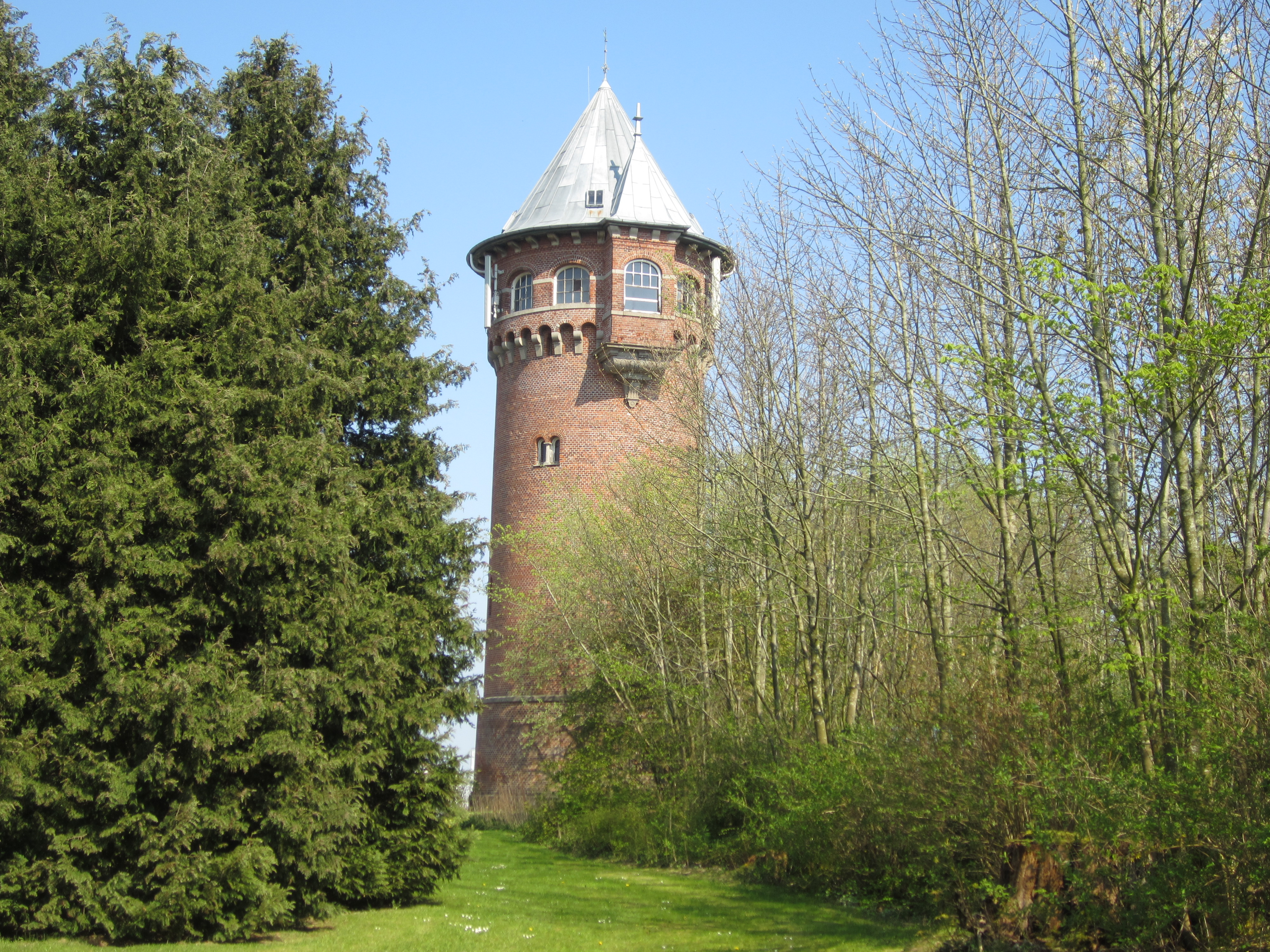
- Brejning Watertower by architect Vilhelm Klein

- Location in Denmark Brejning (Region of Southern Denmark)
- Coordinates: 55°39′55″N 9°40′21″E
- Country: Denmark
- Region: Southern Denmark
- Municipality: Vejle Municipality
- Parish: Gauerslund Parish

Area
  - Urban: 2 km^{2} (0.77 sq mi)

Population (2026)
  - Urban: 3,149
  - Urban density: 1,600/km^{2} (4,100/sq mi)
- Time zone: UTC+1 (CET)
  - Summer (DST): UTC+2 (CEST)
- Postal code: DK-7080 Børkop

Brejning is a railway town in Vejle Municipality, Region of Southern Denmark in Denmark, with a population of 3,149 (1 January 2026). It is located at the southern shore of Vejle Fjord 3 km northeast of Børkop.

Brejning is located at the Fredericia–Aarhus railway line and is served by Brejning railway station.

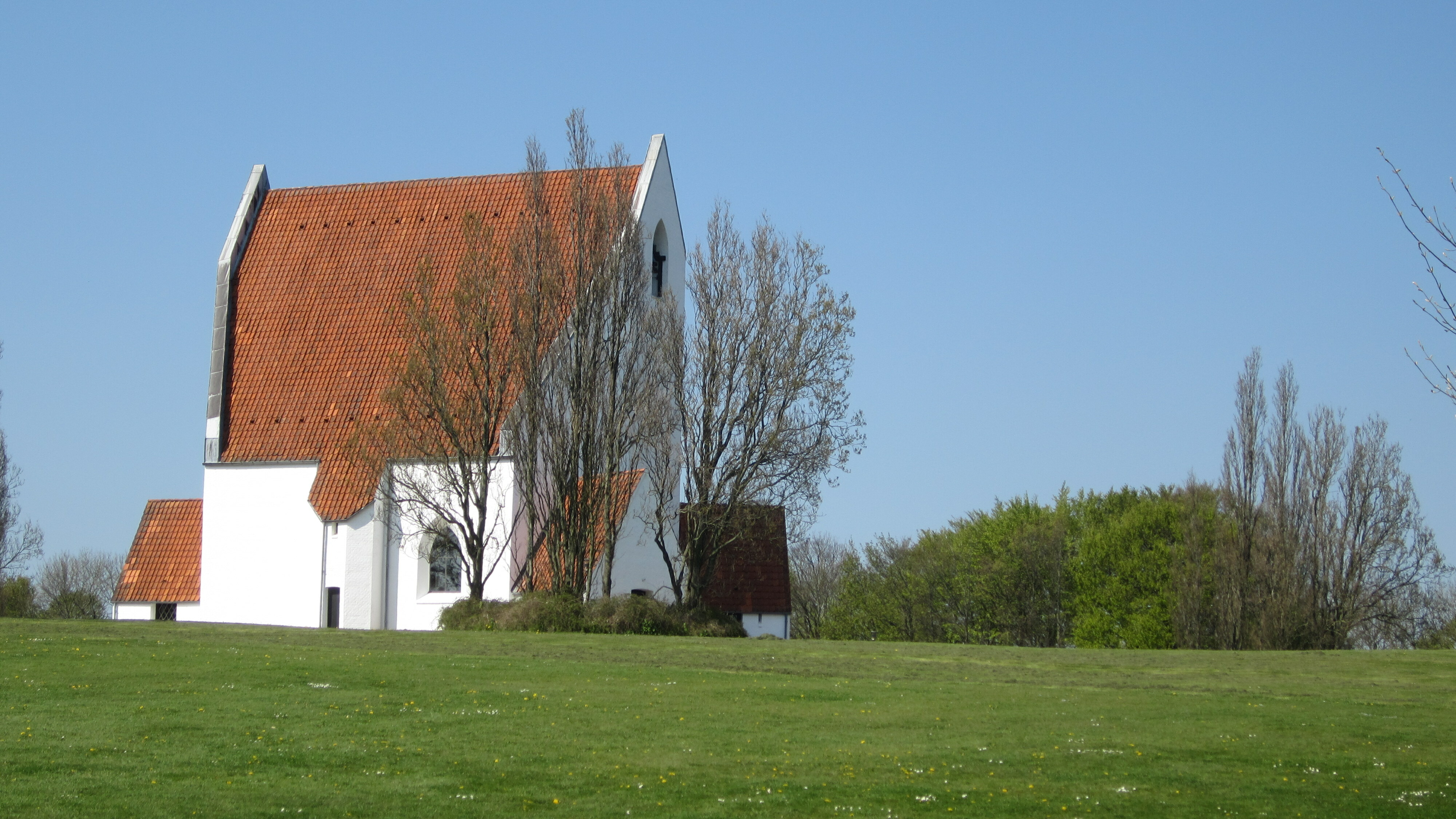
Brejning Church

Brejning Church, designed in 1941 by architect Mogens Koch, was inaugurated in 1967 as an affiliated church in Gauerslund Parish. The parish church, Gauerslund Church, is located in the small village of Gauerslund about 2 km to the southwest between Brejning and Børkop.

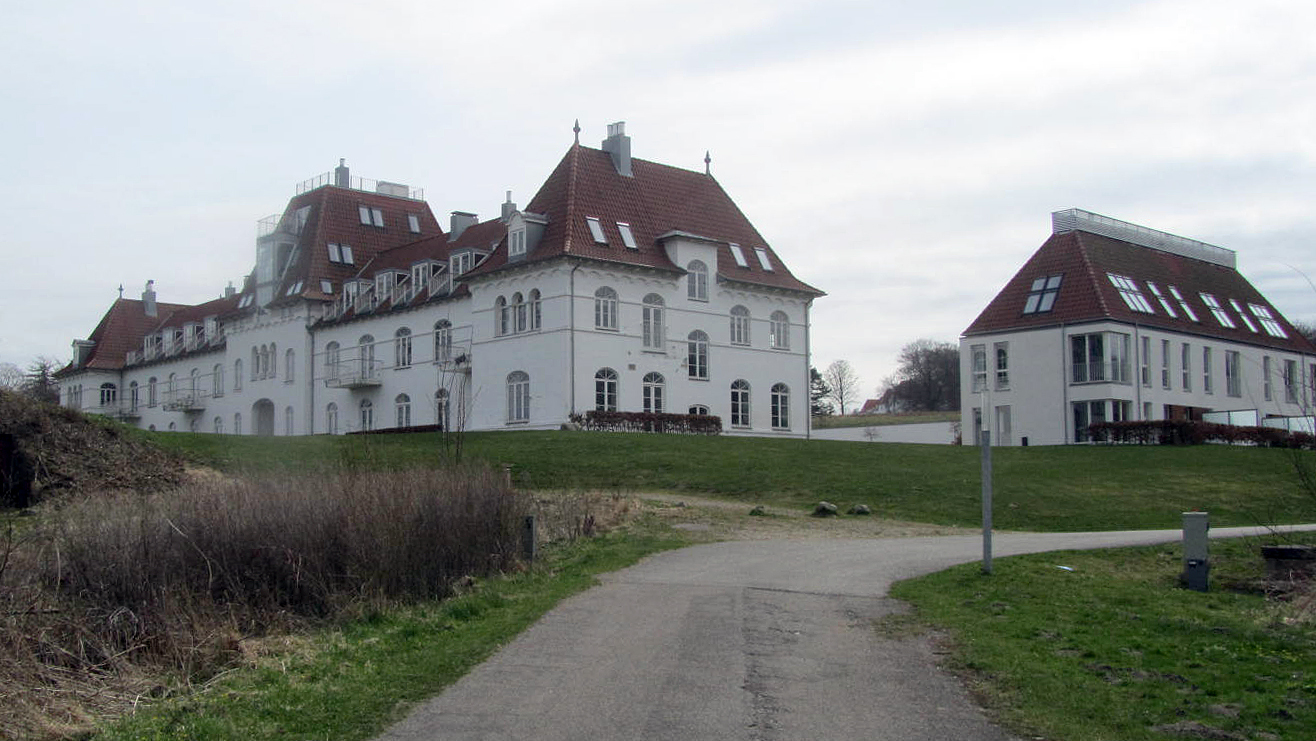
The former headquarters of The Keller Institutions

Kellers Park, an area on the northeastern outskirts of Brejning close to Vejle Fjord, is the location of the former headquarters of The Keller Institutions (De Kellerske Anstalter) for the mentally disabled, from 1899 to 1990. The premises is now converted into owner-occupied apartments, a hotel, a museum and an efterskole (continuation school).
