= Nicolaus Hinrich Rieman =

Danish architect

- Born: Unknown; Germany
- Died: 28 June 1759; Bidstrup, Denmark
- Occupation: Architect

Nicolaus Hinrich Rieman (died 1759) was an architect and master builder in Denmark during the 1700s. Rieman's background is not known but he may originally have been from Mecklenburg, Germany. On 25 June 1726 a great fire destroyed large parts of Viborg and many German builders and architects moved to Jutland in the aftermath seeking employment and Rieman may have been one of these. Unlike most master builders at the time Rieman made plans for many projects without being directly involved in the construction or renovation process.

Rieman opened a successful architect's practice which designed works from Skagen in the north to Trøjborg Manor at Tønder in the south. Rieman renovated and expanded Engelsholm Castle in the late 1730s and by the 1740s Rieman's practice was well established and he was commissioned for the extensive renovation of Aarhus Cathedral in 1743-44. In 1744 he constructed Lichtenbergs Palæ in Horsens, in 1748-51 the north wing of Gammel Estrup Manor and in the 1750s Østergård Manor in Fjellerup. Rieman renovated a total of 14 churches in the Barony of Scheel on Djursland.

Rieman's works are known for arched baroque style gables and onion domes.
