= Engelsholm Castle =

Manor house in Vejle Municipality, Denmark

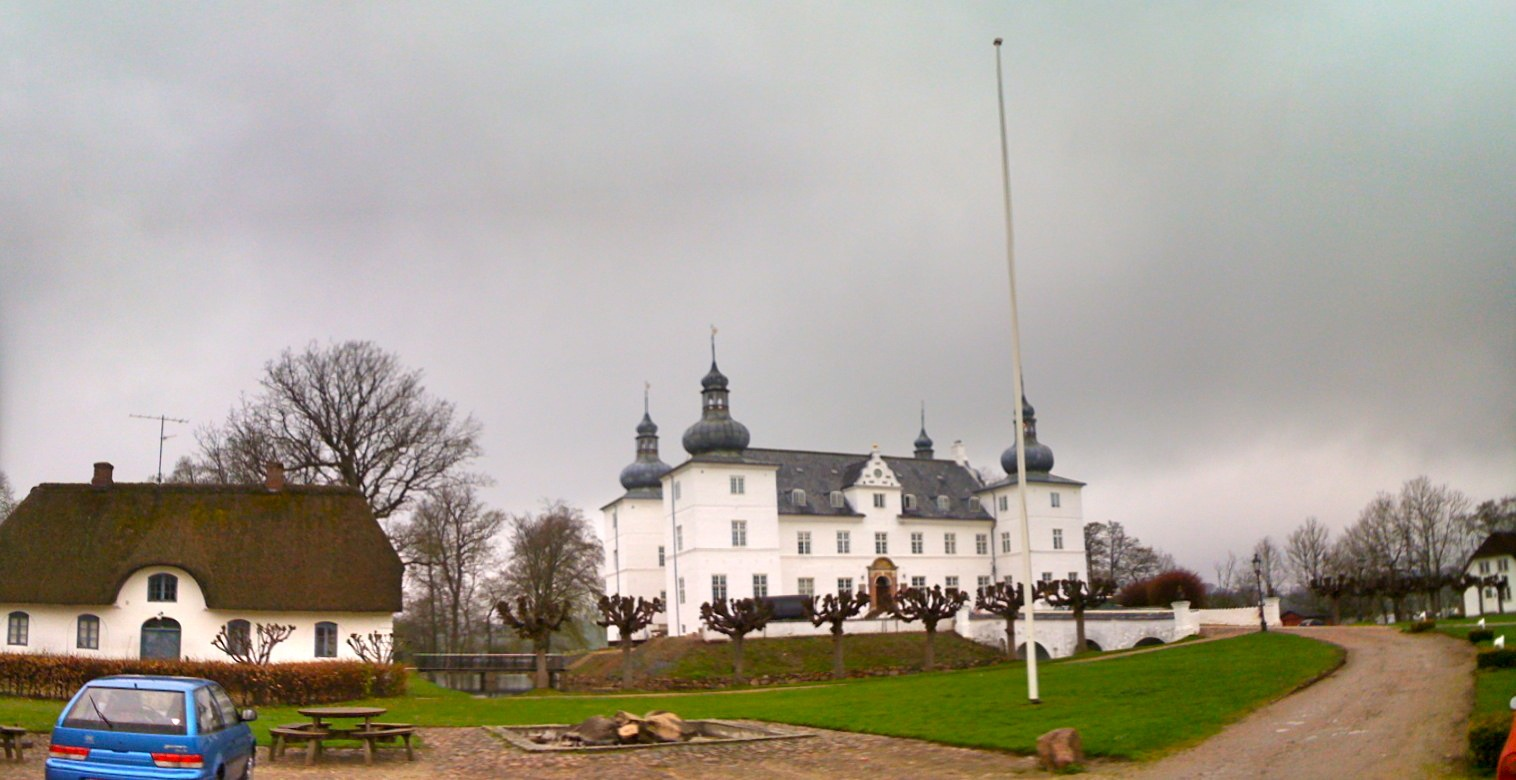
- Engelsholm
- Interactive map of the Engelsholm Castle area

General information
- Location: Vejle Municipality, Denmark
- Coordinates: 55°42′57.52″N 09°19′6.24″E
- Construction started: 1592-93
- Renovated: c. 1740

Engelsholm Castle, overlooking Engelsholm Lake, is located 14 km west of Vejle in south-western Denmark. Originally a manor house which traces its history back to the 15th century, it now houses a folk high school.

== History ==
Little is known about Engelsholm's earliest history. The estate was acquired from the crown by Timme Nielsen Rosenkrantz in 1452. It was owned by the Brahe family between 1590 and 1725. Knud Brahe, the brother of famous astronomer Tycho Brahe, constructed a new main building, in two storeys and with four corner towers, in 1592-93. The identity of the architect remains unclear but it may have been Hans van Steenwinckel the Elder or Hercules von Oberberg.

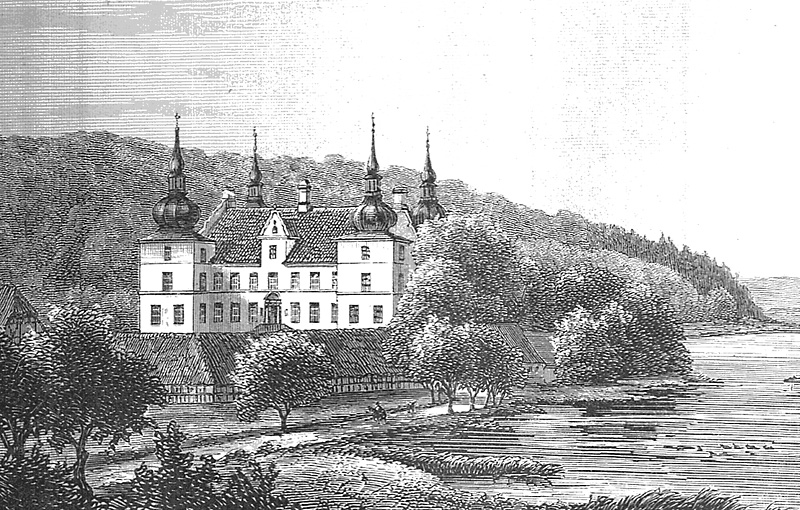
Engelsholm on drawing from 1879

This Renaissance castle was adapted to the Baroque style for Gerhard de Lichtenberg with the assistance of Nicolaus Hinrich Rieman. By 1740 it was a white-washed building with a black-glazed tile roof and onion domes topping the four towers.

Engelsholm's most famous former owner is Admiral Niels Juel who owned the estate from 1784 until 1786. Most of the land was sold off in lots in 1931 and the adjacent farm buildings were demolished.

== The folk high school ==
Engelsholm was purchased and turned into a folk high school in 1939, from 1952 run as a self-owning institution.

Housing for students and faculty has later been built next to the castle to a design by Jens Malling Pedersen (b. 1920). The school specializes in artistic courses, combining both music and visual arts.
