= Jerlev =

- Village
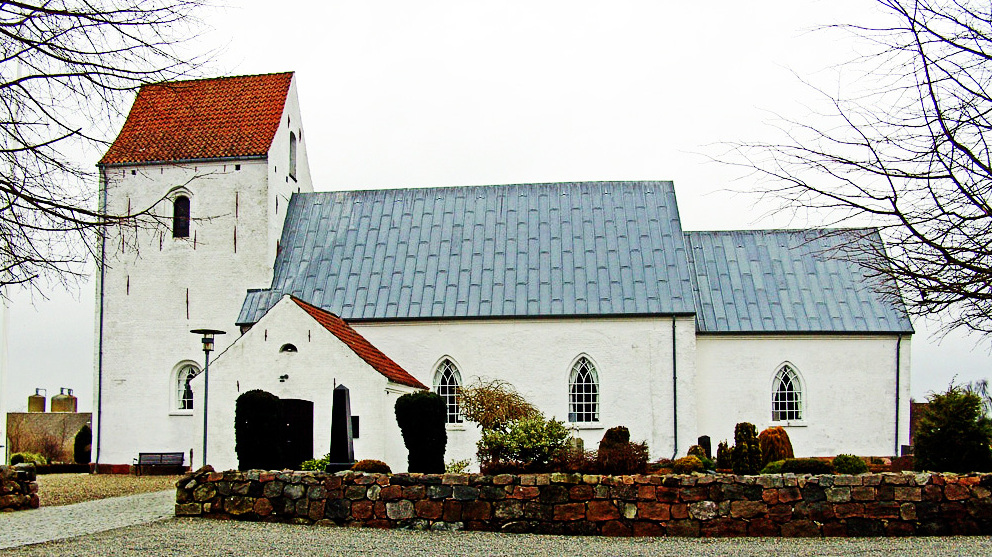
- Jerlev Church

- Location within Region of Southern Denmark Location within Denmark
- Coordinates: 55°40′22″N 9°26′9″E
- Country: Denmark
- Region: Southern Denmark
- Municipality: Vejle Municipality

Population (2026)
  - Total: 852

Jerlev is a village, with a population of 852 (1 January 2026), in Vejle Municipality, Region of Southern Denmark in Denmark. It is located 8 km southwest of Vejle.

Jerlev form an active local community, Ødsted/Jerlev Local Council, together with the neighbouring town of Ødsted 3 km to the southwest.

Jerlev Church and Jerlev Inn (Jerlev Kro) are located in the village.
