= Ødsted =

- Town
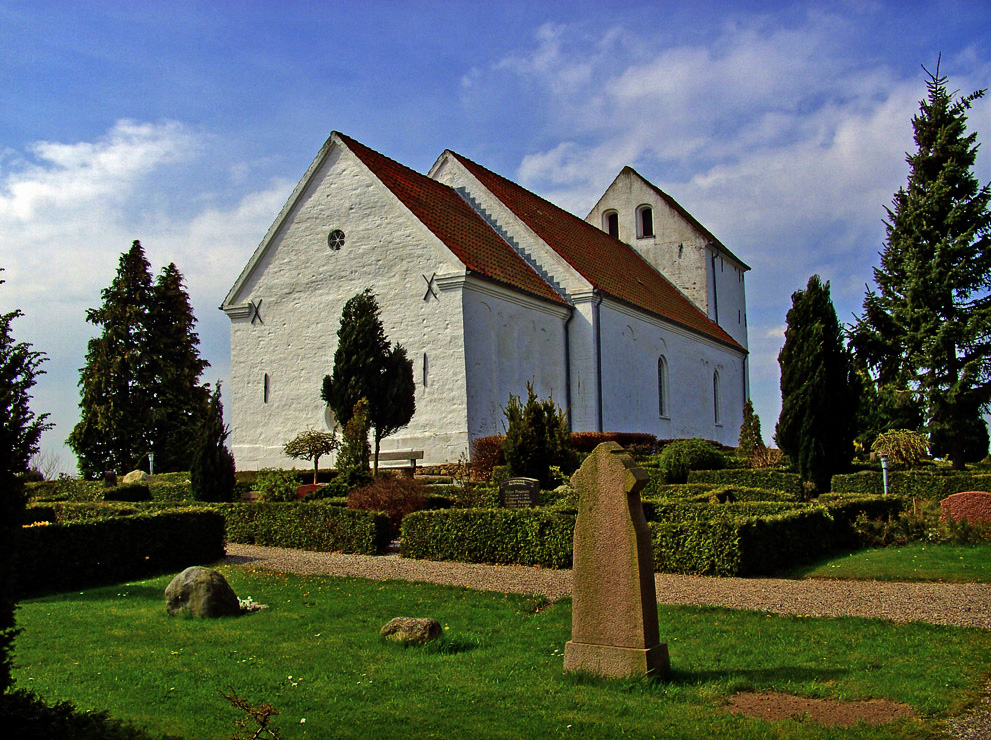
- Ødsted Church

- Location in Denmark Ødsted (Region of Southern Denmark)
- Coordinates: 55°39′29″N 9°24′5″E
- Country: Denmark
- Region: Southern Denmark
- Municipality: Vejle Municipality

Area
  - Urban: 1.1 km^{2} (0.42 sq mi)

Population (2026)
  - Urban: 1,533
  - Urban density: 1,400/km^{2} (3,600/sq mi)
- Time zone: UTC+1 (CET)
  - Summer (DST): UTC+2 (CEST)
- Postal code: DK-7100 Vejle
- Website: www.vejle.dk

Ødsted is a town, with a population of 1,533 (1 January 2026), in Vejle Municipality, Region of Southern Denmark in Denmark. It is located 11 km southwest of Vejle and 9 km northeast of Egtved.

Ødsted form an active local community, Ødsted/Jerlev Local Council, together with the neighbouring village of Jerlev 3 km to the northeast.
