= Nørup =

- Village
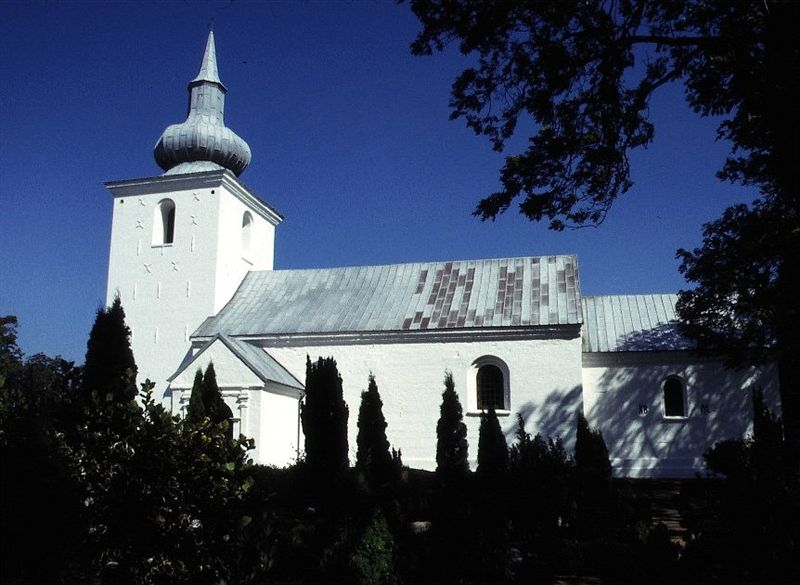
- Nørup Church

- Location in Region of Southern Denmark Nørup (Denmark)
- Coordinates: 55°43′5″N 9°18′13″E
- Country: Denmark
- Region: Southern Denmark
- Municipality: Vejle Municipality

Population (2026)
  - Total: 247

Nørup is a small village, with a population of only 247 (1 January 2026), in Vejle Municipality, Region of Southern Denmark in Denmark. It is located 6 km west of Bredsten and 17 km west of Vejle.

Nørup Church served the nearby Engelsholm Castle from 1586 to 1935, and the churchyard has several sepulchral monuments over former owners of Engelsholm.
