= Børkop =

- Town
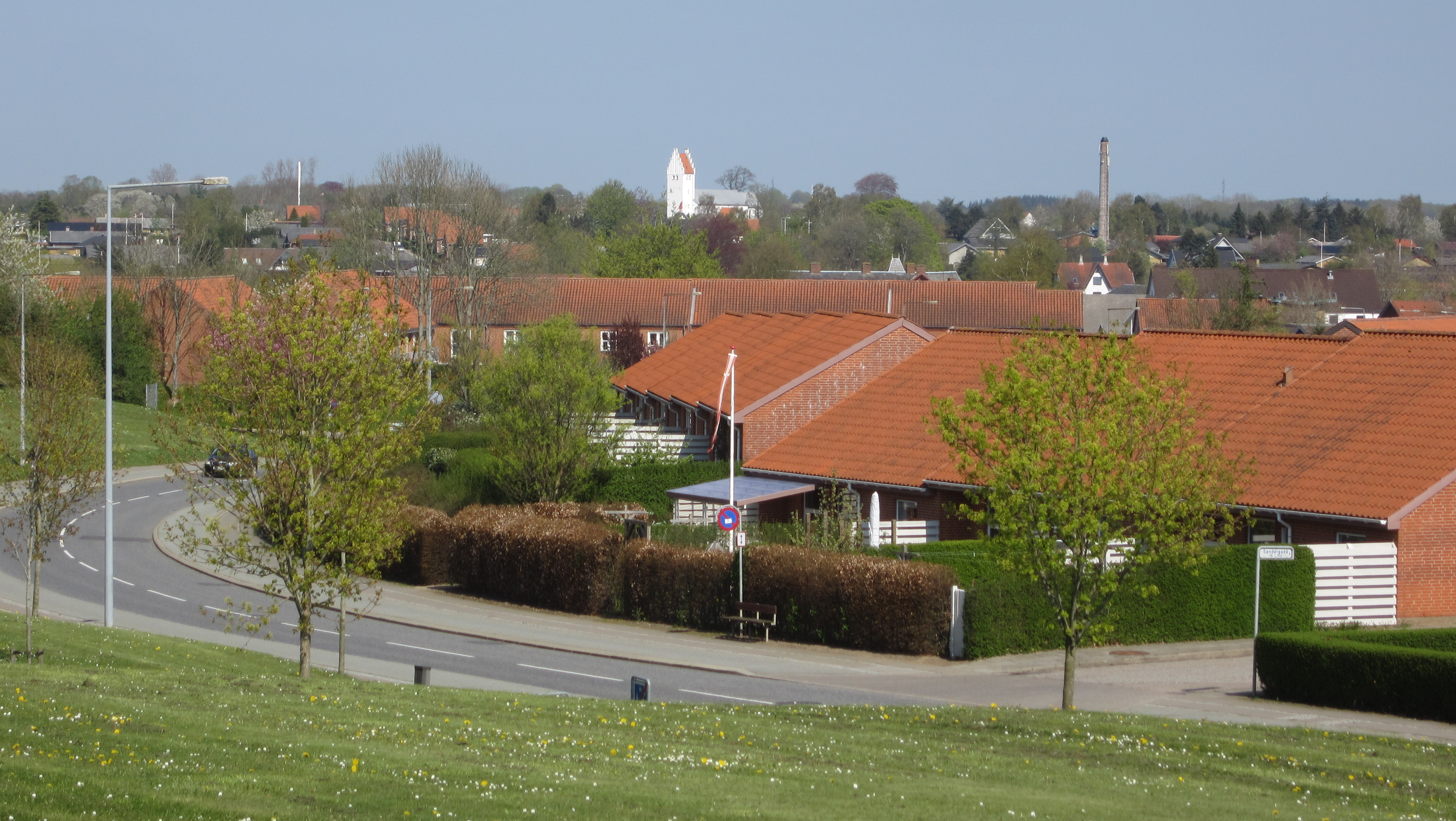
- Børkop seen from the south with Gauerslund Church in the background

- Location in Denmark Børkop (Region of Southern Denmark)
- Coordinates: 55°38′31″N 9°39′7″E
- Country: Denmark
- Region: Southern Denmark
- Municipality: Vejle Municipality
- Parish: Gauerslund Parish

Area
  - Urban: 3.8 km^{2} (1.5 sq mi)

Population (2026)
  - Urban: 6,361
  - Urban density: 1,700/km^{2} (4,300/sq mi)
  - Gender: 3,134 males and 3,227 females
- Time zone: UTC+1 (CET)
  - Summer (DST): UTC+2 (CEST)
- Postal code: DK-7080 Børkop

Børkop is a railway town in Vejle Municipality, Region of Southern Denmark in Denmark. It is located at the railroad between the cities of Vejle and Fredericia and is served by Børkop railway station. It has a population of 6,361 (1 January 2026).

Børkop was the municipal seat of the former Børkop Municipality, until 1 January 2007.

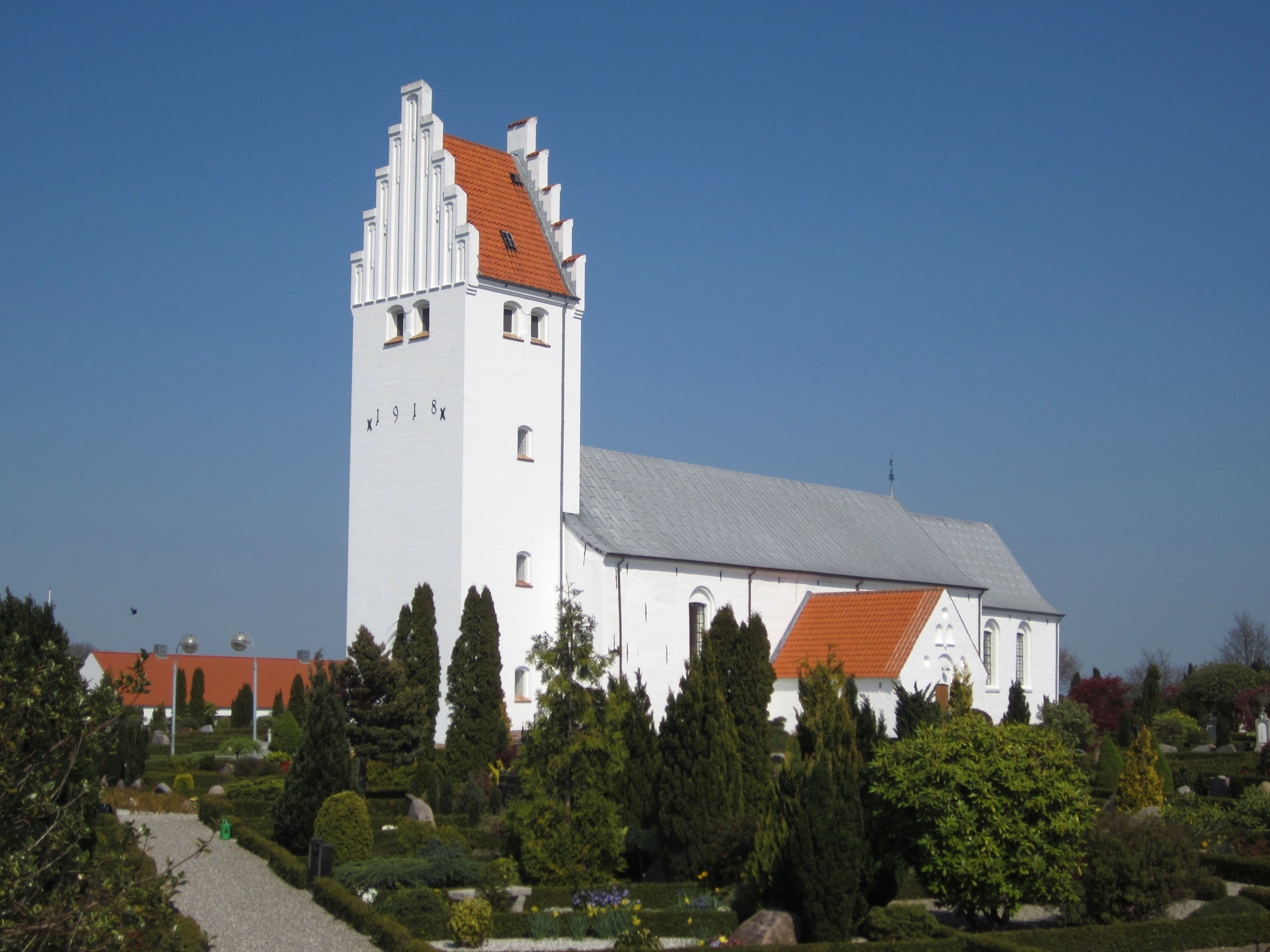
Gauerslund Church

The parish church Gauerslund Church is located about 1 km northeast of the railway station and serve as the church for both Børkop and the small village of Gauerslund.

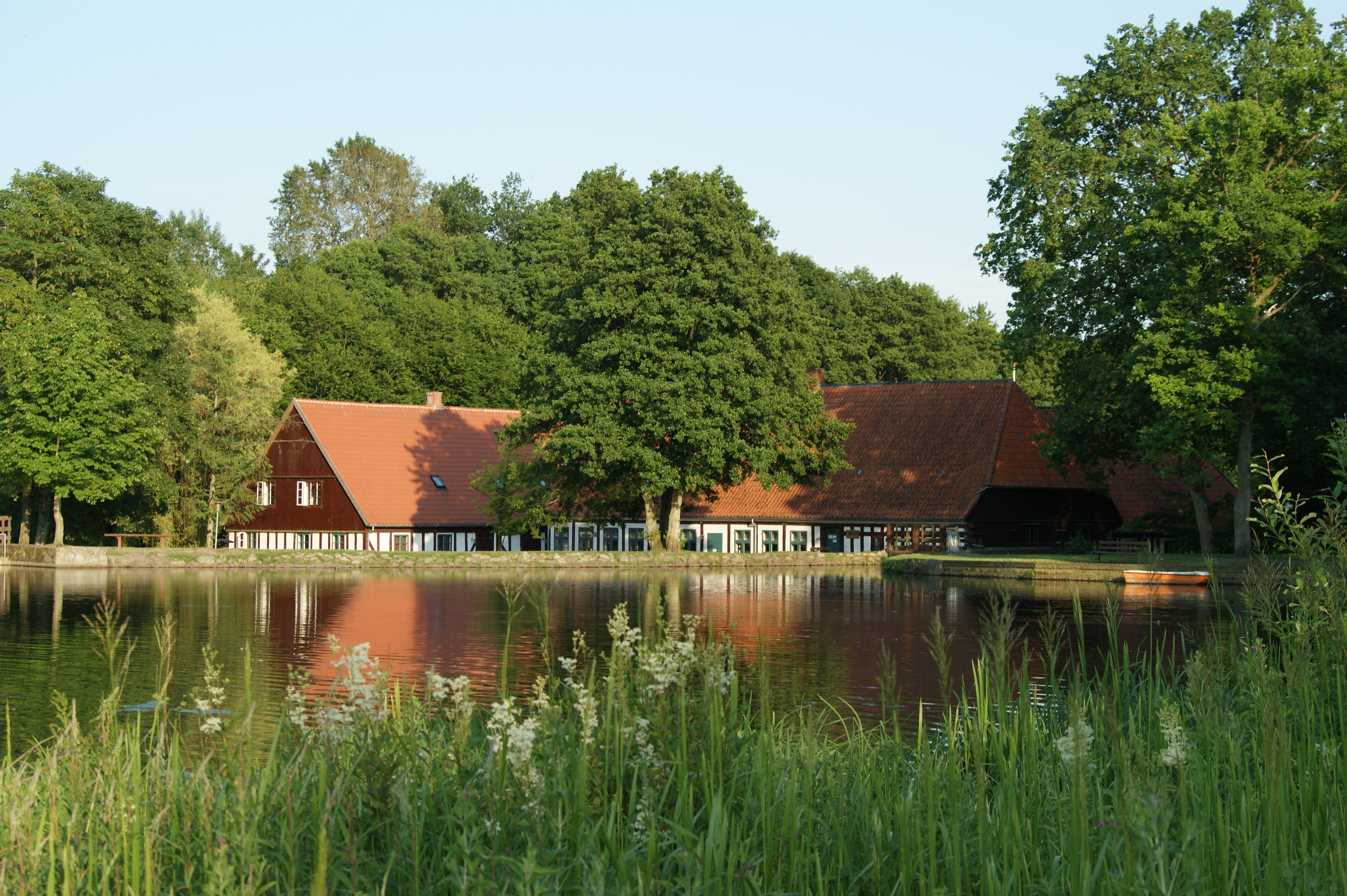
Børkop Watermill seen from the millpond

Børkop Watermill is a fully-functioning timber framed watermill, dating back to the sixteenth century, located at a small stream in the southeastern part of the town.

By exploring the area around the watermill it is possible to find one of the wooden trolls, called "Ene Øjesten", made by the artist Thomas Dambo.

Børkop Højskole, a Danish folk high school and a part of Indre Mission in Denmark, is located just north of the railway station.

== Further sources ==
- Project Runeberg - Kongeriget Danmark (J. P. Trap [1856-1906]; 2nd edition) 6. Deel. Amterne Aarhus, Vejle, Ringkjøbing, Ribe og Færøerne. Sted-Register og Supplement 272
- Danmarks Statistik: Statistisk Tabelværk Femte Række, Litra A Nr. 20: Folketællingen i Kongeriget Danmark den 5. November 1930; København 1935; p. 143
- Statistiske Undersøgelser Nr. 10: Folketal, areal og klima 1901–60; Det Statistiske Departement, København 1964; p. 185
- Statistiske Meddelelser 1968: 3. Folkemængden 27. September 1965 og Danmarks administrative inddeling; Danmarks Statistik, København 1968; p. 17
