= 2025 Hedensted municipal election =

Municipal election in Denmark

- 18 November 2025

All 27 seats to the Hedensted municipal council 14 seats needed for a majority
- Turnout: 26,887 (70.1%) ▲0.0%
	First party	Second party	Third party
	V	A	Æ
Party	Venstre	Social Democrats	Denmark Democrats
Last election	10 seats, 35.9%	9 seats, 32.9%	Did not stand
Seats won	11	7	3
Seat change	▲1	▼2	▲3
Popular vote	9,875	6,532	2,481
Percentage	37.4%	24.7%	9.4%
Swing	▲1.4%	▼8.2%	New
	Fourth party	Fifth party	Sixth party
	O	F	K
Party	Danish People's Party	Green Left	Christian Democrats
Last election	2 seats, 8.3%	1 seat, 2.4%	2 seats, 5.4%
Seats won	2	2	1
Seat change	0	▲1	▼1
Popular vote	1,829	1,511	1,346
Percentage	6.9%	5.7%	5.1%
Swing	▼1.4%	▲3.3%	▼0.3%
	Seventh party	Eighth party
	I	C
Party	Liberal Alliance	Conservatives
Last election	0 seats, 1.4%	2 seats, 5.7%
Seats won	1	0
Seat change	▲1	▼2
Popular vote	1,217	703
Percentage	4.6%	2.7%
Swing	▲3.2%	▼3.1%
Mayor before election
Ole Vind
Venstre
Mayor after election
Ole Vind
Venstre

The 2025 Hedensted Municipal election was held on November 18, 2025, to elect the 27 members to sit in the regional council for the Hedensted Municipal council, in the period of 2026 to 2029. Ole Vind from Venstre, would secure re-election.

== Background ==
Following the 2021 election, Ole Vind from Venstre became mayor for his first term. Vind sought a second a term

== Electoral system ==
For elections to Danish municipalities, a number varying from 9 to 31 are chosen to be elected to the municipal council. The seats are then allocated using the D'Hondt method and a closed list proportional representation. Hedensted Municipality had 27 seats in 2025.

== Electoral alliances ==
=== Electoral Alliance 1 ===
Party		Political alignment
C	Conservatives	Centre-right
O	Danish People's Party	Right-wing to Far-right
Æ	Denmark Democrats	Right-wing to Far-right

=== Electoral Alliance 2 ===
Party		Political alignment
F	Green Left	Centre-left to Left-wing
Ø	Red-Green Alliance	Left-wing to Far-Left
Å	The Alternative	Centre-left to Left-wing

=== Electoral Alliance 3 ===
Party		Political alignment
G	Seniorlisten Hedensted Kommune	Local politics
I	Liberal Alliance	Centre-right to Right-wing
K	Christian Democrats	Centre to Centre-right

=== Electoral Alliance 4 ===
Party		Political alignment
J	SocialKonservative	Local politics
M	Moderates	Centre to Centre-right
V	Venstre	Centre-right

== Results by polling station ==
Division	A	C	F	G	I	J	K	M	O	V	Æ	Ø	Å
Division	%	%	%	%	%	%	%	%	%	%	%	%	%
Hedensted, St.Dalby Og Urlev	27.5	3.2	6.1	0.2	6.2	0.0	4.5	0.6	6.9	35.0	7.5	2.1	0.3
Løsning Sogn	23.8	8.2	8.5	0.3	4.4	0.0	11.7	0.6	6.7	22.7	10.6	2.1	0.3
Ø. Snede Sogn	10.4	1.7	4.3	0.3	5.4	0.1	23.2	0.3	5.1	31.5	16.5	1.0	0.3
Daugård Og Ørum Sogne	31.8	1.6	4.6	0.1	5.4	0.0	10.4	1.1	8.4	27.5	6.2	2.5	0.4
Korning Sogn	9.7	1.1	3.4	0.0	4.9	0.0	4.3	0.9	5.1	60.0	8.3	1.7	0.6
Ølsted Og Eriknauer-Området	42.5	3.1	5.3	0.0	6.4	0.0	1.8	0.4	9.1	21.0	8.1	2.0	0.3
Juelsminde/Klakring	28.4	2.4	6.1	0.1	2.6	0.8	1.1	0.8	8.0	41.7	6.1	1.6	0.3
As	24.4	2.3	8.8	0.0	3.5	0.2	1.9	0.5	4.4	42.7	9.5	1.9	0.0
Barrit	20.2	2.1	7.5	0.0	4.0	0.3	2.7	0.5	6.3	41.9	12.6	1.5	0.5
Bjerre	18.7	1.3	5.3	0.0	3.6	0.5	1.5	0.5	7.1	45.5	13.1	1.9	1.0
Hornsyld	30.5	2.3	4.9	0.3	5.4	0.2	2.3	4.3	7.7	30.0	9.6	2.5	0.1
Stouby	18.6	2.1	7.2	0.0	3.7	0.1	4.5	0.5	5.8	45.2	8.3	3.9	0.3
Rårup	18.2	2.1	8.2	0.1	3.9	0.9	2.6	1.3	8.9	35.3	14.8	3.6	0.1
Glud	24.5	2.9	6.0	0.1	3.5	0.4	1.0	0.7	6.3	40.8	10.1	3.5	0.3
Hjarnø	21.9	2.7	8.2	0.0	6.8	1.4	1.4	6.8	1.4	32.9	1.4	13.7	1.4
Rask Mølle	23.6	1.2	6.1	0.2	5.2	0.0	3.7	0.1	7.2	41.9	9.3	1.4	0.0
Hvirring	23.5	0.0	5.1	0.0	8.6	0.0	4.3	2.0	9.4	30.6	13.7	2.0	0.8
Hornborg	19.4	1.7	7.4	0.0	6.6	0.0	3.7	0.5	11.1	34.2	11.5	3.4	0.5
Lindved	10.8	0.8	2.7	0.0	3.5	0.0	11.7	0.2	5.1	56.7	6.9	1.6	0.0
Tørring	29.5	2.2	3.6	0.8	5.4	0.0	2.8	1.2	6.5	33.5	12.8	1.7	0.1
Uldum	48.0	0.7	3.0	0.0	1.8	0.0	1.8	0.4	8.5	28.4	6.6	0.7	0.2
Aale	11.4	1.0	3.4	0.0	3.2	0.0	0.2	0.8	5.0	62.9	9.2	2.2	0.6
Ølholm	10.8	0.7	3.6	0.5	2.2	0.0	2.3	0.9	4.1	63.3	8.5	3.1	0.0
Hjortsvang	14.3	0.8	5.6	0.8	5.2	0.0	1.2	0.4	8.3	43.7	17.1	2.8	0.0

== Results ==
Party		Votes	%	+/-	Seats	+/-
Hedensted Municipality
V	Venstre	9,875	37.35	+1.42	11	+1
A	Social Democrats	6,532	24.71	-8.19	7	-2
Æ	Denmark Democrats	2,481	9.38	New	3	New
O	Danish People's Party	1,829	6.92	-1.37	2	0
F	Green Left	1,511	5.72	+3.28	2	+1
K	Christian Democrats	1,346	5.09	-0.27	1	-1
I	Liberal Alliance	1,217	4.60	+3.25	1	+1
C	Conservatives	703	2.66	-3.06	0	-2
Ø	Red-Green Alliance	563	2.13	+0.25	0	0
M	Moderates	216	0.82	New	0	New
Å	The Alternative	70	0.26	+0.04	0	0
J	SocialKonservative	47	0.18	+0.06	0	0
G	Seniorlisten Hedensted Kommune	46	0.17	New	0	New
Total		26,436	100	N/A	27	N/A
Invalid votes		81	0.21	-0.06		
Blank votes		370	0.96	+0.29		
Turnout		26,887	70.06	+0.04		
Source: valg.dk

== Opinion polls ==
Polling firm	Fieldwork date	Sample size	V	A	O	C	K	F	Ø	I	Å	G	J	M	Æ	Others	Lead
Epinion	4 Sep - 13 Oct 2025	485	31.4	22.9	10.8	2.5	–	5.9	3.0	6.2	0.7	–	–	2.2	10.5	3.8	8.5
2024 european parliament election	9 Jun 2024		21.6	14.1	8.6	10.9	–	10.0	2.3	8.0	1.3	–	–	6.4	12.8	–	7.5
2022 general election	1 Nov 2022		18.5	25.4	2.7	4.3	1.7	4.1	1.8	9.6	1.2	–	–	9.0	13.9	–	6.9
2021 regional election	16 Nov 2021		31.5	29.0	7.9	9.4	5.4	3.2	2.9	1.7	0.3	–	–	–	–	–	2.5
2021 municipal election	16 Nov 2021		35.9 (10)	32.9 (9)	8.3 (2)	5.7 (2)	5.4 (2)	2.4 (1)	1.9 (0)	1.4 (0)	0.2 (0)	–	–	–	–	–	3.0
