= 2021 Hedensted municipal election =

| ← 2017 | 16 November 2021 | 2025 → |

All 27 seats to the Hedensted Municipal Council 14 seats needed for a majority
- Turnout: 25,789 (70.0%) ▼5.1pp
| | First party | Second party | Third party |
|---|---|---|---|
| | V | A | O |
| Party | Venstre | Social Democrats | Danish People's Party |
| Last election | 12 seats, 39.9% | 8 seats, 27.8% | 4 seats, 16.5% |
| Seats won | 10 | 9 | 2 |
| Seat change | ▼2 | ▲1 | ▼2 |
| Popular vote | 9133 | 8,361 | 2,106 |
| Percentage | 35.9% | 32.9% | 8.3% |
| Swing | ▼4.0% | ▲5.1% | ▼8.2% |
| | Fourth party | Fifth party | Sixth party |
| | C | K | D |
| Party | Conservatives | Christian Democrats | New Right |
| Last election | 0 seats, 1.5% | 1 seat, 4.4% | Did Not Stand |
| Seats won | 2 | 2 | 1 |
| Seat change | ▲2 | ▲1 | ▲1 |
| Popular vote | 1,454 | 1362 | 1,060 |
| Percentage | 5.7% | 5.4% | 4.2% |
| Swing | ▲4.2% | ▲1.0% | New |
| | Seventh party | Eighth party |
| | F | I |
| Party | Green Left | Liberal Alliance |
| Last election | 1 seat, 3.9% | 1 seat, 1.8% |
| Seats won | 1 | 0 |
| Seat change | 0 | ▼1 |
| Popular vote | 618 | 344 |
| Percentage | 2.4% | 1.4% |
| Swing | ▼1.5% | ▼0.4% |
Mayor before election
Kasper Glyngø
Social Democrats
Mayor after election
Ole Vind
Venstre

Following the 2017 election an untraditional alliance consisting of the Social Democrats, the Green Left, the Christian Democrats and Danish People's Party supported Kasper Glyngø from the Social Democrats as mayor.

However, despite the parties receiving a seat majority again in this election, the Christian Democrats and Danish People's Party would support Ole Vind from Venstre as mayor.

== Electoral system ==
For elections to Danish municipalities, a number varying from 9 to 31 are chosen to be elected to the municipal council. The seats are then allocated using the D'Hondt method and a closed list proportional representation. Hedensted Municipality had 27 seats in 2021

Unlike in Danish General Elections, in elections to municipal councils, electoral alliances are allowed.

== Electoral alliances ==
=== Electoral Alliance 1 ===
| Party | | Political alignment |
|---|---|---|
| A | Social Democrats | Centre-left |
| O | Danish People's Party | Right-wing to Far-right |

=== Electoral Alliance 2 ===
| Party | | Political alignment |
|---|---|---|
| C | Conservatives | Centre-right |
| D | New Right | Right-wing to Far-right |
| I | Liberal Alliance | Centre-right to Right-wing |

=== Electoral Alliance 3 ===
| Party | | Political alignment |
|---|---|---|
| B | Social Liberals | Centre to Centre-left |
| E | Elevatorlisten | Local politics |
| K | Christian Democrats | Centre to Centre-right |
| M | SocialKonservative | Local politics |

=== Electoral Alliance 4 ===
| Party | | Political alignment |
|---|---|---|
| F | Green Left | Centre-left to Left-wing |
| Ø | Red–Green Alliance | Left-wing to Far-Left |
| Å | The Alternative | Centre-left to Left-wing |

== Results by polling station ==
E = Elevatorlisten
M = SocialKonservative

| Division | A | B | C | D | E | F | I | K | M | O | V | Ø | Å |
| Division | % | % | % | % | % | % | % | % | % | % | % | % | % |
|---|---|---|---|---|---|---|---|---|---|---|---|---|---|
| Hedensted, St.Dalby Og Urlev | 30.6 | 2.6 | 7.0 | 3.5 | 0.1 | 1.8 | 2.0 | 5.7 | 0.1 | 7.3 | 37.8 | 1.4 | 0.1 |
| Løsning Sogn | 36.3 | 1.6 | 12.7 | 4.6 | 0.0 | 1.9 | 0.7 | 11.5 | 0.0 | 7.5 | 21.8 | 1.5 | 0.0 |
| Ø. Snede Sogn | 16.1 | 1.3 | 3.9 | 5.3 | 0.2 | 1.2 | 1.7 | 15.6 | 0.3 | 6.4 | 47.3 | 0.4 | 0.5 |
| Daugård Og Ørum Sogne | 36.0 | 1.3 | 6.0 | 5.2 | 0.1 | 2.6 | 2.1 | 10.4 | 0.0 | 7.5 | 27.0 | 1.5 | 0.3 |
| As | 41.1 | 0.6 | 6.1 | 4.2 | 0.4 | 1.7 | 2.5 | 1.5 | 0.6 | 7.2 | 32.0 | 2.1 | 0.0 |
| Juelsminde/Klakring | 48.7 | 0.7 | 5.2 | 2.9 | 1.4 | 2.1 | 0.9 | 2.6 | 0.2 | 6.8 | 26.8 | 1.6 | 0.1 |
| Ølsted Og Eriknauer-Området | 48.6 | 0.4 | 6.9 | 7.2 | 0.1 | 0.7 | 1.0 | 1.4 | 0.1 | 7.0 | 24.4 | 2.1 | 0.0 |
| Korning Sogn | 12.0 | 1.4 | 3.0 | 4.1 | 0.0 | 1.9 | 0.8 | 5.7 | 0.0 | 7.9 | 61.3 | 1.4 | 0.5 |
| Barrit | 34.0 | 1.0 | 2.8 | 6.1 | 0.6 | 4.1 | 0.6 | 2.1 | 0.0 | 6.9 | 38.4 | 3.0 | 0.6 |
| Bjerre | 26.3 | 0.7 | 5.5 | 4.7 | 0.1 | 4.2 | 1.0 | 1.4 | 0.4 | 8.8 | 43.1 | 2.9 | 0.9 |
| Hornsyld | 38.1 | 1.2 | 6.5 | 3.4 | 0.2 | 3.3 | 1.6 | 1.6 | 0.2 | 7.4 | 34.6 | 2.0 | 0.0 |
| Stouby | 25.0 | 1.5 | 3.2 | 3.8 | 0.0 | 4.4 | 1.4 | 5.2 | 0.0 | 5.3 | 46.4 | 3.1 | 0.5 |
| Rask Mølle | 34.5 | 0.8 | 2.4 | 3.6 | 0.0 | 2.2 | 1.0 | 3.4 | 0.0 | 11.8 | 39.0 | 1.1 | 0.2 |
| Hjarnø | 28.8 | 2.7 | 2.7 | 2.7 | 0.0 | 11.0 | 4.1 | 1.4 | 0.0 | 1.4 | 31.5 | 12.3 | 1.4 |
| Glud | 31.0 | 1.1 | 4.8 | 4.3 | 0.2 | 4.1 | 1.0 | 1.3 | 0.2 | 7.8 | 41.4 | 2.4 | 0.2 |
| Rårup | 30.0 | 1.2 | 5.8 | 6.1 | 0.0 | 4.3 | 2.2 | 1.7 | 0.8 | 14.3 | 29.4 | 3.9 | 0.4 |
| Hvirring | 23.6 | 3.4 | 3.0 | 5.6 | 0.0 | 3.9 | 1.7 | 3.4 | 0.0 | 14.6 | 37.8 | 2.6 | 0.4 |
| Hornborg | 26.0 | 0.7 | 4.4 | 6.8 | 0.0 | 4.7 | 1.9 | 4.7 | 0.0 | 12.9 | 33.7 | 3.7 | 0.5 |
| Lindved | 21.0 | 1.6 | 3.8 | 4.3 | 0.2 | 1.8 | 0.9 | 13.7 | 0.0 | 9.2 | 41.9 | 1.5 | 0.0 |
| Tørring | 29.6 | 0.9 | 5.2 | 3.2 | 0.1 | 2.3 | 1.2 | 4.0 | 0.0 | 13.4 | 37.9 | 2.1 | 0.1 |
| Hjortsvang | 23.8 | 1.6 | 3.6 | 3.2 | 0.4 | 3.2 | 0.4 | 1.6 | 0.0 | 10.5 | 46.0 | 4.4 | 1.2 |
| Ølholm | 25.4 | 0.9 | 4.6 | 3.7 | 0.0 | 2.0 | 1.5 | 3.5 | 0.0 | 10.8 | 46.6 | 0.9 | 0.0 |
| Aale | 16.2 | 0.2 | 2.4 | 4.1 | 0.0 | 0.9 | 1.1 | 1.1 | 0.2 | 8.4 | 63.9 | 1.3 | 0.2 |
| Uldum | 55.0 | 0.7 | 3.1 | 3.9 | 0.0 | 1.1 | 0.5 | 3.8 | 0.0 | 6.6 | 23.9 | 1.4 | 0.1 |

== Results ==
| Party | | Votes | % | +/- | Seats | +/- |
Hedensted Municipality
| V | Venstre | 9,133 | 35.94 | -3.93 | 10 | -2 |
| A | Social Democrats | 8,361 | 32.90 | +5.05 | 9 | +1 |
| O | Danish People's Party | 2,106 | 8.29 | -8.24 | 2 | -2 |
| C | Conservatives | 1,454 | 5.72 | +4.18 | 2 | +2 |
| K | Christian Democrats | 1,362 | 5.36 | +1.01 | 2 | +1 |
| D | New Right | 1,060 | 4.17 | New | 1 | New |
| F | Green Left | 618 | 2.43 | -1.48 | 1 | 0 |
| Ø | Red-Green Alliance | 478 | 1.88 | -0.17 | 0 | 0 |
| B | Social Liberals | 348 | 1.37 | +0.22 | 0 | 0 |
| I | Liberal Alliance | 344 | 1.35 | -0.43 | 0 | -1 |
| E | Elevatorlisten | 62 | 0.24 | New | 0 | New |
| Å | The Alternative | 56 | 0.22 | -0.74 | 0 | 0 |
| M | SocialKonservative | 31 | 0.12 | New | 0 | New |
| Total | | 25,413 | 100 | N/A | 27 | N/A |
| Invalid votes | | 100 | 0.27 | +0.05 | | |
| Blank votes | | 276 | 0.75 | +0.09 | | |
| Turnout | | 25,789 | 70.01 | -5.07 | | |
Source: valg.dk
