= Bråskov =

- Village
- Location in Central Denmark Region Bråskov (Denmark)
- Coordinates: 55°45′35″N 9°49′35″E
- Country: Denmark
- Region: Central Denmark Region
- Municipality: Hedensted Municipality

Area
  - Urban: 0.26 km^{2} (0.10 sq mi)

Population (2026)
  - Urban: 201
  - Urban density: 770/km^{2} (2,000/sq mi)
- Time zone: UTC+1 (CET)
  - Summer (DST): UTC+2 (CEST)

Bråskov is a very small village in East Jutland approximately 10 km (6.2 mi) from Horsens, close to Hornsyld. Bråskov is located in Hedensted Municipality and belongs to the Central Denmark Region.
