= Listed buildings in Hedensted Municipality =

Historic structures in Hedensted, Denmark

This is a list of listed buildings in Hedensted Municipality, Denmark.

== The list ==
Listing name	Image	Location	Year built	Summary	source
Bjerrevej 412		Bjerrevej 412, 7130 Juelsminde			Ref
Bjerrevej 412		Bjerrevej 412, 7130 Juelsminde			Ref
Bjerrevej 412		Bjerrevej 412, 7130 Juelsminde			Ref
Bjerre Jailhouse		Bjerrevej 353, 8783 Hornsyld			Ref
Bjerre Jailhouse		Bjerrevej 353, 8783 Hornsyld			Ref
Jensgård		Jensgårdvej 11, 7130 Juelsminde			Ref
Jensgård		Jensgårdvej 11, 7130 Juelsminde			Ref
Kalsbøl		Bjerrevej 388, 7130 Juelsminde			Ref
Kalsbøl		Bjerrevej 388, 7130 Juelsminde			Ref
Palsgård		Palsgaardvej 2B, 7130 Juelsminde			Ref
Rask Hovedgård		Fruens Vej 15, 8763 Rask Mølle			Ref
Rask Hovedgård		Fruens Vej 15, 8763 Rask Mølle			Ref
Rask Hovedgård		Fruens Vej 15, 8763 Rask Mølle			Ref
Rask Hovedgård		Fruens Vej 15, 8763 Rask Mølle			Ref
Rask Hovedgård		Fruens Vej 15, 8763 Rask Mølle			Ref
Rosenvold		Rosenvoldvej 21, 7140 Stouby			Ref
Skerrildgård		Lhombrevej 4, 8783 Hornsyld			Ref
Tønballegård		Tønballevej 1, 7130 Juelsminde			Ref
Tønballegård		Tønballevej 1, 7130 Juelsminde			Ref
Tønballegård		Tønballevej 1, 7130 Juelsminde			Ref
Williamsborg		Gl Vejlevej 2, 8721 Daugård			Ref
Åle Rectory		Aale Bygade 28, 7160 Tørring			Ref

== Delisted ==
Listing name	Image	Location	Year built	Summary	source
Snaptun Købmandsgård		Havnevej 13, 7130 Juelsminde			Ref
