= Jens Jacob Bregnø =

Danish sculptor and ceramics designer (1877–1946)

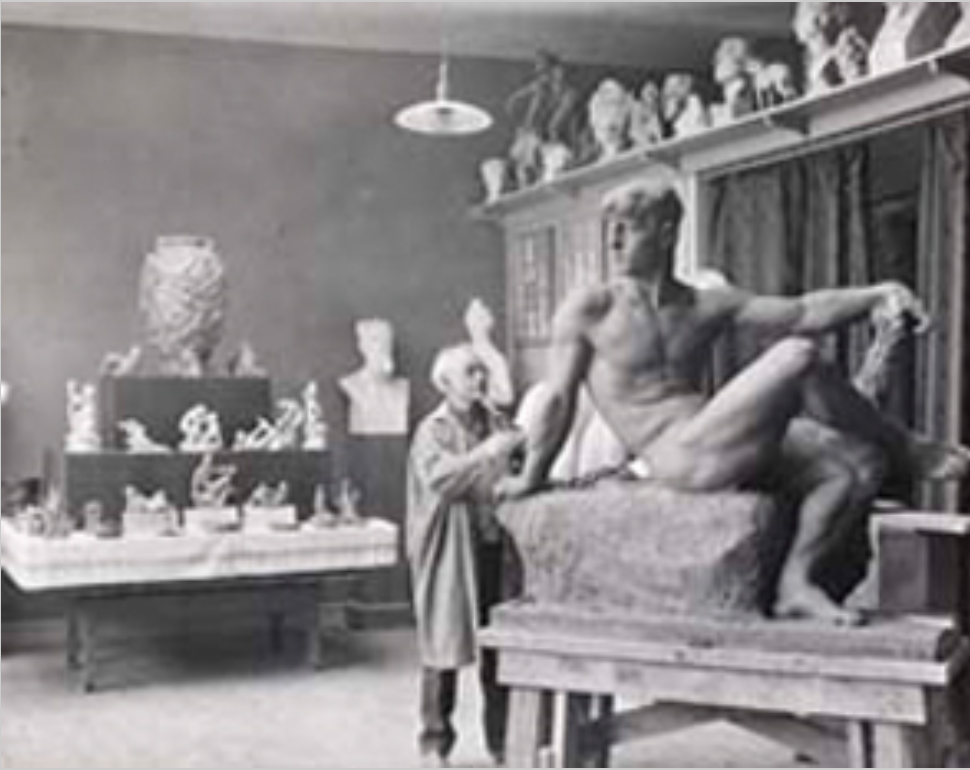
- Bregnø in his study
- Born: Jens Jacob Nielsen Bregnø; 9 February 1877; Hedensted, Denmark
- Died: 26 March 1946 (aged 69); Søborg, Denmark
- Resting place: Vestre Cemetery in Copenhagen
- Known for: Sculpting
- Awards: Eckersberg Medal (1919)

Jens Jacob Nielsen Bregnø (9 February 1877 – 26 March 1946), often referred to as J. J. Bregnø, was a Danish sculptor and ceramics designer. He collaborated with Bing & Grøndahl, Saxbo and Dahl Jensen Porcelain and also designed silver for Kay Bojesen. He received the Eckersberg Medal in 1919.

== Early life and education ==
He was born in Hedensted, near Horsens, the son of shoemaker Mads Nielsen (1843–87) and Elise Laursen (1854-31). He changed his surname to Bregnø in 1913. He initially completed an apprenticeship as a joiner and woodcarver in Aarhus and then apprenticed as a stonesmason in Stockholm from 1898. He worked as a decorative sculptor in stucco artist Hans Lamberg-Petersen's workshop in Copenhagen from 1902 to 1905 and then continued his studies in Italy, France and Germany until 1908.

== Career ==
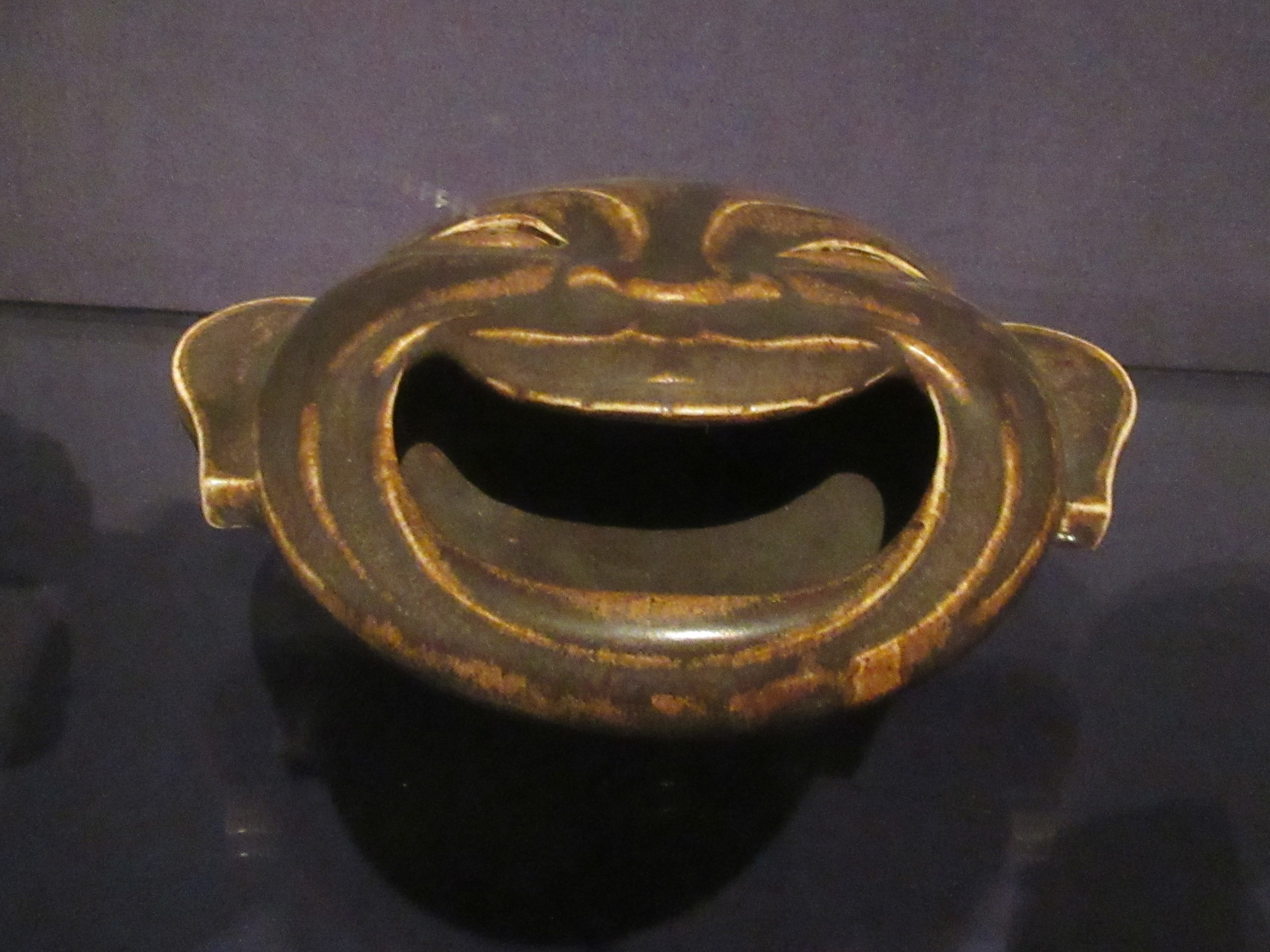
Ash tray Bregnø for Saxbo, 19930-34

From 1907 to 1911, Bregnø created a number of ceramic works that were burnt in Patrick Nordström's workshop in Islev. He later created numerous statuettes for Bing & Grøndahl in collaboration with the company's artistic director Hans Tegner. He later also worked for Dahl-Jensen and Nathalie Krebs' Saxbo.

Bregnø also created unique pieces in his own name that were burnt at different workshops, including Saxbo in Herlev and Hjorth in Rønne on Bornholm. He also designed stoneware for Saxbo and silver for Kay Bojesen.

His studio was located at Haraldsgade 18 in the Nørrebro district of Copenhagen. He was a member of Kunstforeningen af 18. November.

A Hercules sculpture by Bregnø was installed in Nørrebroparken in 1936. It has later been moved to a new site in Fælledparken. His statue The Humane Nurse, a monument to Danish nurses, was installed in front of Bispebjerg Hospital in 1941.

== Personal life ==
Bregnø joined the Danish Nazi Party on 28 August 1940. After the war he was blacklisted by former collaborators and received no commissions. He died on 26 March 1946 and is buried in Vestre Cemetery in Copenhagen.

== Selected works ==
- Danaide (1912)
- Samson (1912, Statens Museum for Kunst)
- Druepigefontæne (1929)
- Satyrdreng med en gås
- Susanne i Badet (fountain), bronze and Cementsten
- Læsende Pige ( "Poesien")
- Lyttende Pige ("Samvittigheden"), Cararamarmor
- Diana (sundial), Bronze and tax wood plinth
- Baccantinde, stoneware
- Vinhøst
- Hemmeligheden
- Moder og Barn
- Trillinger
- Firlinger
- Fad. Eva og Slangen
- Fad. Eva med Æbler
- Satyrhoved
- Geden malkes
- Anger
- Menneskepar
- Elskende Par, stoneware
- Venus og Amor
- Thor og Midgaardsormen
- Pegasus
- Lyksaligheden
- Druepigen
- Haarfletningen, rec clay
- Herkules paa Skillevejen
- Nilmoderen, bronze
- Fuglebad, stoneware
- Havhexen

=== Public art ===
- Herkules, Dyden og Lasten (1936; Nørrebroparken, later moved to Fælledparken)
- The Humane Nurse (1941, Bispebjerg Hospital)
