= Vonge =

- Village
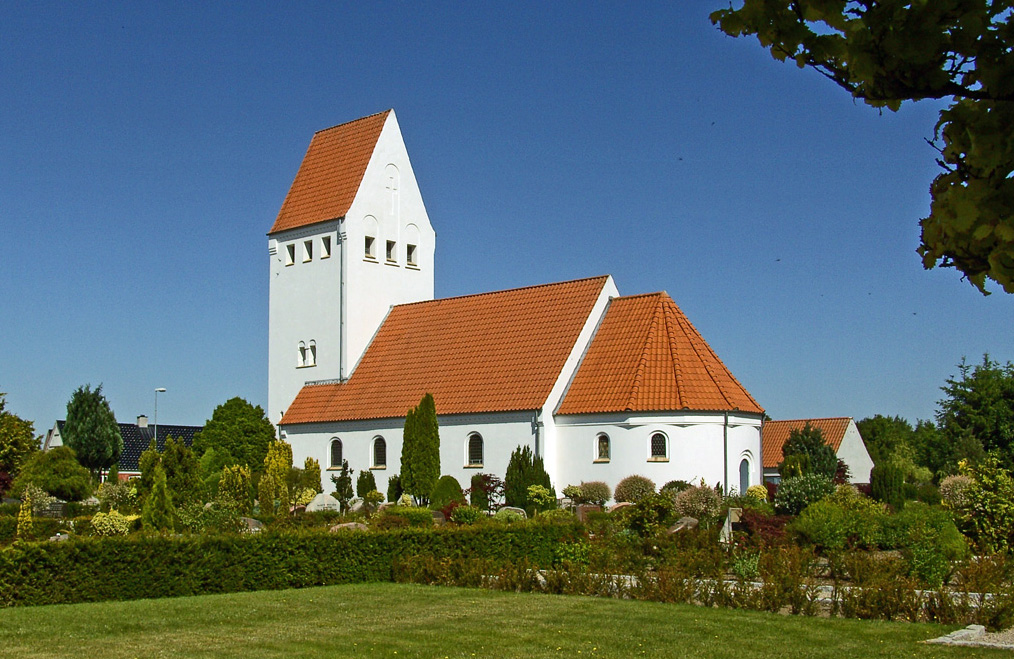
- Vonge Church

- Location in Region of Southern Denmark Vonge (Denmark)
- Coordinates: 55°51′36″N 9°25′6″E
- Country: Denmark
- Region: Southern Denmark
- Municipality: Vejle Municipality

Population (2026)
  - Total: 580

Vonge is a village, with a population of 580 (1 January 2026), in Vejle Municipality, Region of Southern Denmark in Denmark.

Vonge is located 5 km west of Tørring and 22 km northwest of Vejle.

Vonge Church is located on the southeastern outskirts of the village.
