= Løsning =

Løsning is a town in Denmark. The town is located just north of (and directly adjacent to) the town of Hedensted. Together, they form an urban area with a population of 13,562 (1 January 2026).

Geographically, Løsning lies halfway between the larger towns of Horsens and Vejle, beside the European route E45. For administrative purposes, the town is in Hedensted Municipality, Central Denmark Region.

== Sport ==
Frederikslyst Speedway was a motorcycle speedway venue located approximately 2 kilometres north east of the town, off the Frederikslystvej in the forest (55°48′47″N 9°43′23″E). It held the final of the Danish Individual Speedway Championship in 1995.
