= Poul Martin Møller =

Danish academic and poet (1794–1838)

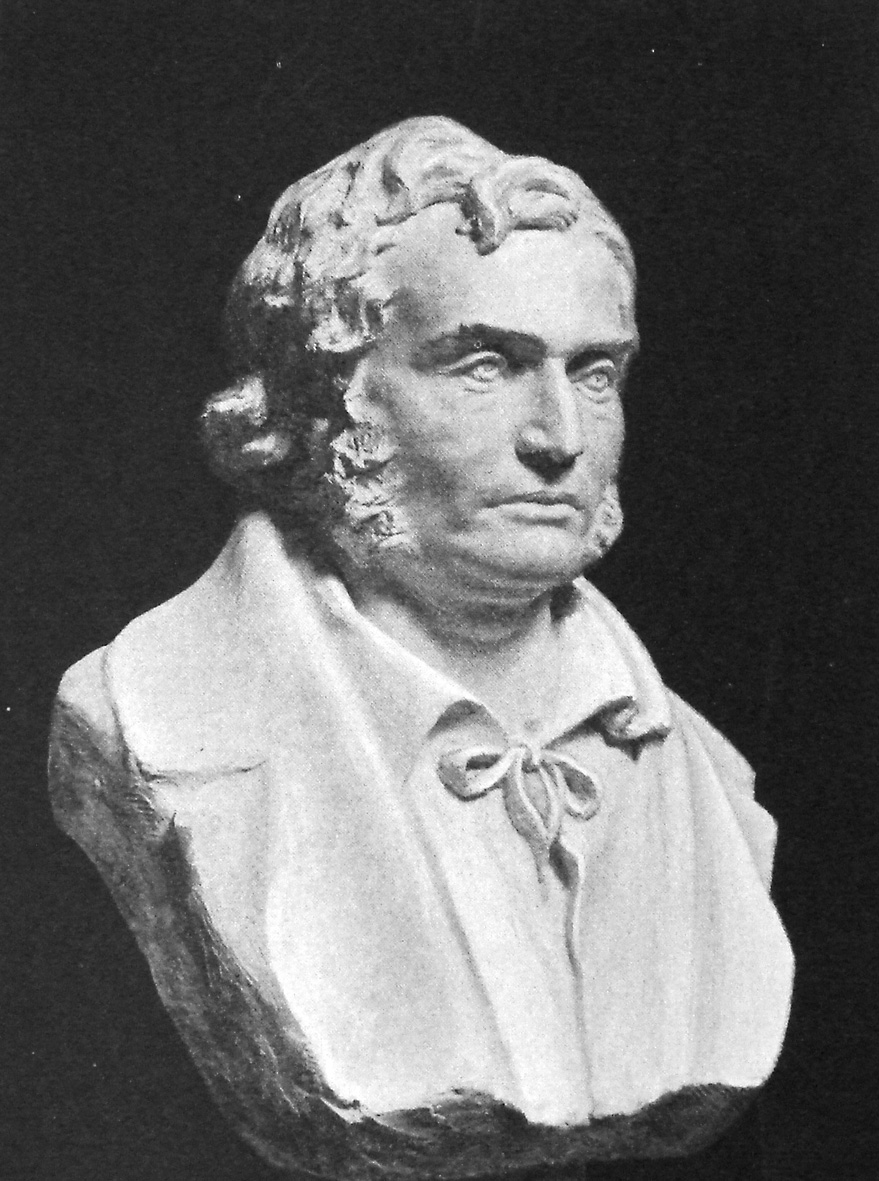
- Bust of Møller by L. Hasselriis
- Born: 21 March 1794; Uldum near Vejle, Denmark–Norway
- Died: 13 March 1838 (aged 43); Copenhagen, Denmark
- Occupations: Poet, academic

Poul Martin Møller (21 March 1794 – 13 March 1838) was a Danish academic, writer, and poet. During his lifetime, he gained renown in Denmark for his poetry. After his death, his posthumously published fiction and philosophical writings were well received. He also devoted several decades of study to classical languages and literature. While serving as a professor at the University of Copenhagen, he was a mentor to the philosopher Søren Kierkegaard.

== Life and career ==
Møller was born near Vejle and raised on the island of Lolland, where his father served as a pastor. As a young man, his father tutored him in classical languages and literature. In 1812 he enrolled in the University of Copenhagen and studied theology. He also taught religion at a nearby school during this time. He graduated as the valedictorian of his class three and a half years later. In 1815 he published his first poem. After a stint as the tutor of two young counts, he returned to Copenhagen to study classical philology. After an unsuccessful proposal of marriage to his childhood sweetheart, he left Copenhagen to serve as the pastor of a ship during its two-year journey to China. While on the journey, he read the complete works of Cicero, wrote poetry, and wrote in his journal. After returning to Copenhagen, he began teaching Greek and writing poetry and fiction. He later successfully proposed to his first wife, with whom he had four sons. From 1826 to 1832, he taught at the Royal Frederick University in Christiania. Although he rose from assistant professor to full professor, he disliked living in Norway and returned to Denmark.

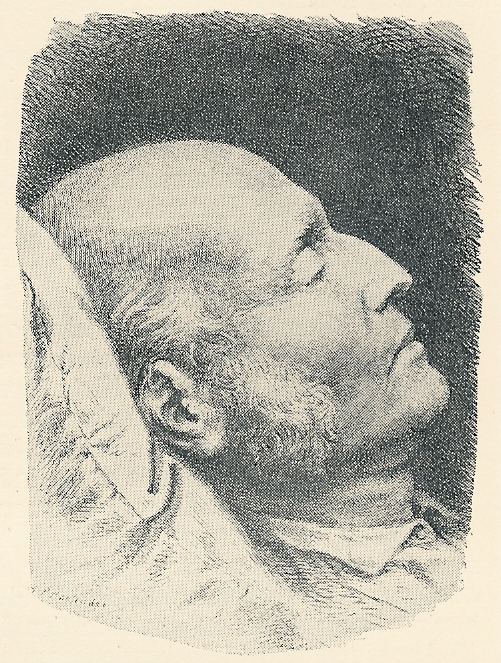
Poul Martin Møller on his deathbed. Lithography of the death mask.

Although eccentric, notoriously disheveled, and prone to becoming distracted during lessons, his good nature and pleasant disposition allowed him to become a popular teacher. In 1831, he was promoted to Professor Extraordinary at the University of Copenhagen, where he taught Hegel, classical literature, and moral philosophy. His first wife died in 1834, an event which left him shaken to the core and almost unable to function. Two years later, he married a friend of his late wife. He fathered a daughter with his second wife before succumbing to what was most likely liver cancer in March 1838.

== Writings ==
While working as a teacher he wrote extensively, working on poetry, a novel, and translating literature into Danish. He published translations of both contemporary and classical authors, including Lord Byron's "The Dream" and a portion of The Odyssey. Due to his habit of writing very slowly and later rewriting his work, he was never able to publish much of his work. The largest work that he published during his lifetime was a translation of the first six books of The Odyssey. He was most successful as a poet; his poem "Joy Over Denmark" ("Glæde over Danmark") became one of the most famous Danish poems. Though unfinished, Møller's novel Adventures of a Danish Student also gained lasting fame. It tells the comedic story of the romantic escapades of an eccentric student and his philosophical musings. Years later it became a favorite book of the Danish physicist and thinker Niels Bohr, who often quoted it during lectures. Shortly before his death, he charged his stepbrother Christian Winter and his colleague Fredrick Olsen with the task of publishing his writing posthumously. Although Møller's unfocused nature made this a difficult task, they were eventually able to publish nine volumes by 1850. After these volumes were published, Møller's reputation greatly improved among the Danish public. However, only a small portion of his philosophical writings were able to be published.

== Relationship with Kierkegaard ==
Møller is perhaps best known for relationship with Søren Kierkegaard. They first met when Møller was teaching at the University of Copenhagen and they also lived in the same square in Copenhagen from 1836 to 1838. Møller was also well acquainted with Søren's brother Peter. Six years after Møller's death, Kierkegaard dedicated his work The Concept of Anxiety to him with remarks which were unusually personal for Kierkegaard. An unpublished draft of the dedication was even more emphatic, referring to Møller as the "inspiration of my youth" and "the mighty trumpet of my awakening".

To the late Professor Poul Martin Møller, The happy lover of Greek culture, the admirer of Homer, the confidant of Socrates, the interpreter of Aristotle, Denmark’s joy in "Joy over Denmark", though "widely traveled" always "remembered in the Danish summer", the object of my profound admiration, my profound loss, this work is dedicated. The Concept of Anxiety, dedication

Poul Moller has correctly pointed out that a court fool uses more wit in one year than many a witty author in his whole life, and why is that if it is not because the former is an existing person who every moment of the day must have witnesses at his disposal, whereas the other is witty only momentarily. Concluding Unscientific Postscript, Hong p. 351-352

In his journals, Kierkegaard notes that Møller provided him advice about the study of philosophy and communication. Part of Møller's influence came through his lectures on moral philosophy and the Greek and Roman classics that Kierkegaard attended while a student at the University of Copenhagen. In addition to classroom instructions, they also frequented Møller's favorite tea house. Kierkegaard adopted Møller's preferred method of writing, recording his thoughts in a short mixture of poetry and prose, into his own journals. Kierkegaard records that shortly before his death, Møller cautioned him regarding the polemical tone that he had adopted. Kierkegaard, however, viewed his tone as consistent with the New Testament writers.

=== Philosophy ===
There is also significant common ground between the philosophical views of Møller and Kierkegaard, in large part due to Møller's tutelage. After Møller's writings were published posthumously, Kierkegaard studied them in great detail. It is generally believed that Møller had a maieutic relationship with Kierkegaard, hence Kierkegaard's description of Møller as, "the confidant of Socrates”. They often debated the subjects of irony and humor, favorite topics of Kierkegaard's. Although Møller had studied the works of Hegel in great depth, he later became skeptical of Hegel's philosophy. He felt that Hegel's philosophy was limited because of its abstractness. In his attack on Hegelianism in Concluding Unscientific Postscript to Philosophical Fragments, Kierkegaard cites Møller as an opponent of Hegel. Another similarity is the dislike both men felt toward philosophical systems that emphasized thought without feeling. Møller highly valued personal authenticity in philosophy and preferred the use of aphorisms over discursive arguments. Kierkegaard greatly appreciated the lighthearted satirical tone of Møller's as a departure from the serious scholarly tone of many of their contemporary philosophers.

Møller's philosophy was also influenced by the theological work of the speculative theist philosopher Immanuel Hermann Fichte.
