= Daugård =

Town in Central Denmark

- Town
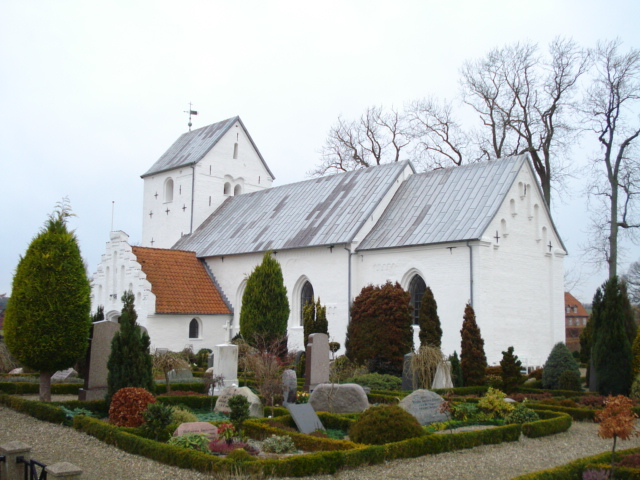
- Daugård Church

- Location in Denmark Daugård (Central Denmark Region)
- Coordinates: 55°44′11″N 9°42′34″E
- Country: Denmark
- Region: Central Denmark (Midtjylland)
- Municipality: Hedensted Municipality

Area
  - Urban: 0.7 km^{2} (0.27 sq mi)

Population (2026)
  - Urban: 1,098
  - Urban density: 1,600/km^{2} (4,100/sq mi)
- Time zone: UTC+1 (CET)
  - Summer (DST): UTC+2 (CEST)
- Postal code: DK-8721 Daugård

Daugård is a town, with a population of 1,098 (1 January 2026), in Hedensted Municipality, Central Denmark Region in Denmark. It is situated north of Vejle Fjord 4 km south of Hedensted and 11 km east of Vejle.

Daugård Church and the small manor of Williamsborg are located on the eastern outskirts of the town.
