= Øster Snede =

- Town
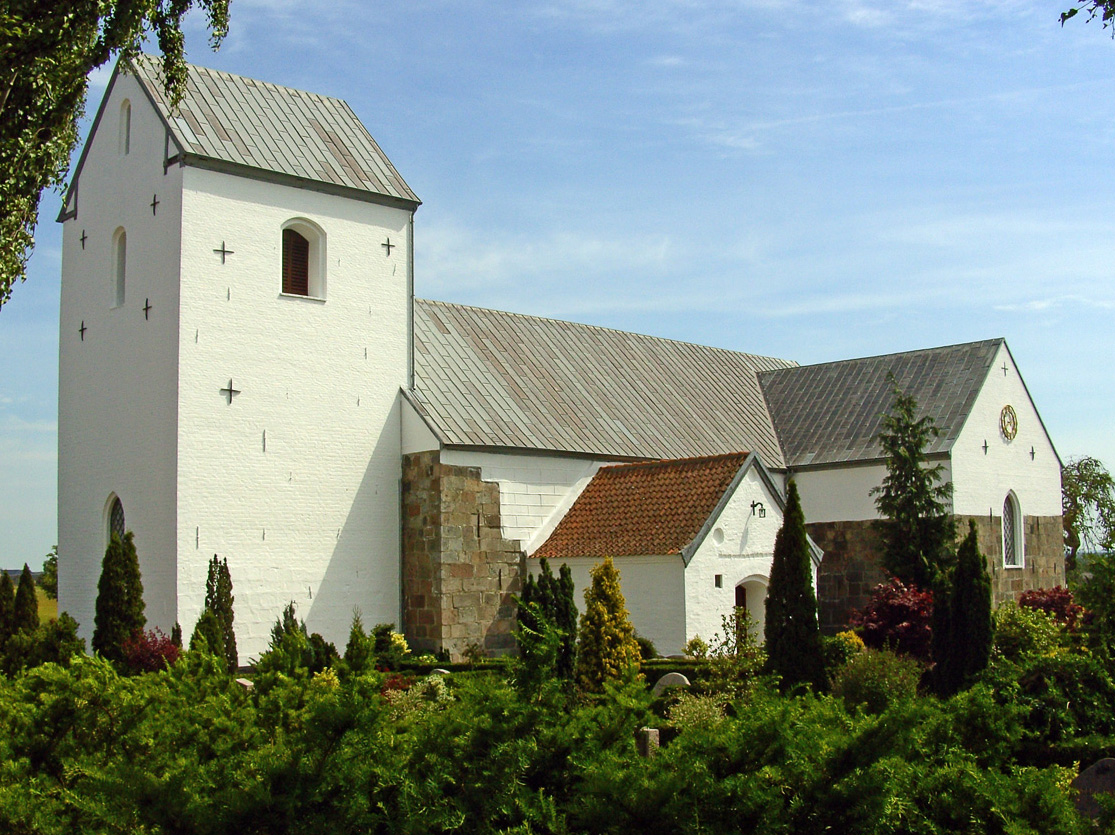
- Øster Snede Church

- Location in Denmark Øster Snede (Central Denmark Region)
- Coordinates: 55°47′54″N 9°38′53″E
- Country: Denmark
- Region: Central Denmark (Midtjylland)
- Municipality: Hedensted Municipality

Area
  - Urban: 1.0 km^{2} (0.39 sq mi)

Population (2026)
  - Urban: 1,214
  - Urban density: 1,200/km^{2} (3,100/sq mi)
- Time zone: UTC+1 (CET)
  - Summer (DST): UTC+2 (CEST)
- Postal Code: DK-8723 Løsning

Øster Snede is a town, with a population of 1,214 (1 January 2026), in Hedensted Municipality, Central Denmark Region in Denmark. It is located 5 km west of Hedensted, 14 km northeast of Vejle and 19 km southwest of Horsens.

Øster Snede Church is located on the western outskirts of the town.
