= Juelsminde Municipality =

Former municipality in Vejle, Jutland, Denmark

Coordinates: 55.7125°N 10.0106°E

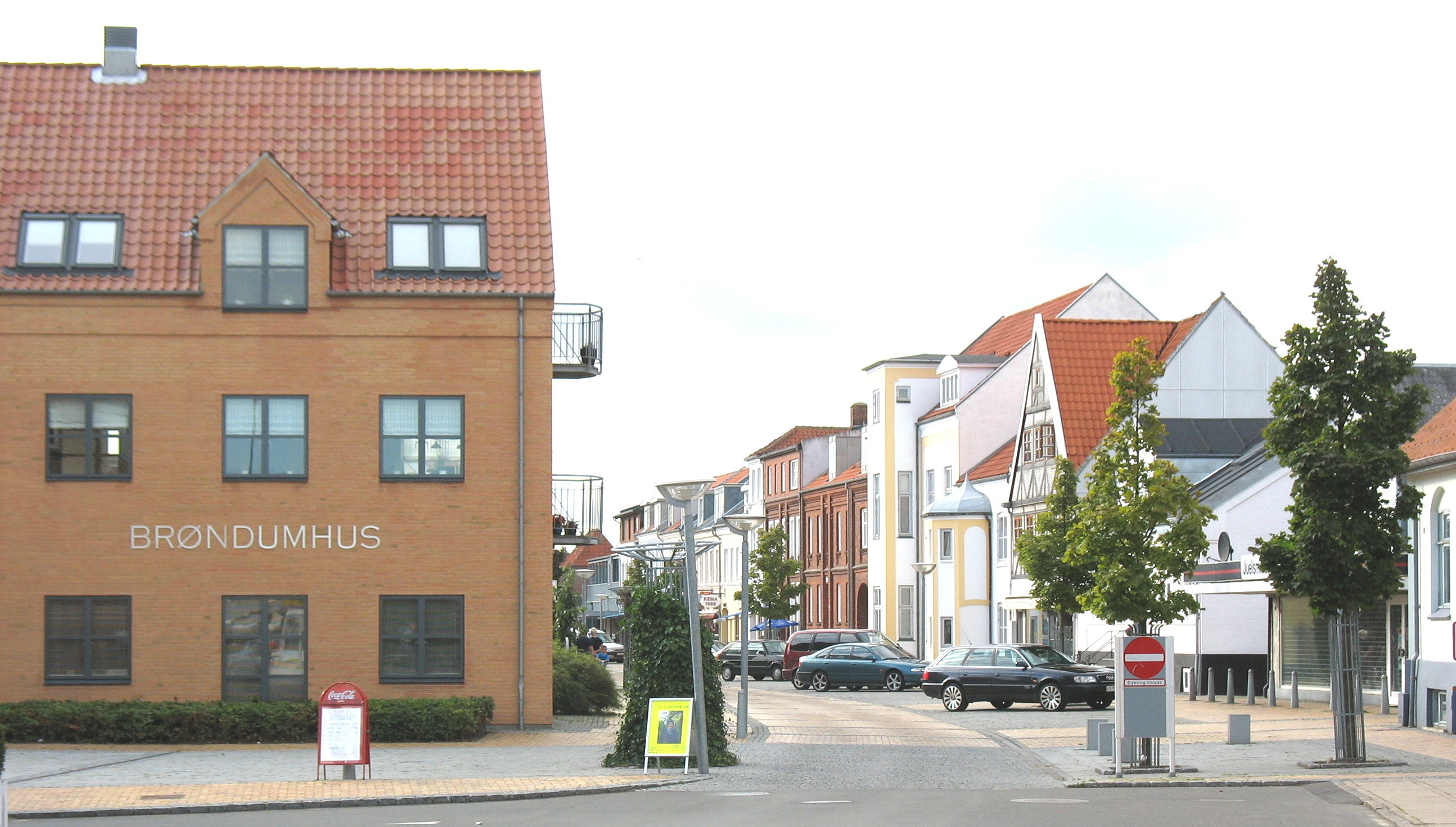

Until 1 January 2007 Juelsminde municipality was a municipality (Danish, kommune) in Vejle County on the east coast of the Jutland peninsula in central Denmark. The municipality included the island of Hjarnø, and covered an area of 240 km^{2}. It had a total population of 15,555 (2005). Its last mayor was Peter Schmidt Hansen, a member of the Venstre (Liberal Party) political party. The main town and the site of its municipal council was the town of Juelsminde.

The main part of the municipality was located on a headland.

Juelsminde municipality was, as the result of Kommunalreformen ("The Municipality Reform" of 2007), merged with Hedensted municipality and most of Tørring-Uldum municipality to form a new Hedensted municipality. This created a municipality with an area of 565 km^{2} and a total population of 56,508 (2005). The new municipality belongs to Region Midtjylland.
