= The Humane Nurse =

Statue in Copenhagen, Denmark

Coordinates: 55°42′42″N 12°32′33″E

- Den Humane Sygeplejerske (Danish)
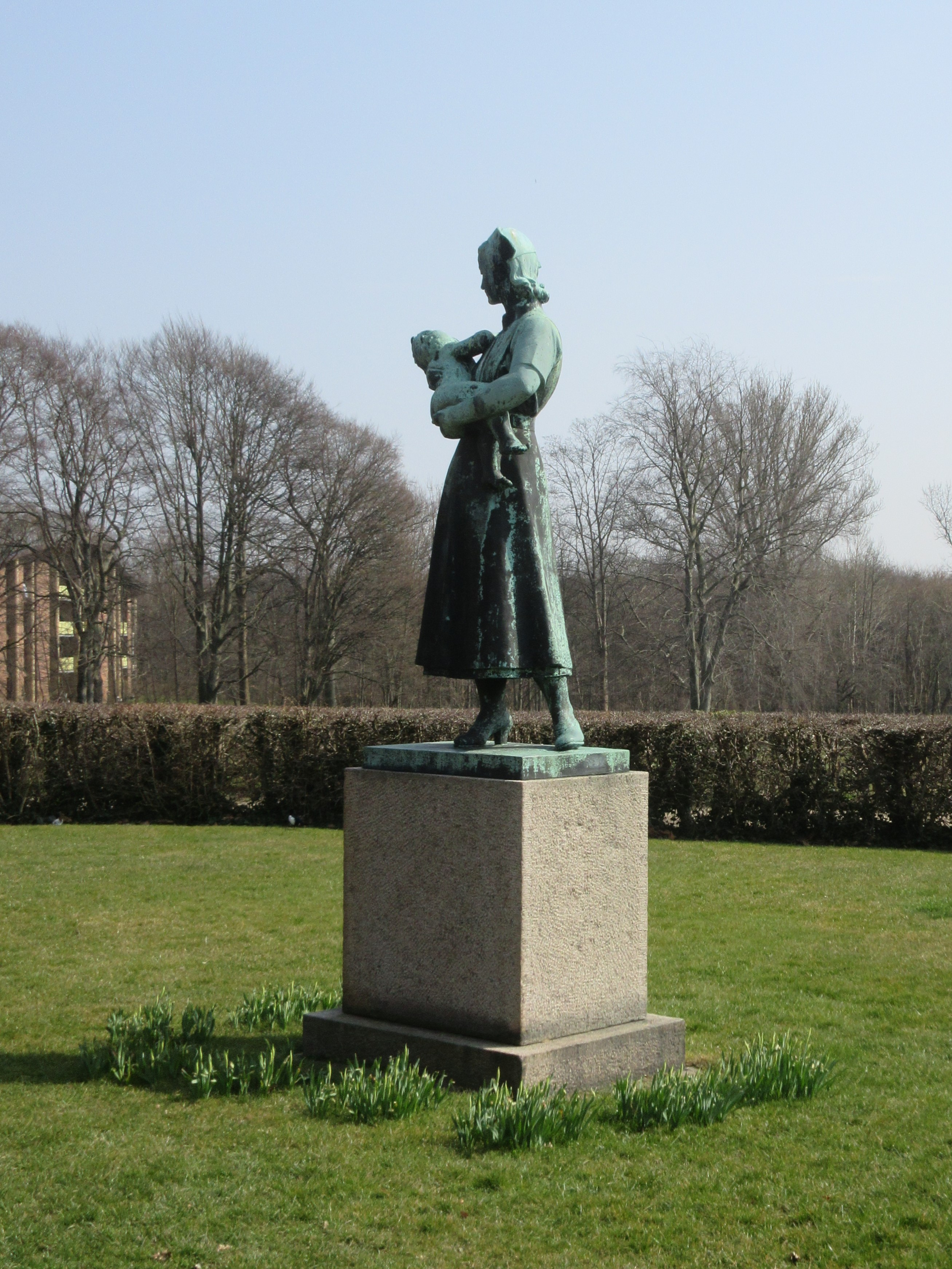
- Artist: Jens Jacob Bregnø
- Year: 1 September 1941
- Medium: Copper, Denmark
- Subject: A nurse holding an infant
- Location: Copenhagen

The Humane Nurse (Danish: Den Humane Sygeplejerske) is a monument to Danish nurses standing in front of Bispebjerg Hospital, facing its old main entrance and with Lersø Park as a backdrop, in the Bispebjerg district of Copenhagen, Denmark. It was unveiled in 1941 and depicts a uniformed nurse holding a somewhat obstinate infant in her arms.

== Description ==
The monument is located on the south side of the street Bispebjerg Bakke with the Lersø Park as a backdrop and facing the old main entrance of Bispebjerg Hospital on the other side of the street. It consists of a bronze statue of a nurse placed on a Bornholmian granite pedestal. The monument measures approximately 331 by 125 by 95 centimetres (130 in × 49 in × 37 in). The statue is 220 centimetres (87 in) tall.

The statue depicts a young nurse holding an infant in her arms. She wears a nurses' uniform consisting of a short-sleeved dress, apron, cap and closed, long-necked shoes. Nurses' caps were first worn by Danish nurses at the Garrison Hospital in the beginning of the nineteenth century and were introduced at Bispebjerg Hospital in 1913.

== History ==
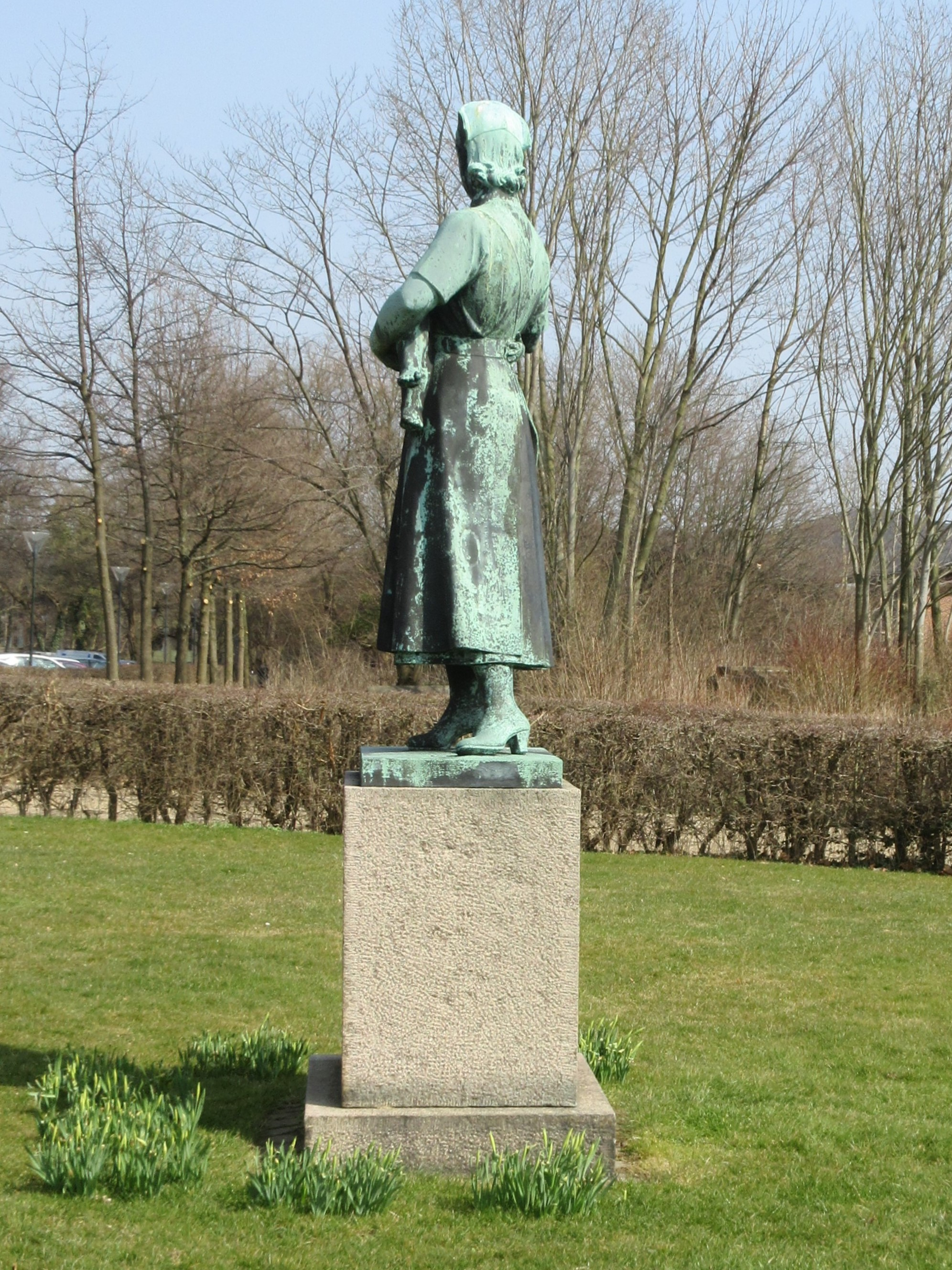
The statue seen from the west

Bispebjerg Hospital opened in 1913. The monument was a donation from the Foundation for the Advancement of Artistic Purposes (Fonden til kunstneriske Formaals Fremme) with funding from the Goldschmidt Grant for the Embellishment of Copenhagen (Fhv. Grosserer og Farver B. Goldschmidts Legat til Københavns Forskønnelse). It was designed by Jens Jacob Bregnø. He found the model for the statue by studying the group photographs of graduating nurses from Copenhagen Municipal Hospital in 1938 and selected Pia Kappel, née Togeby (1910–2004) for her "sculptural appearance".

The statue was unveiled on 1 September 1941, the 65th anniversary of the introduction of the first professional training programme for nurses in Denmark. The way the nurse holds the infant was met with criticism for her failure to provide head support. Bregnø explained that he had intentionally chosen the design with an obstinate child to avoid an overly twee expression.
