= Patrick Nordström =

Scandinavian artist (1870–1929)

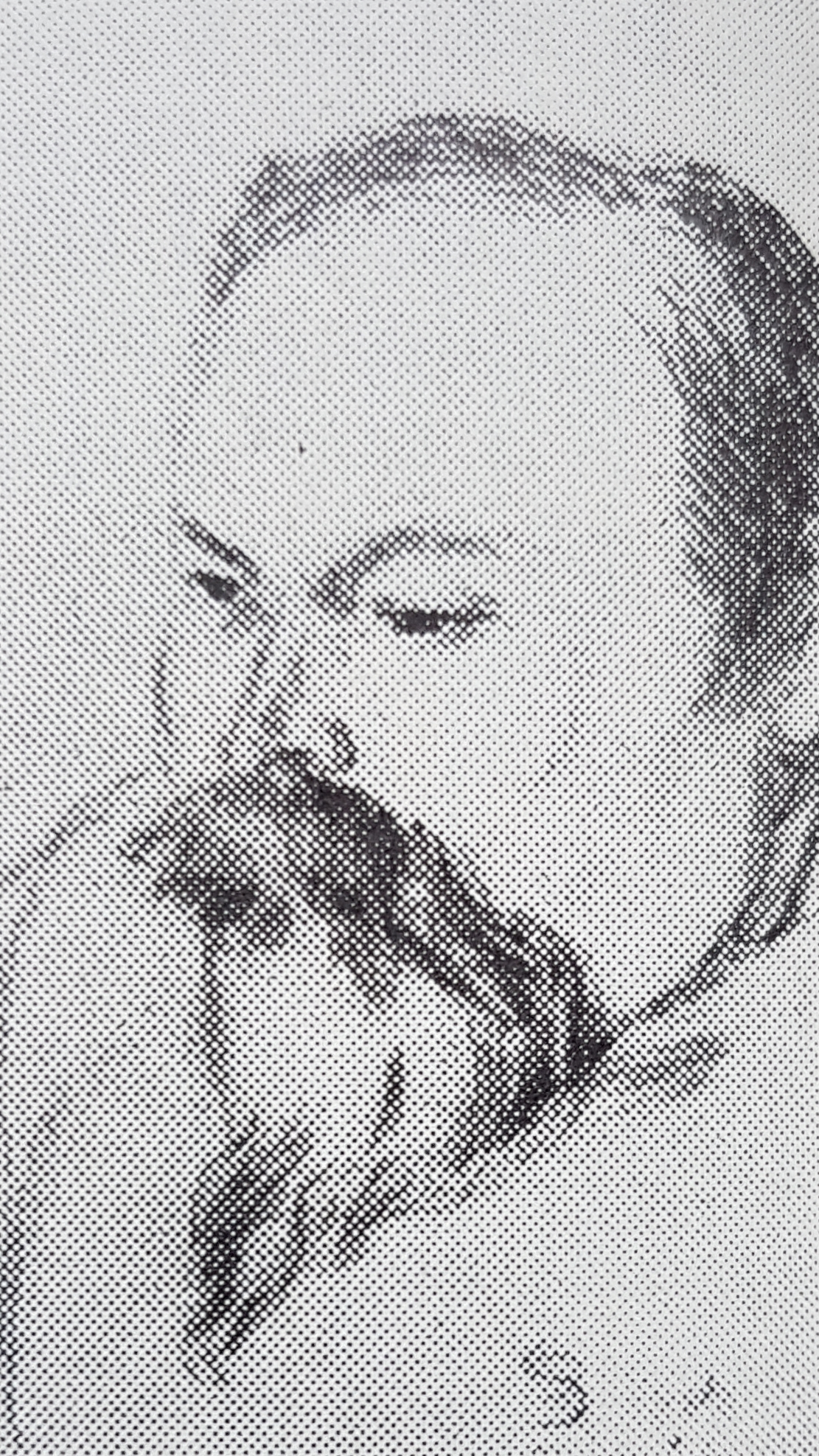

Patrick Nordström (1870–1929) was a Swedish-Danish ceramist. He worked for the Royal Copenhagen Porcelain Manufactury from 1912 to 1922.

== Biography ==
Patrick Nordstrom was born in Sweden in 1870. He came to Denmark in 1900 after a successful career in France, and where he had his own display at the 1900 Paris Exposition. He established a workshop in Islev outside Copenhagen. He worked for the Royal Porcelain Manufactury from 1912 to 1922 where he established its production of stoneware. He began what become the Danish style of ceramics. At Royal Copenhagen, and at his own studio on Islev, he invented the Danish style which organically emerged from Chinese, Japanese, and French models via Nordstrom’s masterful work. In time, this shift to the invention of a new ceramics became clear. Later, after his untimely death from having opened his kiln too early, it followed naturally that B&G took over his studio, and continued and focused his work so that it further offered a modern Danish pottery.

== Style ==
Nordstrom exhibited at the 1900 Paris Exposition. Between the late 19th century and his death in 1929, he developed a number of new Ceramic glazes, including Gundestrup, Sung, and Ox Blood. Before 1900, he was the first Paris ceramic artist to reinvent the legendary Chinese Ox Blood. He was inspired by other great pottery making cultures, and also developed distinctly modern forms, and richly varied glazes of high artistic quality.

== Exhibitions ==
After his death, as he began to receive credit for the emergence of Danish pottery; his work was featured in an exhibition at the National Museum in Stockholm from 16 March - 8 April 1956 and at the Danish Design Museum in Copenhagen from 12 April -27 May 1956. Correctly, he is still considered a relative unknown, and underrated potter in Denmark, and in much of the world.
