= Hornsyld =

- Town
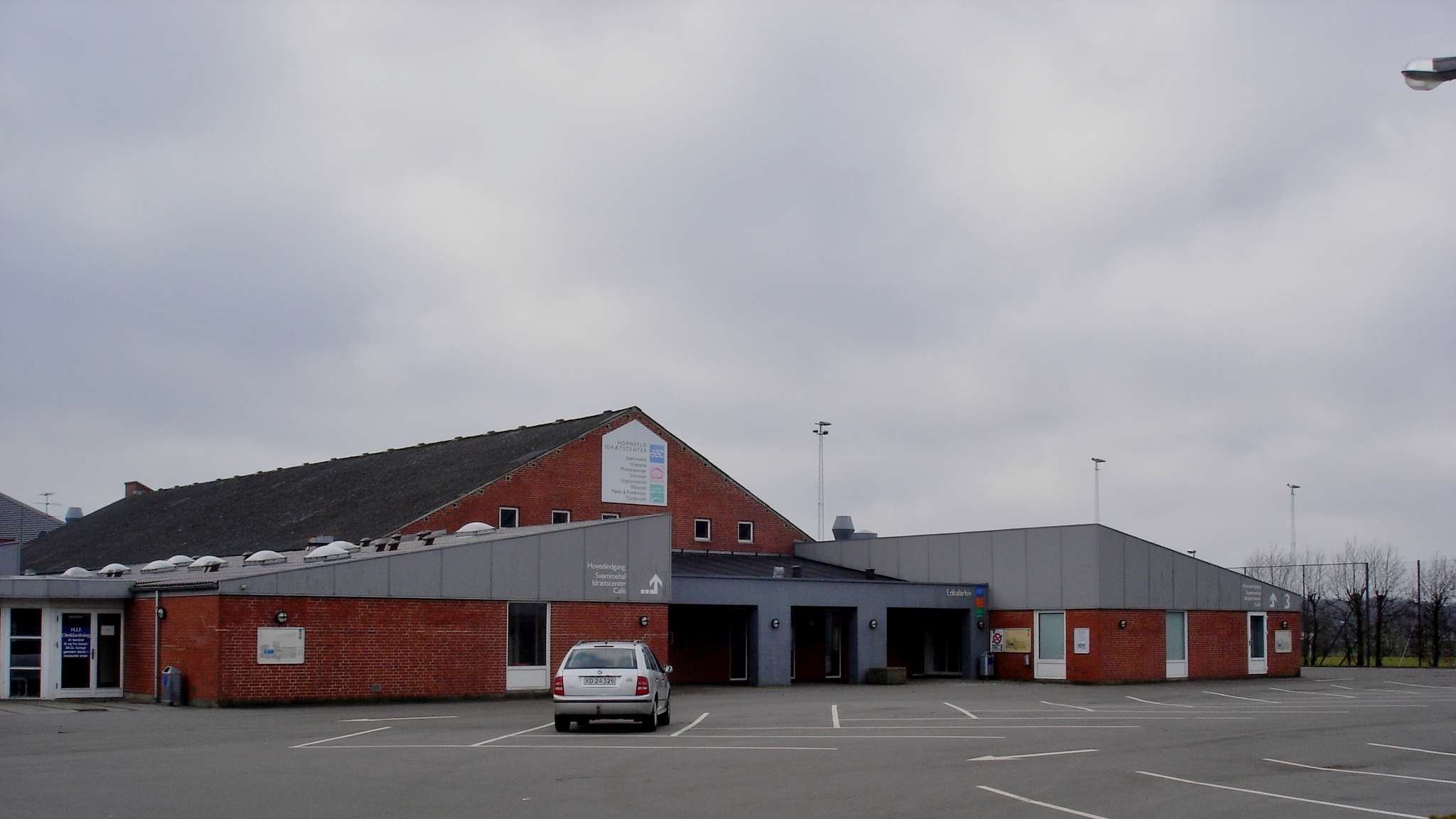

- Location in Denmark Hornsyld (Central Denmark Region)
- Coordinates: 55°45′22″N 9°51′23″E
- Country: Denmark
- Region: Region Midtjylland
- Municipality: Hedensted

Area
  - Urban: 1.7 km^{2} (0.66 sq mi)

Population (2026)
  - Urban: 1,649
  - Urban density: 970/km^{2} (2,500/sq mi)
- Time zone: UTC+1 (CET)
  - Summer (DST): UTC+2 (CEST)
- Postal code: DK-8783 Hornsyld

Hornsyld is a minor Danish town located between Hedensted and Juelsminde. It has a population of 1,649 (1 January 2026). Due to the amalgamation of municipalities in 2007 Hornsyld became a part of Hedensted Municipality.

Hornsyld has a lot of industry in proportion to its size. Companies as Triax, Hornsyld Købmandsgaard, EM Fiberglas and Dan-Hill-Plast are deep-rooted in the town.
