= Uldum =

- Town
- Location within Denmark Location within Central Denmark Region
- Coordinates: 55°50′52″N 9°35′36″E
- Country: Denmark
- Region: Central Denmark (Midtjylland)
- Municipality: Hedensted Municipality

Area
  - Urban: 1.6 km^{2} (0.62 sq mi)

Population (2026)
  - Urban: 1,414
  - Urban density: 880/km^{2} (2,300/sq mi)
- Time zone: UTC+1 (CET)
  - Summer (DST): UTC+2 (CEST)
- Postal code: DK-7171 Uldum

Uldum is a small town, with a population of 1,414 (1 January 2026), in Hedensted Municipality, Central Denmark Region in Denmark.

Uldum was the municipal seat of the former Tørring-Uldum Municipality until 1 January 2007.

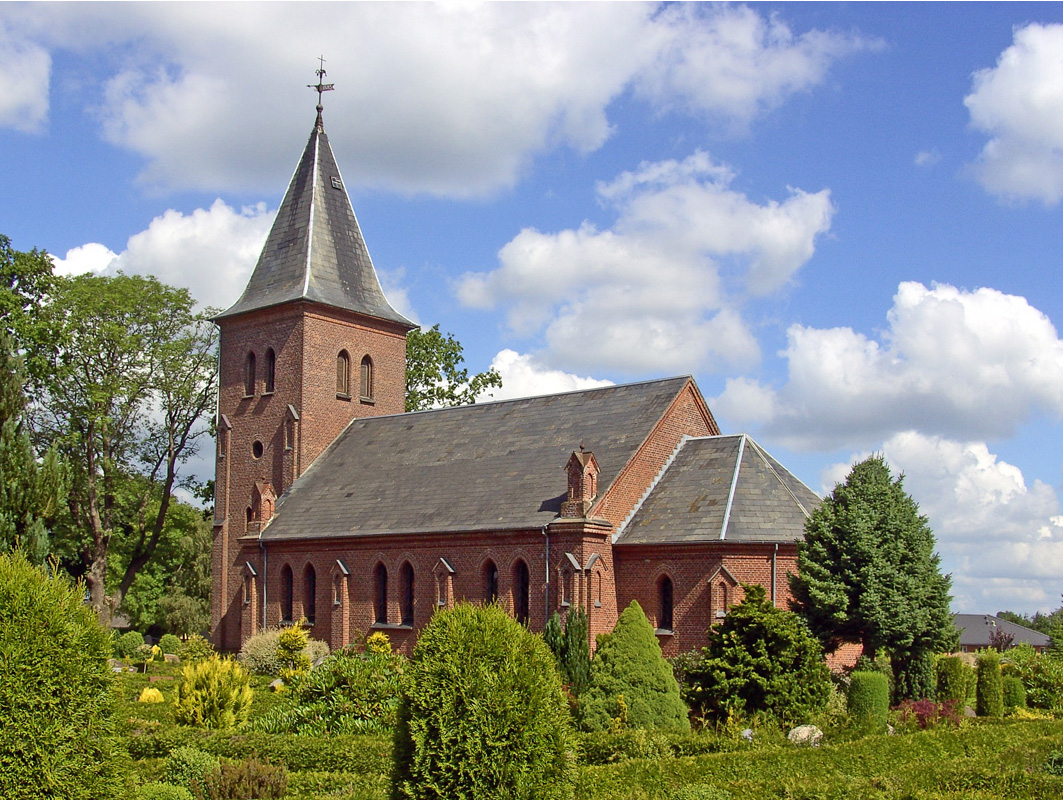
Uldum Church

Uldum Church was built in 1883. A granite stone in the churchyard features hollows from the Bronze Age.

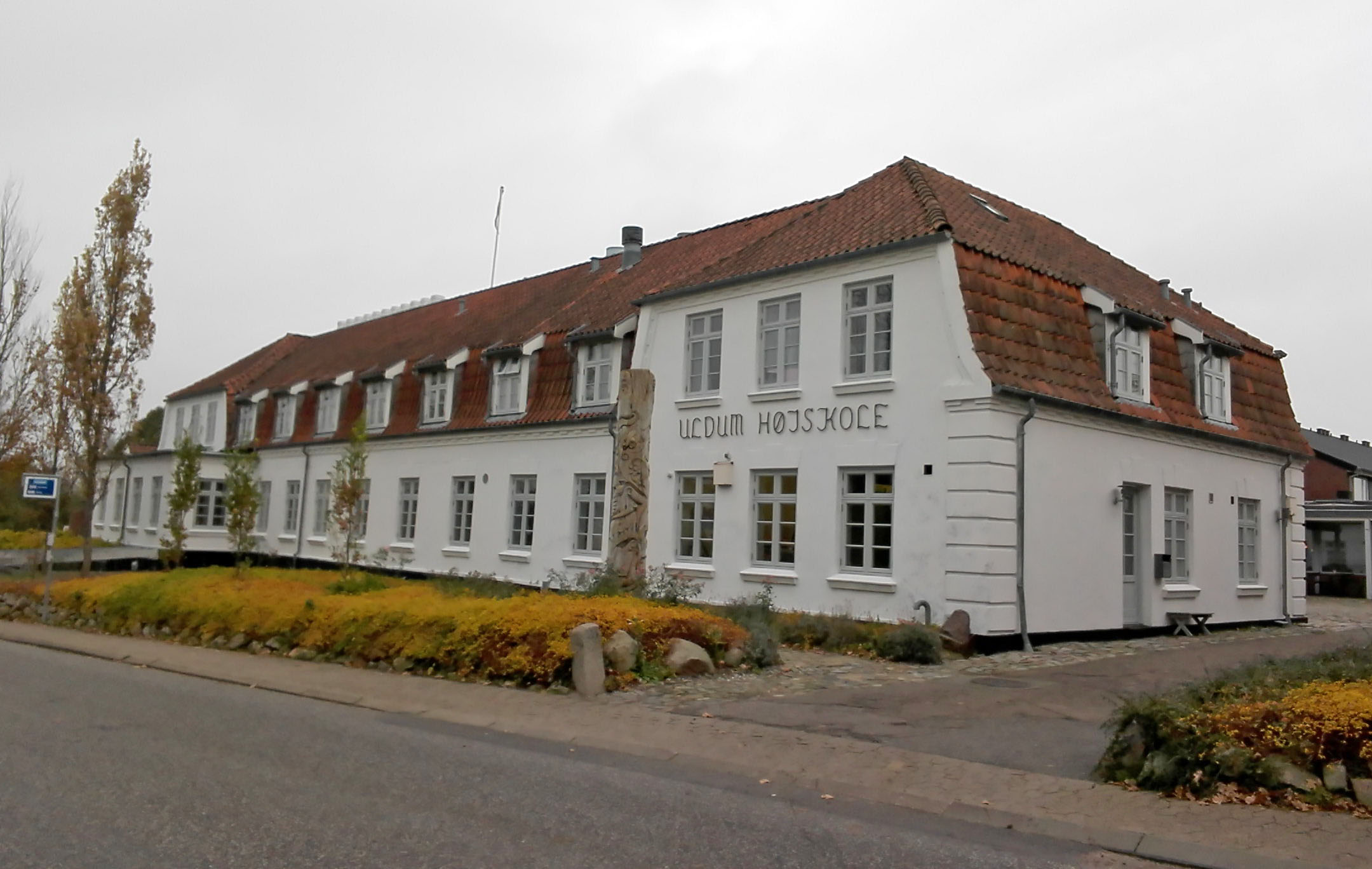
Uldum Højskole

Uldum Højskole, a Danish folk high school and one of Denmark's oldest high schools, founded in 1849, is located in the town.

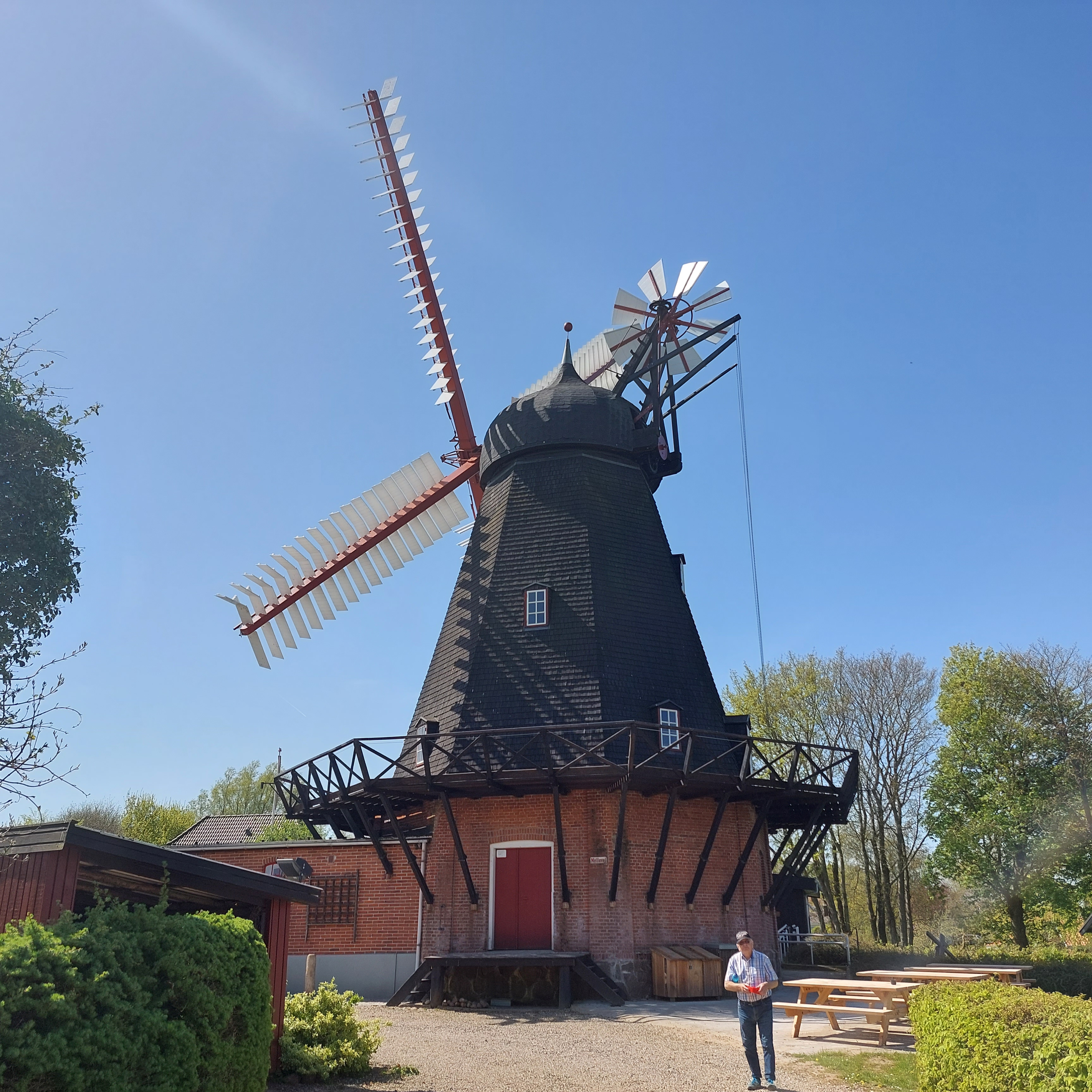
Uldum Mill

Uldum Mill from 1895 is located in the western part of the town. It is a so-called Dutch mill and the largest of its kind in Denmark. Today its a working mill museum.

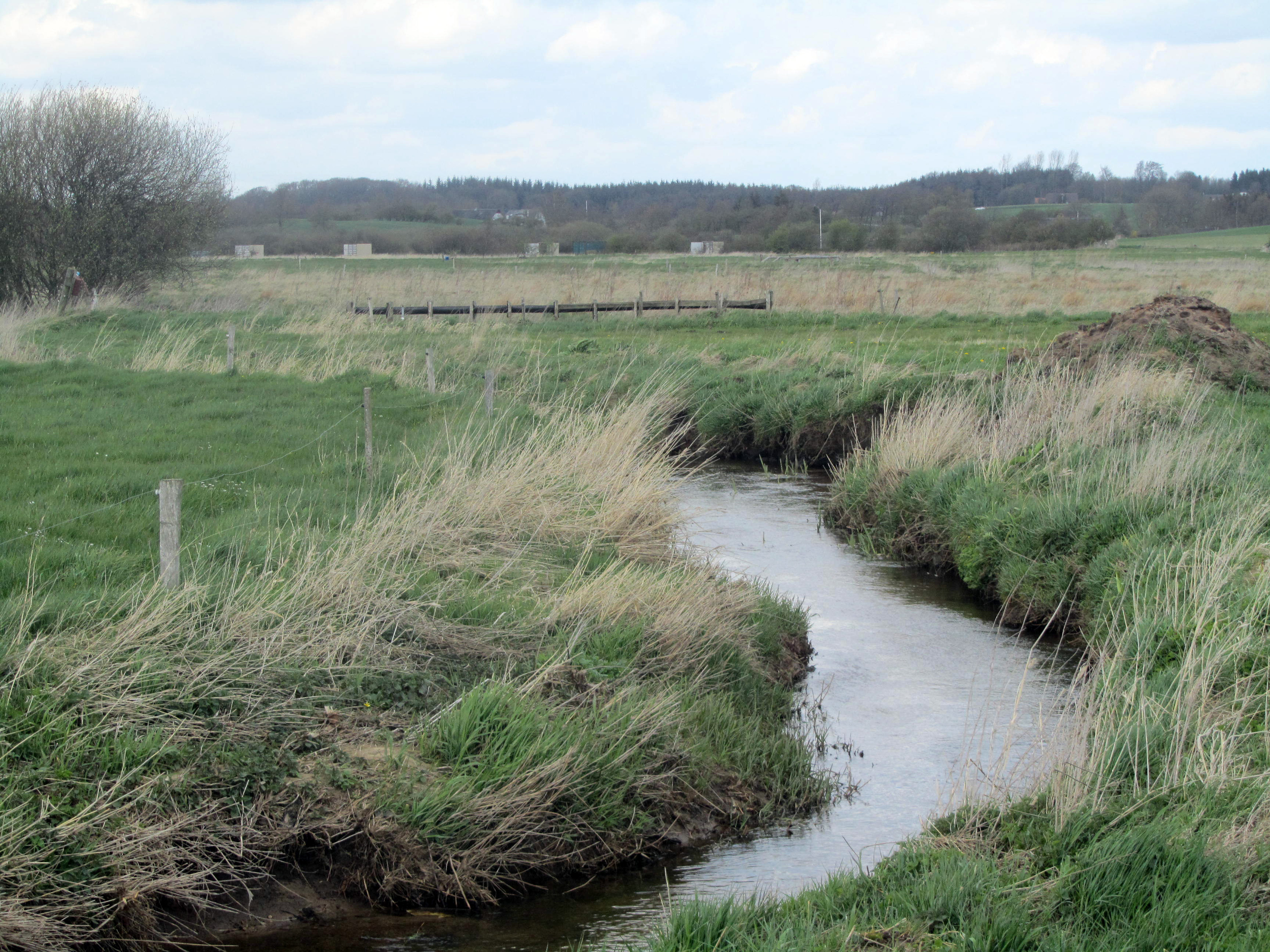
Uldum Marsh (Uldum Kær)

Uldum Marsh (Uldum Kær) is located between Uldum and Tørring west of Uldum. It is Denmark's largest non-tidal marsh with an area of 1200 hectares, through which the stream Gudenåen flows.

== Notable people ==
- Poul Martin Møller (1794–1838) a Danish academic, writer, and poet
