= Lindved =

- Town
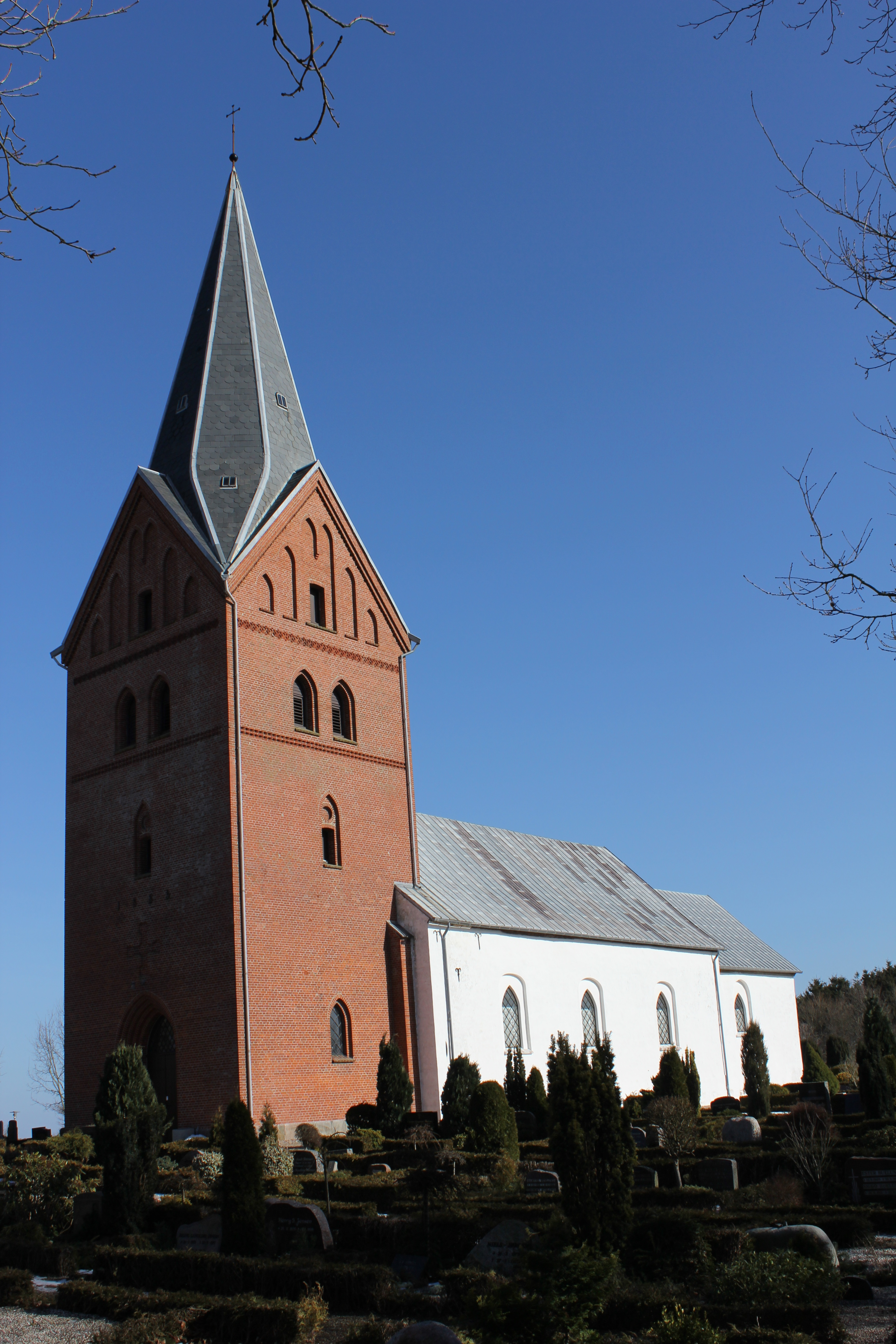
- Sindbjerg Church northwest of Lindved

- Location in Denmark Lindved (Central Denmark Region)
- Coordinates: 55°47′39″N 9°34′41″E
- Country: Denmark
- Region: Central Denmark (Midtjylland)
- Municipality: Hedensted Municipality
- Parish: Sindbjerg Parish

Area
  - Urban: 1.1 km^{2} (0.42 sq mi)

Population (2026)
  - Urban: 1,466
  - Urban density: 1,300/km^{2} (3,500/sq mi)
- Time zone: UTC+1 (CET)
  - Summer (DST): UTC+2 (CEST)
- Postal code: DK-7100 Vejle

Lindved is a town, with a population of 1,466 (1 January 2026). It is located about 10 km north of Vejle in Hedensted Municipality, Central Denmark Region in Denmark.

The parish church Sindbjerg Church, dating back to the 12th century, is located 2 km northwest of Lindved and 300 metres west of exit 3 Lindved at the Danish national road 18 motorway between Vejle and Holstebro.
