= Juelsminde =

- Town
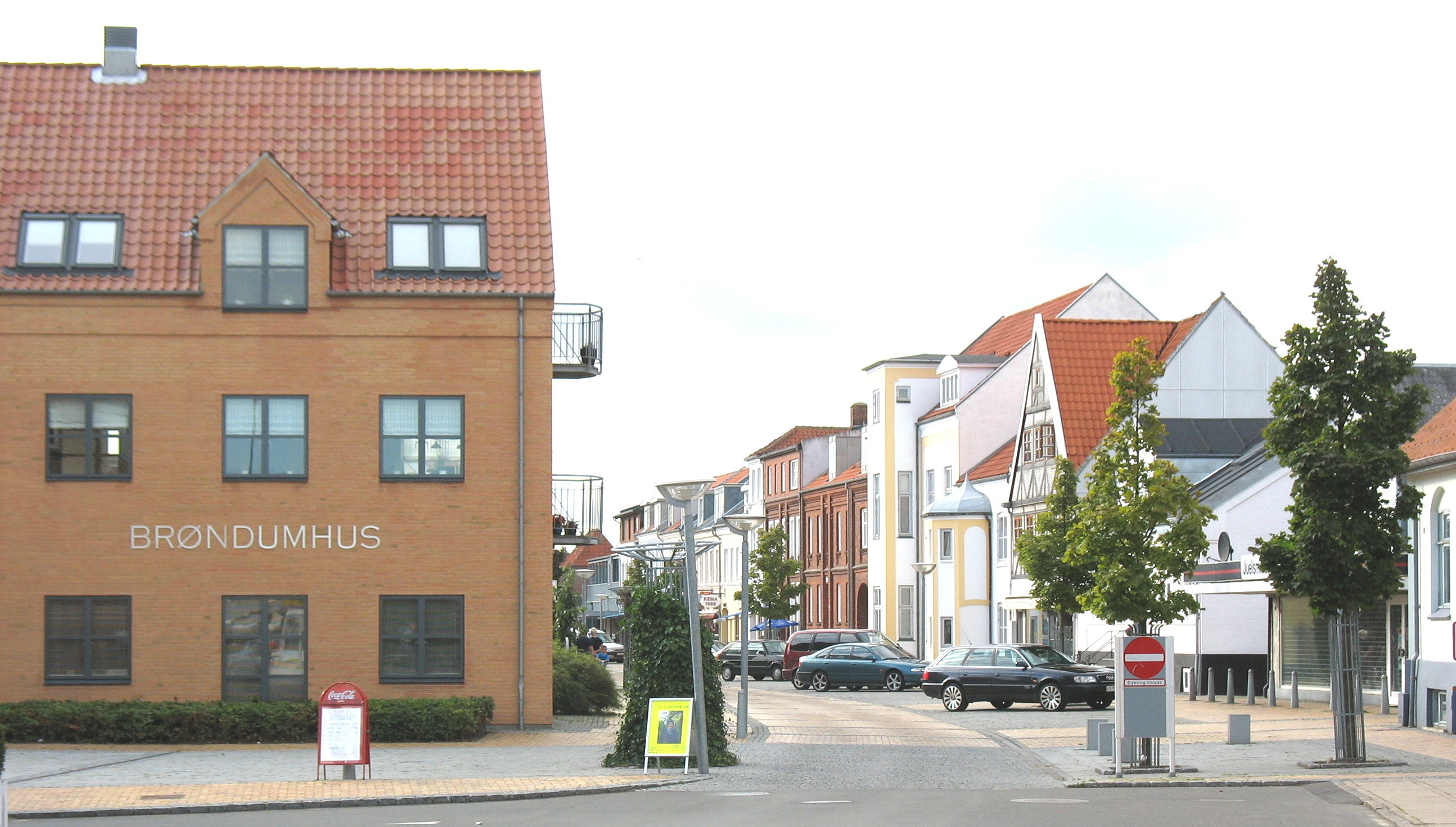
- The main street in Juelsminde

- Location in Denmark Juelsminde (Central Denmark Region)
- Coordinates: 55°42′29″N 10°0′3″E
- Country: Denmark
- Region: Central Denmark (Midtjylland)
- Municipality: Hedensted

Area
  - Urban: 4 km^{2} (1.5 sq mi)

Population (2026)
  - Urban: 3,998
  - Urban density: 1,000/km^{2} (2,600/sq mi)
  - Gender: 1,907 males and 2,091 females
- Time zone: UTC+1 (Central European Time)
  - Summer (DST): UTC+2 (Central European Summer Time)
- Postal code: DK-7130 Juelsminde

Juelsminde is a coastal town in Hedensted Municipality, Central Denmark Region in Denmark. It is located 23 km southeast of Horsens, 32 km east of Vejle and 26 km eastsoutheast of Hedensted.

Juelsminde was the municipal seat of the former Juelsminde Municipality until 1. January 2007.

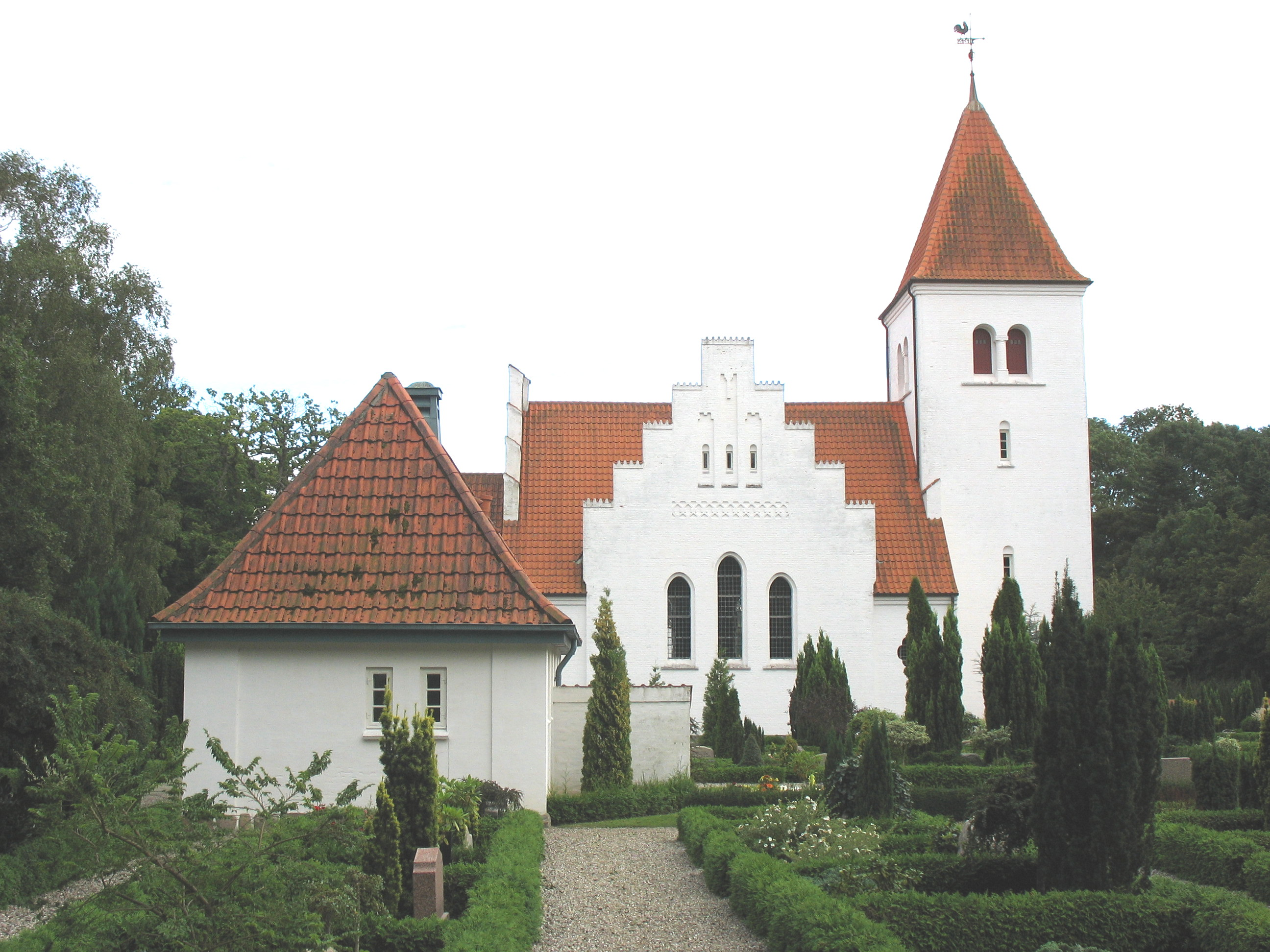
Juelsminde Church

Juelsminde Church built in 1911–12 is the youngest church in Hedensted Municipality.

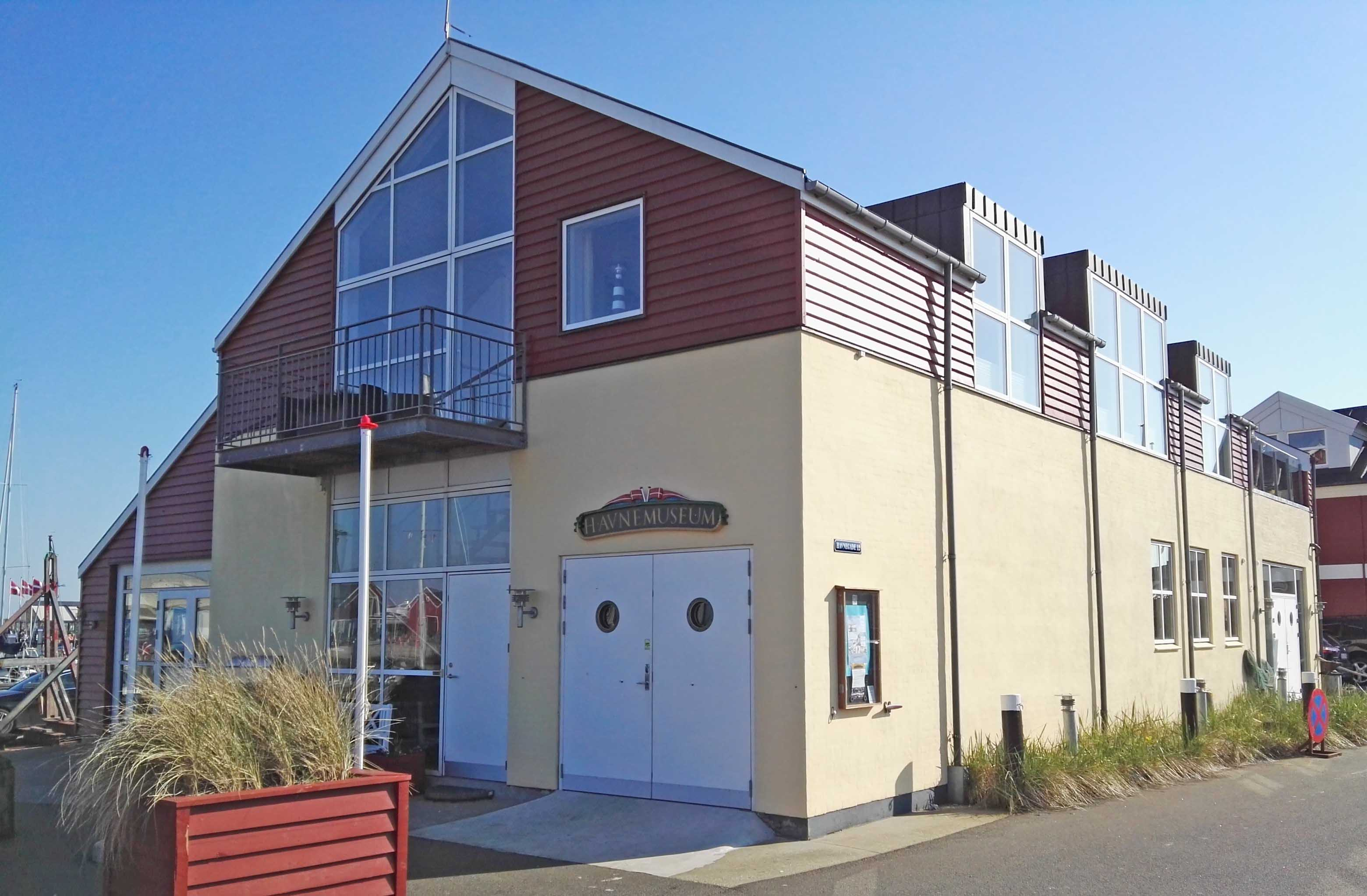
Juelsminde Harbour Museum

Juelsminde Harbour Museum is located in the old harbour smithy on Juelsminde Marina. The Museum's exhibition tells the history of the harbour and its various professions and activities throughout the times.

== Notable people ==
- Gunnar Berg (1909–1989) a Swiss-born Danish composer and leading exponent of serialism. Between 1965 and 1976 he lived at the old school at Lindved between Horsens and Juelsminde
- Anders Schmidt Hansen (born 1978 in Juelsminde) a Danish professional golfer.
