= Tørring =

- Town
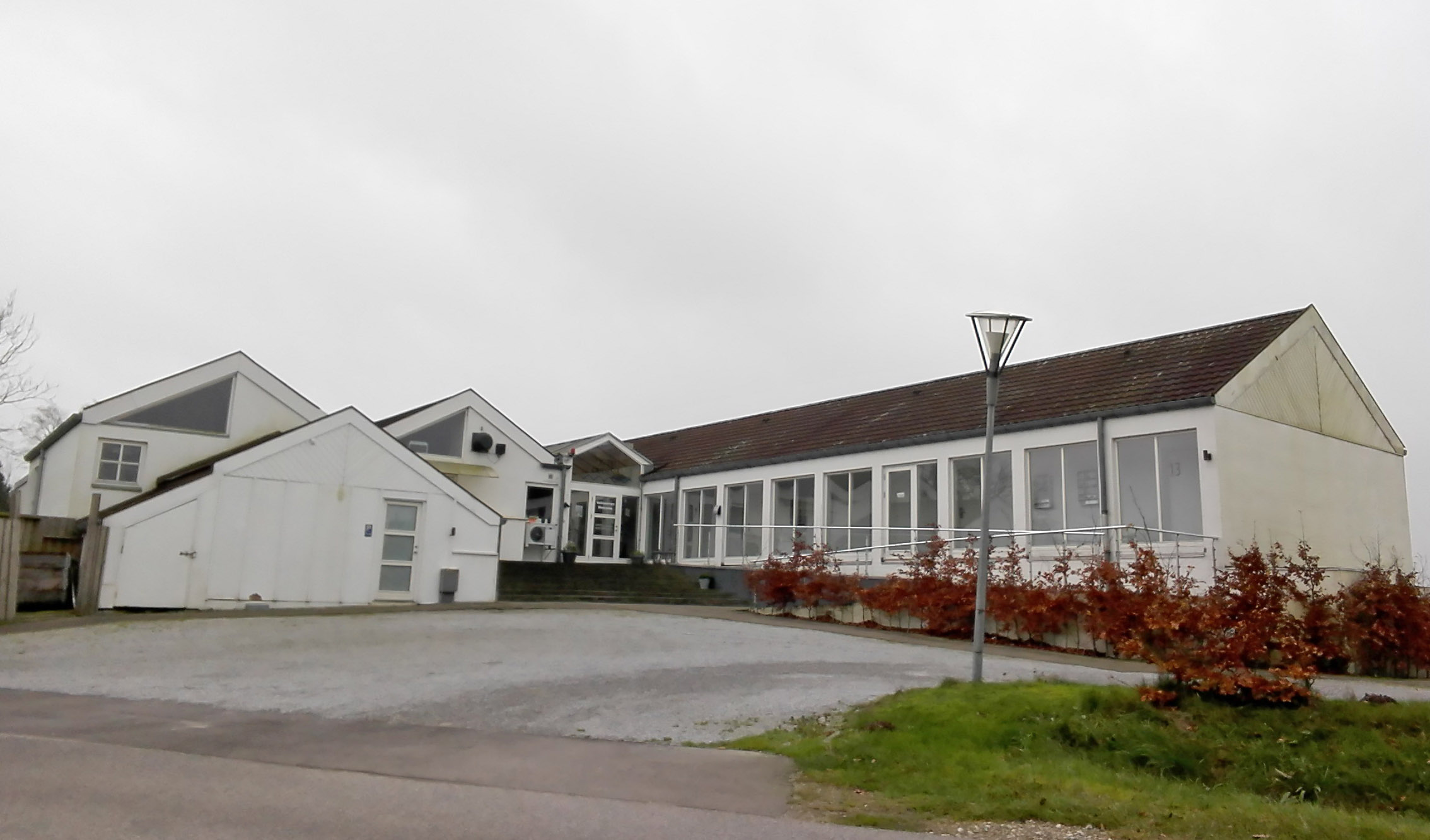
- Hotel Gudenå in Tørring

- Location in Denmark Tørring (Central Denmark Region)
- Coordinates: 55°51′15″N 9°29′6″E
- Country: Denmark
- Region: Central Denmark (Midtjylland)
- Municipality: Hedensted Municipality

Area
  - Urban: 2.2 km^{2} (0.85 sq mi)

Population (2026)
  - Urban: 2,917
  - Urban density: 1,300/km^{2} (3,400/sq mi)
- Time zone: UTC+1 (CET)
  - Summer (DST): UTC+2 (CEST)
- Postal code: DK-7160 Tørring

Tørring is a town, with a population of 2,917 (1 January 2026), in Hedensted Municipality, Central Denmark Region in Denmark. It is located 27 km west of Horsens, 20 km north of Vejle, 24 km east of Give and 20 km northwest of Hedensted.

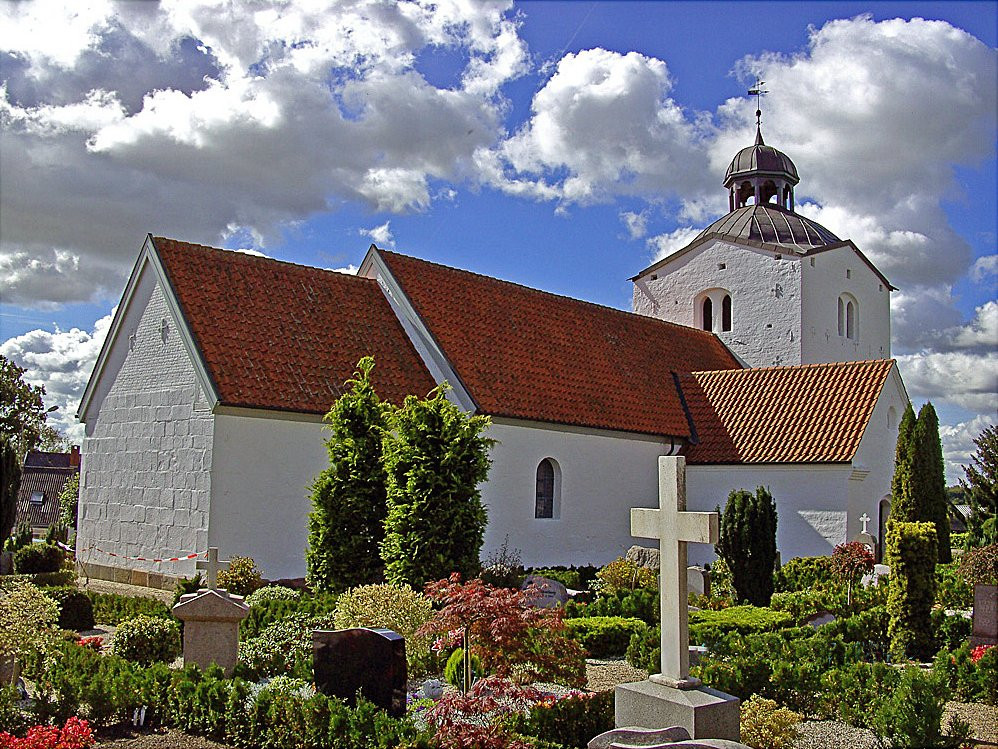
Tørring Church

Tørring Church was built in 1200. The characteristic octagonal dome of the church tower is from the beginning of the 17th century.

Tørring is located at the Gudenå, about 10 km southeast of its spring, from where canoeing on the river is possible.

The closest airport is Billund Airport.
