= Hedensted =

- Town and urban area
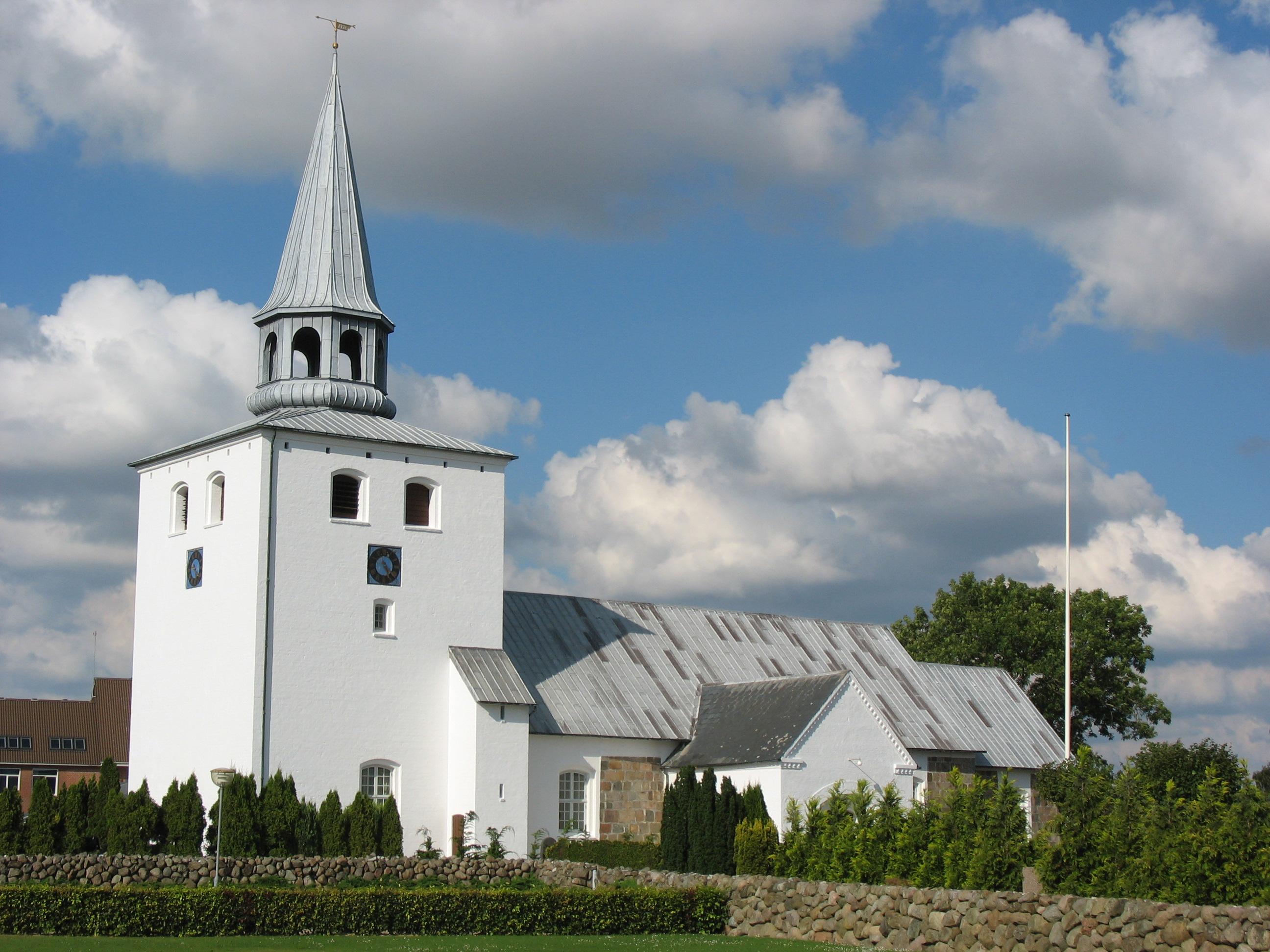
- Hedensted Church

- Location in Denmark Hedensted (Central Denmark Region)
- Coordinates: 55°46′21″N 09°42′06″E
- Country: Denmark
- Region: Mid Jutland (Midtjylland)
- Municipality: Hedensted

Government
  - Mayor: Kasper Glyngø

Area
  - Urban: 11.2 km^{2} (4.3 sq mi)

Population (2026)
  - Urban: 13,562
  - Urban density: 1,210/km^{2} (3,140/sq mi)
  - Gender: 6,836 males and 6,726 females
- Time zone: UTC+1 (CET)
  - Summer (DST): UTC+2 (CEST)
- Postal code: DK-8722 Hedensted

Hedensted is a Danish town in Region Midtjylland and the seat of Hedensted Municipality. Its population, including its northern neighbouring town Løsning, is 13,562. The municipality as a whole has a population of 48,578 (1 January 2026).

== History ==
The oldest and one of the most important buildings in the town is the local church (Hedensted Kirke), built around 1175. It is especially noted for its early murals showing Christ, St. Peter, and St. Paul.

Hedensted had the benefits of a railway station from 1868 until it was closed down in 1974. However, in 2006 the station was reopened on roughly the same spot.

Like many other Danish towns, Hedensted was expanded with large residential areas around the original town centre. Later, industrial parks followed south and west of the town.

== Geography ==
Hedensted is located midway between the larger towns of Horsens and Vejle. East of Hedensted, by the coast, lies the town of Juelsminde which in 2007 became a part of the municipality of Hedensted.

== Notable people ==
- Jens Jensen-Egeberg (1848 in Hedensted – 1922) a Danish painter of portraits, landscapes and genre scenes. He also worked in pastels.
- Johannes Carl Andersen (1873 in Klakring – 1962) a New Zealand clerk, poet, ethnologist, librarian, editor and historian
- Jens Jacob Bregnø (1877 in Hedensted – 1946) a Danish sculptor and ceramics designer
- Margrethe Hald (1897 in Neder Vrigsted – 1982) a Danish textile historian and a curator at the National Museum of Denmark
- Paul Hüttel (born 1935 in Hedensted) a Danish actor, appearing in over 50 films and TV shows since 1960

=== Sport ===
- Henrik Lundgaard (born 1969 in Hedensted) a Danish rally driver
- Sarah Paulsen (born 1997 in Hedensted) a Danish handball player who plays for Viborg HK
- Christian Lundgaard (born 2001 in Hedensted) a Danish racing driver
