= Hedensted Municipality =

Hedensted Municipality Hedensted Kommune (Danish)
- Municipality
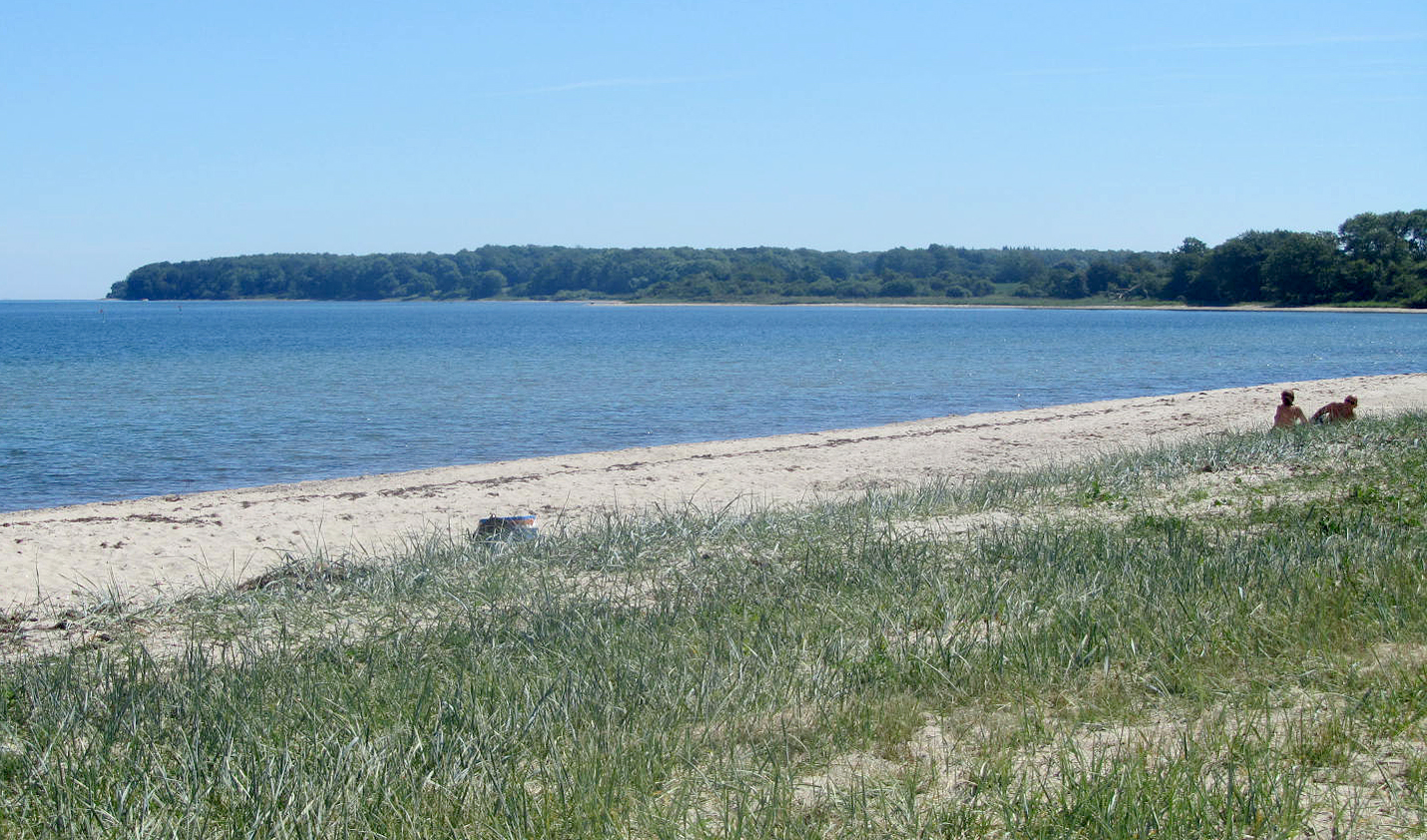
- As Hoved as seen from As Vig

- Coat of arms

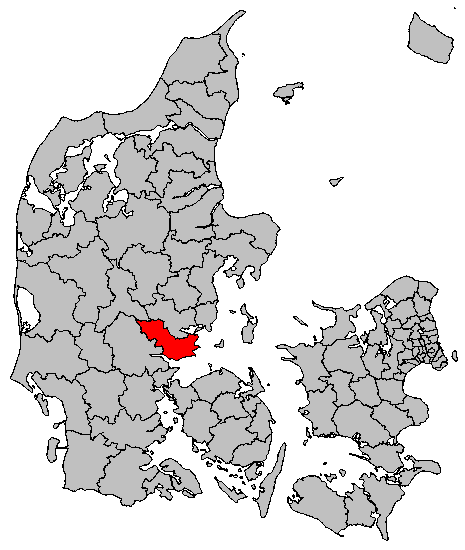
- Location in Denmark
- Coordinates: 55°46′14″N 9°41′58″E
- Country: Denmark
- Region: Central Denmark
- Established: 1 January 2007

Government
  - Mayor: Ole Vind

Area
  - Total: 551.36 km^{2} (212.88 sq mi)

Population (1 January 2026)
  - Total: 48,578
  - Density: 88.106/km^{2} (228.19/sq mi)
- Time zone: UTC+1 (CET)
  - Summer (DST): UTC+2 (CEST)
- Postal code: 8722
- Website: www.hedensted.dk

Hedensted Municipality (Danish: Hedensted Kommnue) is a municipality (Danish, kommune) in Region Midtjylland formed out of three former municipalities, one of which with the same name, 1 January 2007 on the Jutland peninsula in central Denmark. Its seat and main town is Hedensted.

== Overview ==
The coastal town municipality south of Aarhus, and sandwiched in between Horsens and Vejle, and bordering Ikast-Brande Municipality to the northwest, covers an area of 551.36 km^{2} and has a total population of 48,578 (1 January 2026). The main town and the site of its municipal council is the inland town of Hedensted. Its mayor from 1 January 2022 is Ole Vind, a member of the centre-right Venstre party.

On 1 January 2007, as a result of Kommunalreformen ("The Municipal Reform" of 2007), the former Juelsminde municipality and most of Tørring-Uldum municipality, where one parish, Grejs, in a local referendum 19 April 2005 chose to become a part of Vejle Municipality, was merged with the former Hedensted municipality that existed from 1970 until 2006.

The municipality is part of Business Region Aarhus and of the East Jutland metropolitan area, which had a total population of 1.378 million in 2016.

== Locations ==
Hedensted	13,000
Juelsminde	4,000
Tørring	3,000
Hornsyld	1,600
Lindved	1,400
Uldum	1,400
Øster Snede	1,200
Rask Mølle	1,100
Daugård	1,100

== Politics ==
=== Municipal council ===
Hedensted's municipal council consists of 27 members, elected every four years.

Below are the municipal councils elected since the Municipal Reform of 2007.

Election	Party									Total seats	Turnout	Elected mayor
Election	A	C	D	F	I	K	L	O	V	Total seats	Turnout	Elected mayor
2005	11	1				1	1	2	11	27	75.1%	Jørn Juel Nielsen (A)
2009	8	1		2		1		3	12	27	71.1%	Kirsten Terkilsen (V)
2013	8			1		1		4	13	27	76.1%	Kirsten Terkilsen (V)
2017	8			1	1	1		4	12	27	75.1%	Kasper Glyngø (A)
2021	9	2	1	1		2		2	10	27	70.0%	Ole Vind (V)
Data from Kmdvalg.dk 2005, 2009, 2013, 2017 and 2021

== Sources ==
- Municipal statistics: NetBorger Kommunefakta, delivered from KMD aka Kommunedata (Municipal Data)
- Municipal mergers and neighbors: Eniro new municipalities map
