= 2025 Favrskov municipal election =

- 18 November 2025

All 25 seats to the Favrskov municipal council 13 seats needed for a majority
- Turnout: 28,555 (75.7%) ▲2.6%
	First party	Second party	Third party
	C	A	V
Party	Conservatives	Social Democrats	Venstre
Last election	6 seats, 21.2%	9 seats, 35.6%	5 seats, 21.6%
Seats won	8	5	4
Seat change	▲2	▼4	▼1
Popular vote	8,289	6,158	3,897
Percentage	29.5%	21.9%	13.9%
Swing	▲8.3%	▼13.7%	▼7.8%
	Fourth party	Fifth party	Sixth party
	F	Æ	I
Party	Green Left	Denmark Democrats	Liberal Alliance
Last election	1 seat, 3.9%	Did not stand	0 seats, 0.9%
Seats won	2	2	1
Seat change	▲1	▲2	▲1
Popular vote	2,038	1,980	1,845
Percentage	7.3%	7.0%	6.6%
Swing	▲3.3%	New	▲5.7%
	Seventh party	Eighth party	Ninth party
	O	Ø	B
Party	Danish People's Party	Red-Green Alliance	Social Liberals
Last election	1 seat, 3.5%	1 seat, 4.7%	1 seat, 3.8%
Seats won	1	1	1
Seat change	0	0	0
Popular vote	1,337	1,288	1,133
Percentage	4.8%	4.6%	4.0%
Swing	▲1.2%	▼0.1%	▲0.2%
Mayor before election
Lars Storgaard
Conservatives
Mayor after election
Lars Storgaard
Conservatives

The 2025 Favrskov Municipal election was held on November 18, 2025, to elect the 25 members to sit in the regional council for the Favrskov Municipal council, in the period of 2026 to 2029. Lars Storgaard from Conservatives, would secure re-election.

== Background ==
Following the 2021 election, Lars Storgaard from Conservatives became mayor for his first term. Denmark Democrats, who stood for the first time at local elections, declared their support for him having a second term, prior the election.

== Electoral system ==
For elections to Danish municipalities, a number varying from 9 to 31 are chosen to be elected to the municipal council. The seats are then allocated using the D'Hondt method and a closed list proportional representation. Favrskov Municipality had 25 seats in 2025.

== Electoral alliances ==
=== Electoral Alliance 1 ===
Party		Political alignment
B	Social Liberals	Centre to Centre-left
F	Green Left	Centre-left to Left-wing
Ø	Red-Green Alliance	Left-wing to Far-Left
Å	The Alternative	Centre-left to Left-wing

=== Electoral Alliance 2 ===
Party		Political alignment
C	Conservatives	Centre-right
I	Liberal Alliance	Centre-right to Right-wing
O	Danish People's Party	Right-wing to Far-right
V	Venstre	Centre-right
Æ	Denmark Democrats	Right-wing to Far-right

== Results by polling station ==
Division	A	B	C	F	I	O	V	Æ	Ø	Å
Division	%	%	%	%	%	%	%	%	%	%
Hadsten Nord	24.7	3.7	32.1	7.7	7.8	4.5	9.3	5.4	4.2	0.6
Hadsten Syd	24.3	4.4	33.2	6.9	7.3	3.9	9.2	5.9	4.3	0.5
Hadbjerg	25.2	2.5	25.2	5.5	18.2	4.4	7.7	7.0	3.4	0.9
Hammel Nord	24.5	2.1	27.6	6.0	3.2	4.9	21.2	5.7	4.6	0.3
Hammel Syd	22.5	3.7	22.1	7.6	5.8	8.5	13.2	9.6	6.1	0.9
Haldum-Hinnerup/Vitten	25.0	6.1	17.0	11.0	8.7	3.7	14.5	7.2	6.0	0.7
Rønbæk/Grundfør	24.8	5.6	21.0	9.7	6.6	4.3	12.3	9.8	5.5	0.5
Foldby	20.3	13.8	19.9	7.8	6.7	6.9	11.2	8.2	4.6	0.6
Ulstrup	10.7	1.1	58.6	3.7	3.3	3.5	9.4	6.4	3.0	0.4
Thorsø/Haurum/Sall	14.5	1.5	43.7	5.2	4.7	5.6	14.3	7.8	2.6	0.2
Laurbjerg/Houlbjerg	15.8	2.1	25.1	6.2	8.9	5.9	15.2	10.8	9.5	0.6
Søften	21.2	5.3	33.2	8.7	4.1	3.8	16.6	4.6	2.1	0.4
Voldum	22.3	1.8	12.6	4.5	10.6	7.4	28.8	9.2	2.6	0.0
Lading	22.3	7.4	18.5	7.2	5.4	6.2	12.3	10.2	9.5	1.0

== Results ==
Party		Votes	%	+/-	Seats	+/-
Favrskov Municipality
C	Conservatives	8,289	29.49	+8.26	8	+2
A	Social Democrats	6,158	21.91	-13.68	5	-4
V	Venstre	3,897	13.87	-7.75	4	-1
F	Green Left	2,038	7.25	+3.32	2	+1
Æ	Denmark Democrats	1,980	7.05	New	2	New
I	Liberal Alliance	1,845	6.56	+5.67	1	+1
O	Danish People's Party	1,337	4.76	+1.25	1	0
Ø	Red-Green Alliance	1,288	4.58	-0.13	1	0
B	Social Liberals	1,133	4.03	+0.25	1	0
Å	The Alternative	140	0.50	New	0	New
Total		28,105	100	N/A	25	N/A
Invalid votes		76	0.20	+0.06		
Blank votes		374	0.99	+0.17		
Turnout		28,555	75.69	+2.58		
Source: valg.dk

== Opinion polls ==
Polling firm	Fieldwork date	Sample size	A	V	C	Ø	F	B	O	I	Å	Æ	Lead
Epinion	4 Sep - 13 Oct 2025	510	25.3	15.2	24.5	5.2	8.6	2.2	4.9	5.5	0.5	8.1	0.8
2024 european parliament election	9 Jun 2024		16.3	15.8	10.0	3.7	15.2	7.0	6.5	7.5	2.1	9.9	0.5
2022 general election	1 Nov 2022		28.6	15.0	6.2	3.1	7.4	3.5	2.3	8.1	2.1	9.8	13.6
2021 regional election	16 Nov 2021		34.3	26.0	12.7	4.9	4.8	3.9	3.7	1.3	0.5	–	8.3
2021 municipal election	16 Nov 2021		35.6 (9)	21.6 (5)	21.2 (6)	4.7 (1)	3.9 (1)	3.8 (1)	3.5 (1)	0.9 (0)	–	–	14.0
