= 2021 Favrskov municipal election =

← 2017	16 November 2021	2025 →

All 25 seats to the Favrskov Municipal Council 13 seats needed for a majority
- Turnout: 27,000 (64.6%) ▼2.9pp
	First party	Second party	Third party
	A	C	V
Party	Social Democrats	Conservatives	Venstre
Last election	11 seats, 43.1%	2 seats, 6.5%	9 seats, 29,7%
Seats won	9	6	5
Seat change	▼2	▲4	▼4
Popular vote	9,478	5,653	5,757
Percentage	35.6%	21.2%	21.6%
Swing	▼7.5%	▲14.7%	▼8.1%
	Fourth party	Fifth party	Sixth party
	Ø	F	B
Party	Red–Green Alliance	Green Left	Social Liberals
Last election	1 seat, 3.3%	1 seat, 2.8%	0 seats, 2.3%
Seats won	1	1	1
Seat change	0	0	▲1
Popular vote	1,254	1,048	1,007
Percentage	4.7%	3.9%	3.8%
Swing	▲1.4%	▲1.1%	▲1.5%
	Seventh party	Eighth party
	D	O
Party	New Right	Danish People's Party
Last election	0 seats, 0.6%	1 seat, 6,6%
Seats won	1	1
Seat change	▲1	0
Popular vote	942	935
Percentage	3.5%	3.5%
Swing	▲2.9%	▼3.1%
Mayor before election
Nils Borring
Social Democrats
Mayor after election
Lars Storgaard
Conservatives

Nils Borring from the Social Democrats was seeking a 4th term as mayor of Favrskov Municipality. The traditional red bloc won just 1 seat more than required in 2017, and therefore the results was expected to be tight.

In a surprise the Conservatives won 6 seats, an increase of 4 compared to 2017. Due to electoral alliances, the Conservatives would win a seat more than Venstre, who on the contrary lost 4 seats. With the Danish People's Party keeping their 1-seat and New Right also winning 1 seat, a seat majority between the blue bloc parties had been won. It was later announced that Lars Storgaard would become mayor, and be the first to do so from the Conservatives in Favrskov since the 2007 municipal reform, and he would also become the first mayor from the Conservatives, who had been elected in a municipality from the East Jutland constituency.

== Electoral system ==
For elections to Danish municipalities, a number varying from 9 to 31 are chosen to be elected to the municipal council. The seats are then allocated using the D'Hondt method and a closed list proportional representation. Favrskov Municipality had 25 seats in 2021

Unlike in Danish General Elections, in elections to municipal councils, electoral alliances are allowed.

== Electoral alliances ==
=== Electoral Alliance 1 ===
Party		Political alignment
D	New Right	Right-wing to Far-right
I	Liberal Alliance	Centre-right to Right-wing
O	Danish People's Party	Right-wing to Far-right

=== Electoral Alliance 2 ===
Party		Political alignment
B	Social Liberals	Centre to Centre-left
F	Green Left	Centre-left to Left-wing
Ø	Red–Green Alliance	Left-wing to Far-Left

=== Electoral Alliance 3 ===
Party		Political alignment
C	Conservatives	Centre-right
L	Samlingspartier Favrskov	Local politics

== Results by polling station ==
L = Samlingspartiet Favrskov

Division	A	B	C	D	F	I	L	O	V	Ø
Division	%	%	%	%	%	%	%	%	%	%
Hadsten Nord	32.6	4.8	22.6	2.9	3.5	1.4	2.5	3.9	20.7	5.0
Hadsten Syd	36.1	6.4	25.0	3.3	3.1	1.0	0.8	2.7	17.8	3.9
Hadbjerg	37.9	2.9	22.6	5.0	2.4	0.9	1.3	3.2	20.5	3.3
Hammel Nord	48.0	2.0	21.9	2.7	2.4	0.5	1.1	3.4	13.5	4.6
Foldby	32.2	12.2	14.1	4.0	5.0	1.5	1.2	5.3	18.1	6.4
Rønbæk/Grundfør	36.1	4.5	15.1	3.2	6.9	0.9	0.5	3.5	23.6	5.7
Hammel Syd	37.9	2.4	20.1	6.8	4.0	0.9	1.4	4.3	15.9	6.2
Haldum-Hinnerup/Vitten	35.9	5.1	13.4	2.2	7.8	1.3	1.2	2.7	24.2	6.1
Ulstrup	23.0	1.0	42.2	3.7	2.3	0.5	0.9	2.1	21.4	2.9
Thorsø/Haurum/Sall	30.3	1.2	29.4	5.5	2.3	0.6	1.1	4.9	21.0	3.7
Laurbjerg/Houlbjerg	30.0	2.3	9.5	3.6	3.2	0.8	1.1	4.3	38.1	7.1
Søften	35.4	4.5	17.9	2.3	4.7	0.9	0.7	3.2	27.8	2.6
Lading	33.5	4.5	10.9	5.3	3.1	1.5	1.6	3.4	28.4	7.8
Voldum	29.9	1.1	8.0	6.2	1.8	1.0	1.6	5.1	42.0	3.4

== Results ==
Party		Votes	%	+/-	Seats	+/-
Favrskov Municipality
A	Social Democrats	9,478	35.59	-7.49	9	-2
V	Venstre	5,757	21.62	-8.07	5	-4
C	Conservatives	5,653	21.23	+14.73	6	+4
Ø	Red-Green Alliance	1,254	4.71	+1.38	1	0
F	Green Left	1,048	3.94	+1.14	1	0
B	Social Liberals	1,007	3.78	+1.45	1	+1
D	New Right	942	3.54	+2.92	1	+1
O	Danish People's Party	935	3.51	-3.05	1	0
L	Samlingspartiet Favrskov	316	1.19	New	0	New
I	Liberal Alliance	239	0.90	-1.86	0	0
Total		26,629	100	N/A	25	N/A
Invalid votes		54	0.15	0.0		
Blank votes		317	0.86	+0.16		
Turnout		27,000	73.11	-2.87		
Source: valg.dk
