= 2025 Randers municipal election =

Municipal election in Denmark

- 18 November 2025

All 31 seats to the Randers municipal council 16 seats needed for a majority
- Turnout: 53,947 (67.4%) ▲2.8%
	First party	Second party	Third party
	A	V	F
Party	Social Democrats	Venstre	Green Left
Last election	12 seats, 34.2%	6 seats, 18.6%	1 seat, 5.1%
Seats won	7	5	5
Seat change	▼5	▼1	▲4
Popular vote	12,139	8,548	8,013
Percentage	22.9%	16.1%	15.1%
Swing	▼11.3%	▼2.5%	▲10.1%
	Fourth party	Fifth party	Sixth party
	Æ	O	Q
Party	Denmark Democrats	Danish People's Party	Østbroen
Last election	Did not stand	1 seat, 5.3%	2 seats, 7.8%
Seats won	3	3	2
Seat change	▲3	▲2	0
Popular vote	4,745	3,626	3,710
Percentage	9.0%	6.8%	7.0%
Swing	New	▲1.6%	▼0.8%
	Seventh party	Eighth party	Ninth party
	C	E	I
Party	Conservatives	Velfærdslisten	Liberal Alliance
Last election	4 seats, 11.1%	1 seat, 3.8%	0 seats, 0.9%
Seats won	2	1	1
Seat change	▼2	0	▲1
Popular vote	3,228	2,808	2,313
Percentage	6.1%	5.3%	4.4%
Swing	▼5.0%	▲1.5%	▲3.5%
Mayor before election
Torben Hansen
Social Democrats
Mayor after election
Rosa Lykke Yde
Green Left

The 2025 Randers Municipal election was held on November 18, 2025, to elect the 31 members to sit in the regional council for the Randers Municipal council, in the Danish city of Randers, in the period of 2026 to 2029. Rosa Lykke Yde from the Green Left, would win the mayoral position, taking the position from the Social Democrats.

== Background ==
Following the 2021 election, Torben Hansen from Social Democrats became mayor for his second term. He would run for a third period. Throughout the term period, the Conservatives lost representation, and was left with no seats.

== Electoral system ==
For elections to Danish municipalities, a number varying from 9 to 31 are chosen to be elected to the municipal council. The seats are then allocated using the D'Hondt method and a closed list proportional representation. Randers Municipality had 31 seats in 2025.

== Electoral alliances ==
=== Electoral Alliance 1 ===
Party		Political alignment
B	Social Liberals	Centre to Centre-left
J	Frie Stemmer - Jens Peter Hansen	Local politics
K	Christian Democrats	Centre to Centre-right

=== Electoral Alliance 2 ===
Party		Political alignment
C	Conservatives	Centre-right
I	Liberal Alliance	Centre-right to Right-wing
O	Danish People's Party	Right-wing to Far-right
Æ	Denmark Democrats	Right-wing to Far-right

=== Electoral Alliance 3 ===
Party		Political alignment
E	Velfærdslisten	Local politics
F	Green Left	Centre-left to Left-wing
Ø	Red-Green Alliance	Left-wing to Far-Left

=== Electoral Alliance 4 ===
Party		Political alignment
M	Moderates	Centre to Centre-right
V	Venstre	Centre-right

== Results by polling station ==
Division	A	B	C	E	F	I	J	K	M	O	Q	V	Æ	Ø
Division	%	%	%	%	%	%	%	%	%	%	%	%	%	%
Kulturhuset Langå	31.3	2.0	2.7	3.9	11.6	1.6	0.1	0.3	2.3	3.4	1.2	30.3	5.0	4.4
Stevnstrup Forsamlingshus	19.2	2.5	2.3	2.7	6.6	10.5	0.1	0.3	0.5	5.1	2.2	42.2	4.3	1.4
Jebjerg Forsamlingshus	21.5	1.6	3.9	3.0	9.7	2.8	1.6	1.4	1.8	6.3	3.7	25.6	14.0	3.0
Havndalhallen	51.3	0.4	4.8	2.5	4.3	2.6	0.0	0.0	0.4	3.8	3.4	8.5	17.4	0.5
Råby Forsamlingshus	28.8	1.0	3.9	2.0	4.7	3.7	0.3	0.0	0.3	6.5	19.3	5.2	21.4	2.8
Øster Tørslev Fritidslokaler	40.7	1.2	1.6	3.1	4.8	3.0	0.0	0.0	0.5	6.1	7.0	8.9	22.3	0.7
Korshøjskolen	20.1	4.0	5.1	3.2	11.1	3.0	0.2	0.5	0.9	5.6	19.1	12.8	13.0	1.4
Hald Forsamlingshus	17.4	2.2	4.1	5.9	9.9	5.5	0.6	0.4	1.0	10.5	6.7	12.2	22.7	1.0
Gjerlev Aktivitetshus	25.5	1.8	4.1	4.2	8.4	3.4	0.8	0.6	1.1	8.1	5.0	8.3	27.0	1.8
Rismølleskolen	19.2	1.8	4.6	6.7	16.9	3.8	0.1	0.4	0.7	5.3	19.5	12.7	6.1	2.1
Trekløverskolen	23.3	1.8	8.4	2.9	14.6	4.6	0.9	0.9	1.1	7.1	5.6	17.6	9.9	1.4
Hornbækhallen	21.6	2.7	14.0	2.4	12.6	5.2	0.2	0.6	1.3	4.6	3.3	24.6	5.6	1.2
Blicherskolen	24.5	2.0	4.4	6.3	12.2	4.8	1.2	0.4	0.7	9.9	5.4	13.7	13.3	1.2
Kultur-Aktivitetshuset Gassum	17.7	1.8	3.4	3.4	7.1	3.9	3.7	0.5	1.4	19.0	5.0	11.2	20.4	1.4
Asferg Træningshus	12.7	0.8	4.0	6.4	10.5	3.8	11.0	0.2	1.1	21.8	2.6	9.1	14.3	1.8
Purhushallen	8.9	1.6	1.6	2.2	41.3	4.1	0.3	0.7	0.7	11.5	3.4	8.4	14.3	0.8
Ø. Bjerregrav Forsamlingshus	20.8	0.9	8.0	3.9	15.9	3.6	0.0	0.7	0.9	7.1	4.2	19.6	13.0	1.3
Huset Tværs	22.8	2.4	5.8	7.3	19.9	3.4	0.2	0.4	1.1	7.0	6.6	13.2	5.3	4.5
Hobrovejens Skole	23.0	2.5	7.3	5.7	20.4	5.8	0.2	0.5	1.2	6.8	3.6	12.5	5.2	5.5
Randers Badmintonhaller	27.1	2.0	6.0	7.5	17.8	3.6	0.2	0.8	0.7	8.3	4.5	9.7	8.0	3.7
Nørrevangsskolen	28.4	2.1	3.5	8.4	15.8	3.3	0.2	0.5	1.1	9.1	5.2	7.7	7.5	7.4
Fritidscentret	19.5	2.5	8.9	7.6	18.9	5.1	0.4	0.5	1.6	6.1	4.4	12.6	5.6	6.2
Vestervangsskolen	28.4	2.1	7.0	6.7	17.0	4.0	0.2	0.6	1.2	6.2	3.6	12.5	6.4	4.2
Østervangsskolen	23.7	2.3	5.3	8.1	20.7	2.8	0.4	0.7	0.7	6.7	9.4	9.2	5.8	4.2
Søndermarkskolen	22.7	3.4	6.4	5.8	17.3	4.7	0.5	1.0	1.1	7.2	3.9	15.7	8.1	2.3
Tirsdalens Skole	21.8	2.3	6.4	6.0	17.7	4.1	0.1	0.9	1.3	6.3	9.0	14.9	7.0	2.2
Paderup Gymnasium	18.9	2.0	7.8	4.7	14.2	5.8	0.2	0.8	1.5	7.0	6.1	18.4	9.6	3.0
Romalt Aktivitetshal	18.7	2.4	4.6	3.6	13.8	5.0	0.3	0.4	1.0	6.1	5.3	29.2	8.0	1.5
Assentofthallen	15.3	1.9	9.2	3.1	11.3	5.5	0.5	1.1	1.3	5.2	15.0	19.6	9.8	1.4
Uggelhuse Forsamlingshus	11.9	1.8	4.3	5.2	11.4	3.4	0.4	0.5	0.5	3.2	30.5	7.8	16.6	2.3

== Results ==
Party		Votes	%	+/-	Seats	+/-
Randers Municipality
A	Social Democrats	12,139	22.92	-11.31	7	-5
V	Venstre	8,548	16.14	-2.46	5	-1
F	Green Left	8,013	15.13	+10.07	5	+4
Æ	Denmark Democrats	4,745	8.96	New	3	New
Q	Østbroen	3,710	7.00	-0.80	2	0
O	Danish People's Party	3,626	6.84	+1.59	3	+2
C	Conservatives	3,228	6.09	-5.03	2	-2
E	Velfærdslisten	2,808	5.30	+1.51	1	0
I	Liberal Alliance	2,313	4.37	+3.45	1	+1
Ø	Red-Green Alliance	1,536	2.90	+0.02	1	0
B	Social Liberals	1,171	2.21	-0.85	1	0
M	Moderates	571	1.08	New	0	New
K	Christian Democrats	315	0.59	-0.26	0	0
J	Frie Stemmer - Jens Peter Hansen	250	0.47	New	0	New
Total		52,973	100	N/A	31	N/A
Invalid votes		175	0.22	0.0		
Blank votes		799	1.00	+0.16		
Turnout		53,947	67.36	+2.77		
Source: valg.dk

== Opinion polls ==
Polling firm	Fieldwork date	Sample size	A	V	C	Q	O	F	E	B	Ø	I	K	J	M	Æ	Others	Lead
Epinion	4 Sep - 13 Oct 2025	414	27.3	17.5	3.2	–	8.2	12.2	–	1.4	2.5	9.6	–	–	1.0	10.2	7.0	9.8
2024 european parliament election	9 Jun 2024		19.3	14.3	7.9	–	8.7	14.2	–	4.3	4.7	7.4	–	–	5.9	11.2	–	5.0
2022 general election	1 Nov 2022		34.3	14.2	3.7	–	3.0	6.4	–	2.0	3.3	8.8	0.6	–	6.6	10.0	–	20.1
2021 regional election	16 Nov 2021		38.9	21.6	9.6	–	6.5	5.3	–	3.0	4.6	1.6	1.7	–	–	–	–	17.3
2021 municipal election	16 Nov 2021		34.2 (12)	18.6 (6)	11.1 (4)	7.8 (2)	5.3 (1)	5.1 (1)	3.8 (1)	3.1 (1)	2.9 (1)	0.9 (0)	0.9 (0)	–	–	–	–	15.6
