= Hvorslev =

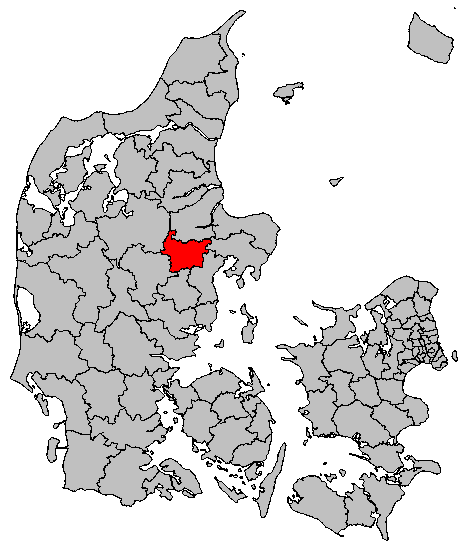
- Coordinates: 56°09′N 10°13′E
- Country: Denmark
- Region: Central Denmark (Midtjylland)
- Municipality: Favrskov

Area
  - Urban: 0.34 km^{2} (0.13 sq mi)

Population (2026)
  - Urban: 209
  - Urban density: 610/km^{2} (1,600/sq mi)
- Time zone: UTC+1 (Central Europe Time)
  - Summer (DST): UTC+2

Hvorslev is a Danish village of Region Midtjylland with a population of 209 (1 January 2026). It is, both with the towns of Hadsten, Hinnerup and Hammel, the administrative seat of Favrskov Municipality and until 1 January 2007 it was the seat of the former Hvorslev Municipality.

== See also ==
- Aldrup
- Vidstrup
