= 2021 Randers municipal election =

| ← 2017 | 16 November 2021 | 2025 → |

All 31 seats to the Randers Municipal Council 16 seats needed for a majority
- Turnout: 51,030 (64.6%) ▼5.1pp
| | First party | Second party | Third party |
|---|---|---|---|
| | A | V | C |
| Party | Social Democrats | Venstre | Conservatives |
| Last election | 13 seats, 37.8% | 9 seats, 26.1% | 1 seats, 4.1% |
| Seats won | 12 | 6 | 4 |
| Seat change | ▼1 | ▼3 | ▲3 |
| Popular vote | 17,175 | 9,333 | 5,580 |
| Percentage | 34.2% | 18.6% | 11.1% |
| Swing | ▼3.6% | ▼7.5% | ▲7.0% |
| | Fourth party | Fifth party | Sixth party |
| | Q | O | F |
| Party | Østbroen | Danish People's Party | Green Left |
| Last election | Did Not Stand | 3 seats, 8.3% | 1 seat, 4.2% |
| Seats won | 2 | 1 | 1 |
| Seat change | ▲2 | ▼2 | 0 |
| Popular vote | 3,917 | 2,635 | 2,539 |
| Percentage | 7.8% | 5.2% | 5.1% |
| Swing | New | ▼3.1% | ▲0.9% |
| | Seventh party | Eighth party | Ninth party |
| | Æ | D | B |
| Party | Velfærdslisten | New Right | Social Liberals |
| Last election | 1 seat, 4.0% | 0 seats, 0.6% | 1 seat, 2.8% |
| Seats won | 1 | 1 | 1 |
| Seat change | 0 | ▲1 | 0 |
| Popular vote | 1,904 | 1,881 | 1,537 |
| Percentage | 3.8% | 3.8% | 3.1% |
| Swing | ▼0.2% | ▲3.2% | ▲0.3% |
Mayor before election
Torben Hansen
Social Democrats
Mayor after election
Torben Hansen
Social Democrats

Torben Hansen from the Social Democrats, who became mayor following the 2017 election, attempted to be re-elected for this election. The parties of the nationwide red bloc lost a seat and only won 15 of the 31 seats, thus being one short of a majority. Instead of using the left of center majority, that could have been completed, with 2 local left-wing parties, Velfærdslisten and Beboerlisten, who won 1 and 2 seats respectively, the constitution, that would make Torben Hansen, would be across the political spectrum, and ended up including the Social Democrats, the Social Liberals, Conservatives, Danish People's Party and Venstre.

== Electoral system ==
For elections to Danish municipalities, a number varying from 9 to 31 are chosen to be elected to the municipal council. The seats are then allocated using the D'Hondt method and a closed list proportional representation. Randers Municipality had 31 seats in 2021

Unlike in Danish General Elections, in elections to municipal councils, electoral alliances are allowed.

== Electoral alliances ==
=== Electoral Alliance 1 ===
| Party | | Political alignment |
|---|---|---|
| A | Social Democrats | Centre-left |
| F | Green Left | Centre-left to Left-wing |

=== Electoral Alliance 2 ===
| Party | | Political alignment |
|---|---|---|
| B | Social Liberals | Centre to Centre-left |
| K | Christian Democrats | Centre to Centre-right |

=== Electoral Alliance 3 ===
| Party | | Political alignment |
|---|---|---|
| C | Conservatives | Centre-right |
| D | New Right | Right-wing to Far-right |
| I | Liberal Alliance | Centre-right to Right-wing |

=== Electoral Alliance 4 ===
| Party | | Political alignment |
|---|---|---|
| O | Danish People's Party | Right-wing to Far-right |
| V | Venstre | Centre-right |

=== Electoral Alliance 5 ===
| Party | | Political alignment |
|---|---|---|
| L | Beboerlisten | Local politics |
| Æ | Velfærdslisten | Local politics |
| Ø | Red–Green Alliance | Left-wing to Far-Left |

== Results by polling station ==
L = Beboerlisten

| Division | A | B | C | D | F | I | K | L | O | Q | V | Æ | Ø |
| Division | % | % | % | % | % | % | % | % | % | % | % | % | % |
|---|---|---|---|---|---|---|---|---|---|---|---|---|---|
| Kulturhuset Langå | 35.9 | 3.8 | 5.3 | 2.9 | 5.1 | 0.4 | 0.4 | 1.9 | 2.3 | 0.6 | 35.4 | 2.1 | 3.9 |
| Stevnstrup Forsamlingshus | 34.4 | 1.3 | 5.0 | 3.2 | 2.2 | 0.6 | 0.3 | 1.1 | 3.1 | 1.5 | 45.4 | 0.9 | 1.1 |
| Jebjerg Forsamlingshus | 27.2 | 2.5 | 10.2 | 5.5 | 4.5 | 0.6 | 1.1 | 1.5 | 5.1 | 2.5 | 35.0 | 1.7 | 2.5 |
| Havndalhallen | 58.7 | 0.9 | 11.0 | 6.0 | 1.5 | 0.2 | 0.1 | 1.2 | 3.6 | 2.2 | 11.0 | 2.3 | 1.2 |
| Råby Forsamlingshus | 42.6 | 1.6 | 14.1 | 9.1 | 2.2 | 0.5 | 0.2 | 0.8 | 5.1 | 6.6 | 12.0 | 1.6 | 3.5 |
| Øster Tørslev Fritidslokaler | 57.7 | 1.0 | 7.3 | 5.6 | 1.8 | 0.0 | 0.0 | 1.1 | 6.3 | 6.2 | 11.3 | 1.0 | 0.8 |
| Korshøjskolen | 23.9 | 3.3 | 8.8 | 3.3 | 3.8 | 0.4 | 0.3 | 0.9 | 4.7 | 26.7 | 18.7 | 3.4 | 1.9 |
| Hald Forsamlingshus | 32.3 | 2.5 | 9.0 | 4.7 | 3.5 | 1.0 | 0.7 | 2.6 | 12.5 | 8.8 | 16.5 | 4.6 | 1.3 |
| Hornbækhallen | 29.0 | 3.2 | 21.3 | 2.5 | 4.0 | 1.3 | 0.6 | 1.1 | 2.7 | 3.3 | 27.7 | 2.2 | 1.2 |
| Randers Specialskole (Firkløverskolen) | 35.1 | 3.0 | 16.5 | 3.5 | 5.4 | 0.9 | 1.1 | 2.3 | 4.8 | 4.0 | 19.4 | 3.1 | 1.0 |
| Rismølleskolen | 26.2 | 2.8 | 11.6 | 2.0 | 3.9 | 0.8 | 0.3 | 2.1 | 4.1 | 28.0 | 9.8 | 5.7 | 2.8 |
| Gjerlev Aktivitetshus | 39.6 | 3.6 | 7.5 | 9.1 | 3.6 | 1.0 | 1.1 | 2.4 | 7.7 | 2.9 | 16.0 | 2.9 | 2.6 |
| Blicherskolen | 39.9 | 1.9 | 8.2 | 4.0 | 3.0 | 0.4 | 0.3 | 1.6 | 7.8 | 5.6 | 22.3 | 3.8 | 1.4 |
| Kultur-Aktivitetshuset Gassum | 29.6 | 1.9 | 7.2 | 6.5 | 4.7 | 0.7 | 0.7 | 1.4 | 18.9 | 3.5 | 20.3 | 3.3 | 1.4 |
| Asferg Træningshus | 27.6 | 1.5 | 6.9 | 5.8 | 3.2 | 0.8 | 0.2 | 2.1 | 17.2 | 2.0 | 28.8 | 2.6 | 1.4 |
| Purhushallen | 36.6 | 0.8 | 3.8 | 6.6 | 13.4 | 0.3 | 0.8 | 0.6 | 9.5 | 1.0 | 23.1 | 2.5 | 1.0 |
| Randers Badmintonhaller | 40.8 | 3.3 | 8.9 | 4.1 | 5.8 | 0.6 | 1.0 | 4.7 | 6.7 | 4.9 | 10.6 | 5.1 | 3.5 |
| Hobrovejens Skole | 34.2 | 3.0 | 7.2 | 3.0 | 7.0 | 0.4 | 0.5 | 4.5 | 5.1 | 15.5 | 7.5 | 7.5 | 4.5 |
| Psykiatriens Hus | 32.3 | 3.6 | 11.6 | 3.2 | 7.0 | 0.8 | 0.7 | 4.2 | 4.8 | 8.1 | 11.6 | 6.8 | 5.3 |
| Ø. Bjerregrav Forsamlingshus | 33.0 | 2.0 | 9.2 | 4.2 | 5.1 | 1.0 | 0.9 | 1.5 | 7.6 | 2.8 | 27.8 | 2.8 | 2.1 |
| Nørrevangsskolen | 37.9 | 4.7 | 6.0 | 3.8 | 6.2 | 0.6 | 1.1 | 8.6 | 6.5 | 5.6 | 7.5 | 6.4 | 4.9 |
| Fritidscentret | 27.6 | 4.6 | 12.6 | 4.0 | 7.4 | 1.8 | 0.9 | 4.1 | 4.5 | 4.3 | 16.4 | 6.2 | 5.5 |
| Vestervangsskolen | 37.7 | 3.4 | 13.4 | 2.5 | 6.7 | 1.0 | 0.6 | 2.9 | 4.9 | 3.9 | 14.4 | 4.3 | 4.3 |
| Østervangsskolen | 34.2 | 3.0 | 7.2 | 3.0 | 7.0 | 0.4 | 0.5 | 4.5 | 5.1 | 15.5 | 7.5 | 7.5 | 4.5 |
| Romalt Aktivitetshal | 31.9 | 2.8 | 15.9 | 3.6 | 4.1 | 1.5 | 1.3 | 1.5 | 4.3 | 9.6 | 20.1 | 2.3 | 1.1 |
| Paderup Gymnasium | 27.2 | 3.3 | 13.0 | 4.2 | 3.4 | 1.2 | 2.0 | 2.8 | 5.8 | 11.3 | 21.9 | 1.5 | 2.4 |
| Kristrup Skole | 30.5 | 2.1 | 11.3 | 3.6 | 5.2 | 1.2 | 2.6 | 2.4 | 3.9 | 17.2 | 13.5 | 3.9 | 2.6 |
| Søndermarkskolen | 37.0 | 4.1 | 13.0 | 3.7 | 5.6 | 1.0 | 1.0 | 2.1 | 5.1 | 5.0 | 16.9 | 2.9 | 2.6 |
| Assentofthallen | 31.0 | 2.2 | 11.4 | 3.8 | 3.4 | 1.0 | 1.4 | 1.1 | 3.2 | 5.6 | 32.2 | 2.3 | 1.5 |
| Uggelhuse Forsamlingshus | 40.9 | 4.1 | 8.9 | 3.5 | 3.9 | 0.6 | 0.9 | 1.5 | 3.7 | 12.1 | 14.1 | 2.2 | 3.5 |

== Results ==
| Party | | Votes | % | +/- | Seats | +/- |
Randers Municipality
| A | Social Democrats | 17,175 | 34.23 | -3.52 | 12 | -1 |
| V | Venstre | 9,333 | 18.60 | -7.52 | 6 | -3 |
| C | Conservatives | 5,580 | 11.12 | +7.04 | 4 | +3 |
| Q | Østbroen | 3,917 | 7.81 | New | 2 | New |
| O | Danish People's Party | 2,635 | 5.25 | -3.07 | 1 | -2 |
| F | Green Left | 2,539 | 5.06 | +0.82 | 1 | 0 |
| Æ | Velfærdslisten | 1,904 | 3.79 | -0.24 | 1 | 0 |
| D | New Right | 1,881 | 3.75 | +3.15 | 1 | +1 |
| B | Social Liberals | 1,537 | 3.06 | +0.29 | 1 | 0 |
| Ø | Red-Green Alliance | 1,447 | 2.88 | +0.77 | 1 | 0 |
| L | Beboerlisten | 1,341 | 2.67 | -2.38 | 1 | 0 |
| I | Liberal Alliance | 458 | 0.91 | -0.68 | 0 | 0 |
| K | Christian Democrats | 428 | 0.85 | +0.14 | 0 | 0 |
| Total | | 50,175 | 100 | N/A | 31 | N/A |
| Invalid votes | | 170 | 0.22 | +0.04 | | |
| Blank votes | | 685 | 0.87 | +0.10 | | |
| Turnout | | 51,030 | 64.59 | -6.07 | | |
Source: valg.dk
