= Nørhald Municipality =

Former municipality of Denmark

Coordinates: 56°32′36″N 10°10′18″E

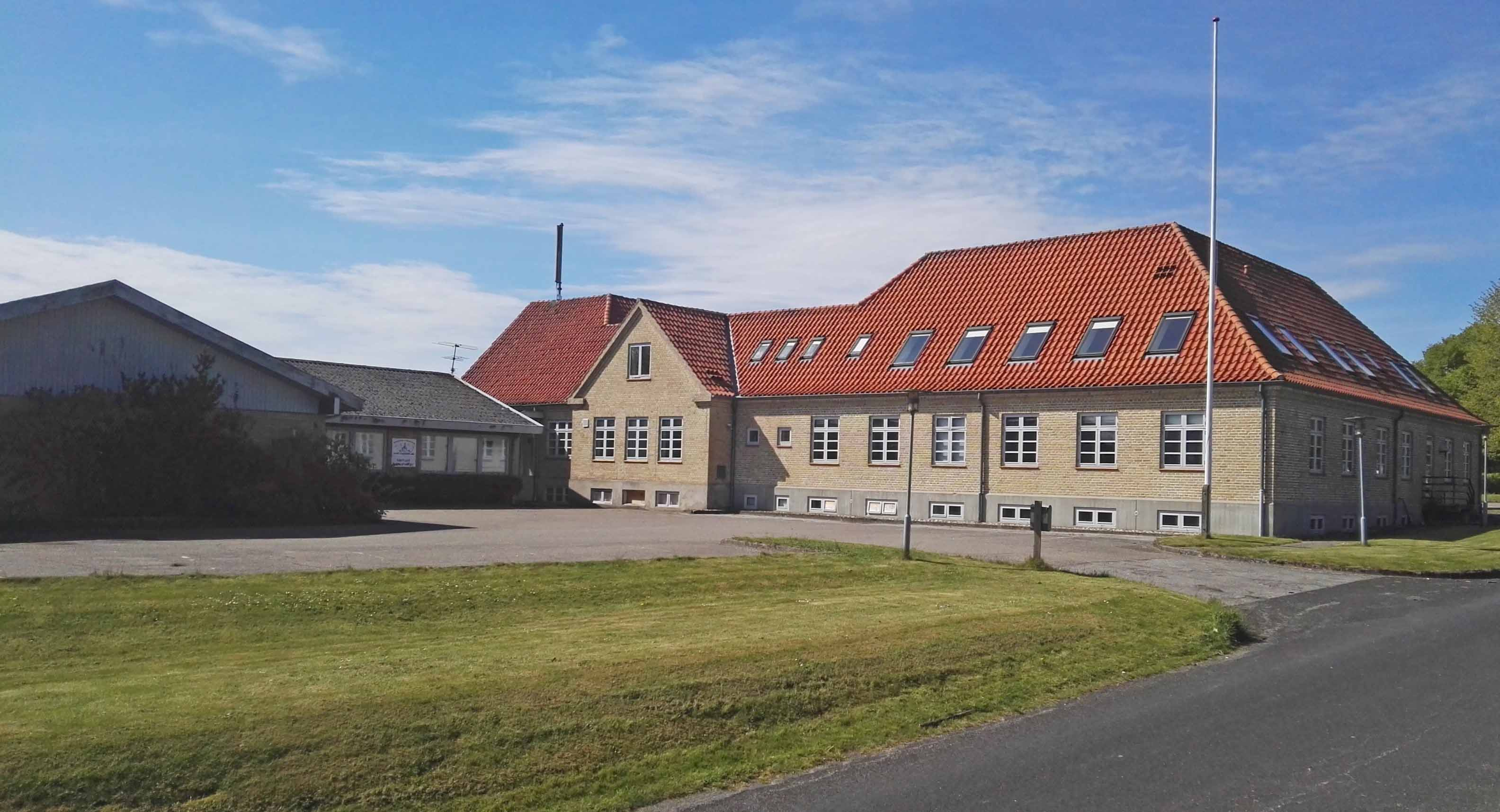
Nørhald Town Hall in Tvede

Until 1 January 2007 Nørhald municipality was a municipality (Danish, kommune) in the former Aarhus County on the east coast of the Jutland peninsula in central Denmark. The municipality covered an area of 201 km^{2}, and had a total population of 8,627 in 2005. Its last mayor was Anders Buhl-Christensen, a member of the Venstre (Liberal Party) political party. The main town and the site of its municipal council was the town of Tvede.

Nørhald municipality ceased to exist as the result of Kommunalreformen ("The Municipality Reform" of 2007). It was merged with Purhus, Randers, and a portion of each of the following municipalities— Langå, Sønderhald, and Mariager— to form an enlarged Randers municipality. This created a municipality with an area of 793 km^{2} and a total population of 96,409 (2005). The municipality belongs to Region Midtjylland ("Mid-Jutland Region").
