= Vestrup =

Vestrup may refer to:

- Vestrup, Central Denmark Region, a village in Randers Municipality, Denmark
- Vestrup, North Denmark Region, a village in Vesthimmerland Municipality, Denmark
