= Sall, Denmark =

Sall
- Village
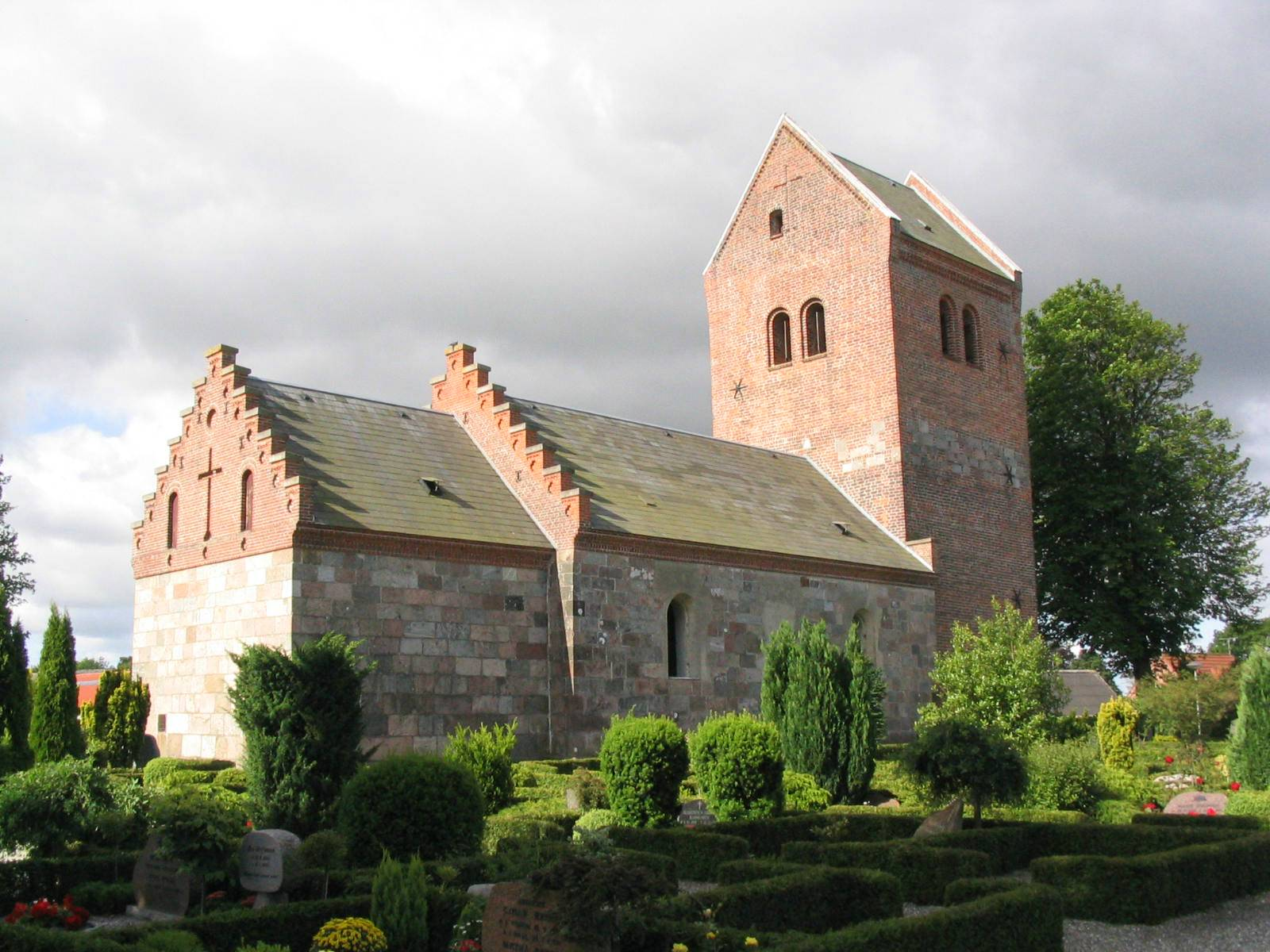
- Sall Church

- Location within Central Denmark Region Location within Denmark
- Coordinates: 56°16′43″N 9°49′30″E
- Country: Denmark
- Region: Central Denmark (Midtjylland)
- Municipality: Favrskov Municipality
- Parish: Sall Parish

Population (2026)
  - Village: 208

Sall is a village and a church parish in Favrskov Municipality in the Danish region of Midtjylland. In former times the village has been known as Sal, Sald (Pontoppidan) and Salle (Trap). The village itself has a population of 208 (1 January 2026) and is situated centrally in Sall Parish.

In the village there is a church belonging to the Church of Denmark, a village hall, and a primary school covering all ten classes with 185 pupils (22 May 2017). There is also a Kindergarten and a car repair shop. A whisky distillery using locally grown organic barley and fresh ground water is located in the village.

In the middle of the twentieth century the village had three grocery stores, a butcher, a baker, a post office and several other shops. They have since closed. From 1914 to 1956 Sall was a railway town on the railway line Aarhus-Hammel-Thorsø.

== Notable residents ==
- Jacob Jensen, (Danish Wiki) (1819 in Sall – 1882), a member of parliament and a teacher in Sall from 1847–1882.
