= Thorsø =

Thorsø may refer to

- Thorsø, Denmark
- Thorsø, Norway
