= Spentrup =

- Town
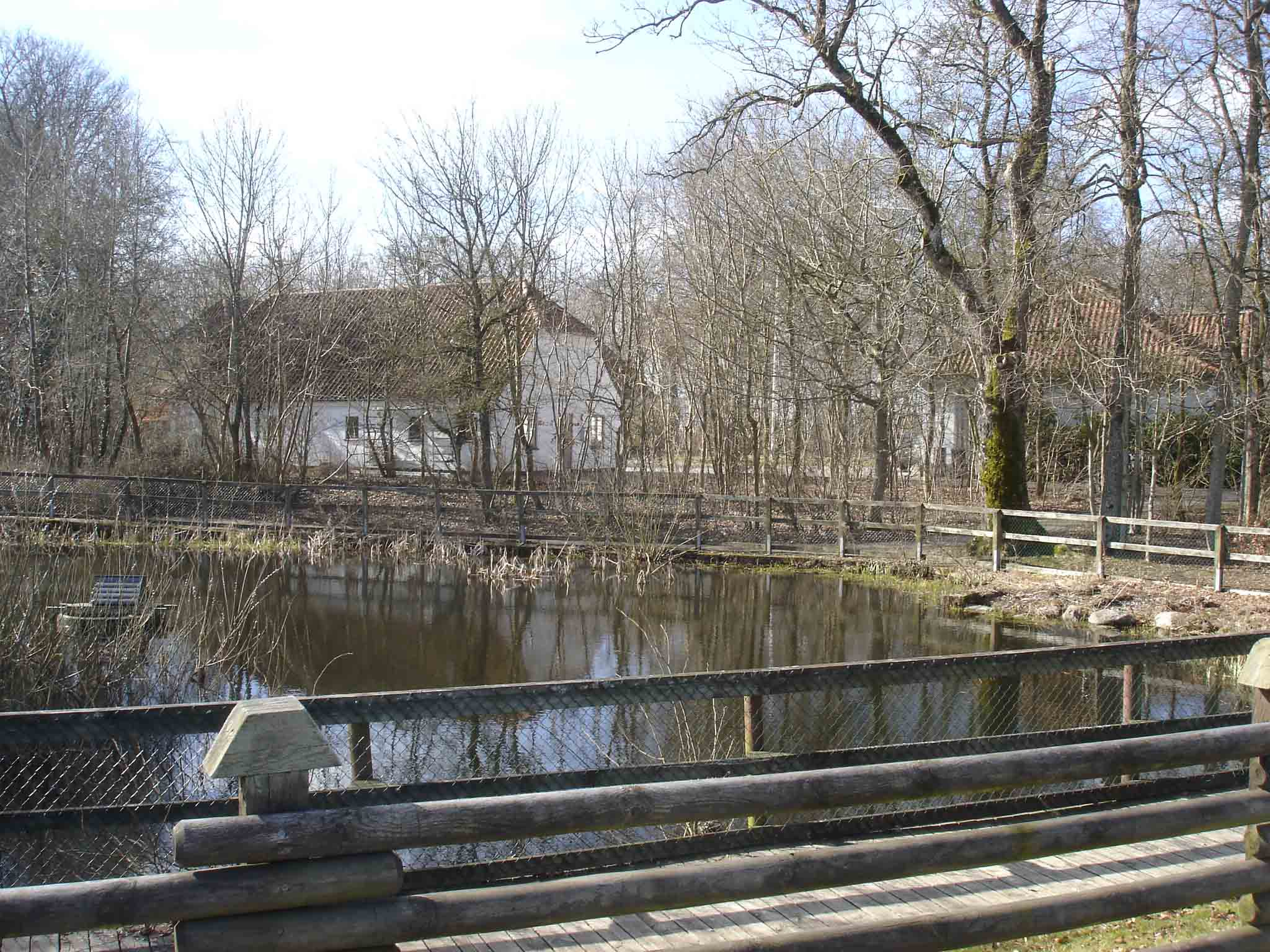
- Manse and parish house behind the village pond

- Spentrup's position Spentrup (Central Denmark Region)
- Coordinates: 56°32′25″N 10°2′17″E
- Country: Denmark
- Region: Central Jutland Region
- Municipality: Randers Municipality
- Parish: Spentrup Parish

Area
  - Urban: 1.4 km^{2} (0.54 sq mi)

Population (2026)
  - Urban: 2,360
  - Urban density: 1,700/km^{2} (4,400/sq mi)
- Time zone: UTC+1 (CET)
  - Summer (DST): UTC+2 (CEST)
- Postal code: DK-8981 Spentrup
- Website: www.randers.dk

Spentrup is a town in East Jutland, with a population of 2,360 (1 January 2026), located 15 kilometres (9.3 mi) south of Mariager, 26 kilometres (16 mi) southwest of Hadsund and 10 kilometres (6.2 mi) north of Randers. The town belongs to Randers Municipality and is located in the Central Denmark Region.

Spentrup belongs to Spentrup Parish, and Spentrup Church is located in the town's old village center.

The town is especially known for being Steen Steensen Blicher's hometown from 1825 until his death in 1848. Therefore, both the school and the local scout group are named after Blicher.

== Facilities ==
As of 2018, Blicher School had 598 students, divided into 0-9th grades in 2-3 tracks. Blichers Children's Village SFO is an after-school activity for 0-3rd grade. Randers Youth School has teams running at Blicher School. The first Spentruphal was built in 1980, but has been continuously renovated. Hall 2 is from 2008, and in 2009 the sandwich bar was renovated and a gym/fitness area established. The halls are used for many sports, especially by the city's sports association Spentrup IF and by the city's badminton club, SBK.

The listed Hvidsten Inn, home to the famous Hvidsten Group during World War II, is located 3 kilometres (1.9 mi) northwest of the town.

== History ==
=== The equestrian school ===
One of Frederik IV's rytterskoler ("rider schools" or "cavalry schools") was built in Spentrup in 1722. In 1890 it was supplemented by a pogeskole for the smallest children. A stable building constructed in 1918 was converted into classrooms in 1959, and in 1964 the teacher's residence was also converted into classrooms. The rytterskole was replaced by the newly built Blicher School on 1 August 1969 and thus came to serve as a school for 248 years, which is longer than any other rytterskole. The king's sandstone board with the reason for setting up the schools still sits on the façade and has never been moved from there, which is also quite unique. The school is located on Stationsvej 42 and is now a private residence.

=== Steen Steensen Blicher ===
The writer Steen Steensen Blicher was a priest in Spentrup from 1825 to 1847 and is buried in the town's churchyard. He lived in the manse, which was built in 1794-95 and was listed in 1918. Malvina's House, originally a tenant's residence for the vicarage, is named after Blicher's youngest daughter, who lived there. The house is decorated as a memorial for Blicher. The church, the vicarage and Malvina's House, together with the equestrian school, provide a fine historical environment by the gadekær (the artificial body of water in the middle of the village).

=== The station town ===
Spentrup had a train station on the Randers-Hadsund Railway (1883-1969). The station was built between Spentrup and the older neighboring village of Jennum, 0.75 kilometres (0.47 mi) from each. The village of Spentrup grew together with the settlement that originated around the station, but Jennum is still a village of about 80 inhabitants, and according to the municipal plan it should not grow together with Spentrup.

In 1901 Spentrup is described as follows: "Spentrup med Kirke, Præstegd., Skole, Sparekasse (opr. 1871...), Kro, Jærnbane- og Telegrafst." The measuring table sheet from the 19th century also shows a midwife's house, and that from the 1900s shows a mission house that still exists and is now a second-hand shop.

The station had bypass/loading tracks. The station building is preserved on Bane Alle 2 B. From here, the track's tracé is preserved as a path of 7.5 kilometres (4.7 mi) to Dronningborg Sports Center. Northeast of Spentrup in the direction of Hald, 2.5 kilometres (1.6 mi) of tracé is preserved to Spentrupvej, but a little less accessible.

=== The municipality ===
Spentrup Parish, which belonged to Nørhald Herred (one of the hundreds of Denmark), was part of the 1970 Danish Municipal Reform in Purhus Municipality. Spentrup was greatly expanded with neighborhoods of single-family detached homes from the mid-1960s and especially during the 1970s. It quickly overtook the municipality seat of Fårup as the municipality's largest city and became one of the largest satellite cities for Randers. In 2007, Purhus Municipality became part of Randers Municipality.
