= Vestrup, Central Denmark Region =

Vestrup
- Location in Denmark
- Coordinates: 56°28′45″N 10°08′10″E
- Country: Denmark
- Region: Central Denmark (Midtjylland)
- Municipality: Randers

Government
  - Mayor: Claus Omann Jensen
- Time zone: UTC+1 (Central Europe Time)
  - Summer (DST): UTC+2
- Postal code: 8930

Vestrup is a village in Randers Municipality, Central Denmark Region, Denmark. It is one of two villages of the name in Denmark; the other Vestrup is in North Jutland. It has an old farm with the name Skjødtgården, around 250 years old. Today the farm is part of the campaign 'farms worthy of preservation' (Bevaringsværdige Gårdejendomme).
