= Hvorslev Municipality =

Former municipality in Denmark

Coordinates: 56.366°N 9.767°E

Until 1 January 2007 Hvorslev municipality was a municipality (Danish, kommune) in Viborg County in central Denmark. The municipality covered an area of 128 km^{2}, and had a total population of 6,900 (2005). Its last mayor was Kurt Andreasen, a member of the Venstre (Liberal Party) political party. The largest town was the town of Ulstrup and the village of Hvorslev was the municipal seat.

Hvorslev municipality ceased to exist due to Kommunalreformen ("The Municipality Reform" of 2007). It was merged with Hadsten, Hinnerup, and Hammel municipalities, as well as the southern part of Langå municipality to form the new Favrskov municipality. This created a municipality with an area of 487 km^{2} and a total population of ca. 41,596 (2005). The new municipality belongs to Region Midtjylland ("Mid-Jutland Region").
