= Hadsten Municipality =

Former municipality of Denmark

Coordinates: 56°20′N 10°03′E

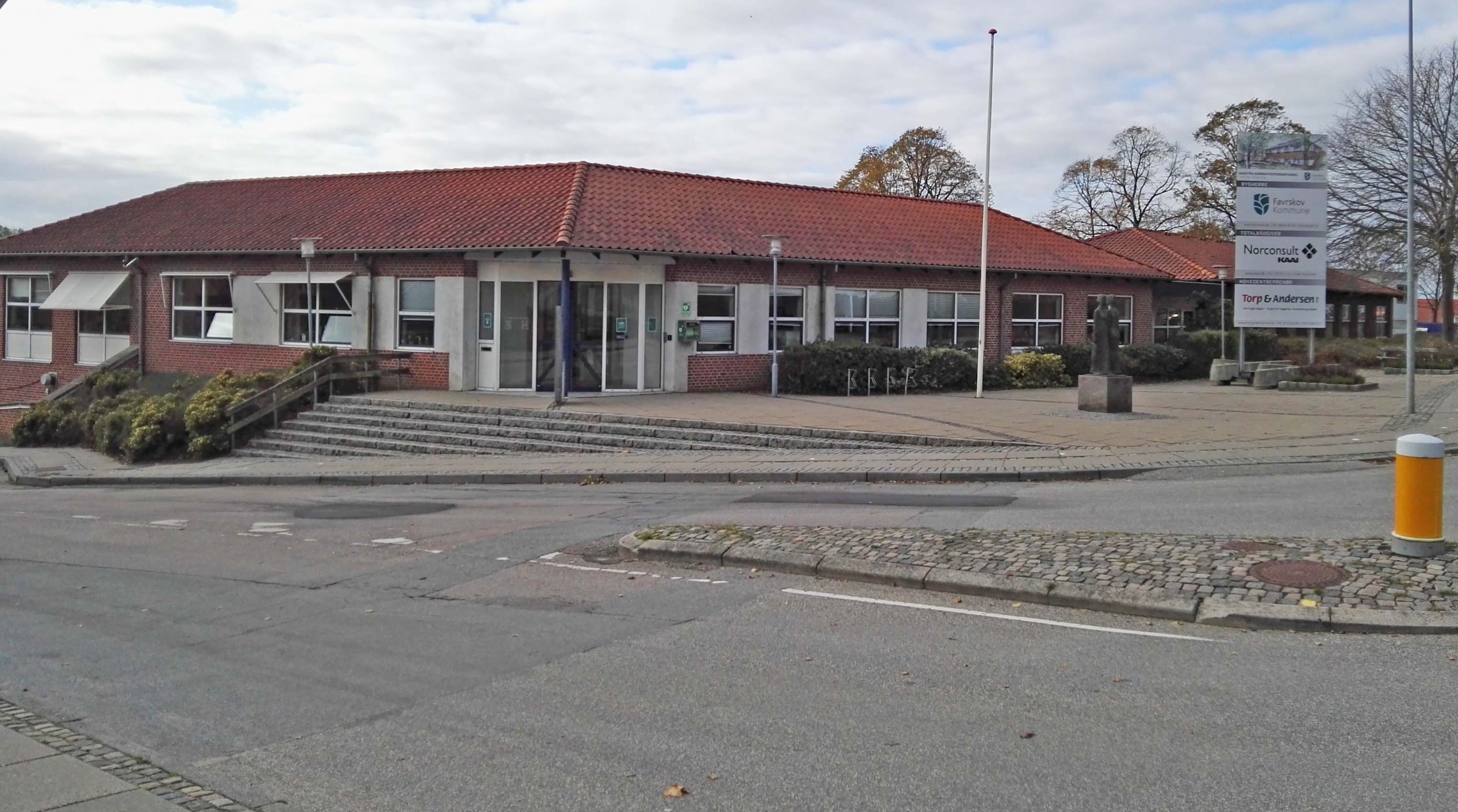

Hadsten municipality was a municipality (Danish, kommune) in Aarhus County on the Jutland peninsula in central Denmark until 1 January 2007. The municipality covered an area of 139 km^{2}, and had a total population of 11.818 (2005). Its last mayor was Anders G. Christensen, a member of the Venstre (Liberal Party) political party. The main town and site of its municipal council was Hadsten.

The Little River (Lilleå) runs through the former municipality, and through the center of the town of Hadsten.

Hadsten municipality ceased to exist due to Kommunalreformen ("The Municipality Reform" of 2007). It was merged with Hammel, Hinnerup, and Hvorslev municipalities, as well as the southern part of Langå municipality to form the new Favrskov municipality. This created a municipality with an area of 487 km^{2} and a total population of ca. 41,596 (2005). The new municipality belongs to Region Midtjylland ("Mid-Jutland Region").

== Constructions ==
- Hadsten Transmitter, one of the tallest towers in Denmark.
