= Hinnerup Municipality =

Former municipality of Denmark

Coordinates: 56.2651°N 10.0624°E

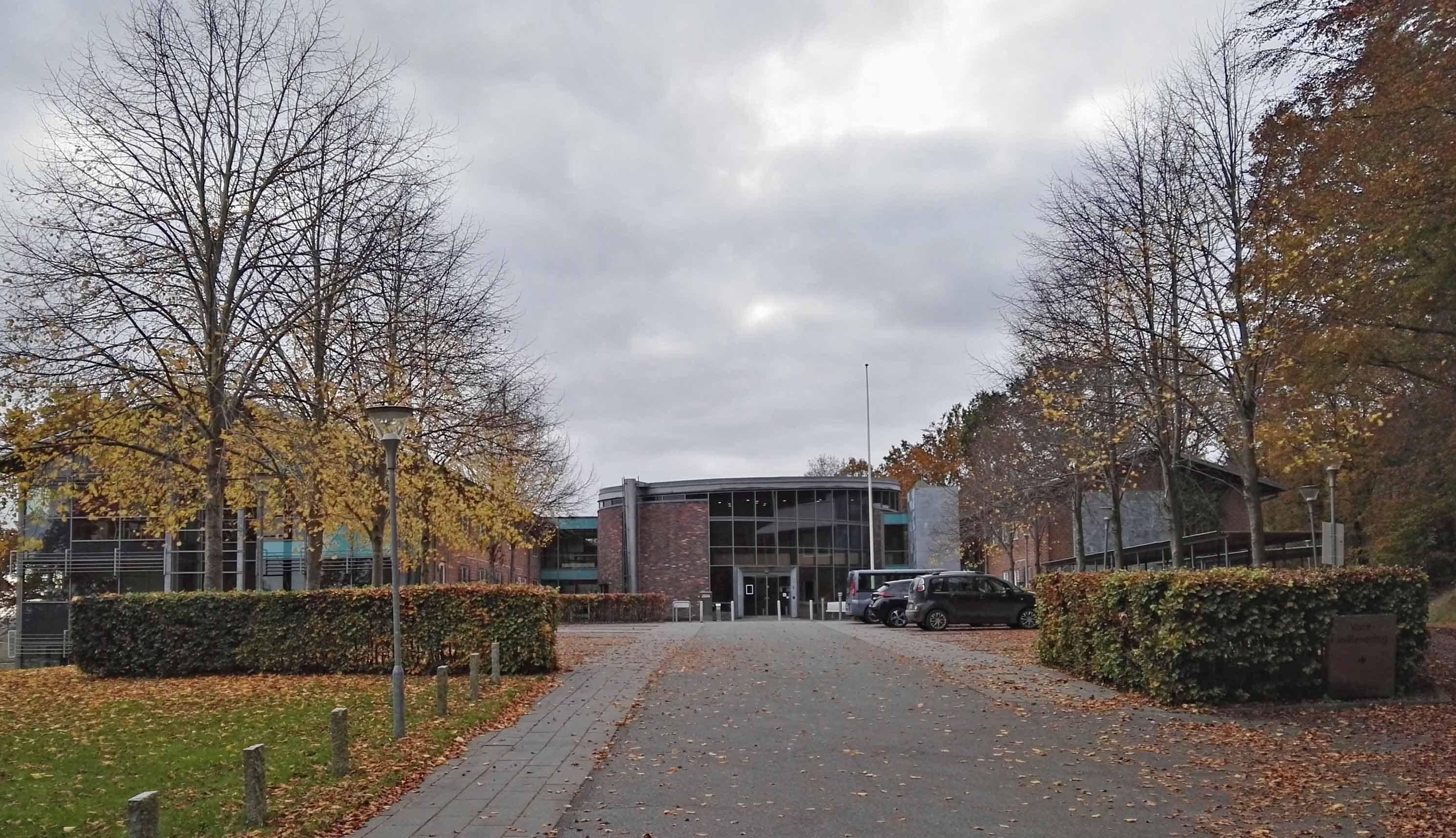
Hinnerup city hall

Until 1 January 2007 Hinnerup municipality was a municipality (Danish, kommune) in Aarhus County on the Jutland peninsula in central Denmark. The municipality covered an area of 76 km^{2} (29 sq mi), and had a total population of 12,048 in 2005. Its last mayor was Niels Berg, a member of the Venstre (Liberal Party) political party. The main town and site of its municipal council was the town of Hinnerup.

Hinnerup municipality ceased to exist due to Kommunalreformen ("The Municipality Reform" of 2007). It was merged with Hadsten, Hammel and Hvorslev municipalities, as well as the southern part of Langå municipality, to form the new Favrskov municipality. This created a municipality with an area of 487 km^{2} (188 sq mi) and a total population of ca. 41,596 (2005). The new municipality belongs to Region Midtjylland ("Mid-Jutland Region").
