= Hammel Municipality =

Former municipality in Denmark

Coordinates: 56°15′N 9°52′E

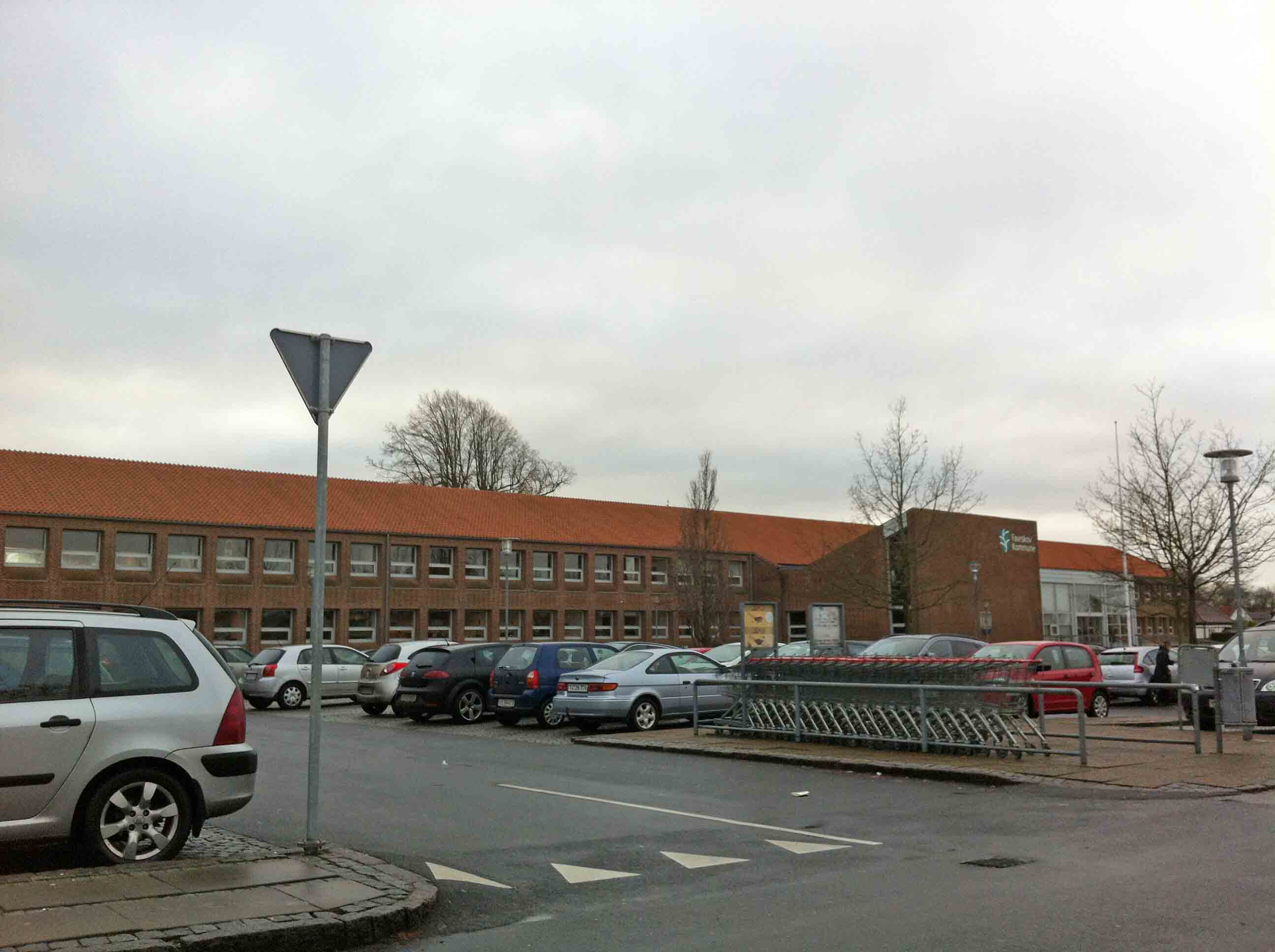

Until 1 January 2007 Hammel municipality was a municipality (Danish, kommune) in Aarhus County in central Denmark. The municipality covered an area of 144 km^{2}, and had a total population of 10.830 (2005). Its last mayor was Ole Brøkner, a member of the Conservative People's Party (Det Konservative Folkeparti) political party. The main town and site of its municipal council was the town of Hammel.

The municipality was created in 1970 due to a kommunalreform ("Municipality Reform") that combined a number of existing parishes:

- Hammel Parish
- Haurum Parish
- Lading Parish
- Røgen Parish
- Sall Parish
- Skjød Parish
- Søby Parish
- Sporup Parish
- Voldby Parish

Hammel municipality ceased to exist due to Kommunalreformen ("The Municipality Reform" of 2007). It was merged with existing Hadsten, Hinnerup, and Hvorslev municipalities, as well as the southern part of Langå municipality to form the new Favrskov municipality. This created a municipality with an area of 487 km^{2} and a total population of ca. 41,596 (2005). The new municipality belongs to Region Midtjylland ("Mid-Jutland Region").
