= Øster Bjerregrav =

- Town
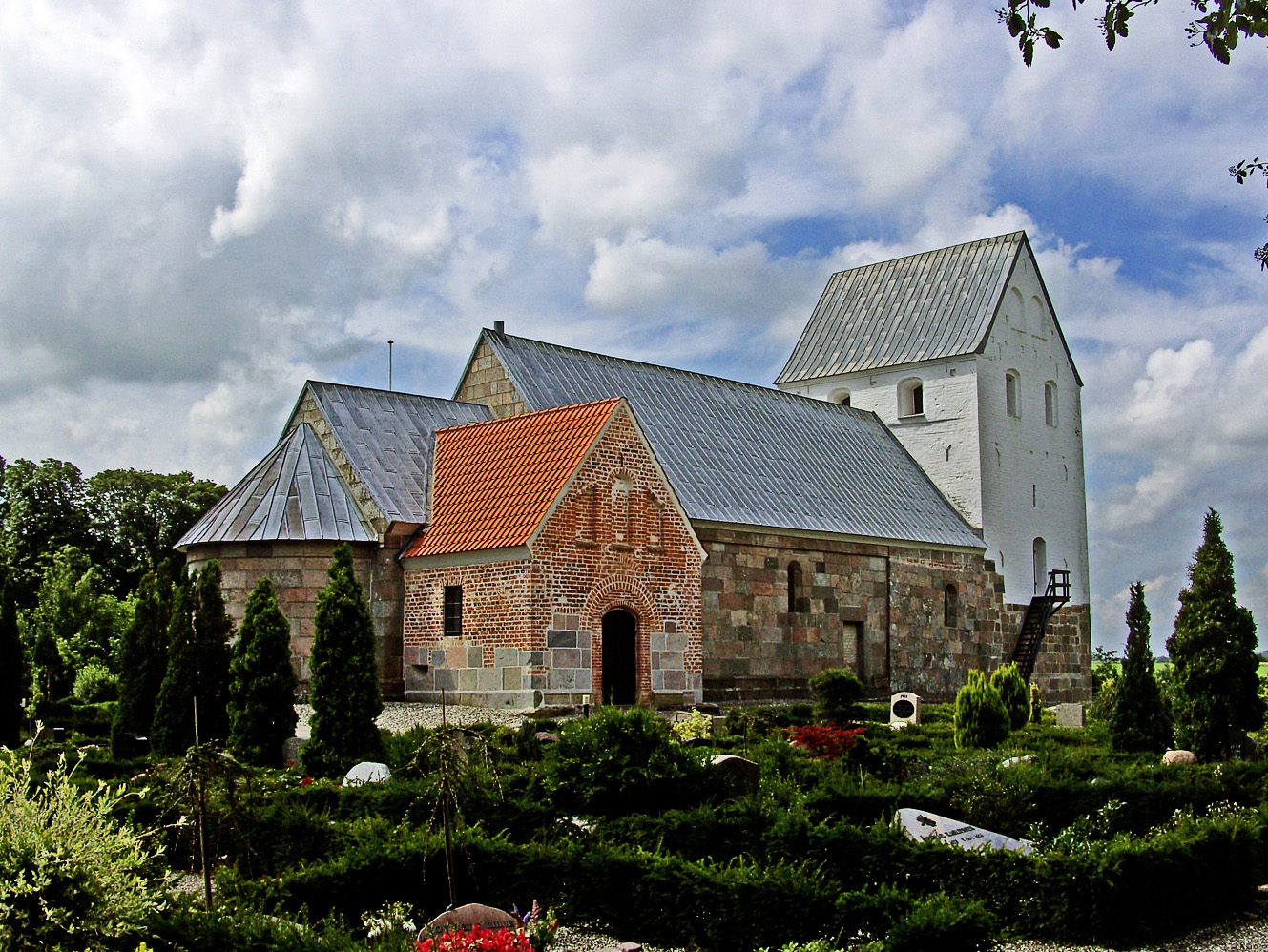
- Øster Bjerregrav Church

- Location in Denmark Øster Bjerregrav (Central Denmark Region)
- Coordinates: 56.48550°N 9.90853°E
- Country: Denmark
- Region: Central Denmark (Midtjylland)
- Municipality: Randers Municipality

Area
  - Urban: 0.8 km^{2} (0.31 sq mi)

Population (2026)
  - Urban: 1,013
  - Urban density: 1,300/km^{2} (3,300/sq mi)
- Time zone: UTC+1 (CET)
  - Summer (DST): UTC+2 (CEST)
- Postal code: DK-8900 Randers NV

Øster Bjerregrav is a small town, with a population of 1,013 (1 January 2026), in Randers Municipality, Central Denmark Region in Denmark. It is situated just northeast of Fussing Sø (Fussing Lake), 8 km west of Randers and 33 km east of Viborg.

== Øster Bjerregrav Church ==
Øster Bjerregrav Church is located on the northern outskirts of the town. Two runestones, both dated to the late Viking Age between the years 970–1020, were found in the church porch where they were used as parts of the floor.

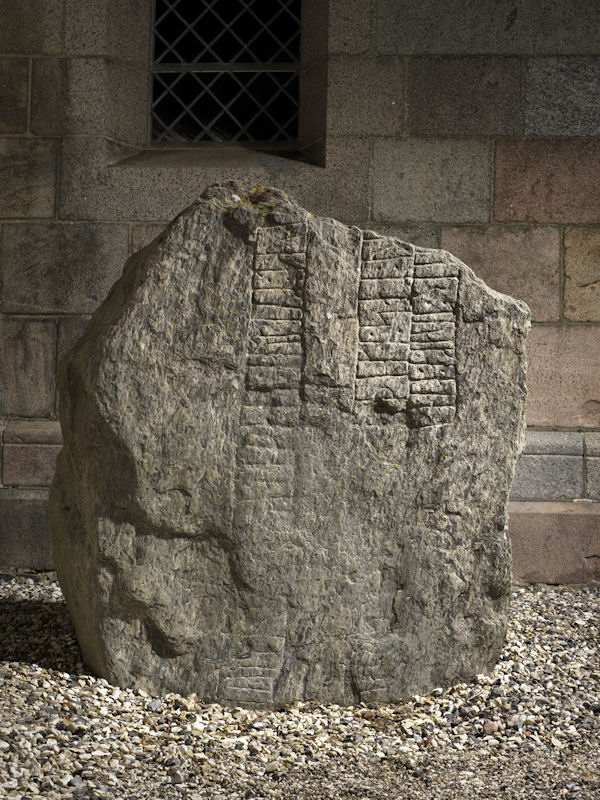
The Øster Bjerregrav Stone I placed outside the church at the corner between the church porch and the nave

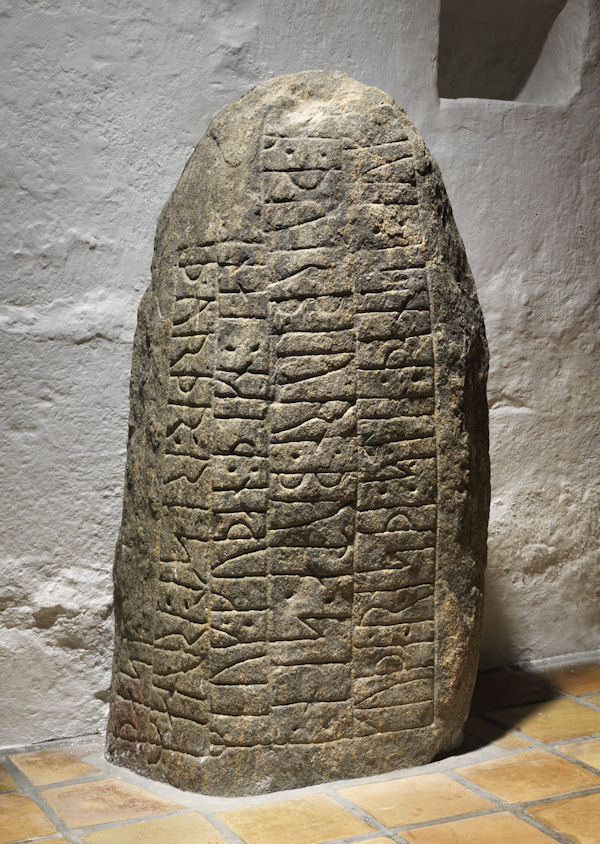
The Øster Bjerregrav Stone 2 placed inside the church porch
