= Vestrup, North Denmark Region =

Vestrup
- Location in Denmark
- Coordinates: 56°44′55″N 9°26′50″E
- Country: Denmark
- Region: North Denmark
- Municipality: Vesthimmerland

Population (2016)
  - Total: Around 32
- Time zone: UTC+1 (Central Europe Time)
  - Summer (DST): UTC+2
- Postal code: 9600

Vestrup is a village in Vesthimmerland Municipality, North Denmark Region, Denmark. It is one of two villages of the name in Denmark; the other Vestrup is in Central Jutland. The village has a school, Vestrup School, along with a kindergarten, a day care facility and two burial mounds.

== School ==
The school's main building was built in 1963 and in 2009 supplemented by a primary school building containing classrooms for kindergarten and first grade and a special education room and two toilets. In 2009, the schoolyard toilets have undergone extensive renovation. In August 2008, the school inaugurated a new playground and activity courses. There are classrooms for music, art, woodwork, home economics, school library and sports.

== Former missionary house ==
In the town, there is a former missionary house, that during World War 2 was used by the Nazis after Denmark had been occupied. The house was used as a post where they could sleep. Today the house is used as a normal house.
