= Tvede =

Tvede is a Danish surname. Notable people with the name include:

- Gotfred Tvede (1863–1947), Danish architect
- Jens Levin Tvede (1830–1891), Danish destiller and politician
- Julie Tvede (born 1980), Danish golfer
- Vilhelm Tvede (1826–1891), Danish architect
