= Niels Hjersing Clementin =

Danish actor

Niels Hjersing Clementin (1721-1776), was a Danish actor. Although he originally studied theology, he became an elite actor of the Royal Danish Theatre in 1747-76 and belonged to the pioneer generation of the acting profession in Denmark and of the Royal stage. He was foremost known for his comical roles within the plays of Holberg and Molière, in which he became a role model.
