= Søften =

- Town
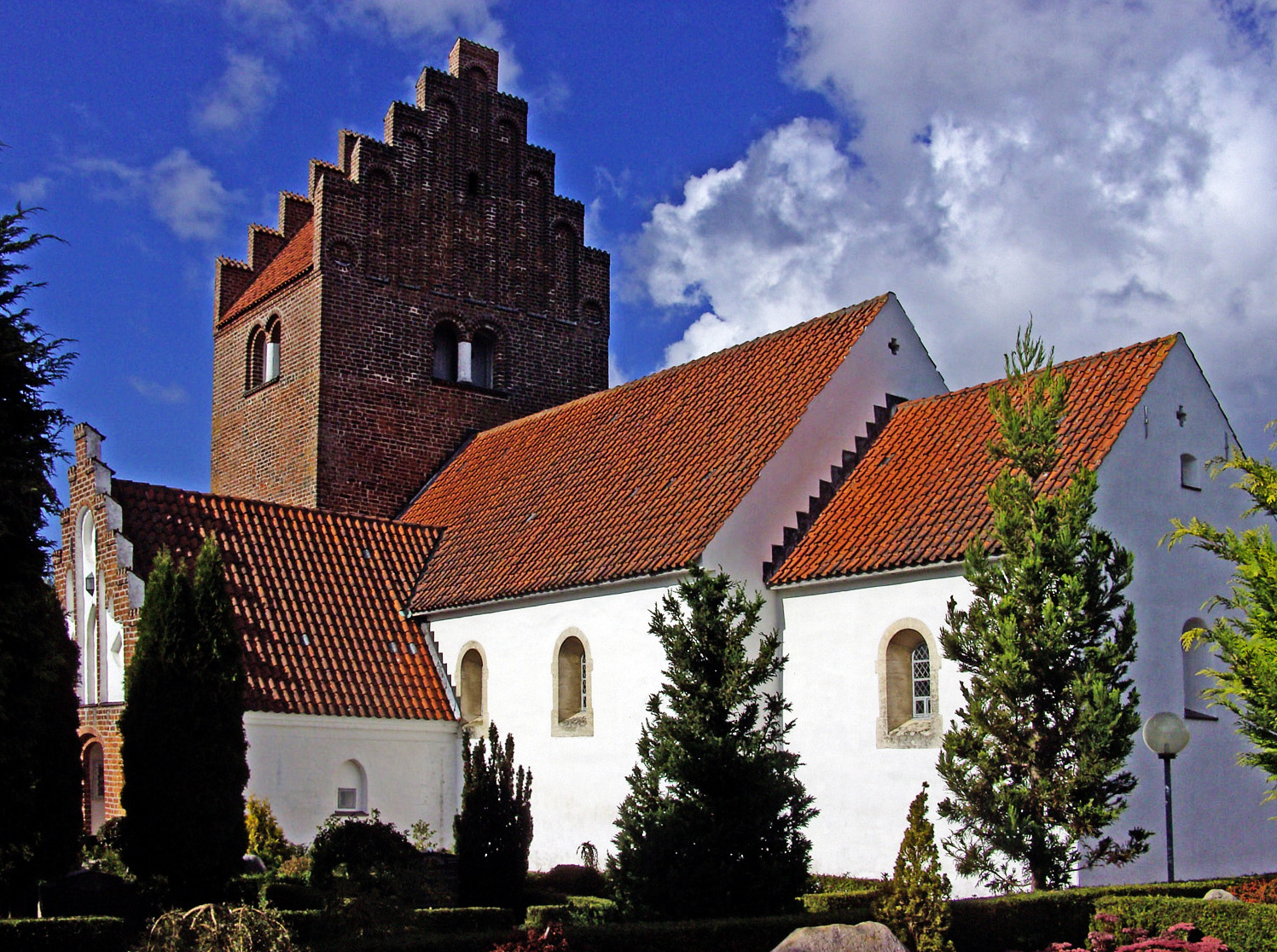
- Søften church

- Location in Denmark Søften (Central Denmark Region)
- Coordinates: 56°14′18″N 10°05′34″E
- Country: Denmark
- Region: Region Midtjylland
- Municipality: Favrskov Municipality

Area
  - Urban: 2.2 km^{2} (0.85 sq mi)

Population (2026)
  - Urban: 3,169
  - Urban density: 1,400/km^{2} (3,700/sq mi)
  - Gender: 1,556 males and 1,613 females
- Time zone: UTC+1 (CET)
  - Summer (DST): UTC+2 (CEST)
- Postal code: DK-8382 Hinnerup

Søften (alternative spellings include Suten–1386, Suchten–1399, and Søwten–1489) is a small Danish town in Jutland, roughly three kilometers south of Hinnerup and just northwest of Aarhus. Søften has a population of 3,169 (1 January 2026). Archaeological surveys of the area indicate the earliest settlements dates to the Nordic Iron Age.

== Geography ==
Søften is located within an area defined by a small river valley. The river valley, formed topographically due to Weichselian glaciation during the last ice age, and runs along the North and West sides of Søften city. The area is relatively hilly (by Danish standards), with slopes leading towards the river valley north of Søften. The narrow wetland of Damsbro Mose runs along the northeast and southwest sides of Søften Valley.

=== Damsbro Mose ===
Damsbro Mose is a wetland area, with a very high water table, encompassing both banks of the river Lilleå between Søften and Hinnerup. The large marshland area is a mixture of rich fen, swamp forest, lakes in the form of old gravel pits and fertilized cultivated meadows.

==== Fauna and flora ====
In the southern part of the marsh, the vegetation consists of species such as lesser pond sedge, greater tussock sedge, tussock grass, common reed, reed canary grass, reed mace, willow and alder. In the middle of the marshland area is a section along the river with holy grass. Some parts of the marsh’s northern areas have the wettest ground with a wide range of plant life such as obtuse-flowered rush, bottlesedge, two-ranked sedge, marsh bird’s-foot trefoil, European swamp thistle, lesser pond sedge, perennial sedge, meadowsweet, northern water hemlock, bog-bean, great water dock, great spearwort, ragged robin, globe-flower and St Peter’s wort. In the drier areas with small hillocks can be found an exciting lowflora such as star sedge and greater yellow-rattle. Flea sedge and salt marsh flat sedge are common. On and around the hillocks are hawkweed, quaking grass, marsh arrowgrass, marsh grass-of-Parnassus, western marsh-orchid as well as the rare valerian. The marsh is also a habitat for bird species such as the marsh warbler, common grasshopper warbler, nightingale, common snipe, common kestrel, lesser whitethroat, whitethroat, coal tit, willow warbler and the lesser redpoll.

== History and culture ==
The open marsh landscape was recreated during the Second World War due to the removal of peat on a large scale in the area. From these excavations, the remains of a woman and a young child were found in the marsh, dating to the Nordic Iron Age. Afterwards, remains of a settlement were discovered when building Engdalsvej. During these excavations, traces of dwellings were discovered with preserved stone pavings and pits from the pre-Roman Iron Age. A plan was drawn up for nature and countryside preservation by Naturplan APS for the Municipality of Hinnerup and the County of Aarhus in 1991. In 1992, the Municipality of Hinnerup and the County of Aarhus (which no longer exists) began implementing various initiatives to safeguard the natural values of the marsh. It is possible to walk the entire length of the marsh following paths between Hinnerup and Søften.

=== Søften Church ===
==== Location and development ====
The Søften Church is one of the oldest Danish buildings and lies on a west-facing slope, where the terrain opens into the valley. The church was originally erected in the late 12th century with later additions over the centuries. Søften church consists of a Romanesque chancel and nave with two Late Gothic additions: a porch at the south door and to the west tower. The Romanesque section was built between 1500-1200 of rough, hewn travertine, split granite boulders as well as bryozoan limestone. Mainly clay seems to have been used as a binding agent. A cross-vault was constructed c. 1462 in the chancel as were three vaulting bays in the nave. During the church’s restoration by the architect M.B. Fritz in 1928, the tower gable and the windows from 1898 were reconstructed. The wall paintings in the vaulting of the church from the 1460s have the armorial bearings of the Bishop of Aarhus Jens Iversen Lange (1449–82). The nave decoration is from the end of the 15th century, while the tower is most likely came afterwards. Church furniture of note, aside from the Romanesque baptismal font, is a pulpit dating from 1572-88 bearing the arms of King Frederik II and his Queen, a bell from 1656, an altarpiece from 1859, a sepulchral tablet from 1663 potentially crafted by the Aarhus carver Rasmus Christensen. There was once a clear view over the fields and meadows into Nørreris Forest in the 1960s, but the view is now limited by modern-day houses.

==== History ====
After the Reformation, the patronage rights of the church belonged to King Frederik III until the 25.th of September 1661, when it was transferred to Morgens Friis Favrskov. In 1672, when Frijsenborg county was established, the church was incorporated into it. The church tithe, the maintenance obligation of the church, was sold at an auction on 5 April 1803, to Sejer Sommer at Haraldslund and to Erik Christian Muller at Møllerup. Sommer and Muller sold the tithe together with the individual farms to the parish’s citizens. On January 1.st 1910, the church became privately owned.

== Archaeology ==
=== The site ===
In the summer of 2008, there were excavations at Søften. The study, led by Moesgård Museum, was spread over an area of six fields just east of Søften. During the summer of 2013, there was a continuation of the study from five years prior. At the site, the sub soil varies greatly, from bold clay over sandy clay and clay-like sand to gravel and rocky sand.

=== Excavations in 2008 ===
In April and May 2008, archaeologists excavated two smaller fields and a small piece of land between commercial buildings in Søften. Initial expectations were to find little evidence of settlements from Pre-Roman Iron Age, Bronze or Neolithic Ages. Farm plants were previously excavated south and southeast of the site from Pre-Roman Iron Age and two mounds of graves from the Early Roman Iron Age. Test trenches on the easternmost part of the site found evidence of postholes that were interpreted as pit-houses. Plant material collected was then dated to the Late Germanic Iron Age or Viking Age and subsequently many of the ditches were covered without further study until a proper archaeological excavation could take place.

=== Features and finds ===
During this field season, fourteen pit houses, a three-aisled long house, a well and a fencing- all from the Late Iron Age and Viking Age, were excavated. Textile tools, iron objects, traces of iron refining, some imported pottery and evidence of glass processing were found. All of the dated items found are from the Viking Age. It was also possible for the archaeologists to identify certain aspects of pit houses construction and in some cases their function. Soil samples were taken and utilized in pollen analysis in order to identify plant potentially incorporated in textile dyeing.

=== Current excavation ===
At the current excavation expectations were to examine a traditional settlement from the Early Roman Iron Age through the investigation of settlement pits, cultural layers and refuse, and posthole analysis of houses. The cultural layers preserved floor layers and details of house construction as well as a stonepath. As the season progressed Viking Age pit houses were exposed and excavated. This survey will supplement the analysis and methods of the 2008 excavations.

=== Features and finds ===
The site is located on a predominantly gravel piece of land, facing south towards the wetland Damsbro Mose. There is a pattern of similar pit-houses along the river system on the other side of the wetland. This apparent strategic location may reveal a ranking between the sites through the individual pit-house features. Metal detecting in and around the pit-houses at Søften found various including a dirham and iron objects such as a knife, a chisel, a pair of rivets. Adjacent to the wetland is a massive fringe of ildskørnede flints, burned material and fist-sized stones. Stavnsager, a site in Jutland, has massive numbers of ildskørnede flints associated with the process of steam bending ship timber. Another use of these flints may have been to heat water for the fulling of large textile pieces.

=== Interpretation ===
==== Pollen analysis ====
The pit house soil samples from the 2008 excavation were used in pollen analysis and showed that the pollen present was not indicative of wind-dispersed pollen (from trees for instance) and did not reflect the species of the surrounding environment. These results are expected of enclosures like pit-houses, or places effected by human activity. The identification of plant species indicated plants previously used for food, medicinal purposes, dyeing or tanning (5).This research lends towards the theory that the pit-houses may have been used for storage, dyeing and tanning and/or production in general.

==== Preserved floor layer ====
The preservation of the floor layer beneath the cultural layer provides interesting details of house construction. It is particularly unusual for East Jutland, however in other parts of the country there are several examples ofwell-preserved house sites with pavements. In particular, the houses in the settlement mounds from Gautenag and the rest of Limfjord area.

==== Geography ====
The geography of the site contextualizes the interpretation of the site. The pattern of pit-houses along the river Lilleå coupled with the interpreted textile and glass processing production of the pit-houses points towards the site’s potential involvement in trade.

== Notable residents ==
- Ole Bendixen (1869 in Søften Sogn - 1958) Danish explorer, merchant and author who served as Royal Inspector of South Greenland from 1903 to 1914
- Carpark North a Danish electronic rock band formed in 1999, includes Morten Thorhauge, the drummer from Søften
