= Favrskov Municipality =

Favrskov Municipality Favrskov Kommune (Danish)
- Municipality
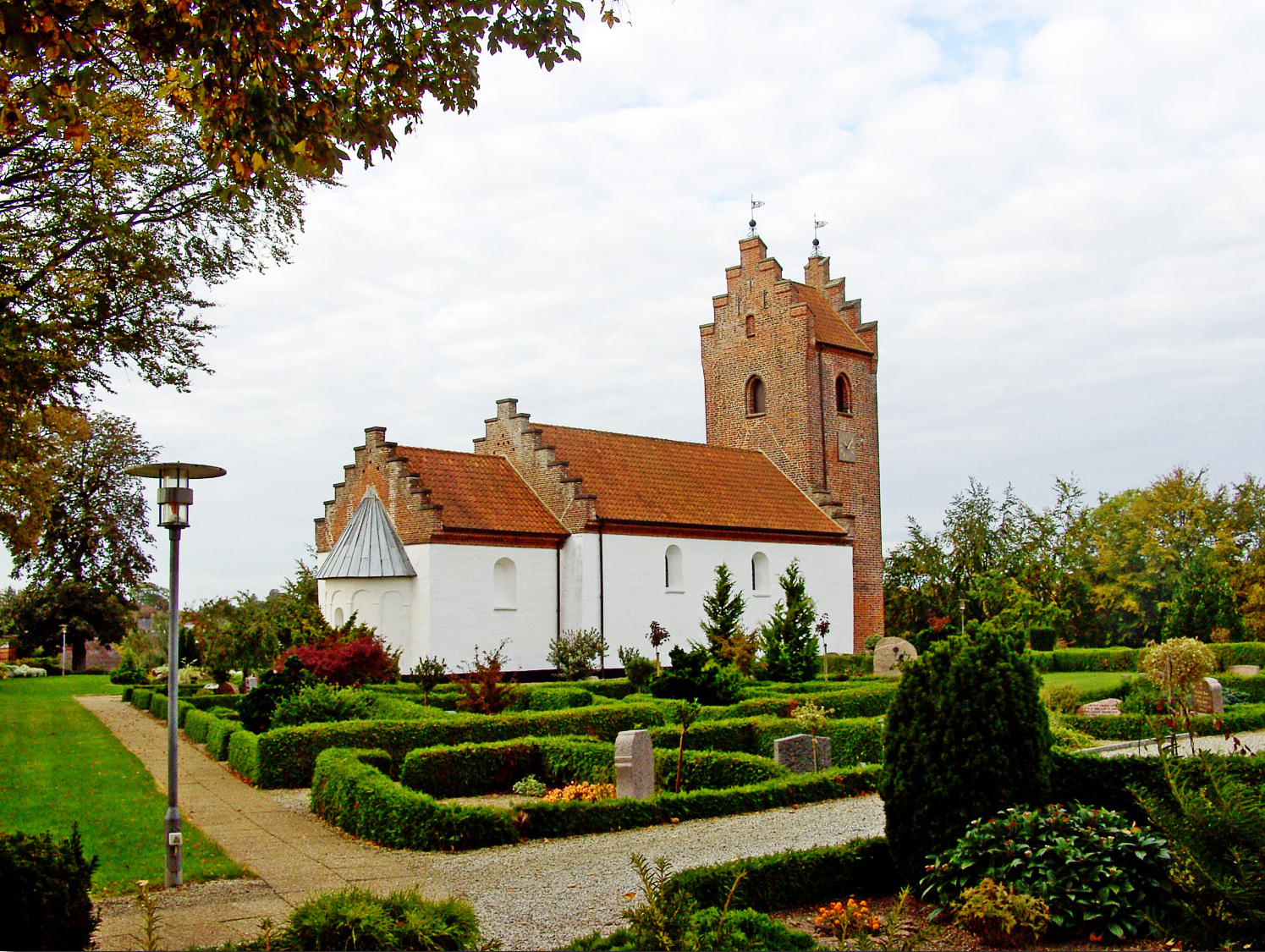
- Thorsø Church in Favrskov

- Coat of arms

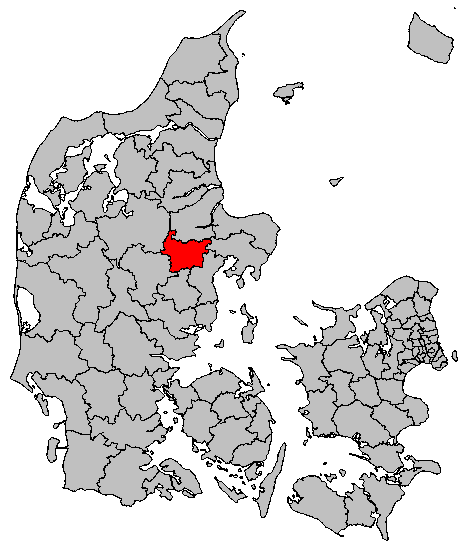
- Favrskov Municipality
- Coordinates: 56°19′43″N 10°02′46″E
- Country: Denmark
- Region: Central Denmark
- Established: 2007
- Seat: Hinnerup

Government
  - Mayor: Lars Storgaard (C)

Area
  - Total: 540.25 km^{2} (208.59 sq mi)

Population (1 January 2026)
  - Total: 49,773
  - Density: 92.130/km^{2} (238.61/sq mi)
- Time zone: UTC+1 (CET)
  - Summer (DST): UTC+2 (CEST)
- Postal code: 8382
- Website: www.favrskov.dk

Favrskov Municipality (Danish: Favrskov Kommune, pronounced [ˈfɑwˀɐˌskʌwˀ kʰoˈmuːnə]) is a municipality in Central Denmark Region in Denmark north of Aarhus and is a part of the Aarhus area. According to municipal and regional key figures the municipality covers an area of 540.25 km^{2} (208.59 square miles) and had a population of 49,773 as of 1 January 2026.

The largest towns within the municipality are Hadsten, Hinnerup and Hammel.

Favrskov Municipality was created on 1 January 2007 as a result of Kommunalreformen ("The Municipal Reform" of 2007). It is a fusion of the former municipalities of Hadsten, Hammel, Hinnerup and Hvorslev, as well as the southern part of the former Langå Municipality. The northern parts of Favrskov Municipality, consisting roughly of the former municipalities of Hadsten, Langå and Hvorslev, are part of the larger geographical region of Kronjylland (Crown Jutland).

The municipality is part of Business Region Aarhus and of the East Jutland metropolitan area, which had a total population of 1.378 million in 2016.

According to Danmarks Statistik, from 2005 to 2009, this was the third-fastest growing municipality out of 98.

== Location ==
Hadsten	8,300
Hinnerup	7,800
Hammel	7,000
Søften	2,900
Ulstrup	2,000
Thorsø	1,800
Folby	1,100
Laurbjerg	970

== Politics ==
=== Municipal council ===
Favrskov's municipal council consists of 25 members, elected every four years.

Below are the municipal councils elected since the Municipal Reform of 2007.

Election	Party										Total seats	Turnout	Elected mayor
Election	A	B	C	D	F	I	O	V	Æ	Ø	Total seats	Turnout	Elected mayor
2005	9	1	3		2		1	11			27	74.3%	Anders G. Christensen (V)
2009	11		2		3		1	10			27	70.5%	Nils Borring (A)
2013	11		1		1		2	9		1	25	78.0%	Nils Borring (A)
2017	11		2		1		1	9		1	25	76.0%	Nils Borring (A)
2021	9	1	6	1	1		1	5		1	25	73.1%	Lars Storgaard (C)
2025	5	1	8		2	1	1	4	2	1	25	75.7%	Lars Storgaard (C)
Data from Kmdvalg.dk 2005, 2009, 2013, 2017, and 2021. Data from valg.dk 2025

== Notable people ==
- Anne Sophie Reventlow (1693 in Clausholm Castle – 1743) Queen of Denmark and Norway from 1721 to 1730 as the second wife of Frederick IV of Denmark and Norway.
- Niels Hjersing Clementin (1721-1776), Danish actor, born in Hvorslev

== Sister cities ==
The following cities are twinned with Hadsten and Hinnerup:

- Saarijärvi, Western Finland, Finland

== Sources ==
- Municipal statistics: NetBorger Kommunefakta, delivered from KMD aka Kommunedata (Municipal Data)
- Municipal mergers and neighbors: Eniro new municipalities map
