= Hinnerup =

- Town
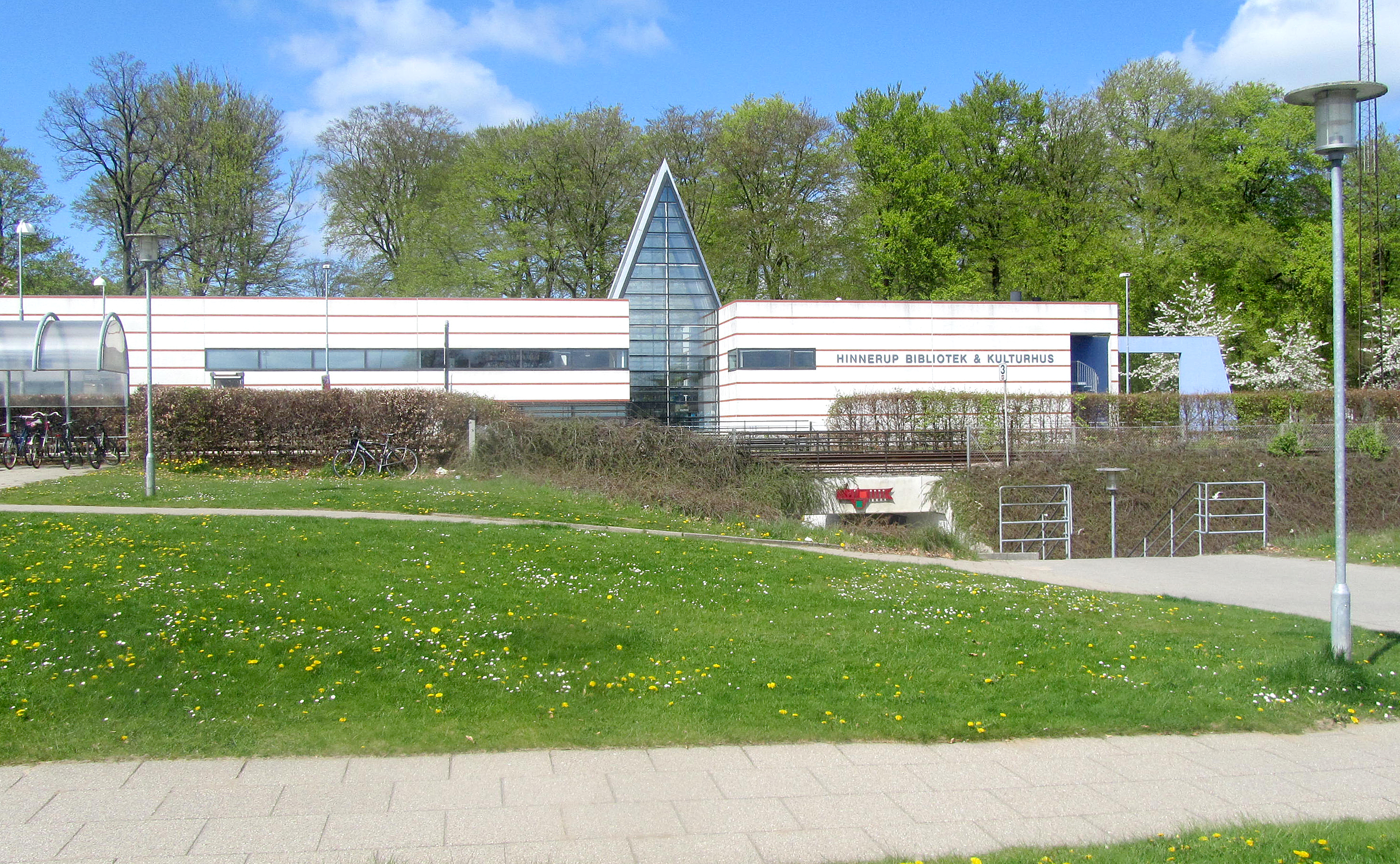
- The library and cultural house in Hinnerup

- Location in Denmark Hinnerup (Central Denmark Region)
- Coordinates: 56°15′52″N 10°03′48″E
- Country: Denmark
- Region: Region Midtjylland
- Municipality: Favrskov Municipality

Area
  - Urban: 4.5 km^{2} (1.7 sq mi)

Population (2026)
  - Urban: 8,628
  - Urban density: 1,900/km^{2} (5,000/sq mi)
  - Gender: 4,123 males and 4,505 females
- Time zone: UTC+1 (CET)
  - Summer (DST): UTC+2 (CEST)
- Postal code: DK-8382 Hinnerup

Hinnerup is a small town in eastern Jutland, Denmark, in Favrskov Municipality, Region Midtjylland, northwest of Aarhus. It has become mostly a suburb, and is connected to Aarhus by Søften, Lisbjerg and Skejby. The town has a population of 8,628 (1 January 2026).

Until 1 January 2007, Hinnerup was the site of the municipal council of the now former Hinnerup Municipality. It is now the municipal seat of Favrskov Municipality.

== History ==
The railway town of "Hinnerup Stationsby" emerged in 1862. The town later gave its name to the former Hinnerup Municipality, which was formed in 1967 by fusing the parishes of Grundfør, Vitten, Haldum and Vitten with Søften-Foldby Municipality.

A central building is "Hinnerup Bibliotek og Kulturhus" (Library and Cultural House), which opened in May 1993. The modern building has been designed by Hans Peter Svendler Nielsen from architectural firm 3XN, in Aarhus. In April 2002, an arson ruined most of the library facilities; however, it was re-opened in November the same year. The building also houses small art exhibitions and serves as a tiny ticket sales office for the railway line going right by.

In 2012, the city celebrated its 150th anniversary with a visit by Frederik, the Crown Prince of Denmark and his wife, Mary, Crown Princess of Denmark.

== Notable people ==
- Dame Adeline Genée DBE (1878 in Hinnerup – 1970) a Danish/British ballet dancer
- Lars Hjortshøj (born 1967 in Hinnerup) a Danish stand-up comedian and TV and radio host

== Sister cities ==
The following cities were twinned with Hinnerup:

- Saarijärvi, Western Finland, Finland
