= Purhus Municipality =

Former municipality in Jutland, Denmark

Coordinates: 56°32′37″N 9°51′01″E

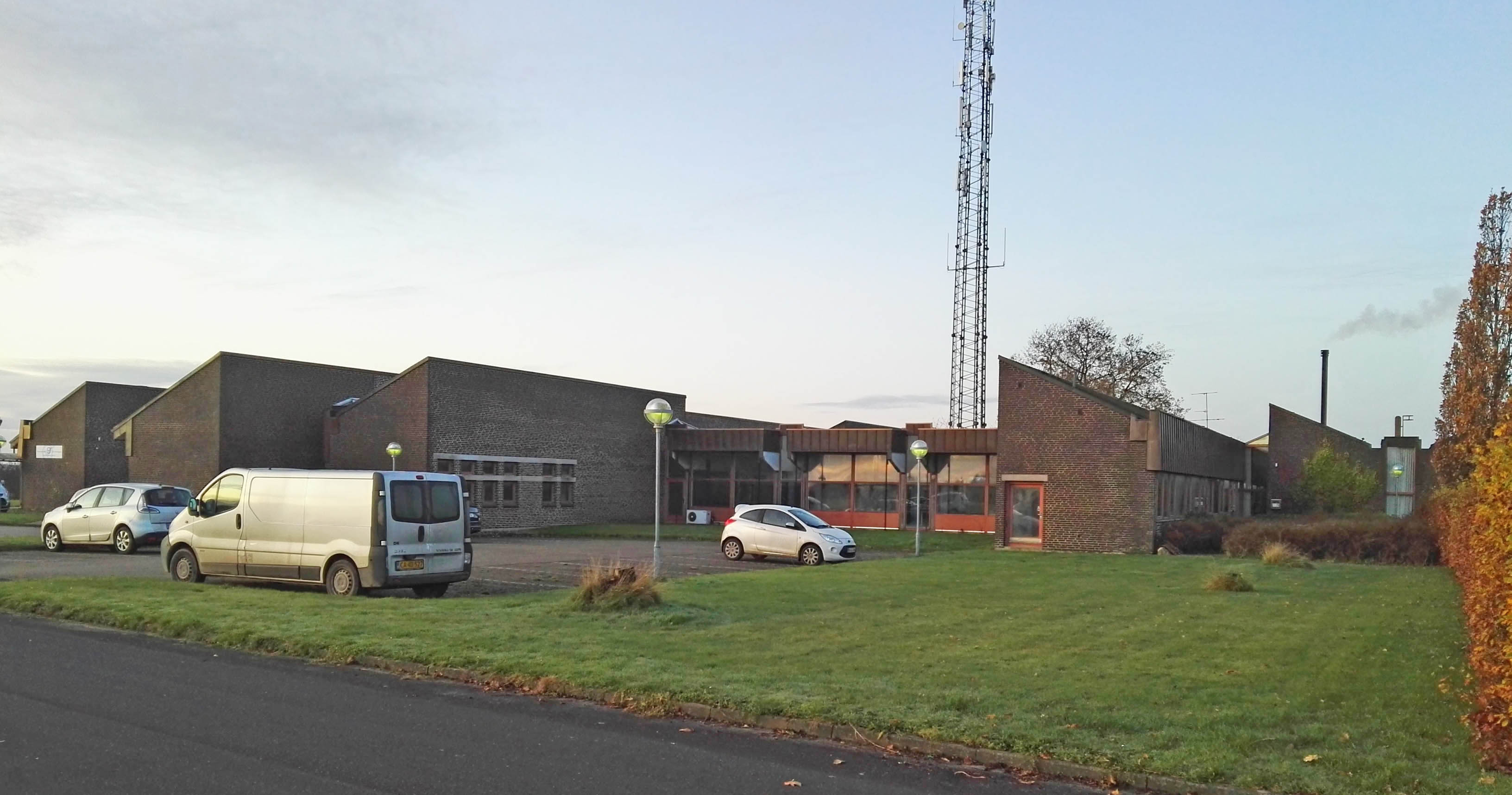

Until 1 January 2007 Purhus municipality was a municipality (Danish, kommune) in the former Aarhus County on the Jutland peninsula in central Denmark. The municipality covered an area of 169 km^{2}, and had a total population of 8,547 (2005). Its last mayor was Berner Nielsen, a member of the Social Democrats (Socialdemokraterne) political party. The main town and the site of its municipal council is the town of Fårup.

Purhus municipality ceased to exist as the result of Kommunalreformen ("The Municipality Reform" of 2007). It was merged with existing Nørhald, Randers, and a portion of each of the following municipalities— Langå, Mariager, and Sønderhald— to form an enlarged Randers municipality. This created a municipality with an area of 793 km^{2} and a total population of 96,409 (2005). The municipality belongs to Region Midtjylland ("Mid-Jutland Region").
