= Langå Municipality =

Former municipality in Denmark

Coordinates: 56°23′27″N 9°53′41″E

Until 1 January 2007 Langå municipality was a municipality (Danish, kommune) in Aarhus County on the Jutland peninsula in central Denmark. The municipality covered an area of 133 km^{2}, and had a total population of 8,396 in 2005. Its last mayor was Hanne Nielsen, a member of the Social Democrats (Socialdemokraterne) political party. The main town and site of its municipal council was the town of Langå.

Langå municipality ceased to exist due to Kommunalreformen ("The Municipality Reform" of 2007). The southern part of Langå municipality was merged with Hadsten, Hammel, Hinnerup and Hvorslev municipalities to form the new Favrskov municipality. This created a municipality with an area of 487 km^{2} and a total population of ca. 41,596 (2005). The new municipality belongs to Region Midtjylland ("Mid-Jutland Region"). The remainder of Langå municipality was incorporated into an enlarged Randers municipality.
