= Thorsø, Denmark =

Thorsø
- Village
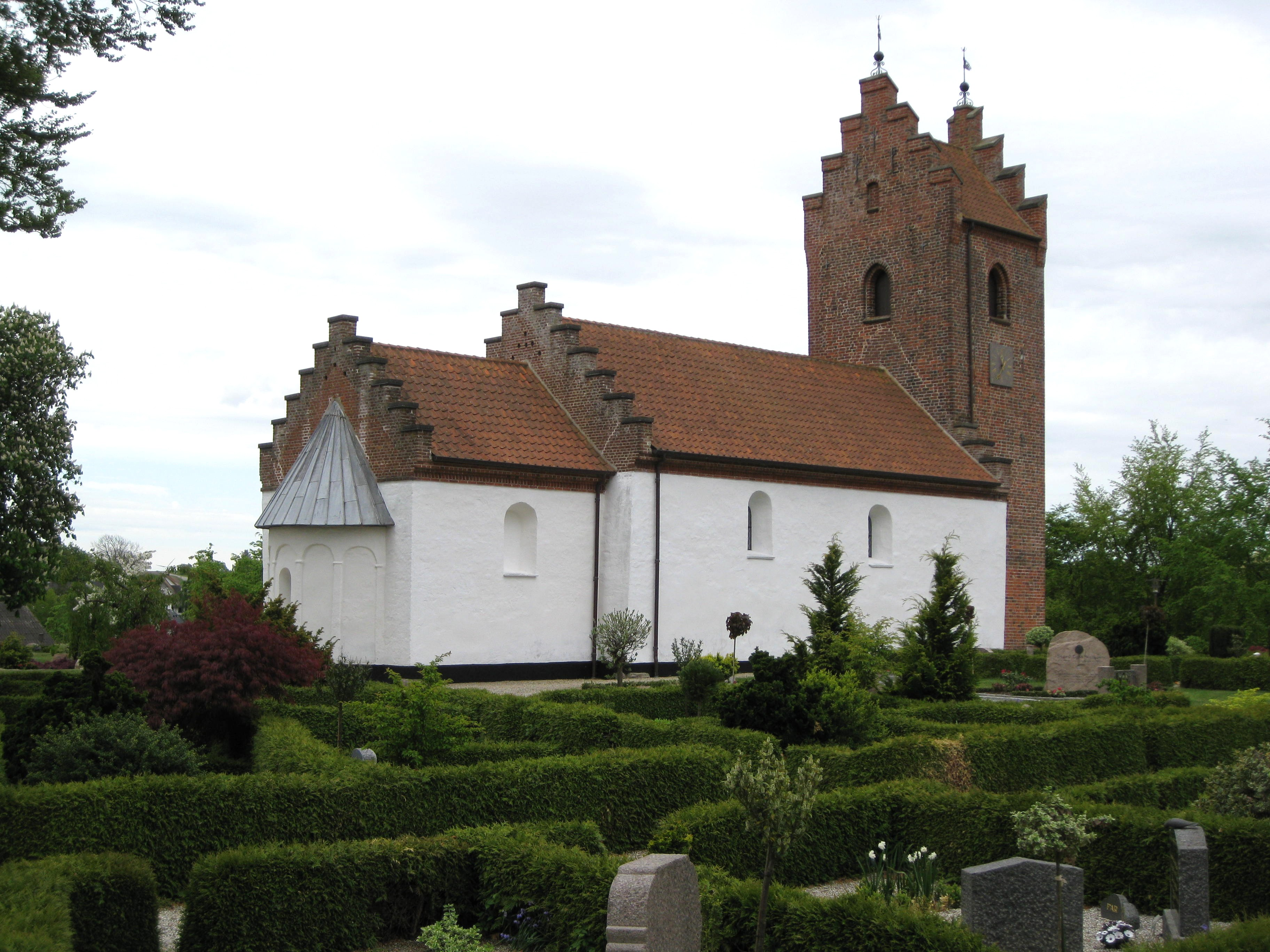
- Thorsø Church

- Location in Denmark
- Coordinates: 56.300978°N 9.789033°E
- Country: Denmark
- Region: Central Denmark (Midtjylland)
- Municipality: Randers

Area
  - Urban: 1.44 km^{2} (0.56 sq mi)

Population (2026)
  - Urban: 1,753
  - Urban density: 1,220/km^{2} (3,150/sq mi)
- Time zone: UTC+1 (CET)
  - Summer (DST): UTC+2 (CEST)
- Postal code: 8881

Thorsø is a village, with a population of 1,753 (1 January 2026), located in Favrskov Municipality of the Central Denmark Region in the Jutland peninsula of Denmark.
