= Hammel =

- Town
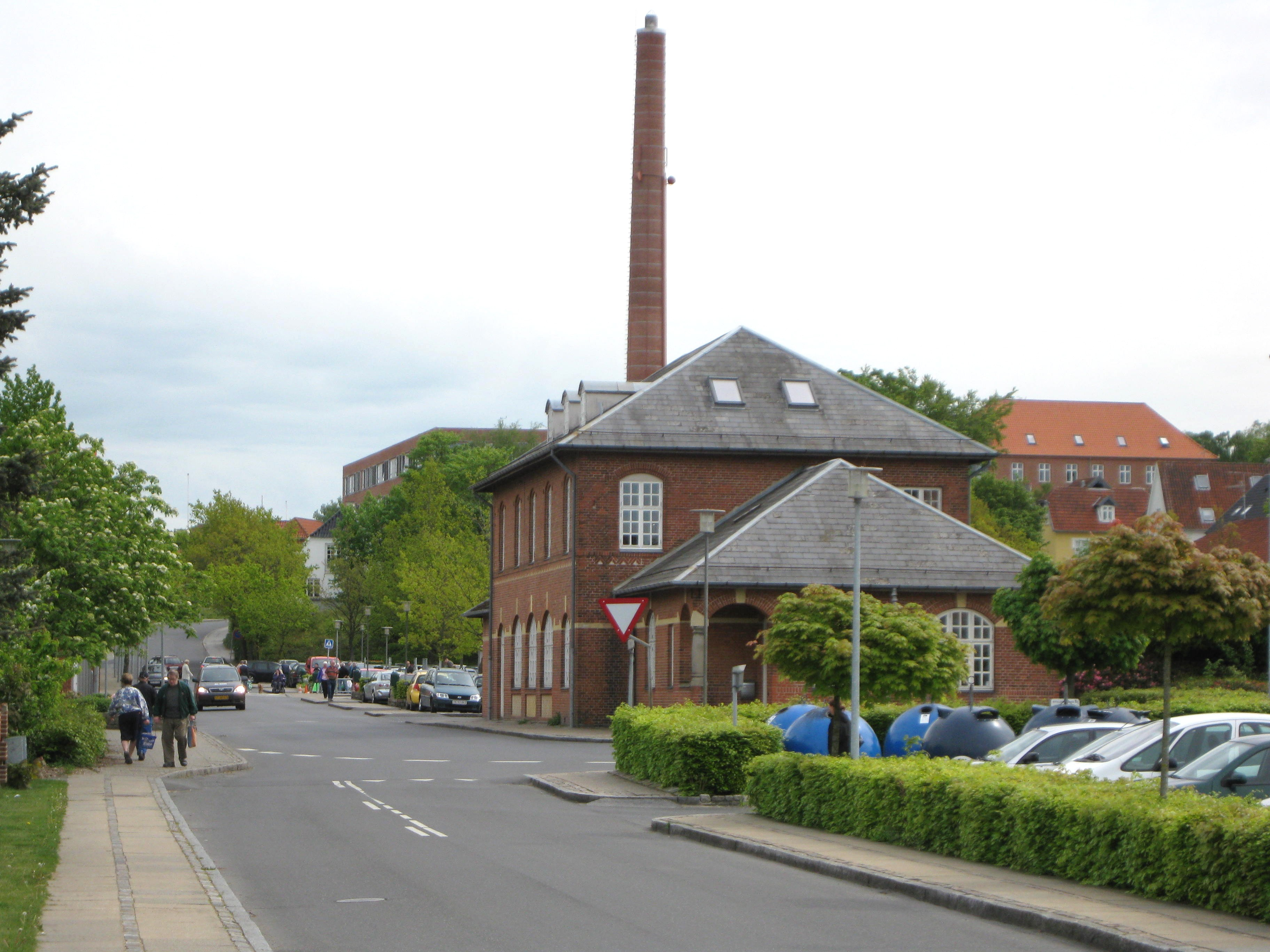
- The building of the former railway station

- Location in Denmark Hammel (Central Denmark Region)
- Coordinates: 56°15′24″N 9°51′42″E
- Country: Denmark
- Region: Region Midtjylland
- Municipality: Favrskov Municipality

Area
  - Urban: 5.4 km^{2} (2.1 sq mi)

Population (2026)
  - Urban: 7,373
  - Urban density: 1,400/km^{2} (3,500/sq mi)
  - Gender: 3,632 males and 3,741 females
- Time zone: UTC+1 (CET)
  - Summer (DST): UTC+2 (CEST)
- Postal code: DK-8450 Hammel

Hammel is a town in central Denmark with a population of 7,373 (1 January 2026), and a former railway town at the Aarhus-Hammel-Thorsø railroad which was closed in 1956. The town is located in Favrskov municipality in Jutland. Until 1 January 2007 it was also the site of the municipal council of the now former Hammel Municipality.

== History ==
Hammel first saw significant settlement in the 13th century. The town was recorded as "Hamel" in 1479 and "Hammell" in 1596. The etymology of the town's name is believed to derive from the old Danish term "hamal", meaning "hill".

Hammel was not significantly larger than the other settlements in the area until the 1860s. In the first half of the 19th century, the village had about 11 farms and 40 houses which belonged to the count of Frijsenborg. Its expansion was the result of several initiatives taken by the count, who sought to transform the village into a market-town. Through his influence, the local court building for the judicial district of Frijsenborg-Favrskov was established in the town in 1837. By 1900, a prison, pharmacy, hotel, post office, technical school, primary school, hospital school and industrial factories had opened in the town.

By 1902, the town had a population of over 1,200. That year, Hammel station was designed by architect Heinrich Wenck and opened as the terminus of the Hammel-Aarhus Railway. The rail line was extended in 1914 to Thorsø, though the number of passengers traveling from Thorsø to Hammel was never profitable. Nevertheless, the railway connection in Hammel turned it into a railway town, and its population expanded. By 1916 Hammel had a population of 1,513, and by 1955 had 2,282. The entire railway line closed in 1956 and parts have since been preserved as a walking path. Wenck's original station building still stands at Torvegade 9.

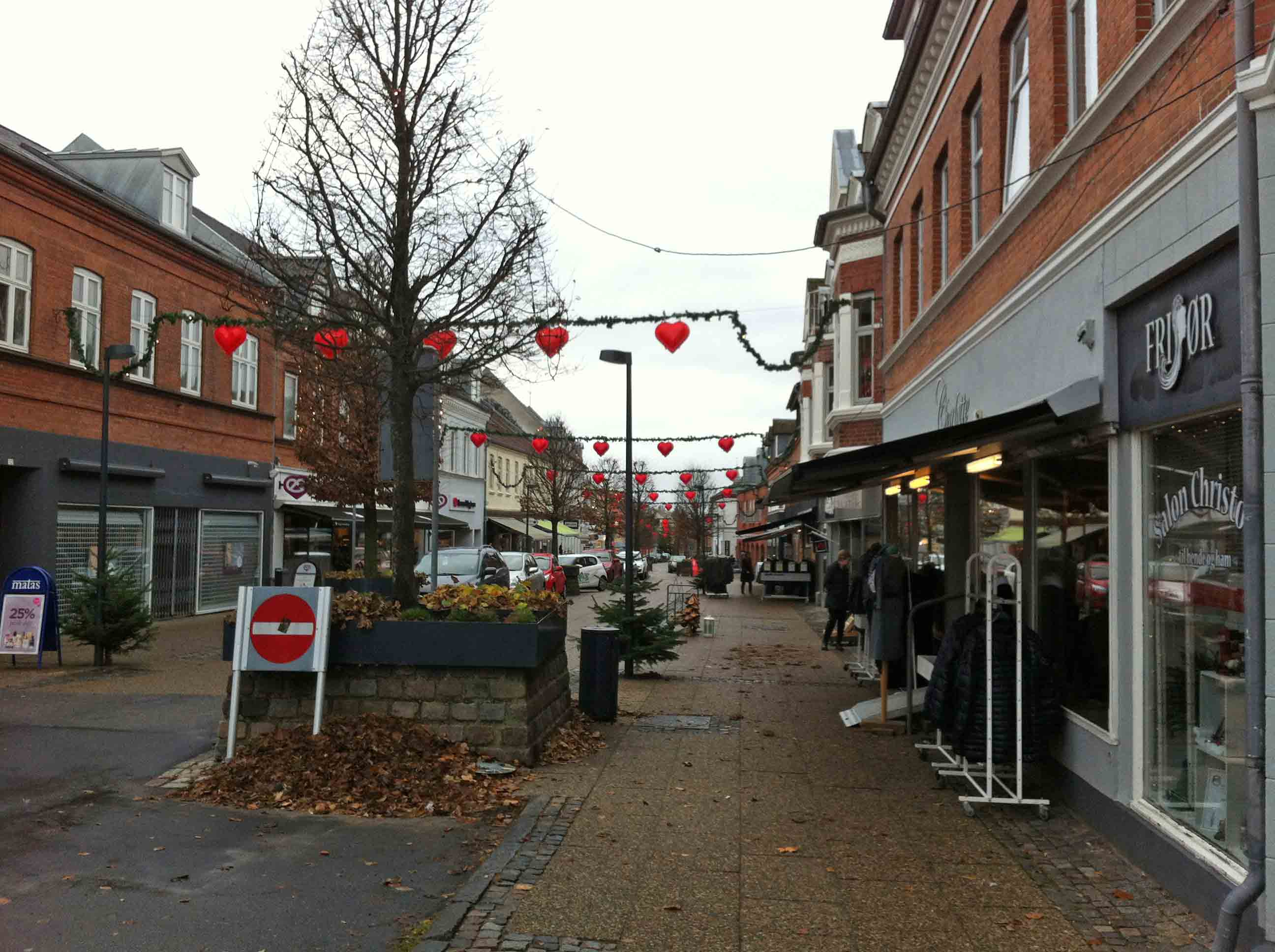
Østergade, 2016.

For much of its history, Hammel was a parish within the jurisdiction of Gjern Herred. Following the 1970 Danish Municipal Reform the town beceame the seat of Hammel Municipality. The municipality was dissolved in the municipal reform of 2007, and today Hammel lies with Favrskov Municipality.

== Religion ==
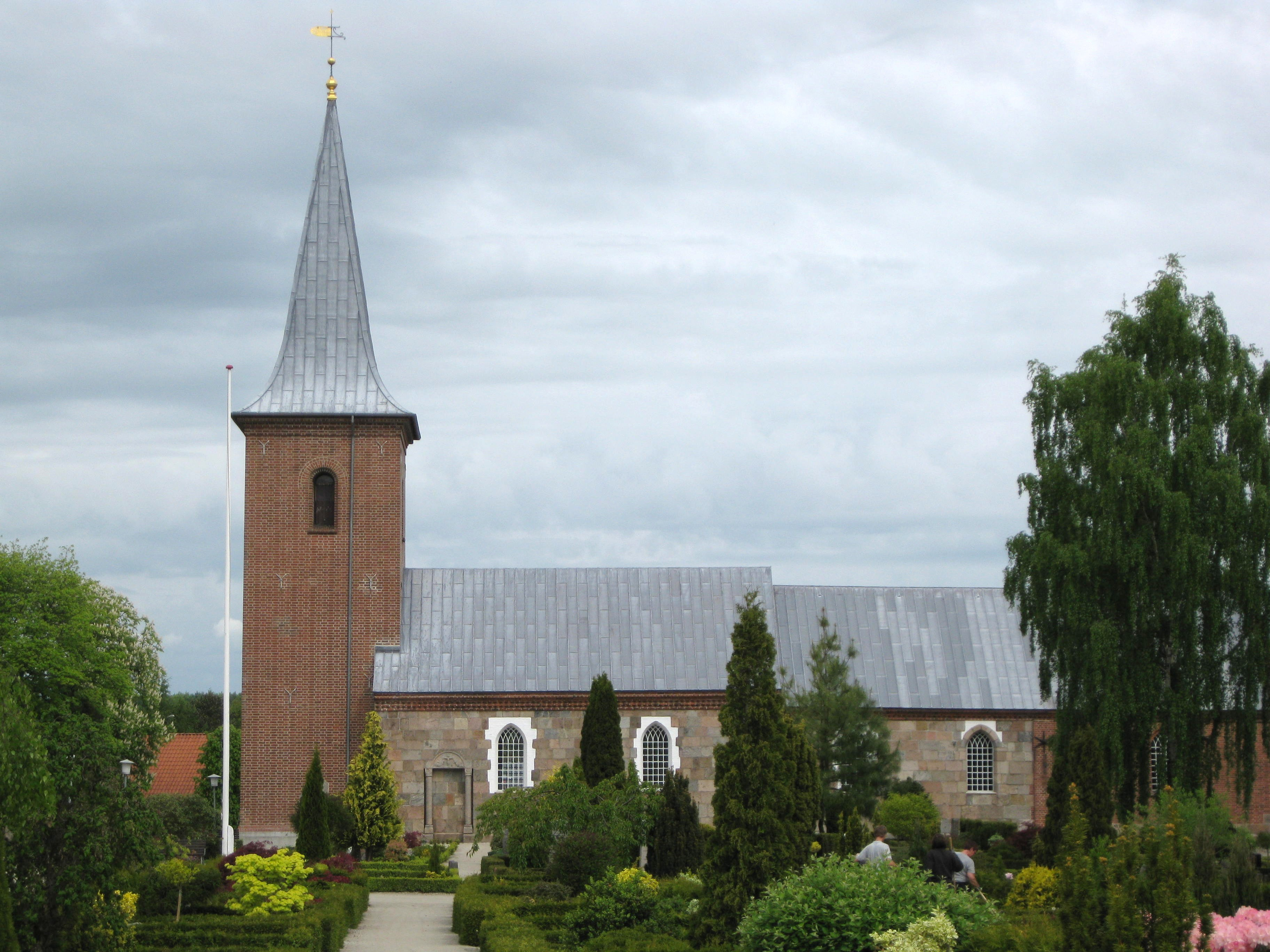
Hammel Church, 2009.

Hammel Church was originally constructed in the romanesque style c. 1100. Its nave and part of the choir date to the 12th century, while the tower was added in the 17th and altered in the 19th century. In 1558, the king ordered that the nearby Jernit Church be demolished and its possessions be transferred to Hammel, thus expanding the size of Hammel's parish. Today, the church is considered a road church.

== Notable people ==
- Dr. Timen Stiddem (born 1610 in Hammel), a prominent citizen and doctor in Wilmington, Delaware, arrived in New Sweden in 1654 and is recorded as the first physician in Delaware
- Johan Bartholdy (1853 in Hammel–1904), an organist, composer, singing teacher, conductor and author
- Chris Anker Sørensen (born 1984 in Hammel–2021), a Danish professional road bicycle racer
- Gitte Sunesen (born 1971 in Hammel), a former handball player and gold medallist at the 1996 Summer Olympics
