= Randers Municipality =

Randers Municipality Randers Kommune (Danish)
- Municipality
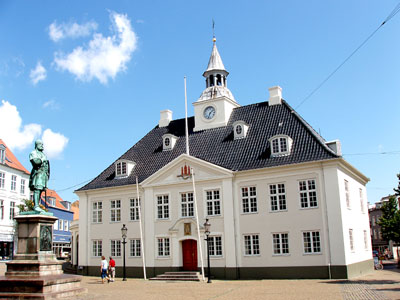
- The old Town Hall on the square in Randers with statue of Niels Ebbesen in front

- Coat of arms

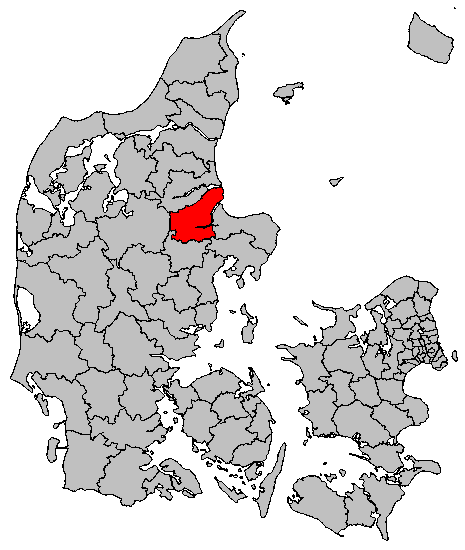
- Coordinates: 56°27′35″N 10°02′10″E
- Country: Denmark
- Region: Central Denmark
- Seat: Randers

Government
  - Mayor: Torben Hansen

Area
  - Total: 748.21 km^{2} (288.89 sq mi)

Population (1 January 2026)
  - Total: 100,564
  - Density: 134.41/km^{2} (348.11/sq mi)
- Time zone: UTC1 (CET)
  - Summer (DST): UTC2 (CEST)
- Website: www.randers.dk

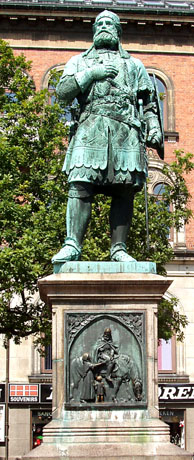
Niels Ebbesen statue in front of the old Town Hall in Randers, Denmark.

Randers Municipality (Danish: Randers Kommune, pronounced [ˈʁɑnɐs kʰoˈmuːnə]) is a municipality (Danish, kommune) in Region Midtjylland on the Jutland peninsula in central Denmark. The municipality covers an area of 748.21 km^{2} (288.89 sq mi), and has a population of 100,564 (as of 1 January 2026). Its mayor, since 1 January 2018 is Torben Hansen, a member of the Social Democrats. The main town and the site of its municipal council is the city of Randers.

The municipality is part of Business Region Aarhus and of the East Jutland metropolitan area, which had a total population of 1.378 million in 2016.

== Overview ==
The Guden River (Gudenå), Denmark's longest river, runs from Randers Fjord in Nørhald municipality to the east, through the city of Randers, and splits in two about 5 km west of the central city. The northern tributary is called Nørreå ("Northern River"), and it continues westward, defining part of the boundary between Århus and Viborg Counties, and terminates at Vedsø ("Lake Ved") near the town of Rindsholm in Viborg municipality. The 160-kilometre long Guden River continues to Tinnet Krat in Vejle County.

The city's nearly 3-kilometre long Guden River Park (Gudenåparken) stretches along the river's banks in the centre of the town.

== History ==
On 1 January 2007, Randers municipality was, as the result of Kommunalreformen ("The Municipal Reform" of 2007), merged with the existing Nørhald and Purhus, together with a portion of each of the following municipalities— Langå, Sønderhald, and Mariager— to form an enlarged Randers municipality.

== Subdivisions ==
The municipality is composed by the city of Randers and 26 villages:

| Nr | Place | Population (2023) |
|---|---|---|
| 1 | Randers | 64,057 |
| 2 | Assentoft | 3,822 |
| 3 | Langå | 2,879 |
| 4 | Stevnstrup | 2,522 |
| 5 | Spentrup | 2,316 |
| 6 | Harridslev | 1,219 |
| 7 | Fårup | 1,050 |
| 8 | Øster Bjerregrav | 1,010 |
| 9 | Øster Tørslev | 879 |
| 10 | Havndal | 812 |
| 11 | Haslund | 799 |
| 12 | Asferg | 667 |
| 13 | Gjerlev | 631 |
| 14 | Mejlby | 618 |
| 15 | Mellerup | 518 |
| 16 | Gassum | 417 |
| 17 | Uggelhuse | 415 |
| 18 | Hald | 364 |
| 19 | Råsted | 298 |
| 20 | Hørning | 296 |
| 21 | Værum | 290 |
| 22 | Ålum | 272 |
| 23 | Albæk | 268 |
| 24 | Dalbyover | 254 |
| 25 | Gimming | 231 |
| 26 | Tånum | 223 |
| 27 | Lem | 203 |

== Politics ==
=== Municipal council ===
Randers' municipal council consists of 31 members, elected every four years.

Below are the municipal councils elected since the Municipal Reform of 2007.

| Election | Party | | | | | | | | | | Total seats | Turnout | Elected mayor |
|---|---|---|---|---|---|---|---|---|---|---|---|---|---|
| Election | A | B | C | F | L | O | R | V | Æ | Ø | Total seats | Turnout | Elected mayor |
| 2005 | 12 | 1 | 1 | | 3 | 1 | 1 | 12 | | | 31 | 68.7% | Henning Jensen Nyhuus (A) |
| 2009 | 13 | 1 | 2 | 2 | 2 | 2 | | 9 | | | 31 | 65.1% | Henning Jensen Nyhuus (A) |
| 2013 | 10 | 1 | 1 | 1 | 3 | 3 | | 11 | 1 | | 31 | 72.7% | Claus O. Jensen (V) |
| 2017 | 13 | 1 | 1 | 1 | 1 | 3 | | 9 | 1 | 1 | 31 | 70.7% | Torben Hansen (A) |
Data from Kmdvalg.dk 2005, 2009, 2013 and 2017

== Notable residents ==
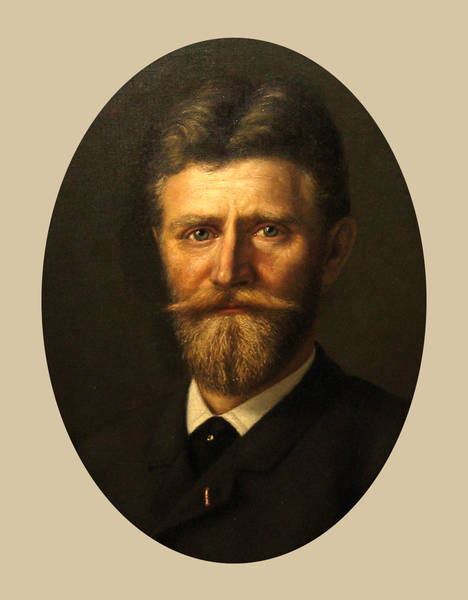
Christopher Peter Jürgensen, 1880s

- Stygge Krumpen (ca.1485 in Skjøtterup – 1551) a Danish clergyman, secretary of king Christian II of Denmark and the last catholic bishop of the Diocese of Børglum from 1533 to 1536
- Pauline Worm (1825 in Hyllested – 1883) a Danish writer, poet, schoolteacher and feminist
- Christopher Peter Jürgensen (1838 in Gesing – 1911) a Danish precision mechanic and instrument maker
- Niels Lergaard (1893 in Vorup - 1982) a painter, member of the Bornholm school of painters
- Sven Dalsgaard (1914 in Vorup – 1999) a Danish painter, sculptor and writer

=== Sport ===
- Lars Elstrup (born 1963 in Råby) a Danish former professional footballer, with 340 club caps and 34 for Denmark
- Erik Bo Andersen (born 1970 in Dronningborg) a Danish former professional footballer with 200 club caps and 6 for Denmark
- Michael Gravgaard (born 1978 in Spentrup) a Danish former footballer with 317 club caps and 18 for Denmark
- Simone Böhme (born 1991 in Spentrup) a Danish female handballer

== Sources ==
- Municipal statistics: NetBorger Kommunefakta, delivered from KMD aka Kommunedata (Municipal Data)
- Municipal mergers and neighbours: Eniro new municipalities map
- Searchable/printable municipal maps: Krak mapsearch (outline visible but doesn't print out!)
