= Drastrup (Essenbæk Parish) =

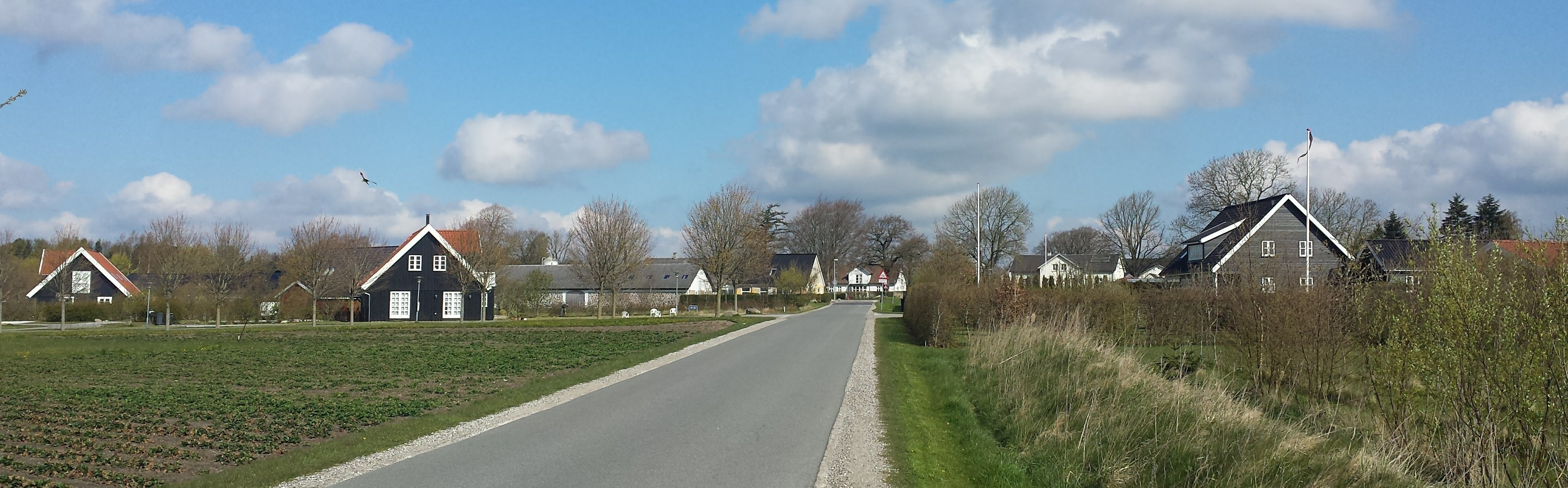

- Drastrup Denmark
- Coordinates: 56.444444°N 10.170111°E
- Country: Denmark
- Region: Central Denmark (Midtjylland)
- Municipality: Randers

Population (2010)
  - Total: 28
- Time zone: UTC+1 (Central Europe Time)
  - Summer (DST): UTC+2
- Postal code: 8960
- Area code: (+45) 8

Drastrup is a village on the peninsula of Jutland, with a population of 28 (2010). It is a part of Randers Municipality in the Central Denmark Region. The village is gradually becoming enveloped by the growth of Assentoft.

== History ==
=== Prehistory ===
In the present Drastrup remains have been found of a round barrow from antiquity.

=== Early history ===
In medieval place names the last particle -trup means ”secondary settlement”. Drastrup is known from September 16, 1465, when its peasants were tenant farmers of Essenbæk Abbey.

=== Modern history ===
After the Reformation, the king confiscated Essenbæk Abbey and its estate in 1540, and when Drastrup was acquired on August 22, 1661, from the king by Hans Friis, there were six farms in the village. Its location on moraine hills shows that agriculture was prioritized there, but cattle were probably kept on the meadows below the village.

On March 18, 1695, Hans Friis gave Essenbæk Home Farm (Essenbæk Ladegård), including adjoining estates, to his nephew Christian Friis, who on February 15, 1726, incorporated them into the entailed estate of Tustrup. On October 30, 1782, the king gave permission for the sale of the estate, and Essenbæk Home Farm was sold at auction at Tustrup on December 18, 1783, to Christian Kallager; the deed was signed on June 11, 1785.

However, as early as June 10, 1787, he sold it to Peter Severin Fønss and Johan Frederik Carøe. In that year there were in Drastrup six farms, a smallholding and two houses, in which resided 87 people. Before the end of the following year the village was sold to the tenant farmers there, who subdivided it among themselves.

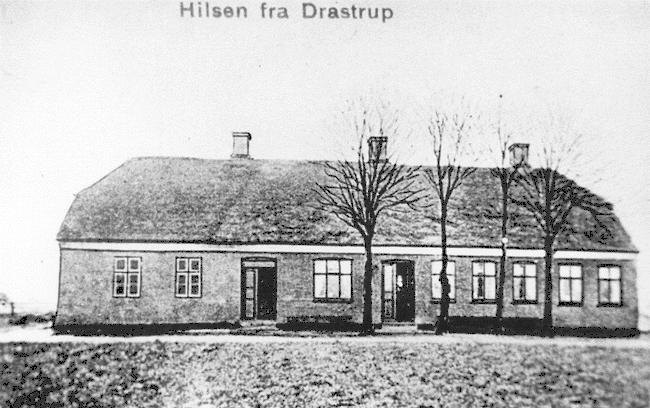
Drastrup School in ca. 1880.

A newly built school was opened in Drastrup March 1, 1859, and Drastrup Co-operative Society (Drastrup Brugsforening) was established in 1900.

In the village the Virring-Essenbæk Municipality and the Årslev-Hørning Municipality opened September 1, 1959, the Sønderhald hundred Central School (Sønderhald herreds Forbundsskole), also called the Sønderhald School (Sønderhaldskolen), and February 1, 1960, the previous school there was closed as such. Drastrup Co-operative Society was abolished in 1965, but in 1968 a sports ground and a clubhouse were constructed at the Sønderhald School.

From February 28, 1973, the Sønderhald Municipality decided to expand the residential area of Assentoft East (Assentoft Øst) with inter alia parts of Drastrup, including the Sønderhald School, so that the village is becoming surrounded by Assentoft. However, the village environment, with several farm structures, is relatively well-preserved.

Assentofts surrounding of Drastrup

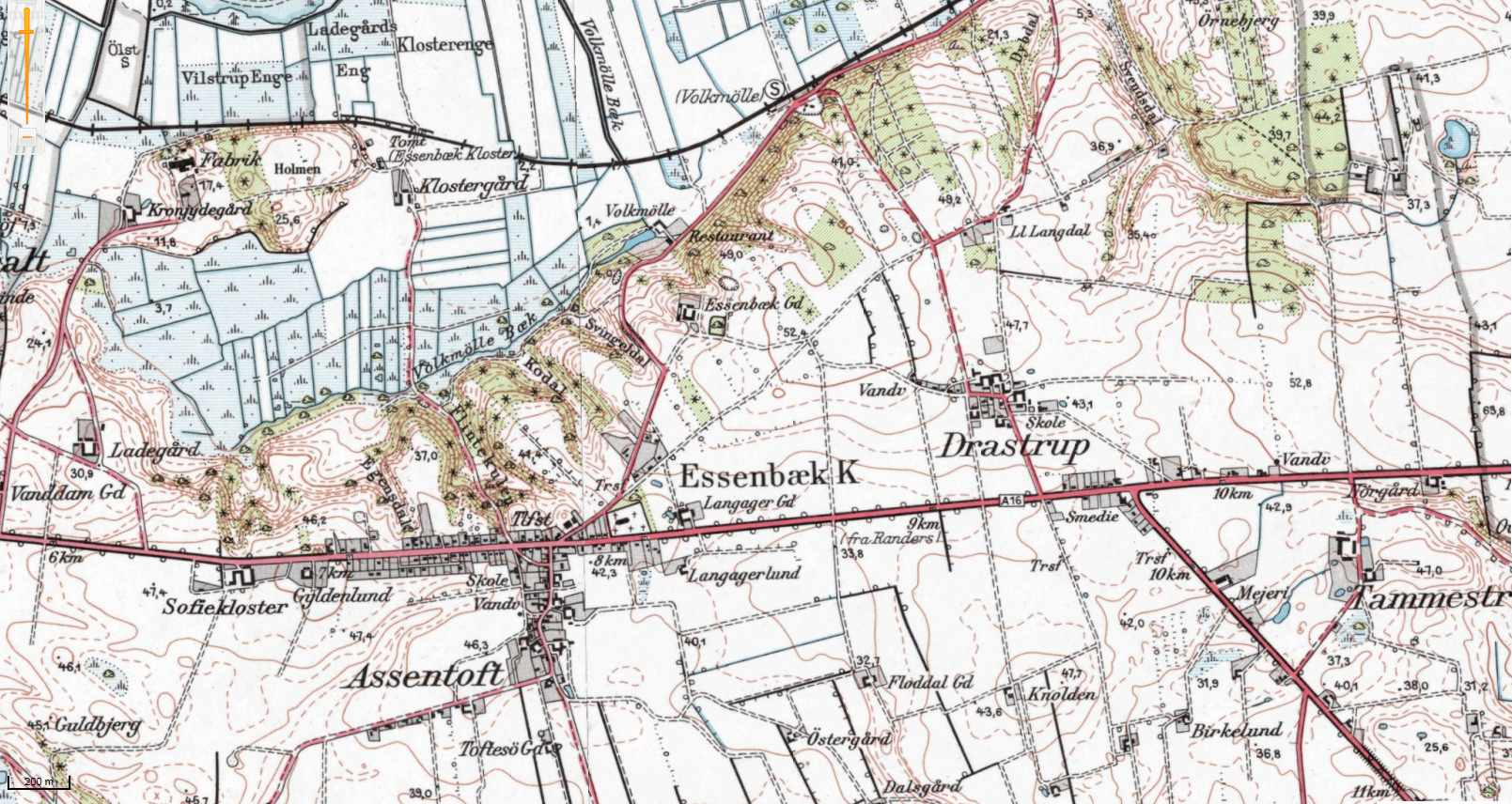
Map from 1976

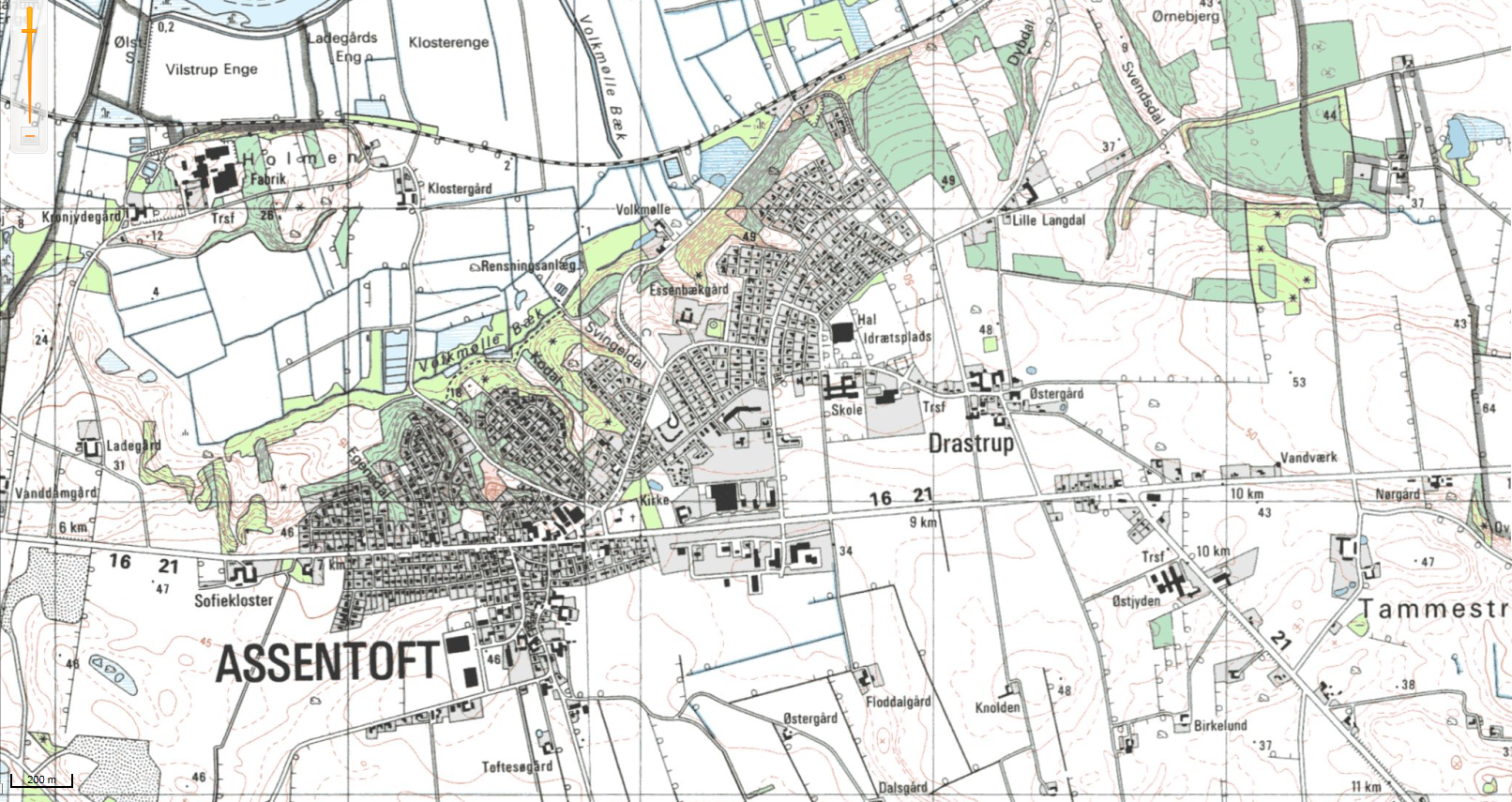
Map from 2001

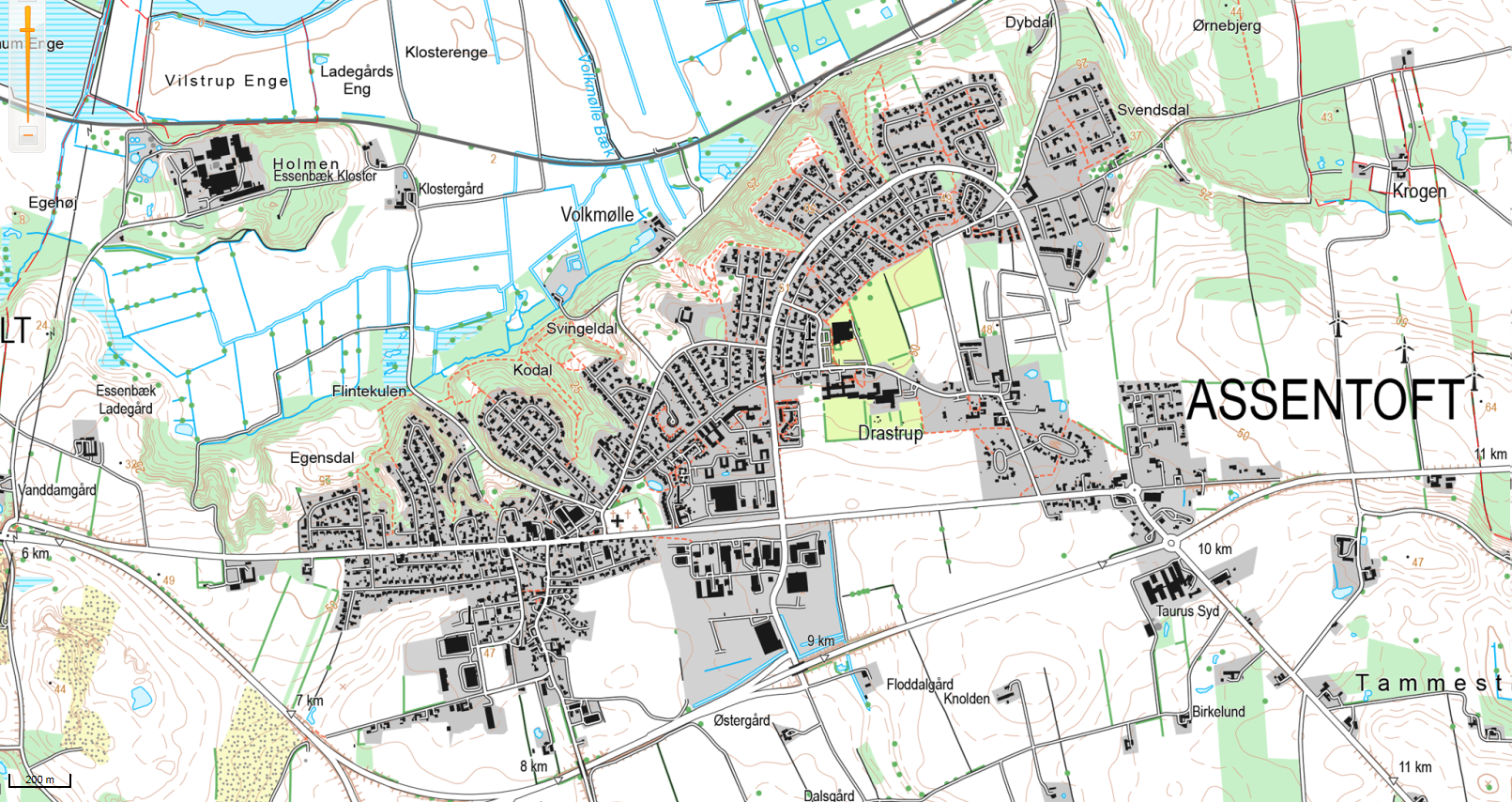
Map from 2016

== Geography ==
The landscape in and around Drastrup is relatively flat, with few hills.
