= List of chronicles about Denmark =

This is a list of chronicles, annals and historical works about Denmark from antiquity to medieval times. These books / writings (and others), which were mostly written in Latin, form the bases of knowledge for the early history of Denmark.

== Chronicles and historical works ==
- Brevis Historia Regum Dacie (Sven Aggesen Danmarkshistorie)
- Chronica Jutensis (Jydske Krønike)
- Chronicon Lethrense (Lejrekrøniken)
- Chronicon Roskildense (Roskildekrøniken)
- Chronica Sialandie 1028-1307 (Yngre Sjællandske Krønike)
- Chronica Sialandie 1308-1366 (Ældre Sjællandske Krønike)
- Compendium Saxonis (Saxo kompendia i Jyske Krønike)
- Gesta Danorum (Saxos Danmarkshistorie)
- Gesta Danorum på danskæ
- Skibby Chronicle (Skibby-krøniken)

== Annales ==
- Annales ad annum 1290 perducti (Annalistiske Noter, der ender 1290)
- Annales Albiani
- Annales Colbazenses (Colbaz arbogen)
- Annales Dano-Suecani 916-1263 (Dansk-Svensk årbog 916-1263)
- Annales Essenbecenses (Essenbæk årbogen)
- Annales Lundenses (Lunde årbogen)
- Annales Nestvedienses 821-1300 (Den Yngre Næstved årbog)
- Annales Nestvedienses 1130-1228 (Den Ældre Næstved årbog)
- Annales Ripenses (Ribe årbogen)
- Annales Ryenses (Ryd årbogen) (sometimes also known as Chronicon Erici Regis)
- Annales Scanici (Skaanske årbog)
- Annales Slesuicenses (Slesvig årbog 1270)
- Annales Sorani 1130-1300 (Den Yngre Sorø årbog)
- Annales Sorani 1202-1347 (Den Ældre Sorø årbog)
- Annales Waldemariani (Valdemar årbogen)
- Annales 67 –1287
- Annales 980-1286
- Annales 841-1006
- Annales 1095-1194
- Annales 1098-1325
- Annales 1101-1313 (Annaludtog 1101-1313)
- Annales 1246-1265
- Annales 1259-1286
- Annales 1275-1347 (Årbogfragment 1275-1347)
- Annalibus Dano-Suecani 826-1415 (Dansk-Svensk årbog 826-1415)
- Collectanea Petri Olai (Franciskanermunken Peder Olsens Collectanea)

== Laws ==
- Codex Holmiensis (Jyske Lov)
- Valdemar's Zealandic Law (Valdemars Sjællandske Lov)
- Erik's Zealandic Law (Eriks Sjællandske Lov)
- Codex Runicus (Skaanske Lov)

== Lists ==
- Series Regum Danie ex Necrologio Lundensi
- Catalogus Regum Danie
- Series ac breuior historia regum Danie
- Reges Danorum
- Nomina Regum Danorum
- Wilhelmi Abbatis Genealogia Regum Danorum
- Incerti Auctoris Genealogia Regum Daniæ

== Others ==
- Planctus de captiuitate regum Danorum
- Planctus de statu regni Danie
