= Assentoft =

- Town
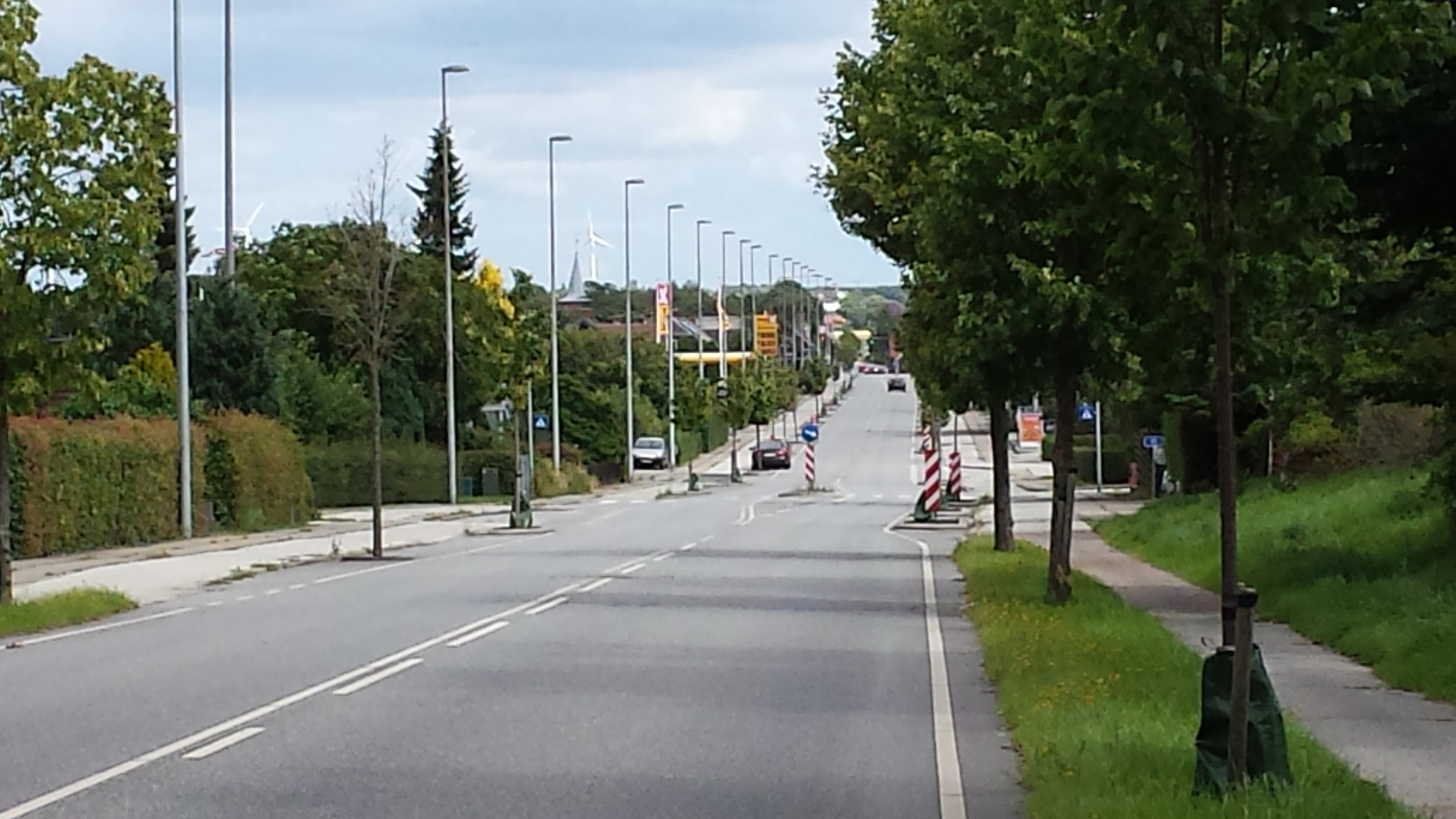
- Storegade, the town's main street.

- Assentoft Denmark Assentoft (Central Denmark Region)
- Coordinates: 56.440724°N 10.148697°E
- Country: Denmark
- Region: Central Denmark (Midtjylland)
- Municipality: Randers

Area
  - Urban: 2.9 km^{2} (1.1 sq mi)

Population (2026)
  - Urban: 3,985
  - Urban density: 1,400/km^{2} (3,600/sq mi)
- Demonym: Esking
- Time zone: UTC+1 (Central Europe Time)
  - Summer (DST): UTC+2
- Postal code: DK-8960 Randers SØ
- Area code: (+45) 8

Assentoft is a Danish town on the peninsula of Jutland with a population of 3,985 in 2026. The town is located eight kilometers east of Randers, and is a part of the Randers Municipality in the Central Denmark Region.

== History ==
=== Prehistory ===
In Assentoft, remains of e.g. a round barrow with a grave from the Stone Age, two round barrows from antiquity, a settlement from the late Bronze Age, and another settlement which seems to have been inhabited from the late Stone Age to the late Iron Age have been found.

==== Name ====
In place names, the last syllable, -toft, means "the adapted", and refers to an area in which a house is built. A toft was therefore potentially an area specified for settlement by a farm owner in a village. Names with -toft are mainly from the Viking Age, as there are many names with -toft in England and Normandy.

In settlement names with –toft, the first part of the name is often a Nordic first name—in this case perhaps Asgun. However, in some cases, the first part refers to animals, terrain, or vegetation, and the first part of Assentoft's name is probably the Old Danish word æsking, which means "ash stand". An inhabitant of Assentoft is also supposedly called an Esking.

=== Early history ===
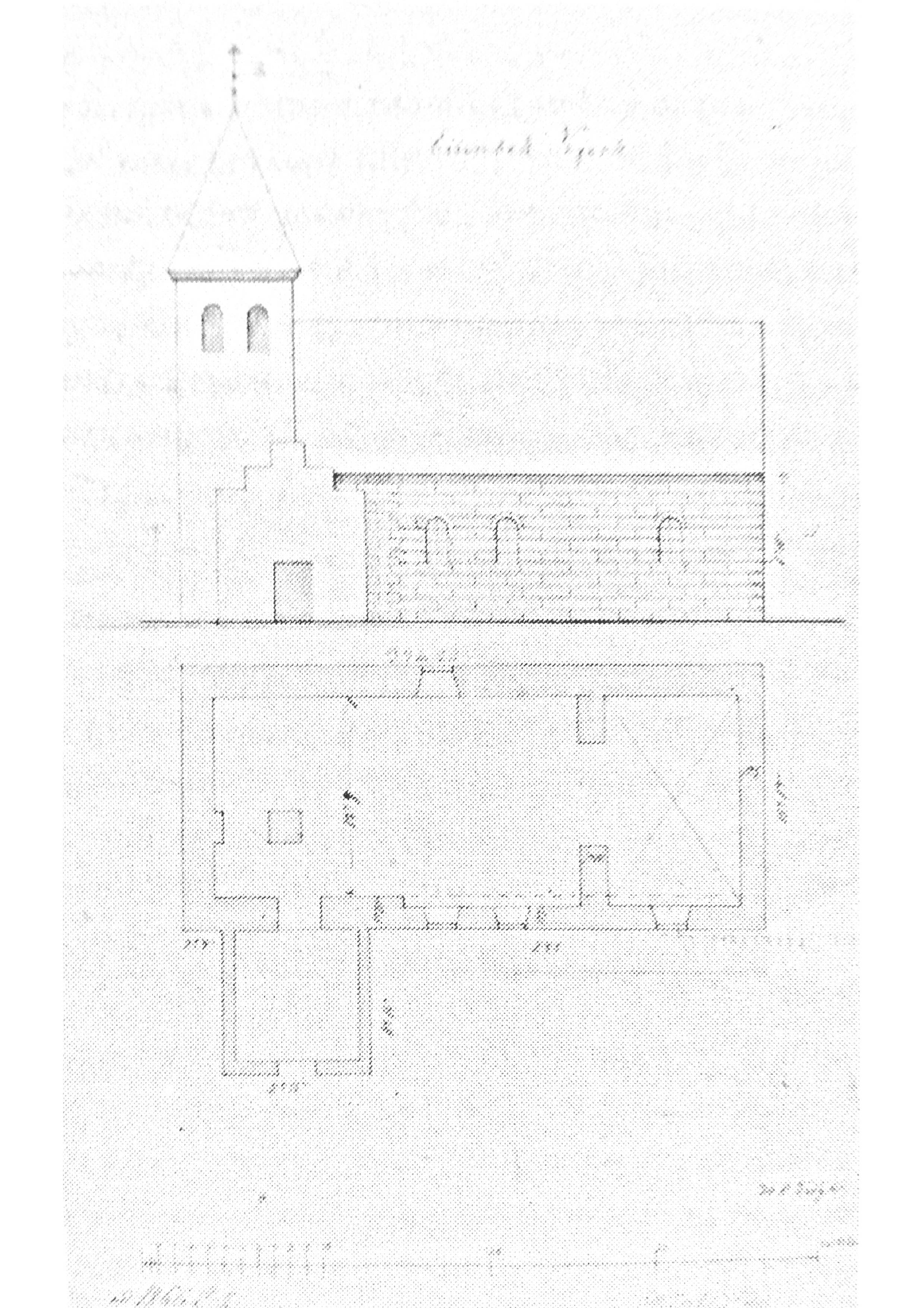
Old Essenbæk Church in ca. 1865.

In the era of the Hundreds of Denmark, Haldherred built the church Essenbæk (Eskingbec) in approximately the 12th century CE in the middle of Essenbæk Parish, which was an annex of Virring Parish. Most of Essenbæk Parish was tenured to Essenbæk Abbey, and as of March 9, 1467, Essenbæk Farm (Æskinbechgard; Essenbækgård) has stood by the church.

=== Modern history ===
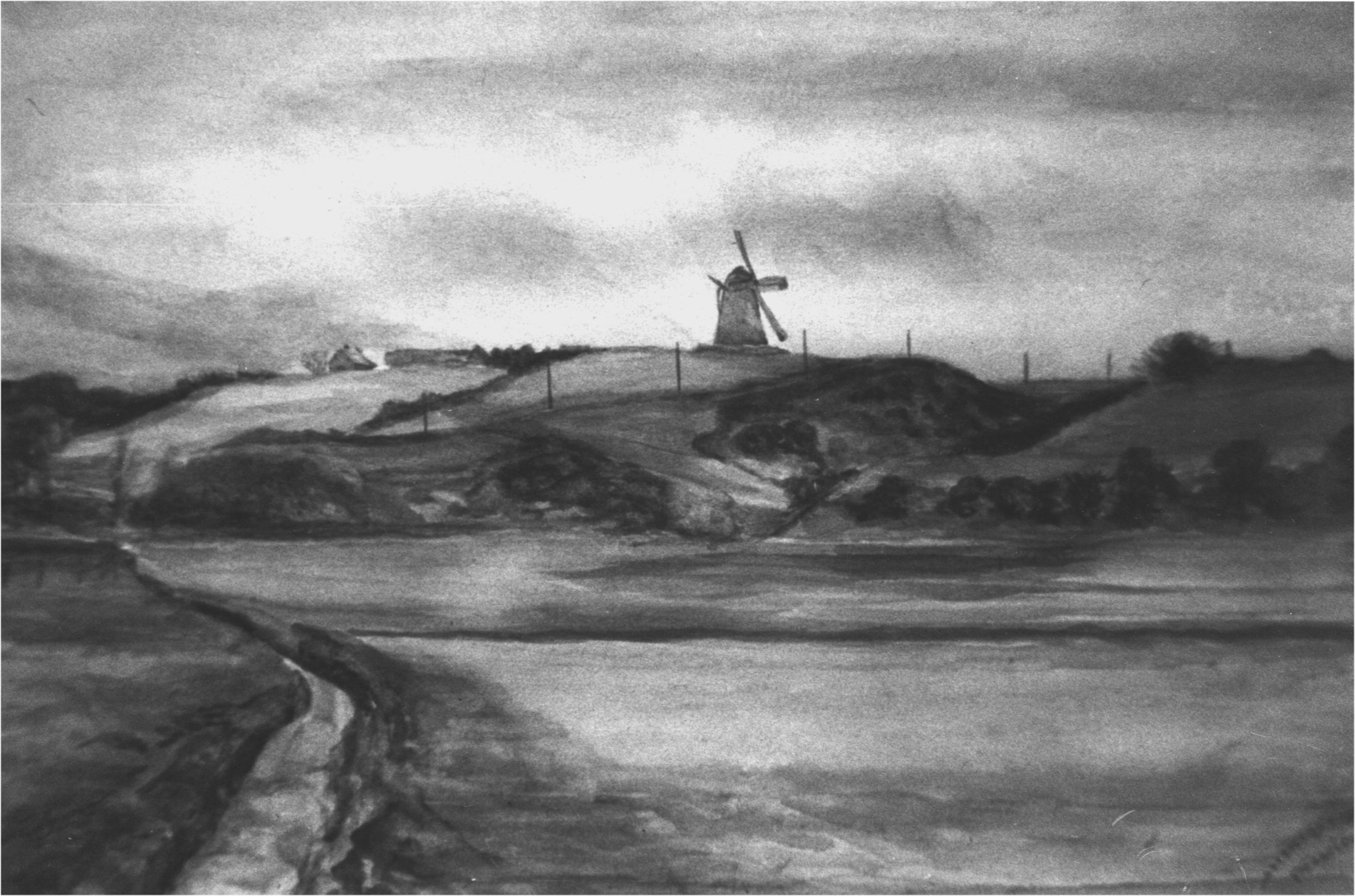
Essenbæk Farm (left) and Essenbæk Mill (middle) in 1921.

After the Reformation in Denmark, the king confiscated Essenbæk Abbey and its estate in 1540, and established Assentoft (Assentofftt) in 1579. When Essenbæk Farm and Essenbæk Mill (Essenbech Møllested; Essenbæk Mølle) were acquired on August 22, 1661 from the king by Hans Friis, there were 10 farms, four smallholdings and five houses in Assentoft. The town's location on moraine hills reveals that agriculture was prioritized there, and cattle were probably kept on the meadows below the town.

On March 18, 1695, Hans Friis gave Essenbæk Home Farm (Essenbæk Ladegård) and its adjoining estates to his nephew Christian Friis, who incorporated them into the entailed estate of Tustrup on February 15, 1726. In 1739, the estate owner established a school in Assentoft, but on October 30, 1782, the king gave permission to sell the estate. Essenbæk Home Farm was sold at auction at Tustrup December 18, 1783 to Christian Kallager, and on June 11, 1785, the deed was signed.

On June 10, 1787, Kallager sold it to Peter Severin Fønss and Johan Frederik Carøe. Essenbæk Farm was sold again in 1789 to Niels Christensen Kutsch, and during the next year, Assentoft was sold to the tenant farmers in the village. When they divided it among themselves on July 15, 1790, there were nine whole farms, two half farms, four smallholdings, and four houses in Assentoft.

Within each pastorage, a main parish and its annex(es) were established in 1803, and were called a municipal parish, which from January 1, 1868 was called parish municipality. One of the municipalities was the Virring-Essenbæk Municipality, which included Assentoft.

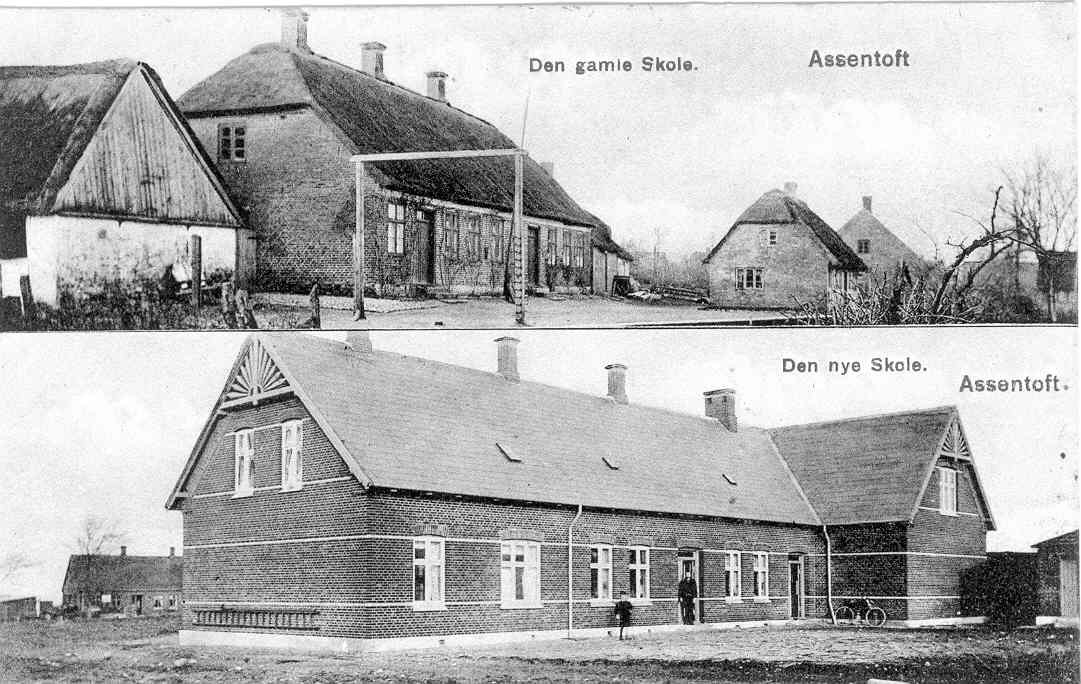
The schools from 1840 (top) and 1907 (bottom).

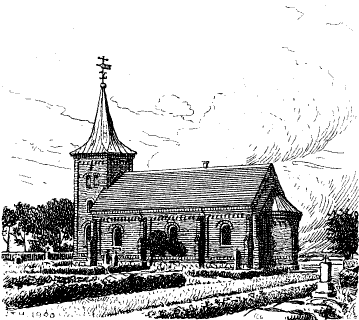
Essenbæk Church in ca. 1901.

In 1840, a new and larger school was built in the village. The decrepit church in Essenbæk Parish was torn down in the autumn of 1865, and on November 28, 1869, the consecration of a new Essenbæk Church in Assentoft occurred. At that time, the village was growing north of the highway.

In Assentoft, the Savings and Loans Bank of Virring and Essenbæk Parishes (Virring og Essenbæk Sognes Spare- og Laanekasse) was established in 1871. To provide medical assistance for its members, the Craftmen's Society of Essenbæk Parish (Essenbæk Sogns Haandværkerforening) was established on March 6 of the same year, and in the summer of 1889, the society built the Foundation of the Craftmen's Society of Essenbæk Parish (Essenbæk Sogns Haandværkerforenings Stiftelse), which was known as Assentoft's village hall; it included a taproom, a gathering hall, and six free retirement homes. Assentoft Waterworks (Assentoft Vandværk) was established on May 15, 1895.

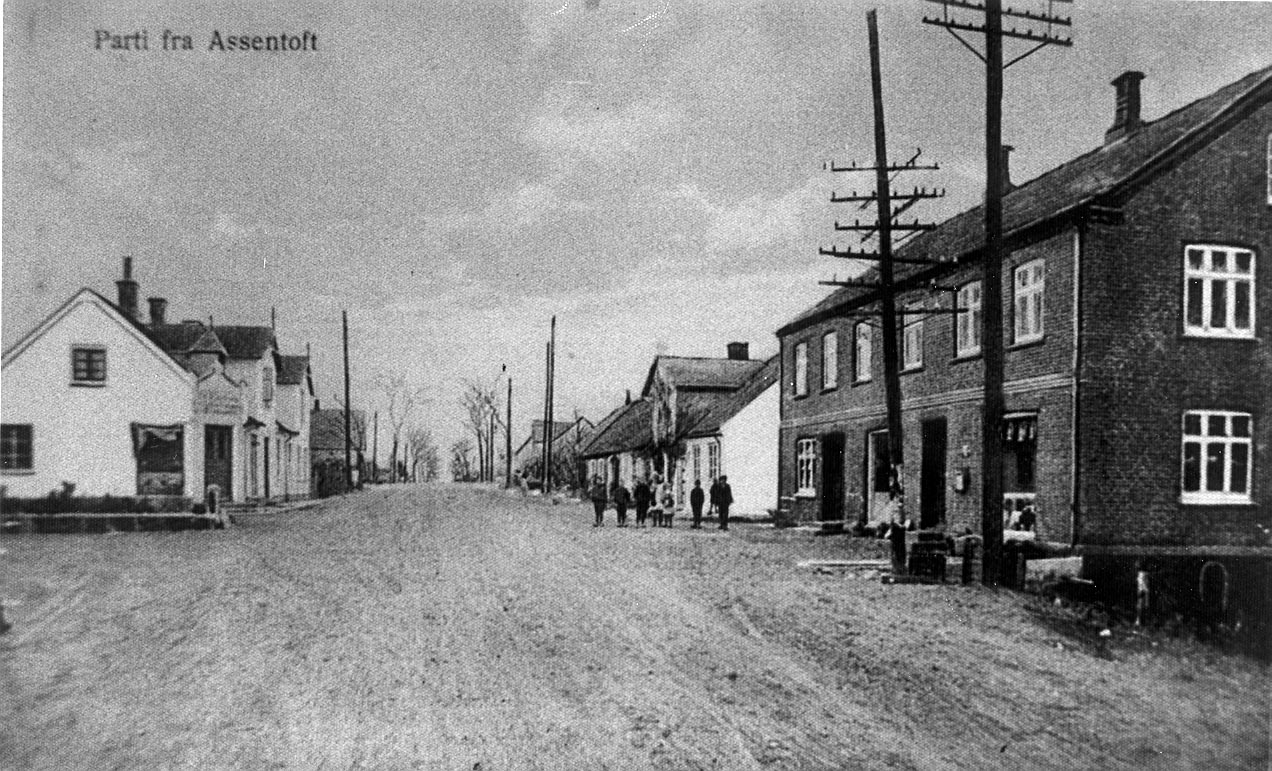
Storegade in ca. 1920, with Assentoft Co-operative Society's store nearest on the right.

On January 26, 1900, the Assentoft Cooperative Society (Assentoft Brugsforening) was established; its newly built store opened for sale on July 1 of the same year. In 1907, a newer and larger school was built in the village, and Essenbæk Mill, which was rebuilt after a fire on April 23, 1889, was torn down in 1922.

On July 23, 1937, motorcycle racing occurred for the first time on the Volk Mill (Volk Mølle) hills at Essenbæk Farm. The racetrack was ca. 300 meters long with a steep elevation, and motorcycles were converted on site to race there. In 1939, the Assentoft Sports Club (Assentoft Idrætsforening) was established and has participated in series football ever since.

All motorcycling races were suspended while the Second World War was fought, but in 1946, hill climbing for motorcycles was raced on the Volk Mill hills. From that time, many of the races on the track could attract 10,000-20,000 spectators. In 1949, the only Danish hill climbing championship was raced there.

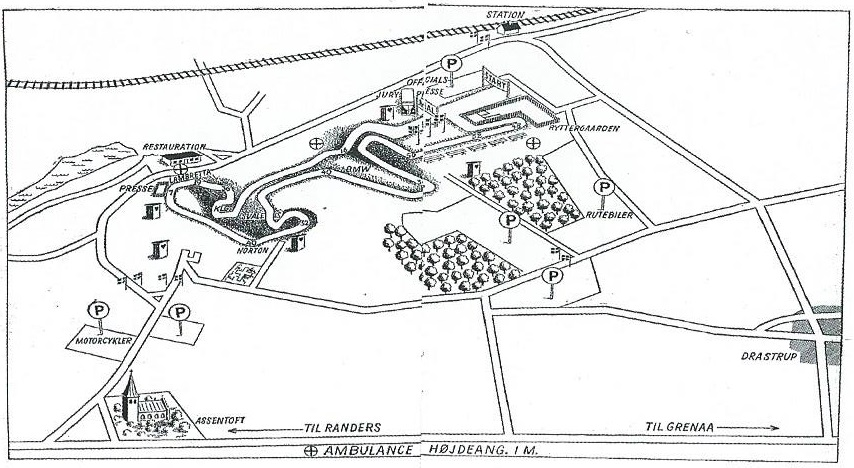
The motocross track on Volk Mill hills in 1955

Motocross was first raced on Volk Mill hills on April 20, 1951. The track raced on was 750 meters long. In the autumn of 1954, a 2,500-meter-long track was approved by an international track inspection, and on August 28, 1955, Motocross des Nations was raced there with 24 participants and ca. 40,000 spectators. The first photograph elected as the World Press Photo of the Year shows a race participant that crashed on the track.

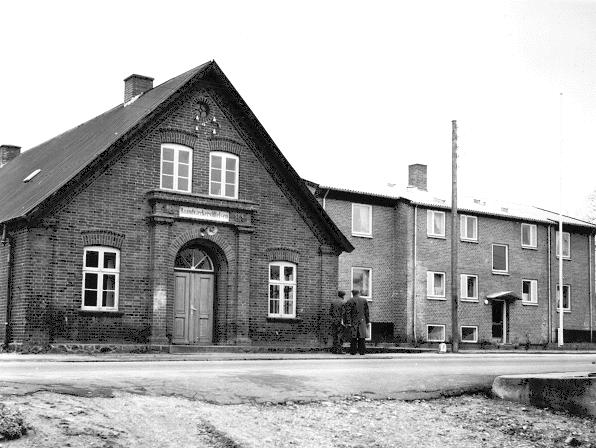
The village hall (left) and Essenbæk House (right) in the 1960s.

During 1954, there were no retirement homes in the village hall, as they were outmoded, but on November 6, 1957, the new Essenbæk House (Essenbækhus) was opened as a retirement home in the village hall's previous kitchen garden.

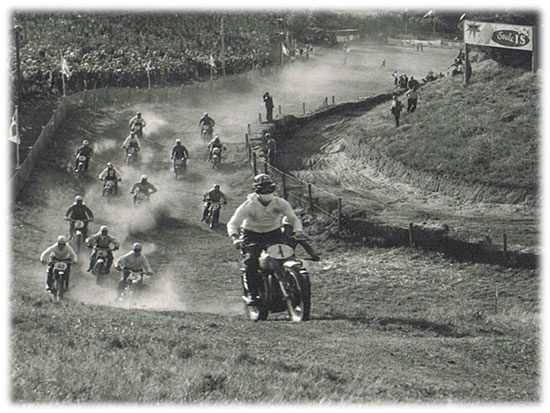
The European motocross championship's final on Volk Mill hills September 2, 1956.

In the 1950s and 1960s, several national and international motocross races, including world championships and both European and Danish championships, occurred on the Volk Mill hills, and trials occurred on the hills from the beginning of the 1960s. The village's first single-family home neighborhoods were also established at the start of the 1960s; they were built near the western part of Assentoft. Assentoft Sports Club was united with the Langkastrup Gymnastics Association (Langkastrup Gymnastikforening) as Sønderhald Sports Club (Sønderhald Idrætsforening) on April 25, 1964.

In 1966, the Savings and Loans Bank of Virring and Essenbæk Parishes was acquired by the Savings Bank for Randers Town and Environs (Sparekassen for Randers By og Omegn), and in 1968, the village hall was sold; it was refashioned as Assentoft Inn (Assentoft Kro). That same year, the last race with spectators occurred on Volk Mill hills, and in 1969, the last training race occurred there.

Virring-Essenbæk Municipality was superseded on April 1, 1970 by Sønderhald Municipality, and on November 11, 1970, it decided to establish the residential area of Assentoft East (Assentoft Øst) by Essenbæk Farm. After February 28, 1973, the municipality decided to expand its residential area with parts of the nearby village (Drastrup) such as the Sønderhald School (Sønderhaldskolen), which is now nearly surrounded by Assentoft.

The Sønderhald School was built from June to October, 1975, and a sports hall, Assentoft Gymnasium (Assentofthallen), was opened for use on October 25 of the same year. The Essenbæk School (Essenbækskolen) was built near the Sønderhald School in 1979. A second sports hall was built in Assentoft and opened on November 14, 1980. A community center added to the Assentoft Gymnasiums (Assentofthallerne, which the two sports halls are collectively called) was opened for use in the spring of 1981.

On November 12, 1986, Randers Municipality decided to establish the industrial area of Virkevangen in Assentoft East, and in 1989, the Sønderhald School and the Essenbæk School were united as the Assentoft School (Assentoftskolen). Sønderhald Sports Club became SIF Assentoft in June 2011.

The growth of Assentoft

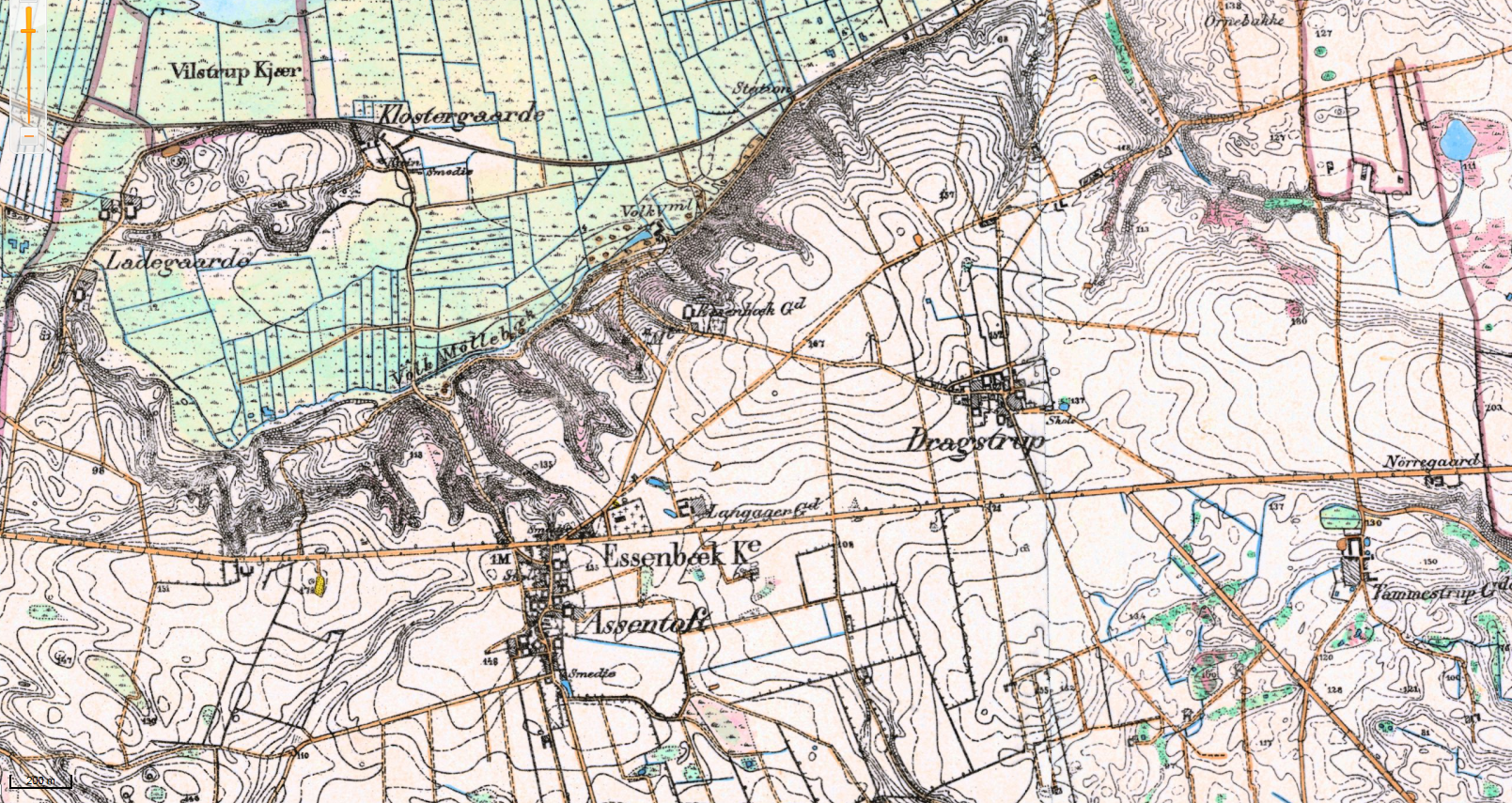
Map from 1899

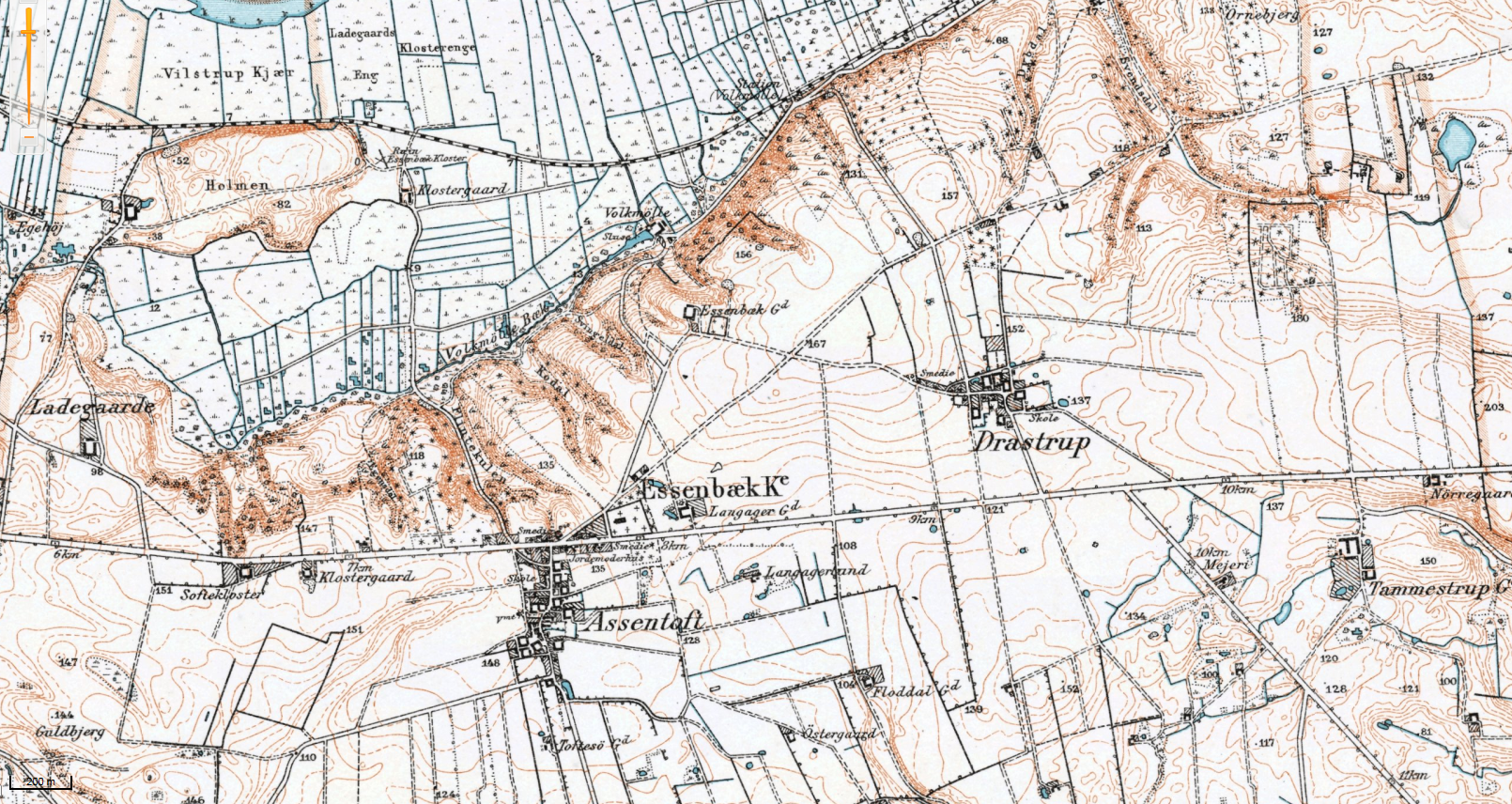
Map from 1971

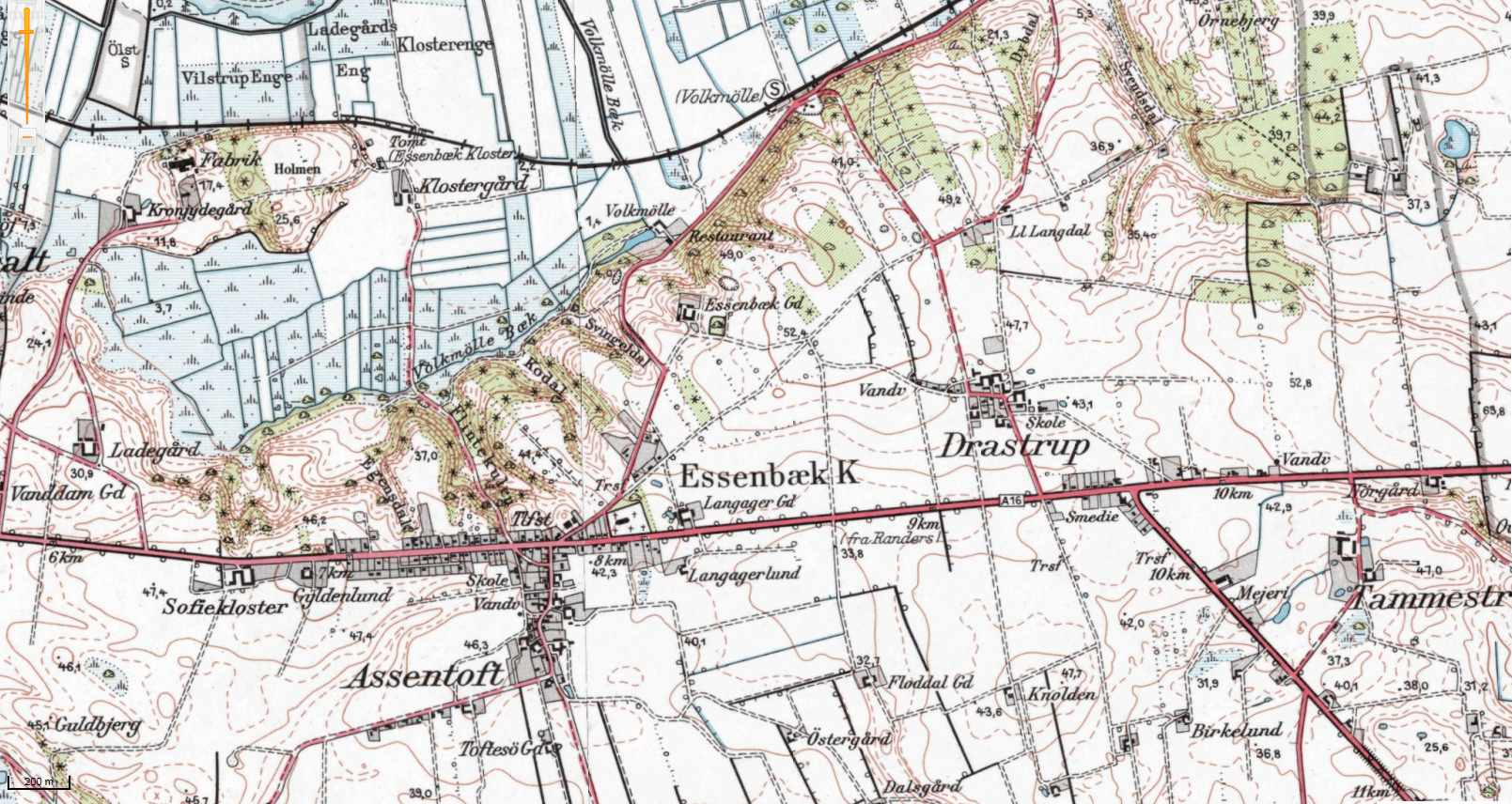
Map from 1976

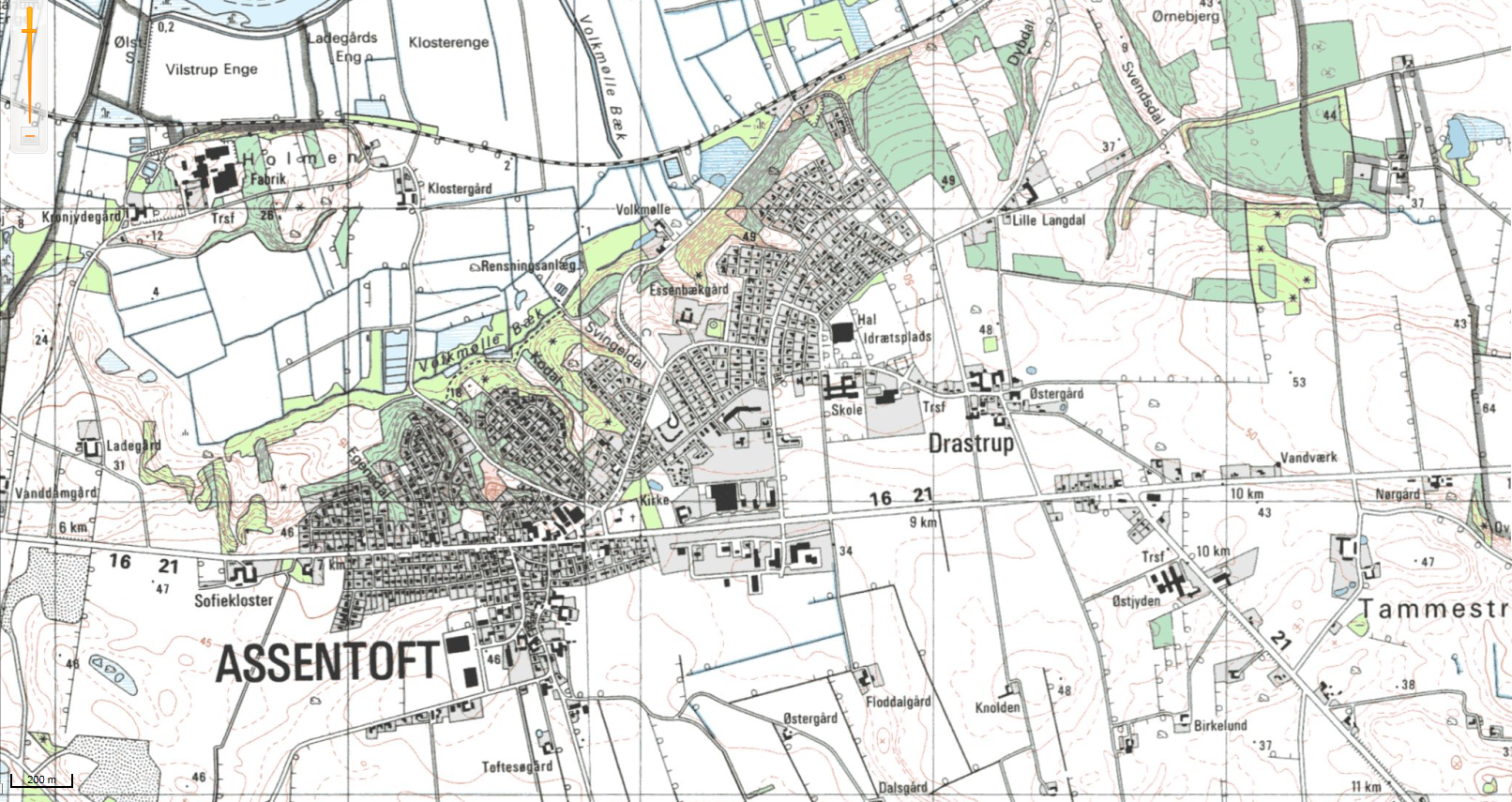
Map from 2001

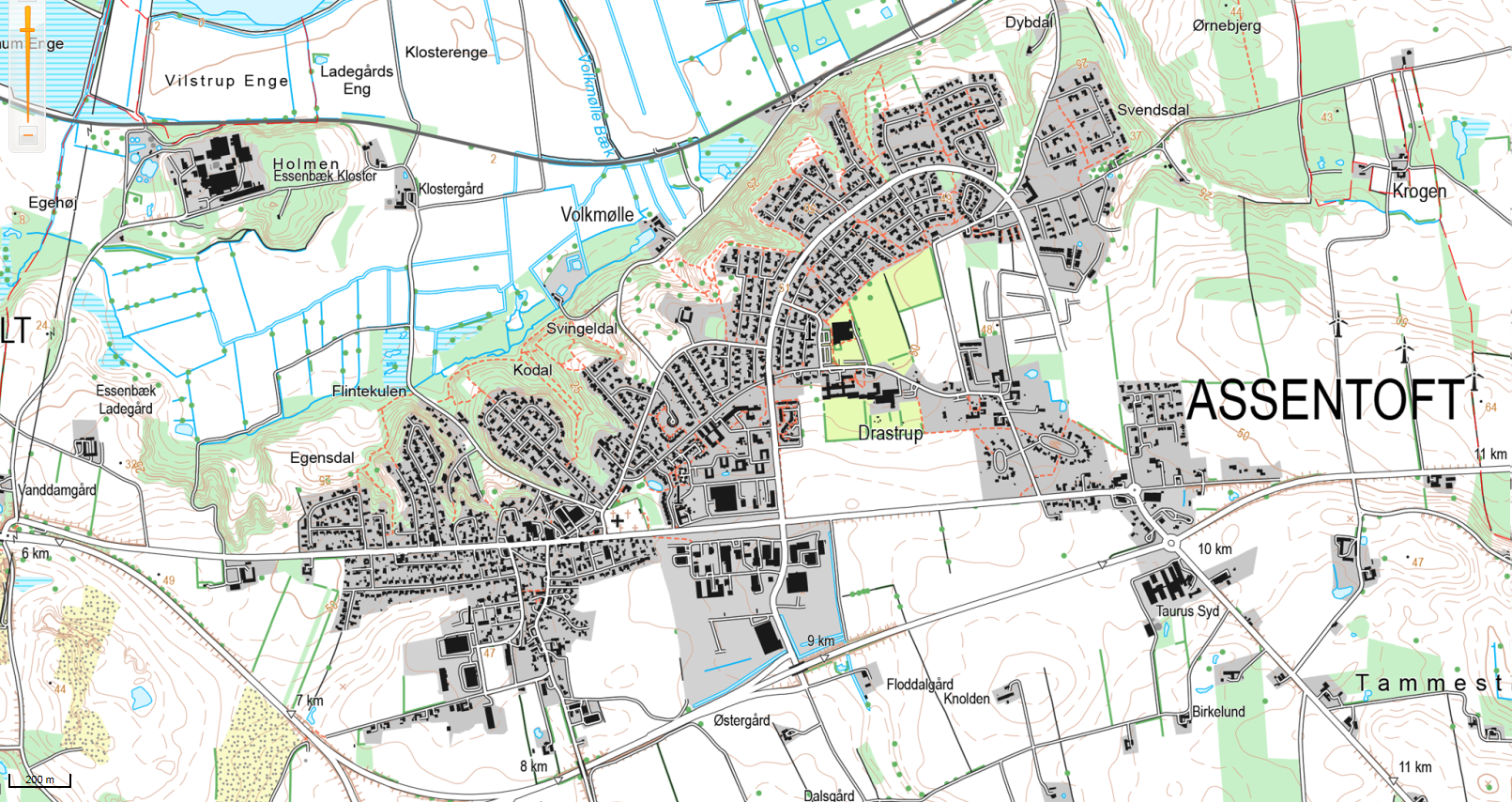
Map from 2016

=== Demography ===
Population
1787	106	1984	2,204	1999	2,265	2012	3,311
1938	Ca. 350	1985	2,241	2000	2,325	2013	3,360
1960	535	1986	2,265	2001	2,380	2014	3,383
1965	743	1989	2,376	2002	2,415	2015	3,387
1970	1,136	1990	2,373	2003	2,406	2016	3,427
1976	1,779	1992	2,306	2004	2,465		
1979	2,041	1994	2,268	2006	2,734		
1981	2,185	1996	2,235	2008	2,981		
1982	2,200	1997	2,238	2010	3,205		
1983	2,188	1998	2,210	2011	3,262		

== Geography ==
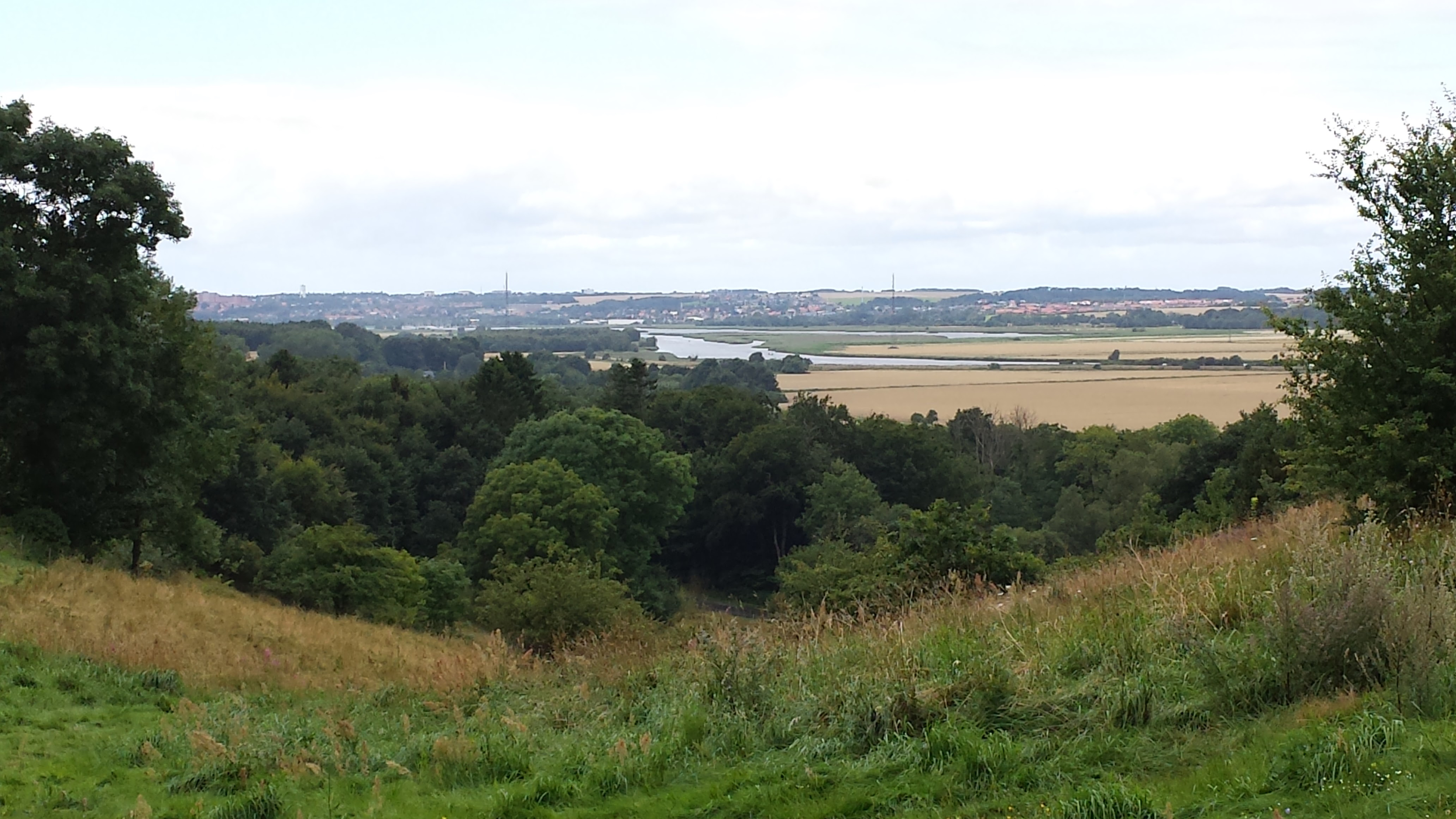
View across Randers Fjord from Volk Mill hills.

Most of Assentoft's northern rim lies on the top of a ca. 50 meters high slope between riverine meadows and moraine hills south of Randers Fjord. Assentoft's erosion gullies are wooded, and promontories are used for the growth of the town. However, certain parts of the town lie on steep plots closely surrounded by wood and meadows, and roe deer can be seen grazing in gardens nearby. From the town's southern side, the flatter moraine landscape is seen.

== Infrastructure ==
The infrastructure in Assentoft consists primarily of residential streets. The town's residential areas east of the Grenå Road, which is south of Assentoft, relieve Storegade, which is also characterized as residential street.

== Business ==
The town contains services, industries, and some retail stores along Storegade.

Assentoft Silo A/S, which produces low-oxygen steel silos, was established in the summer of 1940.

== Education ==
The Assentoft School is the largest state school in Randers Municipality, having 750 pupils (2013).

== Notable people ==
- Michael Aastrup Jensen (born 1976), politician, Mayor of Randers Town Council in 2002, aged 26.
