= Essenbæk Church =

- Essenbæk Kirke
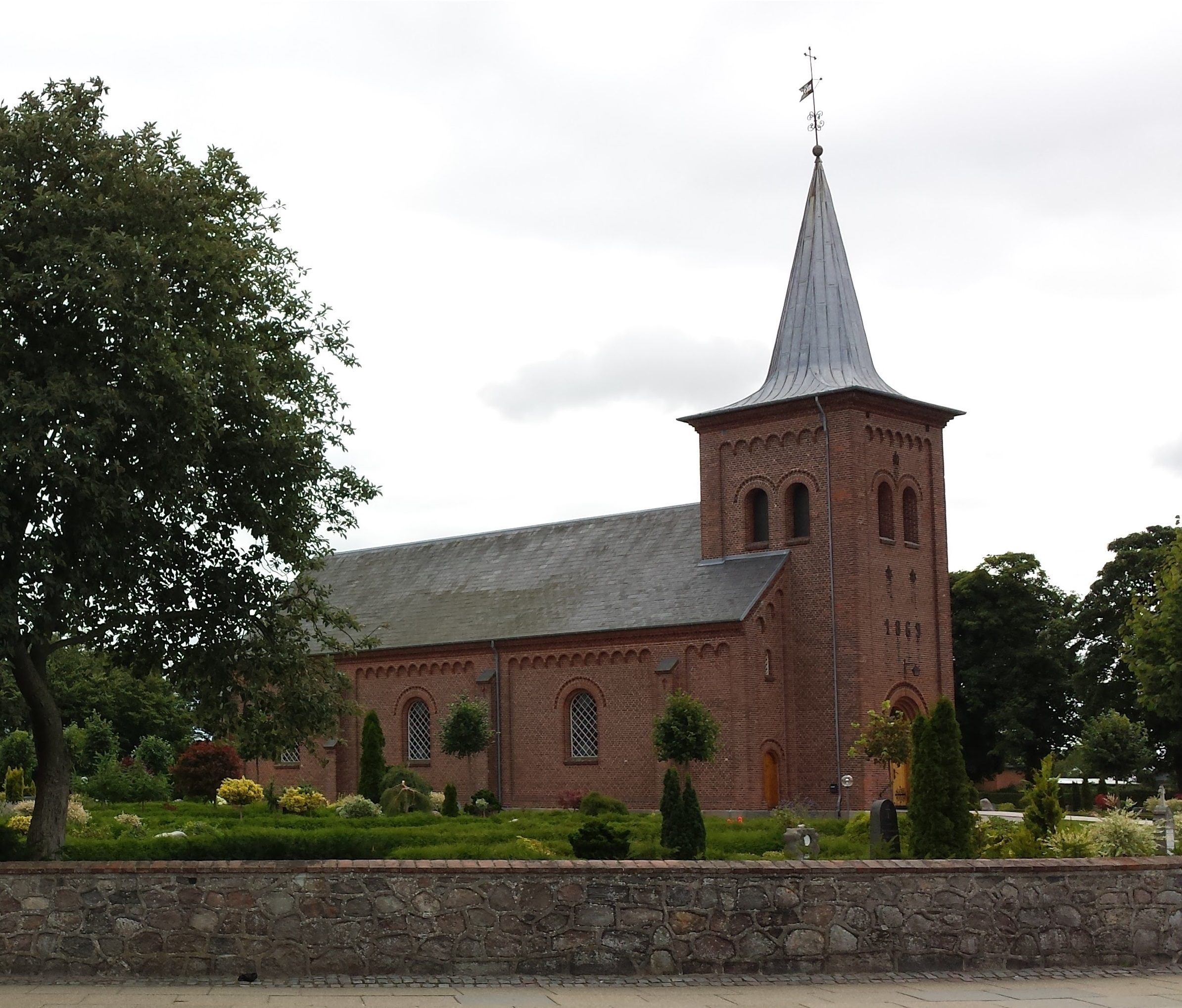

- Location in Denmark
- 56°26′26.6064″N 10°8′55.3092″E
- Location: Volkmøllevej 2, 8960 Randers SØ
- Country: Denmark
- Denomination: Church of Denmark
- Website: http://defiresogne.dk/essenbaek-kirke-og-kirkegaard/

History
- Status: Active
- Founder: Jørgen (Christensen) count Scheel
- Consecrated: November 28, 1869

Architecture
- Functional status: Parish church
- Architect: Johannes Frederik (Frits) Christian Uldall
- Style: Round-arch
- Groundbreaking: October 1868
- Completed: 1869

Administration
- Diocese: Aarhus
- Deanery: Randers Southern
- Parish: Essenbæk

Essenbæk Church (Danish: Essenbæk Kirke) is a parish church in Assentoft, Denmark. It oversees Essenbæk Parish in Randers Southern Provostship within the Diocese of Aarhus.

A church is believed to have existed on the site since the 12th century. Old Essenbæk Church stood on the site until 1865, when it was torn down to construct a new church. The current church was completed in 1869 in the Romanesque style.

== History ==
=== Old Essenbæk Church ===
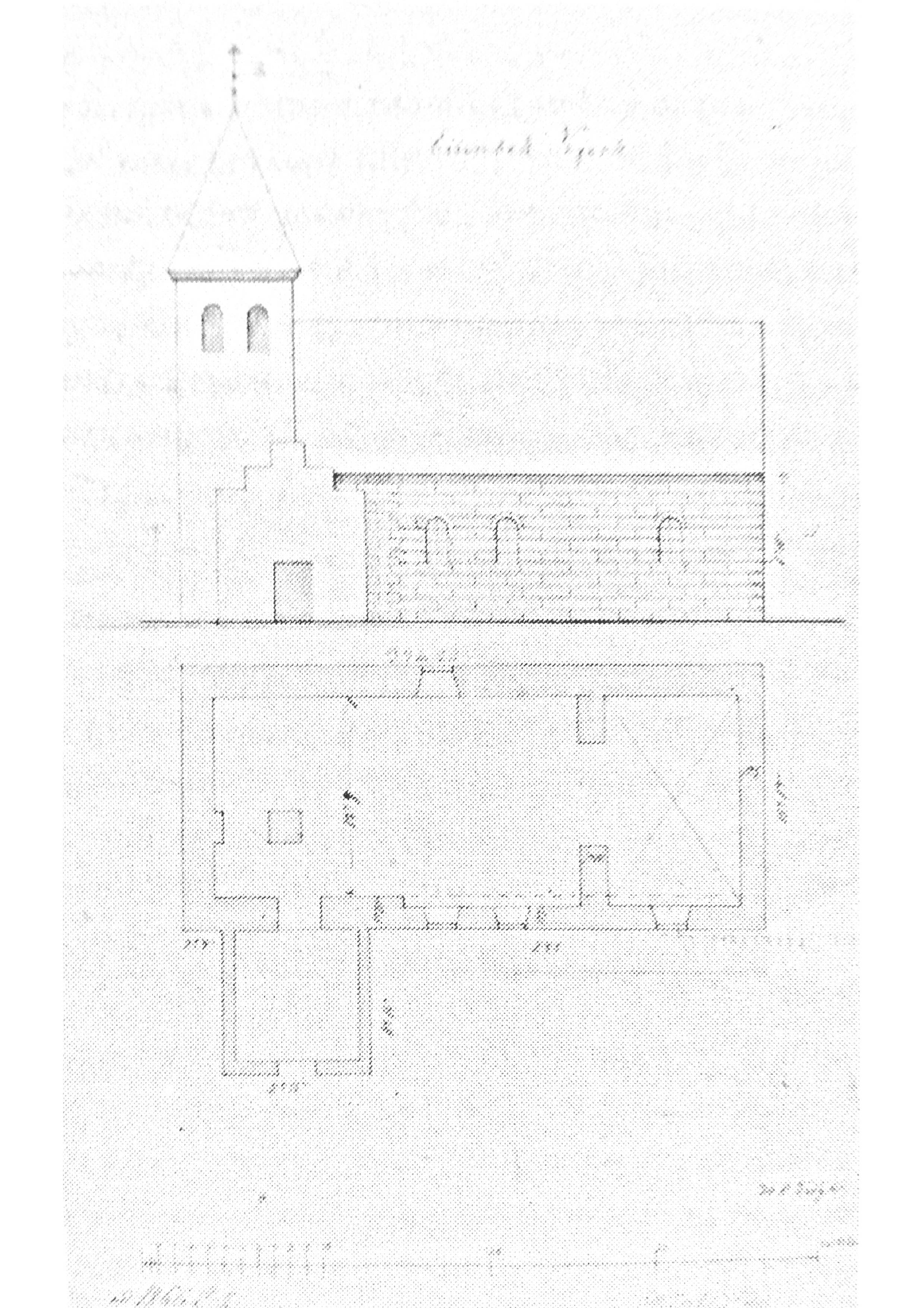
Old Essenbæk Church in ca. 1865.

An earlier church was built on a hill in the hundred Haldherred probably in the 12th century, and is known from the 13th century as Essenbæk (Eskingbec) - a name which perhaps refers to the present Volkmølle Creek (Volkmølle Bæk). The first particle esking supposedly means an inhabitant of Assentoft, but the creek seems later to have been named after a fulling mill (valkemølle), which in time, however, was used as gristmill.

The church was first built in Romanesque style as a nave and probably a chancel – internally consisting of granite boulders built around raw fieldstone, and externally of granite ashlars. On the northern and southern side of the church were a simple rectangular entrance, and the ceiling of the church was flat and plastery. Later the chancel was torn down, after which the eastern end of the nave, demarcated by an ogival chancel arch, was used as such, and the northern entrance was walled up. Probably also later a small round arched window was established on the northern side, and a steeple resting on five pillars built into the nave and with pyramid roof of lead was added above the southwestern corner of the church. A church porch at the southern entrance and a groin vault seem added in the 15th century. Then the church was internally 31¾ alen (19.93 meters) long og 12¼ alen (7.69 meters) wide. The church stood in the northwestern corner of a ca. 65 meters long og 65 meters wide churchyard fenced in by a 1.5 meter high boulder dike, southwesterly in which was a driving gate and a walking gate in a whitewashed portal in late Medieval style of large medieval brick.

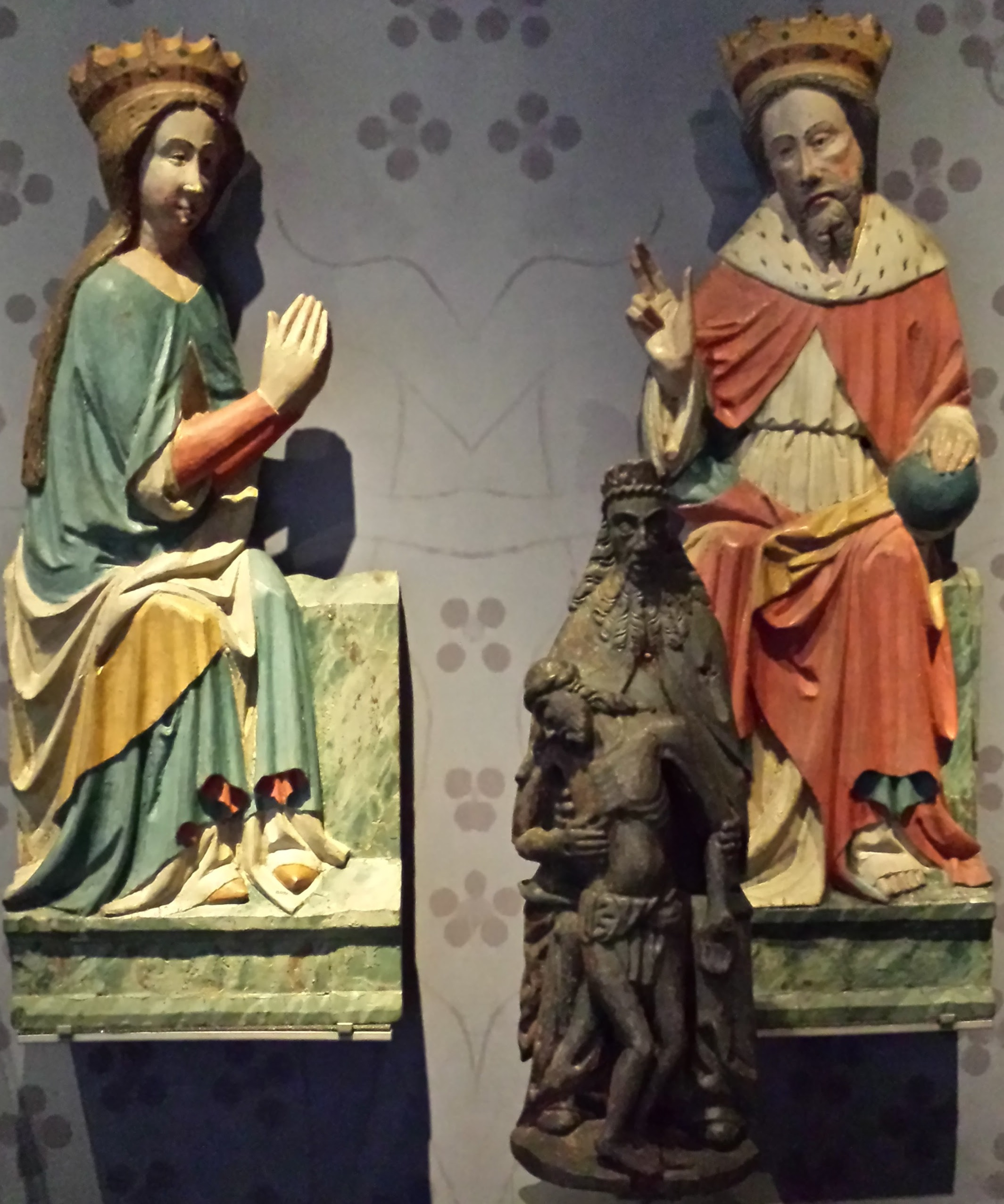
Figurines from ca. 1475 representing Mary (left) and Christ (right) from Old Essenbæk Church's triptych, and a figurine (middle) from the 15th century representing the "Mercy Seat" from one of the church's two bye-altars.

Already September 4, 1424 the church was called Old Essenbæk (Danish: Gammel Essenbæk), and was then owned by Essenbæk Abbey, which together with its estate was confiscated by the king in 1540. When the abbey was later torn down, its bell was taken to the church.

Christen Skel Jørgensen bought September 7, 1678 "the church's share of the tithe of the mentioned parishes, the appurtenant easement over the parsonages and the smallholdings of the parish clerks and all of the churches' adjoining land estate and other appurtenant easement and the right of presentation" (Kirkens Andel af Tienden af de nævnte Sogne, Herligheden over Præstegaardene og Degnebolene og alt Kirkernes tilliggende Jordegods og anden Herlighed samt Kaldsretten) including e.g. Essenbæk Parish. With this so-called right of patronage he was in reality the owner of the church, though with the responsibility for its condition.

When the art historian N. L. Høyen in 1830 visited Essenbæk Church, he drew e.g. its baptismal font. However, when in the summer of 1865 the architect Johannes Frederik (Frits) Christian Uldall visited the church, there stood another baptismal font – this one in Baroque style of wood, and representing a kneeling figure bearing a basin.

=== Deconstruction ===
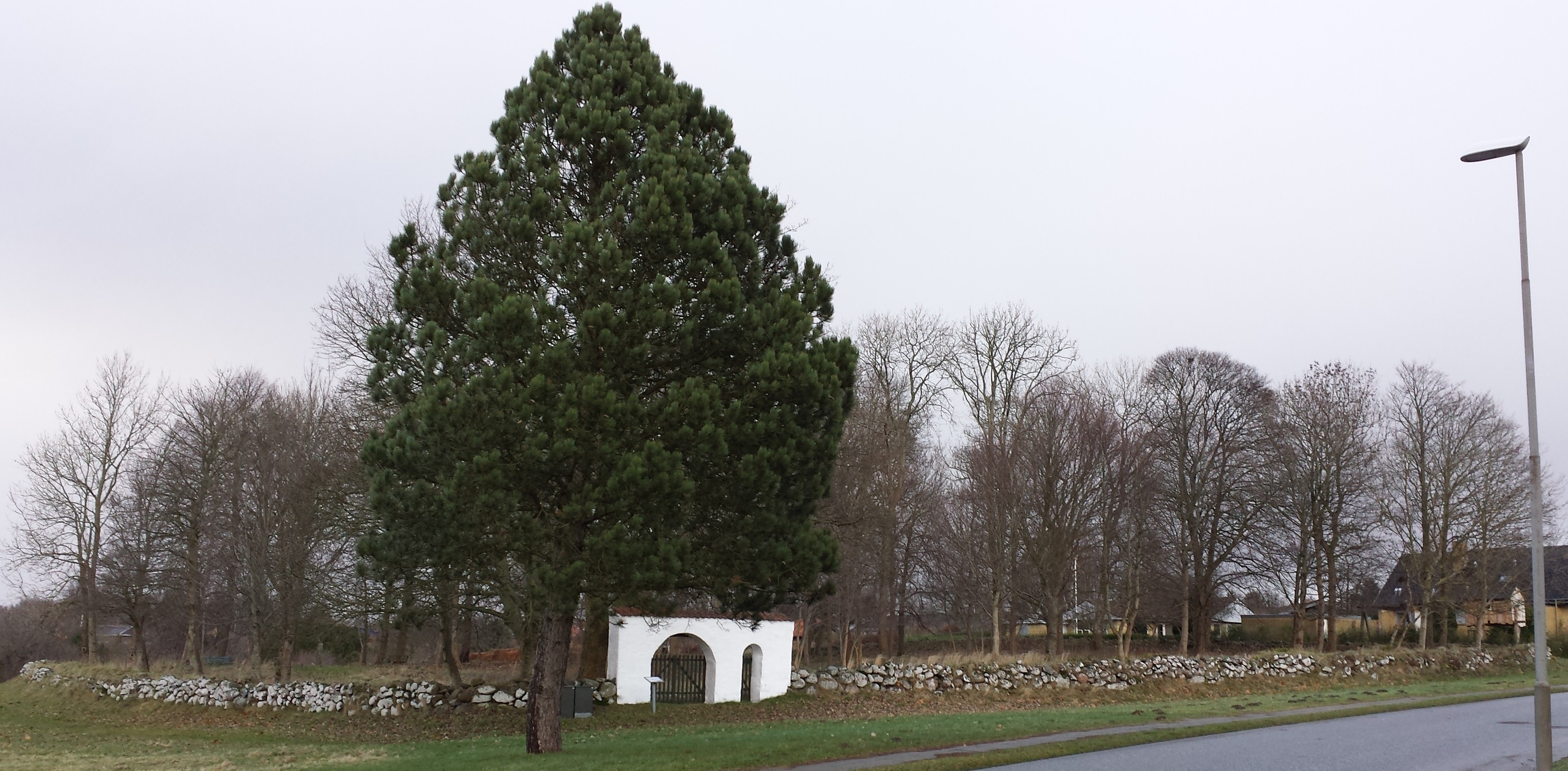
Old Essenbæk Church Site

In the autumn of 1865 the then decrepit church was torn down, but the churchyard was preserved, and was used some years still. Some of the church's furniture, including 10 of the triptych's figurines representing the 12 Apostles, were sold at auction, but the figurines representing the apostles James the Just and Peter were taken by the mason N. Schunck, who participated at the demolition. In 1894 he gave them to Randers Museum, and two years later Countess Christiane Scheel gave the triptych's figurines representing Christ and Mary to the museum. In 1910 a monument was erected on the churchyard, and in 1971 wooden gates were added to the then tile-hung portal in the churchyard dike. Around the monument, the corners of the church are indicated now by edge-raised natural stones.

=== The new church ===
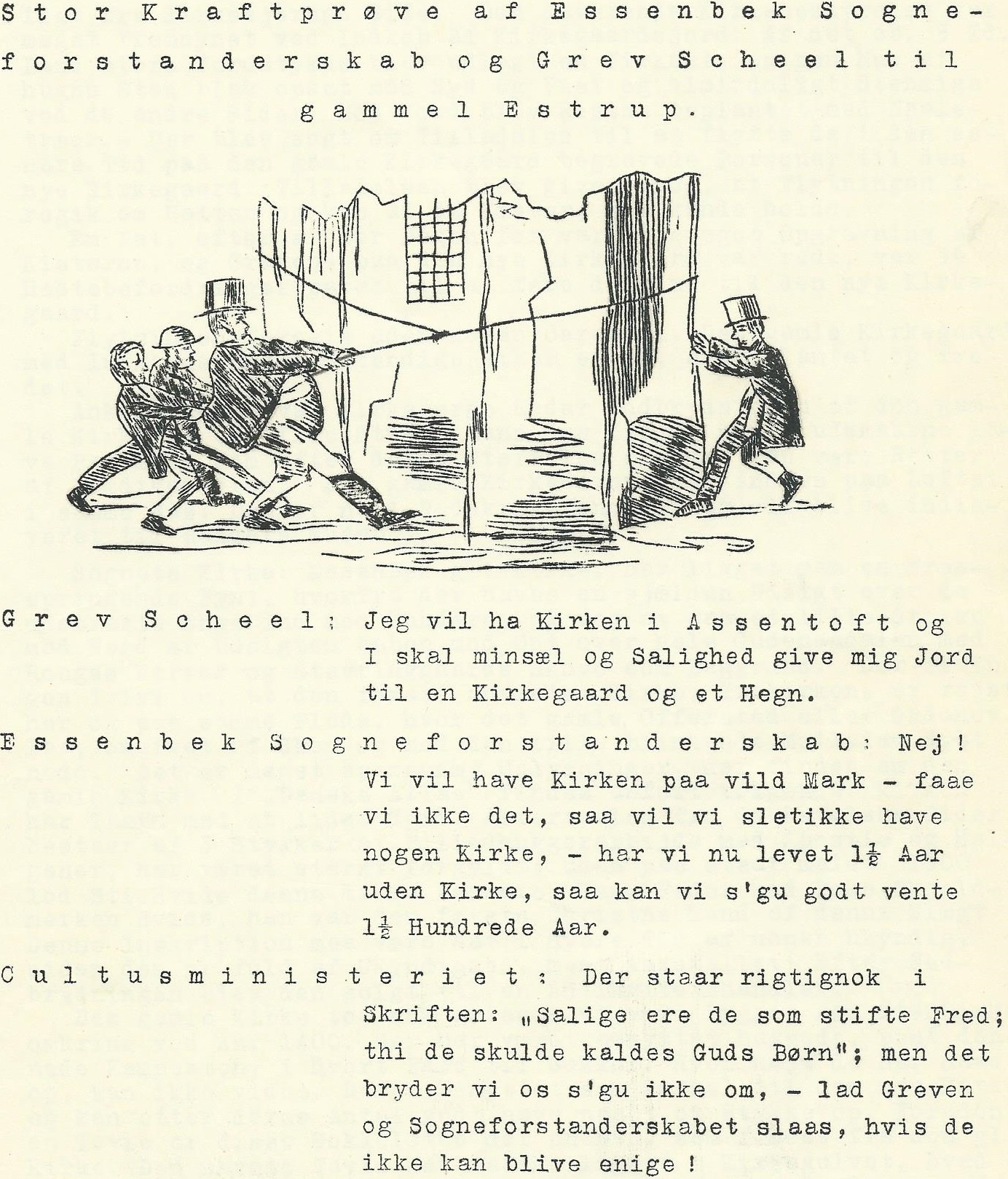
Caricature depiction of the debate over the new church's location from the satirical periodical Folkets Nisse, August 10, 1867.

The "church owner" wanted to build a new church in Assentoft, but the local parish superintendency would that a new church like the old one should stand outside the village. The Ministry for Ecclesiastical Affairs and Public Instruction, which mediated communication between the two parties, estimated in 1866 that they could not agree, but in October 1868 the construction of a new church was begun in Assentoft. It was the first church that Frits Uldall designed, and November 28, 1869 the new Essenbæk Church was consecrated by Bishop Brammer. Its bell was recast in 1885.

After the "church owner" requested to be exempt from liability for the church's condition, the church in 1913 became self-governing.

== Architecture ==
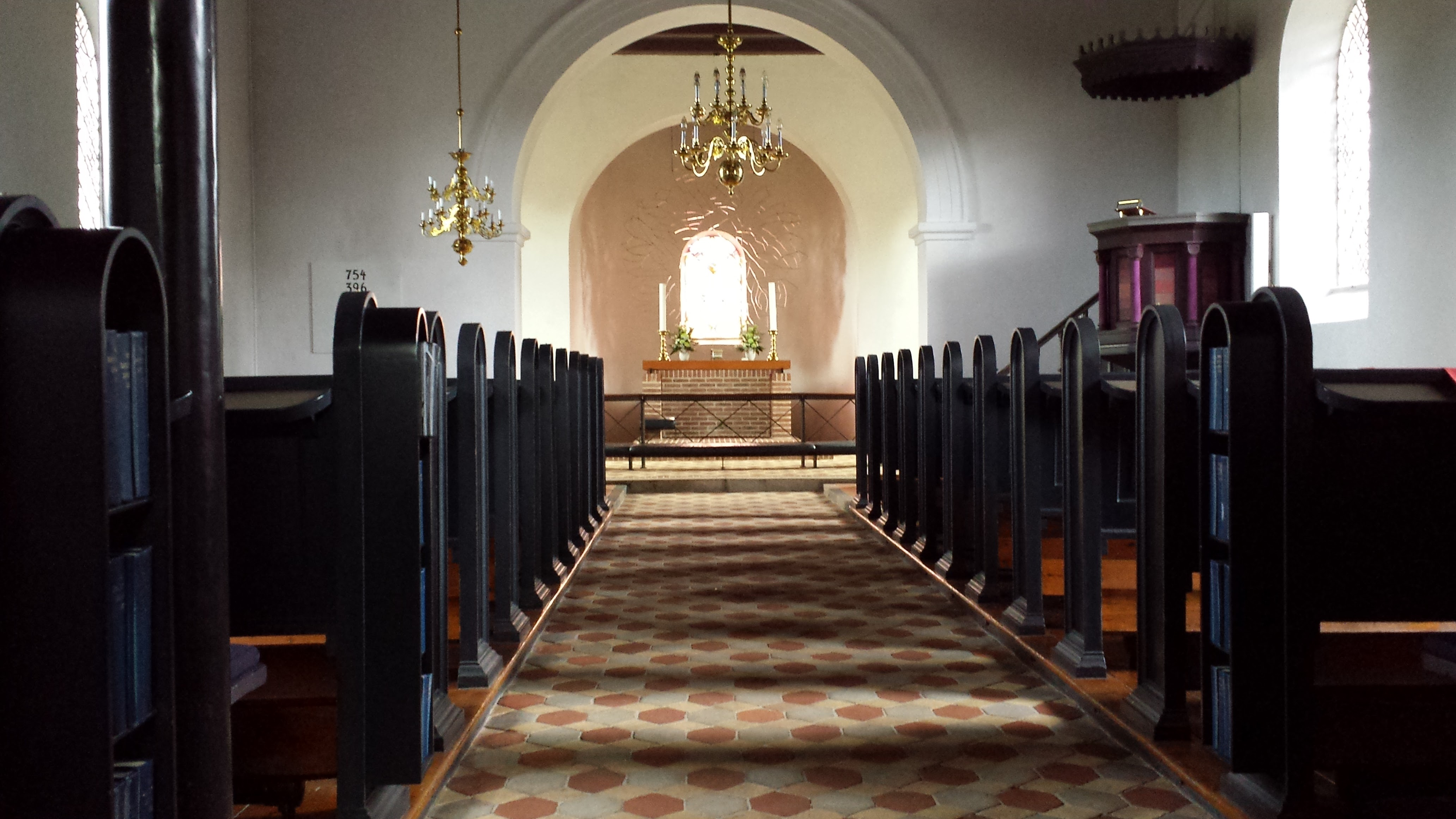

The church is built in round-arch style of red large medieval brick, on a base of granite ashlars from the Old Essenbæk Church. It consists of a nave and chancel in one, internally separated by a round arched triumphal wall, and an apse towards east, and towards west a 26.4 meters high steeple, including an octagonal spire, the sub-room of which it used as church porch. The church's rafter ceiling is covered with lead.

In the church the pulpit, the pews, the framings of the altarpiece, and the foliage in the rafter ceiling were in Romanesque style when the church was consecrated. The altarpiece was a painting by A. Dorph representing Christ and the Pharisees.

=== Furniture and fixtures ===
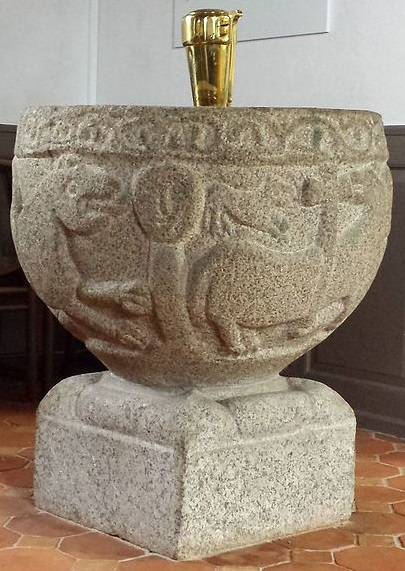
The baptismal font.

The granite baptismal font is from the Early Middle Ages and has Romanesque reliefs depicting heads on stakes, an Agnus Dei, a bird and two lions on the basin. It was used as birdbath in the garden by Gammel Estrup until in 1869 when it was moved to the church. It is probably identical to the baptismal font recorded to have been in the Old Essenbæk Church in 1830.

An organ in four voices is located in the organ loft at the church's western end. The altarpiece has a rose of copper. The altar candlesticks are from c. 1600.

=== Restorations ===
The building was subject to several restoration efforts in the 20th century. Between 1967 and 1968, Mogens Henri Jørgensen repainted the ceiling of the nave, the pulpit, and the pews. Several pieces created by Mogens Henri Jørgensen were installed in the 1980s and 90s. In 1985, glass mosaics created by Jørgensen were installed in the nave. In 1986, more of his glass mosaics were installed in the chancel, along with a stained glass piece in the apse, and the altarpiece rose. In 1993, a stained glass window created by Jørgensen was installed.

== Cemetery and internments ==
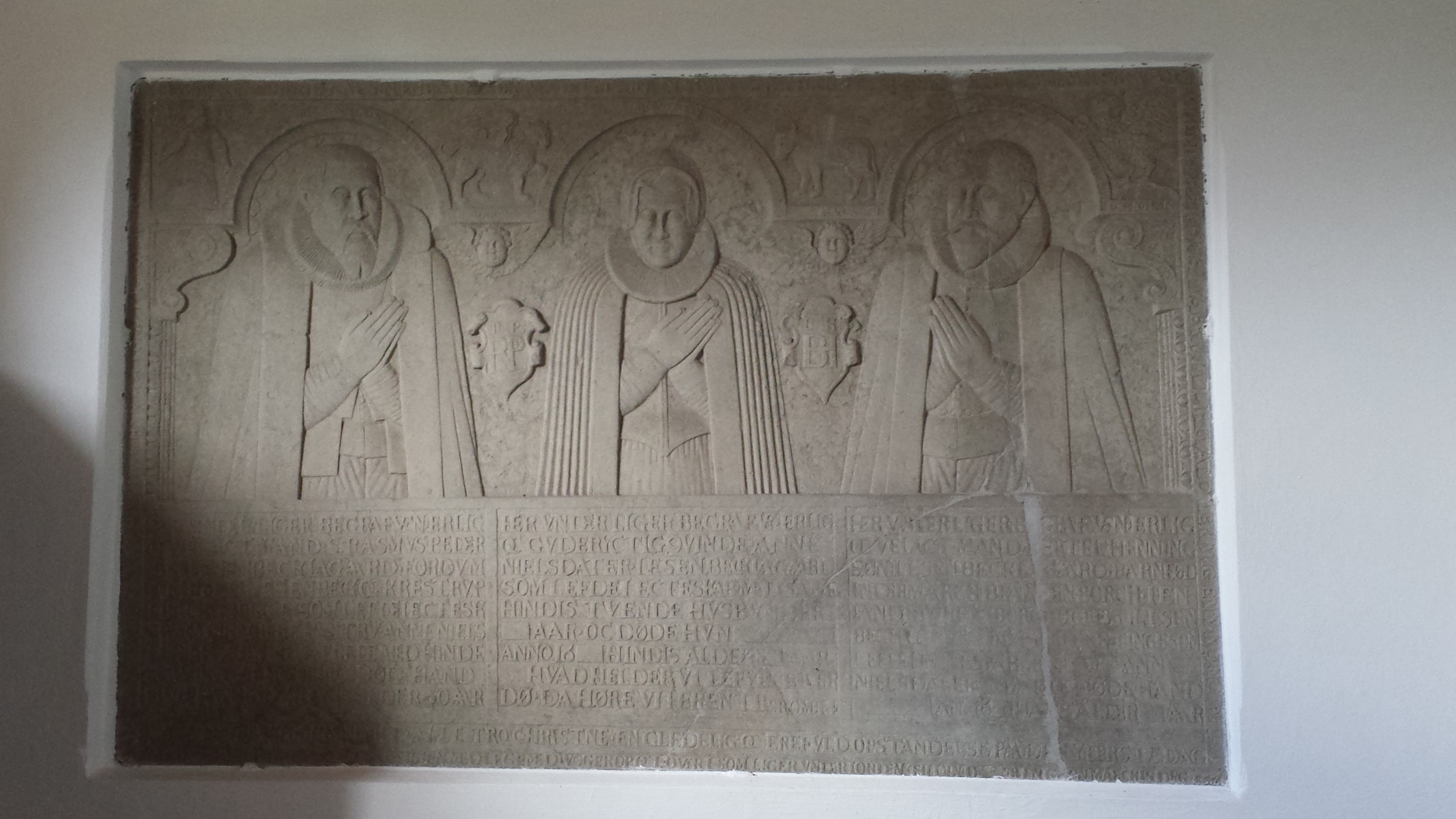
Rasmus Pedersen (left), Anne Nielsdatter (middle), and Bertel Henningsen (right).

Approximately three barrels of land around the church have been landscaped to form a cemetery. The churchyard is surrounded by a wall of shaped stones towards south and west, a stone dike towards north and east, and planted with coniferous trees along the rest of its northern rim. After the new church was constructed in 1869, efforts were made to move the burial sites from the old churchyard to the new layout. Not all of the internments remained stable enough to be moved, and in 1872 only the most recently interred coffins were strong enough to withstand reburial. The new cemetery was then consecrated the morning after their reburial, 28 November 1872, by Bishop Brammer and the parish's priest Alfred Hjalmar Elmqvist. A mortuary was built on the churchyard in 1930.

A large tombstone is installed within the northern wall of the church porch measuring circa 2 meters by 1.5 meters high. It is decorated with a sandstone relief depicting half-figure portraits of Anne Nielsdatter and her husbands Rasmus Pedersen and Bertel Henningsen. Rasmus Pedersen had been the district bailiff of Essenbæk and Kristrup until his death in 1602, when he was succeeded by Henningsen. It is believed that the tombstone may have originally been installed in the floor of the Old Essenbæk Church.

== Priests ==
- Peder Kat, c. 1500
- Magister Laurits, c. 1537
- Christen Thomsen, c. 1570
- Thomas Christensen, 1572–1583
- Rasmus Andersen, 1583–1619
- Jens Hansen Bruun, 1619–1635
- Jens Hansen Trige, 1635–1674
- Hans Lauritsen Carlbye, 1674–1704
- Laurits Hansen Trige, 1704–1724
- Niels Bertelsen Brunow, 1724–1768
- Frederik Pedersen Berg, 1768–1787
- Frederik Bartholin Berg, 1787–1809
- Jorgen C. Bloch Hegelund, 1809–1839
- Christian Dinesen, 1839–1863
- Alfred Hjalmar Elmquist, 1864–1890
- Mads Christian Andersen Østergård, 1890–1921
- Jens Michael Mikkelsen, 1922–1937
- Viggo Anton Sophus Jan Pade, 1938
- Børge Gabriel Barsøe, 1938–1979
- Anna Stovgaard Nicolaisen, 1980–1990
- Inger Lise Gram, 1991
