= Annals of Essenbæk =

Annals with historical notices relating to the years 1020–1323

The Annals of Essenbæk (Latin: Annales Essenbecenses) are annals with historical notices relating to the years 1020–1323, which seem to have been written in the Benedictine Essenbæk Abbey.

== The text ==
=== Characterization ===
Much of the annals’ content is ecclesiastical, which is why the person who wrote them was probably also ecclesiastical, but with great interest and sympathy for the peasants’ conditions. Especially in the latest part of the annals the peasants’ conditions are described as complicated by taxes, storms, diseases and raidings, and the person who wrote the annals clearly favored the Jutish peasants rather than the country’s king in the years 1313-1320.

=== Title ===
In 1773 Langebek gave the annals the title Annales Essenbecenses, with reference to Essenbæk Abbey and the nearby Randers being mentioned in them several times. Also that in the annals there is mentioned several times the castle on Kalø, but not once any of the other castles built by forced labor in 1314, indicates that the annals were written in Djursland, where alone there was a monastery in Essenbæk Parish. Especially persons and places in Jutland - not least bishops in Aarhus - are mentioned in the annals.

=== Dating and sources ===
The Annals of Essenbæk were written no earlier than 1323 (the year that the last notice in the annals relates to), and no later than 1367, when Archbishop Nikles Jonsen (Bild) used them to write his Chronicle of the Archbishops of Lund. The Annals of Essenbæk seem to be based on the Annals of Ryd and the Annals of Lund until about 1262, and the rest of them seem to be original.

== Manuscripts and publications ==
After the Reformation the annals probably went from the last Catholic archbishop Torbern Bille to his brother Klavs Bille, because about 1590 Historiographer Royal Anders Sørensen Vedel owned Alia quaedam chronologica of an old scroll, which Mr. Claus Bilde had, ab anno domini 1027 ad annum domini 1323 (Alia quaedam chronologica aff en gamle rulle, som hr. Claus Bilde haffde, ab anno domini 1027 ad annum domini 1323), and on another partial copy of the annals, which probably around the same time was hand-written for Huitfeldt, there was noted: ”This I have transcribed and noted off a scroll which belonged to Mr. Claus Bilde” (Dette haffuer ieg udskreffuit oc noteret af en rulle som hørde her Claus Bilde thiill). The annals have since disappeared.

=== Latin manuscripts ===
A manuscript, which is probably from around 1500, is the only nearly complete copy of the annals, and is now found in the manuscript collection Codex Bibliotheca Universitas Upsaliensis ex donatione de la Gardie L.

The manuscript was owned by St. Johannis Stephanius, when in the 17th century he hand-wrote a poor copy of it. The Stephanian manuscript is now found in the manuscript collection Codex Bibliotheca Universitas Upsaliensis ex donatione de la Gardie XXV-XXIX, which there are also copies of in Stockholm and Hamburg.

The probably for Huitfeldt hand-written partial copy since came to Danzig, from where Dalin took it to Uppsala in the 18th century. It is now found in the manuscript collection Codex Bibliotheca Universitas Upsaliensis H 112.

In 1664 Vedels partial copy was in the university library, and around 1690 Thomas Broder Bircherod hand-wrote a copy of it. Vedels partial copy burned together with the university library of Copenhagen in 1728. The Bircherodian manuscript from about 1690 does not exist now, but in the 18th century Bircherod and Peder Jensen Lucoppidan each hand-wrote a copy of it. The latest Bircherodian manuscript is now found in the manuscript collection Codex Bibliotheca Regia Hafniensis signatus Ny kongelig Samling 402 in folia, and the Lucoppidan manuscript is now found in the manuscript collection Codex Bibliotheca Regia Hafniensis signatus Ny kongelig Samling 561 in folia.

Two hand-written copies of the Lucoppidan manuscript are now found in the manuscript collection Codex Bibliotheca Regia Hafniensis signatus Ny kongelig Samling 570 in folia.

=== Publications ===
Based on the Lucoppidan manuscript Ernst Joachim von Westphalen in 1743 published the annals in the third volume of Monumenta ininedita rerum Germanicarum praecipue Cimbricarum et Megapolensium.

Langebek owned the two hand-written copies of the Lucoppidan manuscript when in 1773, based on them and a copy of the manuscript which is probably from around 1500, he published the annals in the second volume of Scriptores Rerum Danicarum.

Based on the manuscript which is probably from around 1500, the probably for Huitfeldt hand-written partial copy, the two hand-written copies of the Lucoppidan manuscript, and the copy of the Stephanian manuscript in Hamburg Waitz in 1892 published the annals in the 29th volume of Monumenta Germaniae Historica.

Based on the manuscript which is probably from around 1500, the probably for Huitfeldt hand-written partial copy, the latest Bircherodian manuscript and the Lucoppidan manuscript Ellen Jørgensen in 1920 published the annals in Annales Danici medii ævi.

In 1980 Erik Kroman published the annals in Danmarks middelalderlige annaler.
