= Essenbæk Abbey =

Benedictine monastery in Denmark

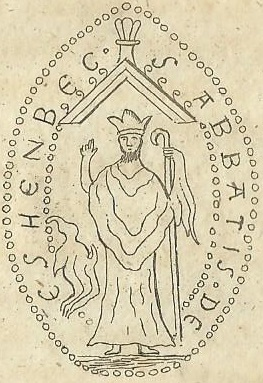
- Seal of Abbot Jonas of Essenbæk Abbey, and probably also of the abbey itself, from 1490, representing the abbot and to his right a praying figure in monastic cowl.

- Location within Denmark
- Interactive map of Essenbæk Abbey

Monastery information
- Order: Benedictine
- Established: Ca. 1140
- Disestablished: 1548
- Diocese: Aarhus

People
- Founder: Stig Tokesen “Hvide”

Site
- Location: Randers Municipality, Central Denmark Region, Denmark
- Coordinates: 56.451917°N 10.136028°E
- Visible remains: none
- Public access: no

Essenbæk Abbey (Danish: Essenbæk Kloster) was a Benedictine monastery located in Essenbæk Parish eight kilometers east of Randers and 1.7 kilometers north of Assentoft, Denmark.

== History ==
=== Early history ===
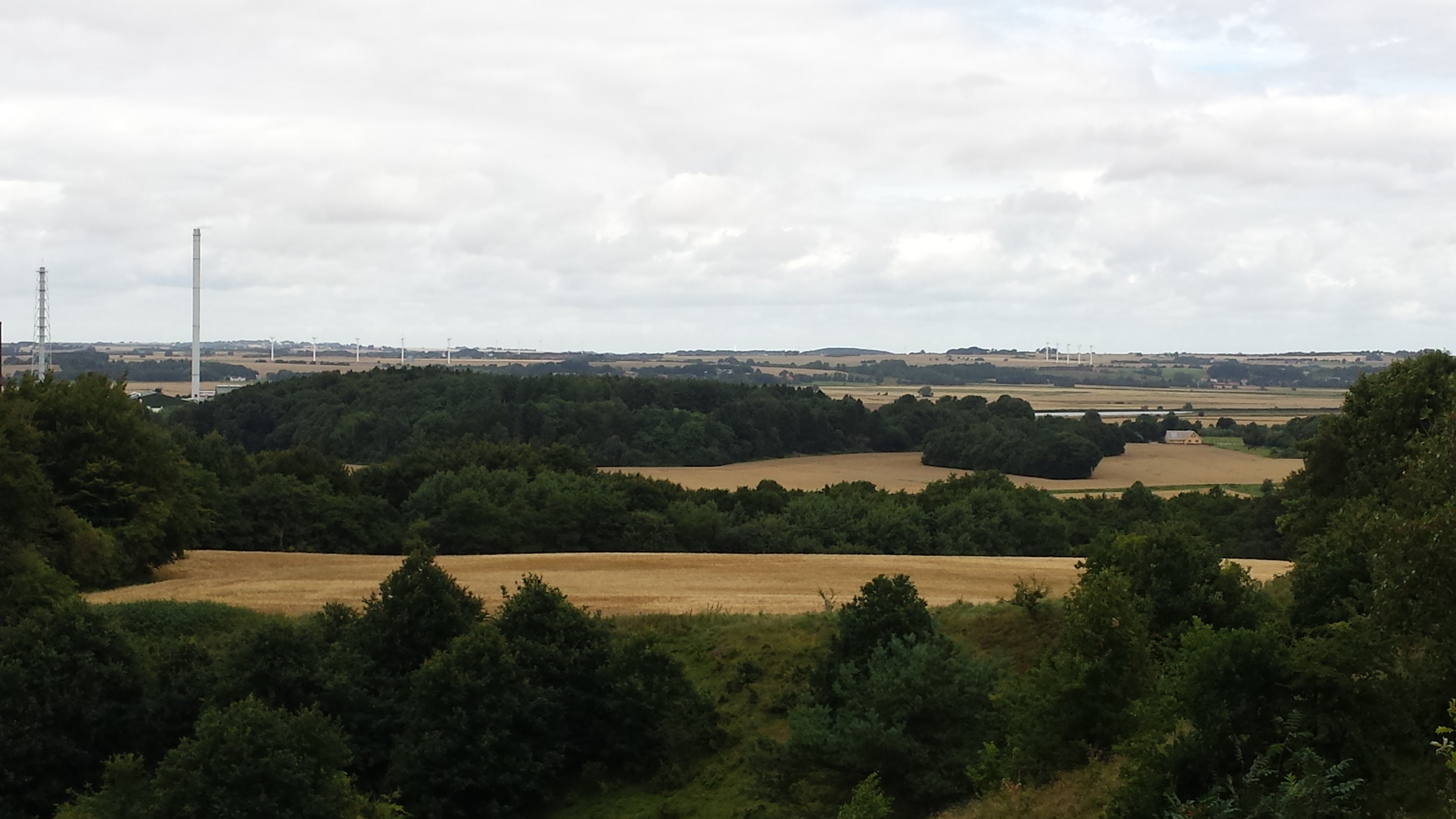
View from Lausdal (bottom) and across Mondal and the meadows behind to Holmen and the site of the abbey (the yellow house on the right)

The monastery was established by Stig Tokesen (Hvide), who was killed in 1151, perhaps as a Cluniac double monastery in or near Randers. In 1179 it was changed, as the nuns apparently transferred to the Abbey of Our Lady in Randers, and was moved the next year to the east of the drumlin of Holmen in Essenbæk Parish, from which it took its name. It is said that the founder and his wife Margrethe were buried in the monastery church.

The Annals of Essenbæk, with historical notices regarding the years 1020–1323, seem to have been written in Essenbæk Abbey, which was the only monastery in Djursland until the 20th century.

In 1330 Stig Andersen Hvide gave the abbey a farm in Egens Parish for burial places in the monastic church for himself and his wife Tove Andersdatter, and in 1369 was buried there, as in due course was his wife.

On 28 September 1403 the monastery was referred to as “Saint Lawrence’s monastery in Æssumbæk of the Order of St Benedict”, and some of the monastery's income was from pilgrims who on Saint John's Eve went on pilgrimage to the well of Saint Lawrence (Sankt Laurseskilde) below Assentoft.

In 1431 the pope ordered the monks to let the bishop of Viborg examine the qualifications of the abbot they had elected, before the bishop ordained him.

Much wealth and property was donated to the monastery, particularly by the Hvide clan, so that in time it owned all the lands in Essenbæk Parish, almost all those in Virring Parish, and additional estates in the parishes of Albæk, Bregnet, Dalbyover, Egens, Egå, Fausing, Fløjstrup, Gimming, Gjesing, Glesborg, Harridslev, Homå, Hornslet, Hørning, Kastbjerg, Lime, Mariager, Mejlby, Mørke, Rimsø, Skødstrup, Tøstrup, Udbyneder, Voldby, Ødum, and Årslev, as well as in the hundreds of Hjelmslev, Houlbjerg, and Middelsom. The monastery's assets in Sønderhald Hundred included the birk or market place of Essenbæk, with a legal jurisdiction independent of the hundred, from no later than 9 August 1475.

For six farms the monastery in 1516 bought itself free from the obligation of billeting, and in 1518 the king owed the monastery 38 weights (0.56 kilograms) of silver and 25 Rhenish guilders. In 1525 it was assessed to raise from its estate two horsemen for domestic service, and two horsemen as well as two riflemen for foreign service.

Despite the abbey's wealth the king declared on 5 September 1529 that the courtier Hans Emmiksen was elected by the monks as its custodian until his death, rather than the infirm abbot, since “the monastery’s estate is daily won from it, and the brothers for a long time have not gotten their necessities according to their rule’s exercise”. At the same time Emmiksen was named as vassal there by the king, who probably prompted the election rather than the monks themselves. In the monastery's home farm alone there were then 20 oxen with two ploughs, 27 large and small steers, 42 cows, 26 heifers and young cattle, 100 sheep, 53 pigs, eight old nags, and 13 young nags and yearlings (year-old colts and fillies).

=== Modern history ===
A monk from the abbey was beheaded in 1537 for rape, and in 1540 the monastery was confiscated by the king. Around that time it was mortgaged to Axel Juul for 3,000 dollars – a sum that in 1546 had been increased to 4,000 dollars. The monks left the monastery early, and on 3 April 1548 the king decided that it should be a part of Queen Dorothea’s jointure. He therefore paid the mortgage, but later she received Sønderborg and Nordborg instead as her jointure, and in 1550 the monastery was incorporated into Dronningborg Fief. Hans Stygge, who was a vassal there, had the bodies of Stig Tokesen Hvide and his wife Margrethe moved to Dronningborg Castle, and Bjørn Andersen, who owned Stenalt, had the bodies of Stig Andersen Hvide and his wife Tove Andersdatter moved to Ørsted Church.

In 1558 Chancellery Secretary Jakob Reventlow registered nearly 100 letters from Essenbæk Abbey in Silkeborg's archive. A few of them are now in the Danish National Archives, but the others are since lost.

It is not known when the monastery was demolished, but in 1593 the local judicial district bailiff Rasmus Pedersen resided in Essenbæk Home Farm on the west of Holmen, which may imply that the monastery was probably uninhabitable by then. The church bell was taken to Old Essenbæk Church. On 22 August 1661 the monastery was acquired among other property from the king by Hans Friis, and that estate then included a chapel which was possibly a remnant of the monastery's church. On 20 December 1687 the judicial district was incorporated into Sønderhald Hundred.

The teacher Karl Hansen wrote in 1832 that there were no remains of the monastery, but in 1894 a piece of solid wall was found on the west of the mound known as Kirkegaarden (the Churchyard) on Holmen, which was then being surveyed for the National Museum of Denmark. The teacher J. V. Nissen led an excavation in 1898 for the National Museum of Denmark, during which among other things remains of the monastery church were unearthed, and the National Museum of Denmark therefore had the site listed for preservation of the site. Kirkegaarden's owner began however in 1918 to remove stones from the site, since the preservation had not been written into his title deed or mortgage records, so in 1925 the architect I. P. Hjersing mapped what remained before that too was removed. The same year the owner found a stone-lined well there, and many skeletons around it.

== Known abbots ==
- Peder - 1345
- Lars – 3 April 1396
- Jens – 28 September 1403
- Mikkel - 1421, 17 July 1423, 4 September 1424
- Laurids - 1438
- Søren - 1463
- Per Niels – 1 February 1479
- Jonas - 1490
- Jens Thommesen/Thomæsøn - 1516, 1518, 5 September 1529

== Location and structure ==
Holmen is mostly sandy soil between bog and meadow south of Randers Fjord. Kirkegaarden in 1894 measured about two alen (1.26 meter) high, about 37 alen (23.23 meters) from north to south, and about 50 alen (31.39 meters) from east to west. The excavation in 1898 unearthed a foundation of unworked boulders between one and two feet high (0.31 to 0.63 meter) and four and a half feet thick (1.41 meter), to a depth of 130 centimeters below the surface of the earth, which in several places was laid around driven down oak piles. Down to 85 centimeters below the surface of the earth on top of the foundation there were the remains of a wall core of smaller fieldstones and brick fragments in a great deal of lime, which was covered with large medieval bricks. When the monastery was demolished, the large medieval bricks were first removed, after which the wall core was toppled outward. Until then parts of the toppled wall were up to 7 alen (4.39 meters) high, but on top there were probably courses entirely of brick.

The foundation was of the north-eastern corner of a building, which ended flat to the east, and inside extended 30 feet (9.1 meters) in either direction. Nearby remains indicated that the foundation continued towards the north from the building's north-west, which is why the building was thought to be the church's chancel.

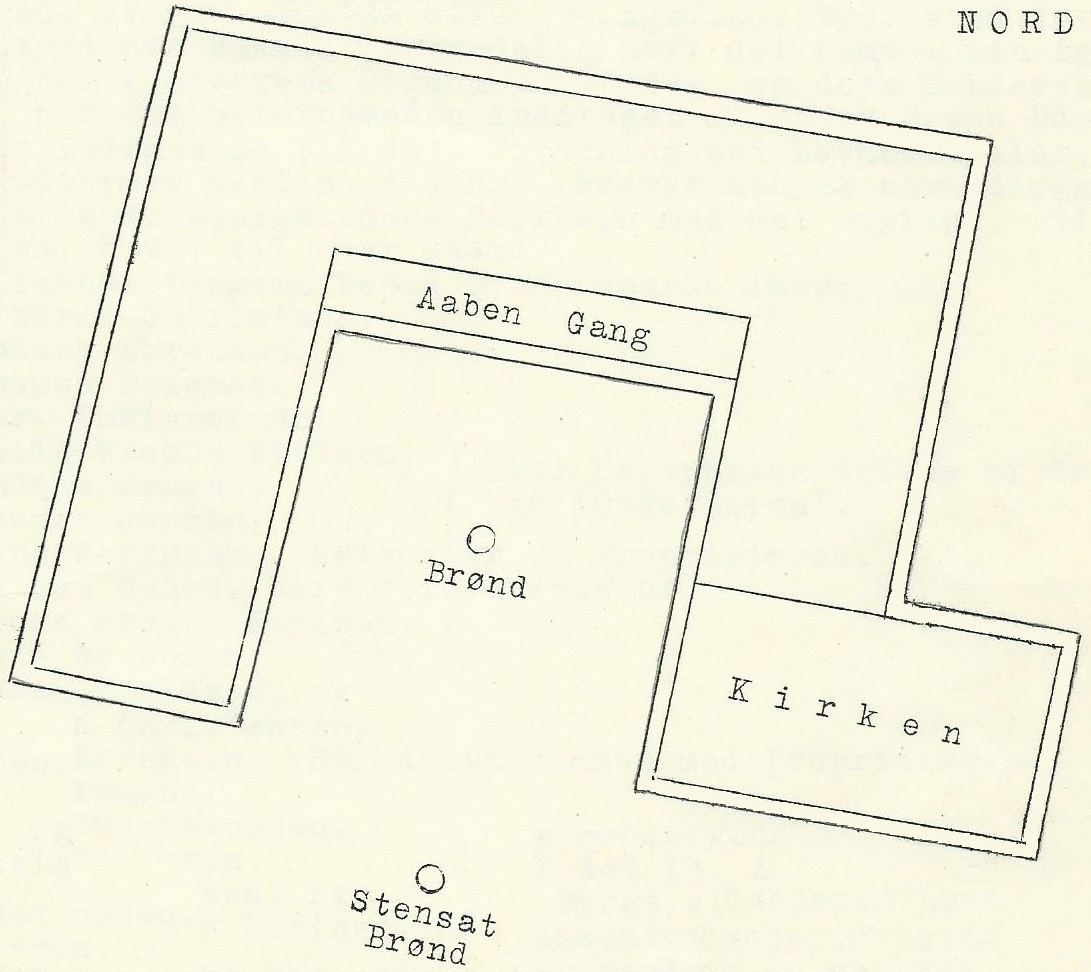
The monastery's probable floor plan

The mapping in 1925 indicated that the foundation north of the church chancel was of the monastery's east wing, 49 meters long and 10 meters wide, which was divided into four rooms, of which the sacristy was apparently nearest the church. The mapping further indicated that the east wing was built to adjoin the monastery's north wing, in which there was probably an open cloister about two and a half alen (1.57 meters wide). The monastery's west wing was indicated, and between the wings was a courtyard that was open towards the south, with a stone-lined well in the middle surrounded by buried skeletons. Directly in front of the courtyard was another stone-lined well, this one with stairs. Altogether the monastery measured about 57 meters from north to south and 47 meters from east to west.

In 1529 the monastery contained a kitchen, priest's kitchen, scullery, basement, a food loft and a granary, besides probably rooms for labourers and guests, and the monastery owned a home farm with a flour house.

On a patch of heavy boulders to the north stood a watermill, and curved round the east of the monastery was a water-filled ditch. To the south-west was its fish pond.

From the monastery a road led across the bog to a flat space of about 40 square meters at the bottom of the Lausdal gully, where at the Well of Saint Lawrence there was a stone wall, and where in 1850 was found a 10 alen (6.28 meters) long tree pump. At the beginning of the 18th century skeletons in walled graves vaulted at the top were found here, which consequently was the monastery's graveyard, and again late in the 18th century as well as in 1849.

Through the meadow the road was paved with smaller cobblestones and large rim stones, but from there wound as a sunken lane up through the heather hills at Assentoft. A stone-lined road also led through the meadow from the monastery to its loading port by Gudenåen.

On the clay hill Mondal south of the bog, and east of Lausdal, remains of large medieval bricks indicate that the bricks for the monastery and its brick-lined graves were produced in a brickyard there.

=== Anna Krabbe’s Columns ===
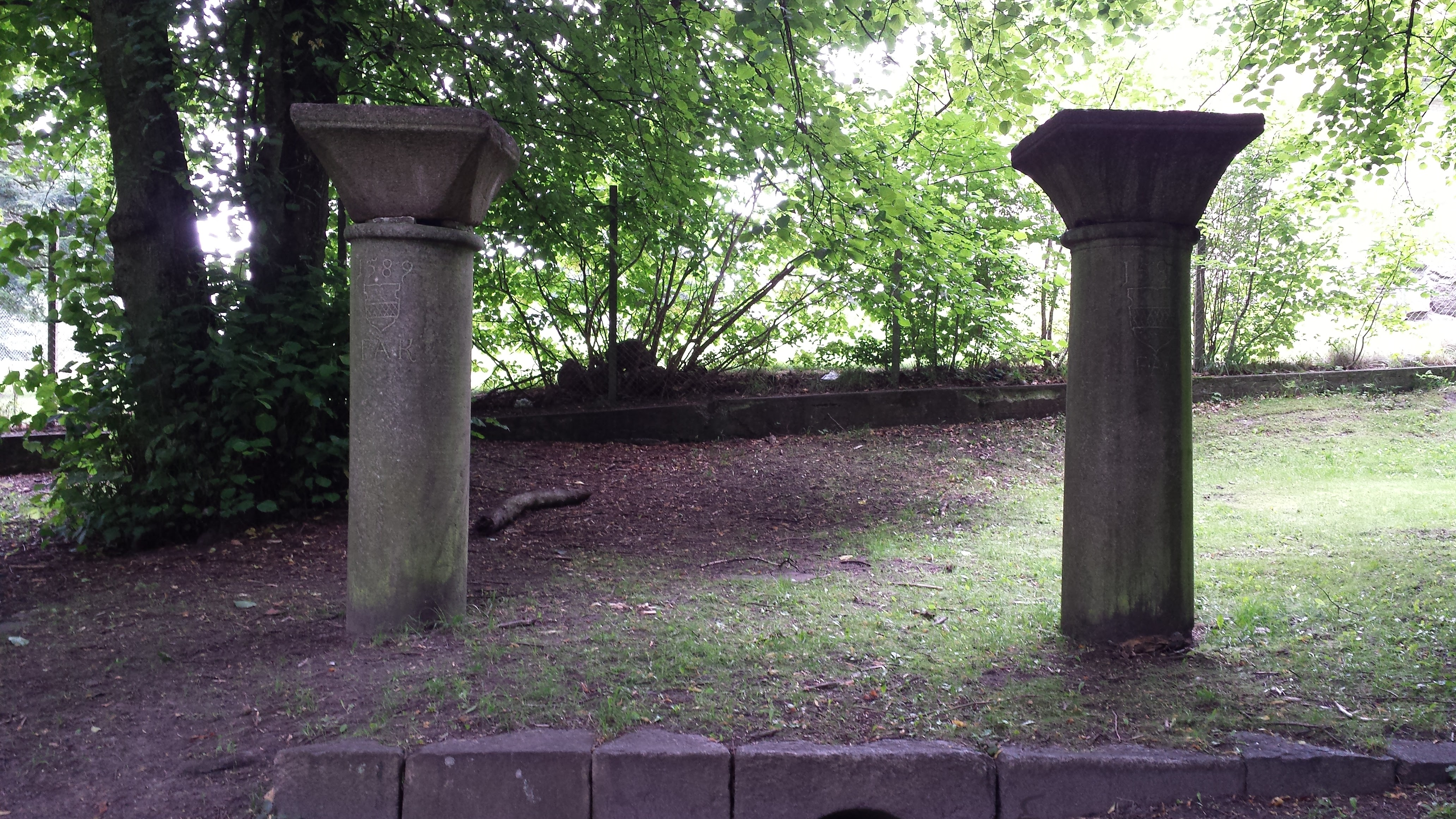
Anna Krabbe's Columns in Tøjhushaven in Randers

Two granite columns three and a half meters high from the park at Stenalt were taken in 1804 across the frozen Randers Fjord to Dronningborg. There a local farmer used one as a roller, but in 1870 the columns were bought by Randers Municipality, which in 1872 had them erected in Tøjhushaven in Randers.

Carved on the columns is the date "1589", a coat of arms and the initials "FAK". The coat of arms belonged to the family of lady (fruen) Anna Krabbe, and the date probably refers to the year they were erected at Stenalt, which she then owned. Anna Krabbe collected antiquities, and is said to have had the columns brought there from Essenbæk Abbey.

Probably the columns were quarried in the fourth century in Egypt, and thereafter stood in a Roman building. How they came to Essenbæk is unknown, but they were probably incorporated in Essenbæk Abbey when it was built, with new capitals from Denmark added.
