= Annals of Lund =

Historical Danish manuscripts

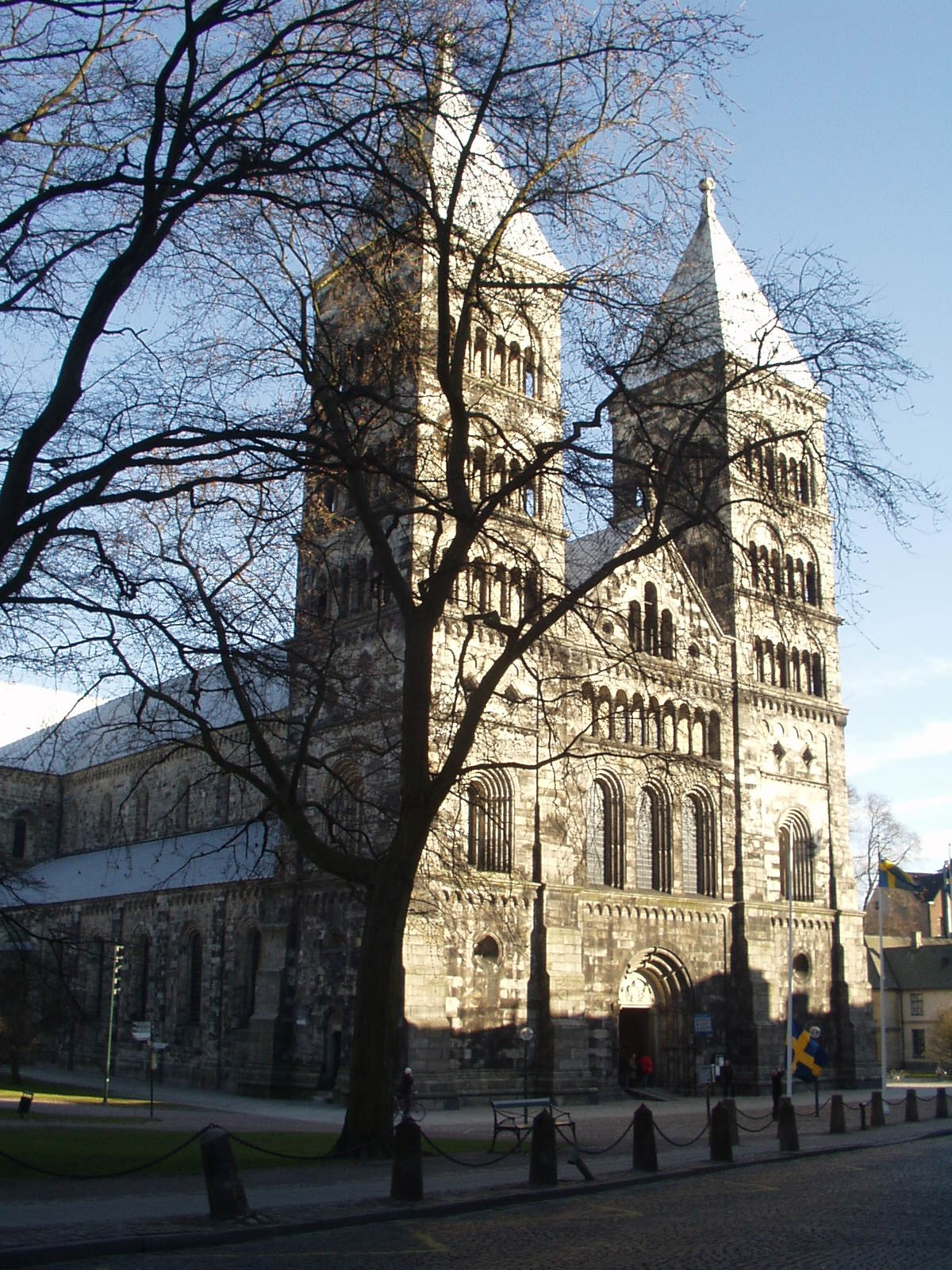
The Cathedral of Lund

The Annals of Lund (Latin: Annales Lundenses) is a Latin set of annals written in Lund around 1250–1307. Several manuscript copies have survived to the modern day. The text is composed of two parts: the first part is based on earlier works, including the Chronicon Lethrense, and discusses events from antiquity to 1256; the second part includes events from every year until 1307. This portion is unique to the Annals of Lund and primarily deals with Danish politics. The topics include the Norwegian King Erik’s offensive in Denmark and Erik Menved's marriage with Ingeborg of Sweden in 1296. Additionally, the Battle of Gestilren in Sweden in 1210 and the 1256 destruction of Refshaleborg fort on Lolland are described.

There are three surviving copies of the Annals of Lund. One is found at the Erfurt Library in Germany and the other two are part of the Arnamagnæan Manuscript Collection in the Royal Library in Copenhagen.

== See also ==
- List of Danish chronicles

== Eiditions ==
- Annales Lundenses, in: G. Waitz (ed.), Ex rerum germanicum danicarum ex saec. XII. et XIII., Hanover 1892, p. 185-209 (MGH SS, 29)
- Ellen Jørgensen (ed.), Annales danici medii ævi. Editionem nouam curauit, Copenhagen 1920, p. 44-62, 73-129
