= Hilda Sehested =

Danish composer (1858–1936)

Hilda Sehested (27 April 1858 – 15 April 1936) was a Danish composer.

== Biography ==
Hilda Sehested was born in Funen, Denmark, of parents Niels Frederik Bernhard Sehested (1813–82), an archaeologist, and Charlotte Christine Linde (1819–94). She studied music with C. F. E. Horneman in Copenhagen and later with Louise Aglaé Massart (1827-1887) in Paris. She studied organ with Ludvig Birkedal-Barfod and composition with Orla Rosenhoff, and began composing at the age of 30.

Sehested's mother died in 1894, and she moved to Copenhagen to live with her sister Thyra. She became engaged to archaeologist and museum director Henry Petersen there, but he died before the wedding. Shocked by his death, Sehested took a job as a nurse for a while and then as a church organist, and eventually returned to composing. She died in Copenhagen.

== Works ==
Sehested wrote a number of songs, compositions for instruments and orchestra and one opera. Selected works include:

- Fantasy Pieces, 1891
- Sonata for Pianoforte, 1896
- Intermezzi for Piano Trio, sonata, 1904
- Suite für Cornet in B und Klavier, 1905
- Songs with Piano, 1907
- Agnete and the Merman opera, 1914
- Miniatures for Orchestra, 1915
- Rhapsody, 1915
- Quartet in G for strings
- Morceau pathétique for trombone and orchestra, 1923
- Four Fantasy Pieces for flute and piano, 1927

Her compositions have been recorded and issued on CD, including;

- Romantic Piano Works by Danish Women Composers Cathrine Penderup, Nanna Liebmann, Hilda Sehested, Benna Moe (2009) Danacord Records
