= Randers =

City in Denmark

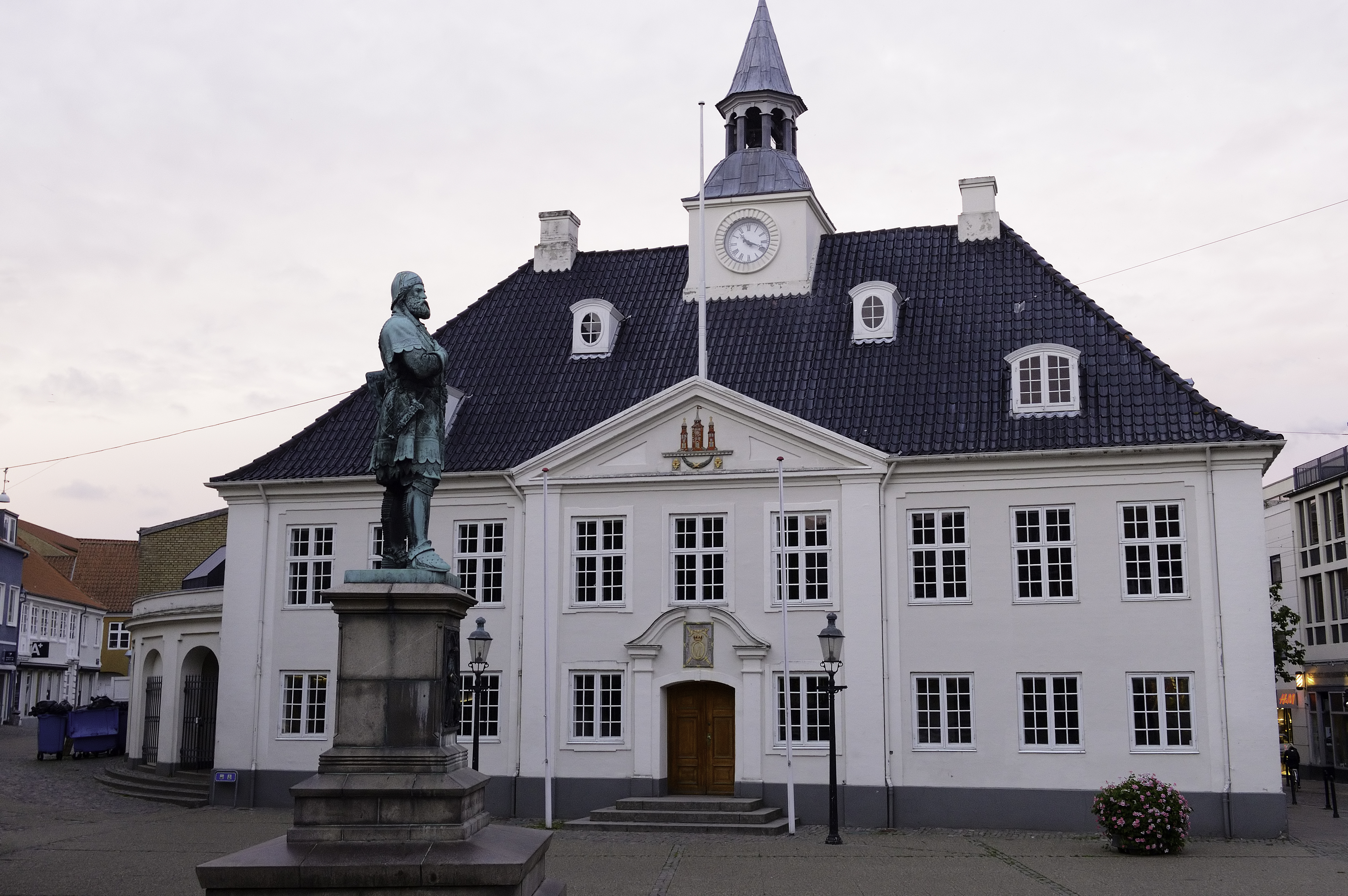
- The old Town Hall on the square in Randers with a statue of Niels Ebbesen in the foreground.

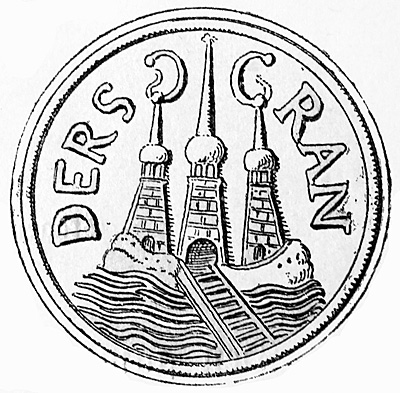
- Seal Coat of arms

- Randers Denmark Randers (Central Denmark Region)
- Coordinates: 56.457°N 10.039°E
- Country: Denmark
- Region: Central Denmark Region
- Municipality: Randers

Government
  - Mayor: Rosa Lykke Yde

Area
  - Urban: 32.8 km^{2} (12.7 sq mi)
- Elevation: 56 m (184 ft)

Population (2026)
  - Urban: 64,764
  - Urban density: 1,970/km^{2} (5,110/sq mi)
  - Gender: 31,778 males and 32,986 females
- Demonym: Randrusianer
- Time zone: UTC+1 (Central Europe Time)
  - Summer (DST): UTC+2
- Postal code: 8900, 8920, 8930, 8940, 8960
- Area code: (+45) 8
- Website: randers.dk

Randers (Danish: [ˈʁɑnɐs]) is a city in northeast of the Jutland peninsula. It is Denmark's 7th largest city, with a population of 64,764 (as of 1 January 2026). Randers is the main town and administration center of the Randers Municipality. By road it is 38.5 kilometres (23.9 mi) north of Aarhus, 43.8 kilometres (27.2 mi) east of Viborg, and 224 kilometres (139 mi) northwest of Copenhagen.

Randers became a thriving market town in medieval times, and many of its 15th-century half-timbered houses remain today, as does St Martin's Church, also from that period. Trade by sea was facilitated through the Gudenå River, entering Randers Fjord. During industrialization, Randers quickly became one of the most important industrial towns in the country, but it saw itself outpaced by the cities of Aarhus and Aalborg at the beginning of the 20th century. Most of the larger historic industries in Randers are gone today. From 1970, the population saw a decline from a peak of 58,500 citizens, until a stabilization in the 1990s occurred, followed by a modest rise since then.

The main tourist attraction is Randers Tropical Zoo thanks to its artificial rainforest, the largest in Northern Europe, its 350 varieties of plant and over 175 species of animals. The city's football team, Randers FC, play their homes games at the AutoC Park Randers, and are in Denmark's first league, the Superligaen. The town is also home to Randers rugby union club and Jutland RLFC, a rugby league team, as well as Randers Cimbria, a Basketligaen team that took 2nd place in the 2013–2014 season.

== Etymology ==
The oldest forms of the town's name appear on coins minted from the times of Canute the Holy (1080–86) until those of Svend Grathe (1146–57). The coins bear the names Ranrosia, Ransias, Radrusia, Rand and Randrusia. Ancient written records include the Latin Randrusium (Saxo Grammaticus, c. 1200), Icelandic Randrosi (Snorri Sturluson's Heimskringla, 1230), and Rondrus, Randrøs (Valdemar's Census Book, 1231). Other early forms provide Randersborg and Randershusen. The name appears to stem from Rand (hillside) and Aros (river mouth) and probably means "town on the hillside by the river mouth". The modern form Randers first came into use at the end of the 17th century.

== History ==
=== Early history ===
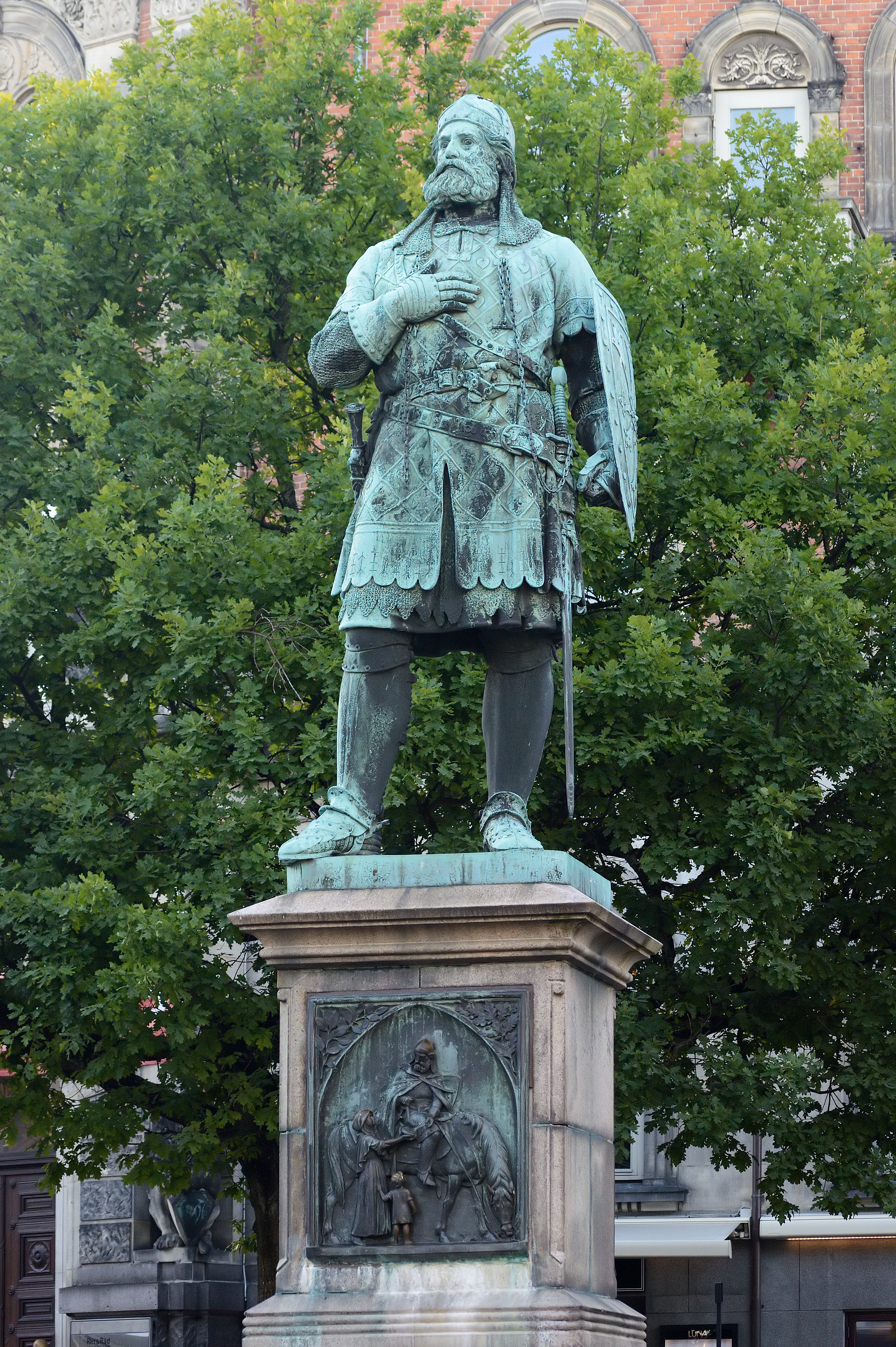
Niels Ebbesen statue in front of the old Town Hall in Randers

Randers was formally established around the 12th century, but traces of activity date back to Viking times. Canute IV of Denmark (ca. 1043–1086), also known as Canute the Saint and Canute the Holy, and as patron saint of Denmark, minted coins in the town. He had plans to attack England and its ruler, William the Conqueror, He assembled people in this town. A chronicle written at Essenbæk Abbey tells of a fire that ravaged the city. The city was destroyed and rebuilt three times in the 13th century. In 1246, it was burned down by Abel of Denmark's troops during the civil uprising against Eric IV of Denmark. On a street in the town center is the house where, according to legend, Danish nobleman and national hero Niels Ebbesen killed Count Richard (Gerhard) III of Holstein on 1 April 1340, during the Kingless Times, when the entire country was pledged to German counts. This action led to further insurrection against the Germans. Ebbesen died in a large battle at Skanderborg Castle in December 1340. A statue to Ebbesen stands in front of Randers's Town Hall today.

When King Valdemar IV of Denmark (Valdemar Atterdag) tried to assemble a government in 1350 after the mortgaging to the Holsteiners, the town was further reinforced with protection, and was often named as Randershus ("Randers Fortress"). This fortification was captured by dissatisfied nobility in 1357. In 1359 Valdemar attacked the captured city with the strength of all of his forces. During medieval times the city prospered as a market town.

=== Middle Ages ===
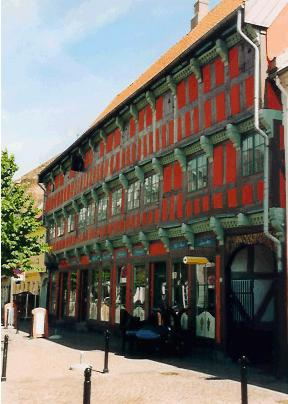
The half-timbered merchant's house Niels Ebbesen's Gaard from 1643. Now a restaurant.

Randers was granted privileges as a market town in 1302, creating a significant amount of trade. It prospered in the 15th and 16th centuries trading both nationally and overseas thanks to its harbour and cargo shipping maintained by competent craftsmen. Salmon fishing also contributed to the local economy.

The town was fortified through much of the Middle Ages. Today, however, the only sign of defensive walls is their existence in street names. These streets follow a circular path, presumably following the location of the historic walls. Street names include Østervold ("Eastern Defense Wall"), Nørreport ("Northern Gate"), Vestervold ("Western Defense Wall"), and Lille Voldgade ("Little Defense Wall Street").

In 1534, a farmers' uprising tried to storm the town unsuccessfully; it was part of wider regional peasant unrest affecting the Jutland region the same year, leading to the death of some 2000 by the sword in Aalborg alone. Massive moats were set up around the town under the rule of King Christian III (1536–1559). The town was already known for its glove-making in the Middle Ages but at the beginning of the 18th century the industry really prospered. During the second half of the 17th century, the town suffered not only from the Swedish wars but experienced the plague and extensive fires. From the mid-17th century, the economy began to thrive once more, the harbour was extended bringing an increase in shipping. By the end of the 18th century, it had become Jutland's largest town with 4,500 inhabitants.

During its peak there were almost 170 merchants' estates in the area, and a sizeable trade fleet that sailed around the world. Some of these old half-timbered estates and manor homes can still be seen in the town. The region around Randers is referred to as Crown Jutland (Kronjylland) and its inhabitants as Crown Jutlanders (Kronjyder), probably due to its large estates owned by the monarchy. It was Denmark's poets who first started to use the term Kronjyde in the mid-18th century. N. F. S. Grundtvig (1783–1872) and Hans Christian Andersen (1805–1875), and especially Nobel Prize laureate Henrik Pontoppidan (1857–1943), used the term. The population in 1880 was 13,457.

=== Industrialisation and modern times ===
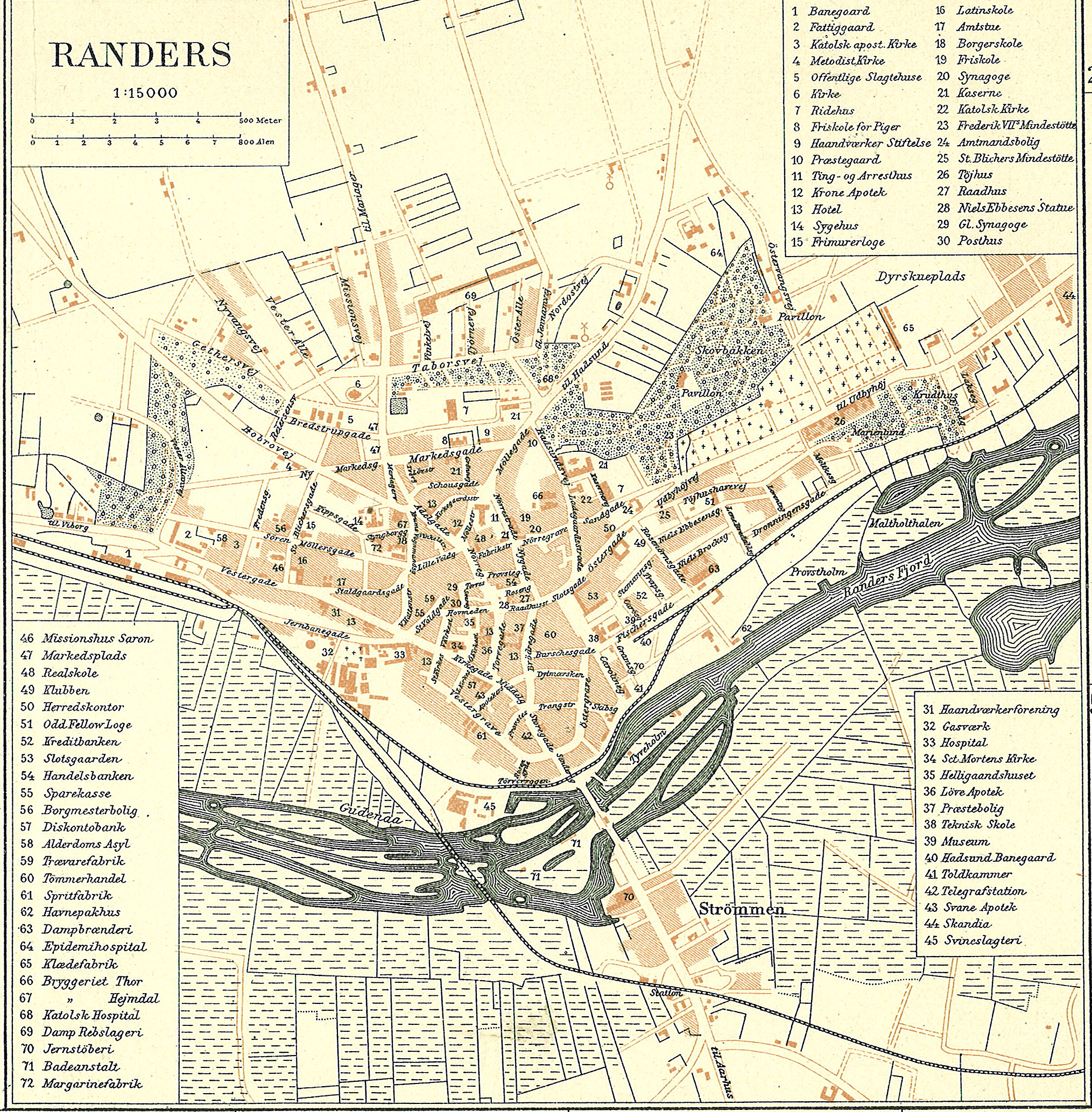
Map of Randers (1900).

During the industrialisation, Randers became a centre for the developing agricultural industry and a number of manufacturing businesses and heavy machinery factories also emerged. According to "The Popular Encyclopedia; or, Conversations Lexicon", Blackie & Son (c. 1890), Randers contained at that time an arsenal, a classical school with six professors, and had several industrial establishments, including manufacturers of gloves, for which the town had long been famous. Randers was also known for salmon, rope, and pretty women. The harbour near the town had only 7 1/2 feet (2.3 m) of water, but there was a good shipyard; and at some distance below, at the mouth of the fjord, there was another harbour with 9 to 10 feet (2.7 to 3.0 m) water, and roads with good anchorage in 4 to 5 fathoms (24 to 30 ft; 7 to 9 m).

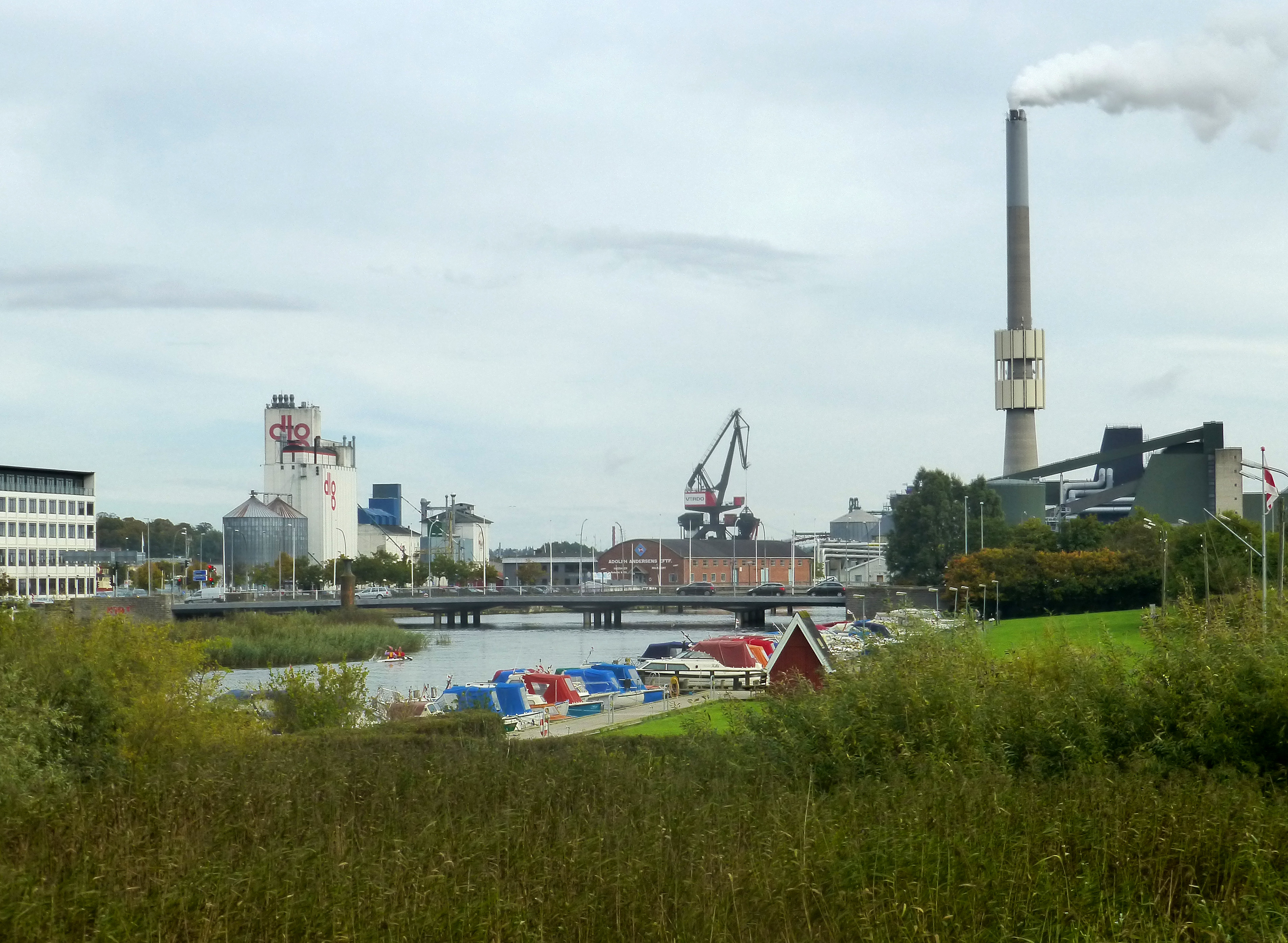
The industrialisation has imprinted itself on the city.

From the later half of the 1800s, Randers grew in several directions, and a large industrial area emerged at the harbour. In particular the crafts and industry sector grew and Randers became one of the most important industrial towns in Denmark. Trade and seafaring continued to be major sectors of the local economy and the harbour was expanded and improved several times during this era. With the opening of the first railway line to Aarhus in 1862, the barge-transports on the Guden River declined dramatically. This however paved the way for a booming railway manufacturing industry. Even though the population of Randers grew in these years, it was also the time, when the town was outpaced by Aarhus and Aalborg.

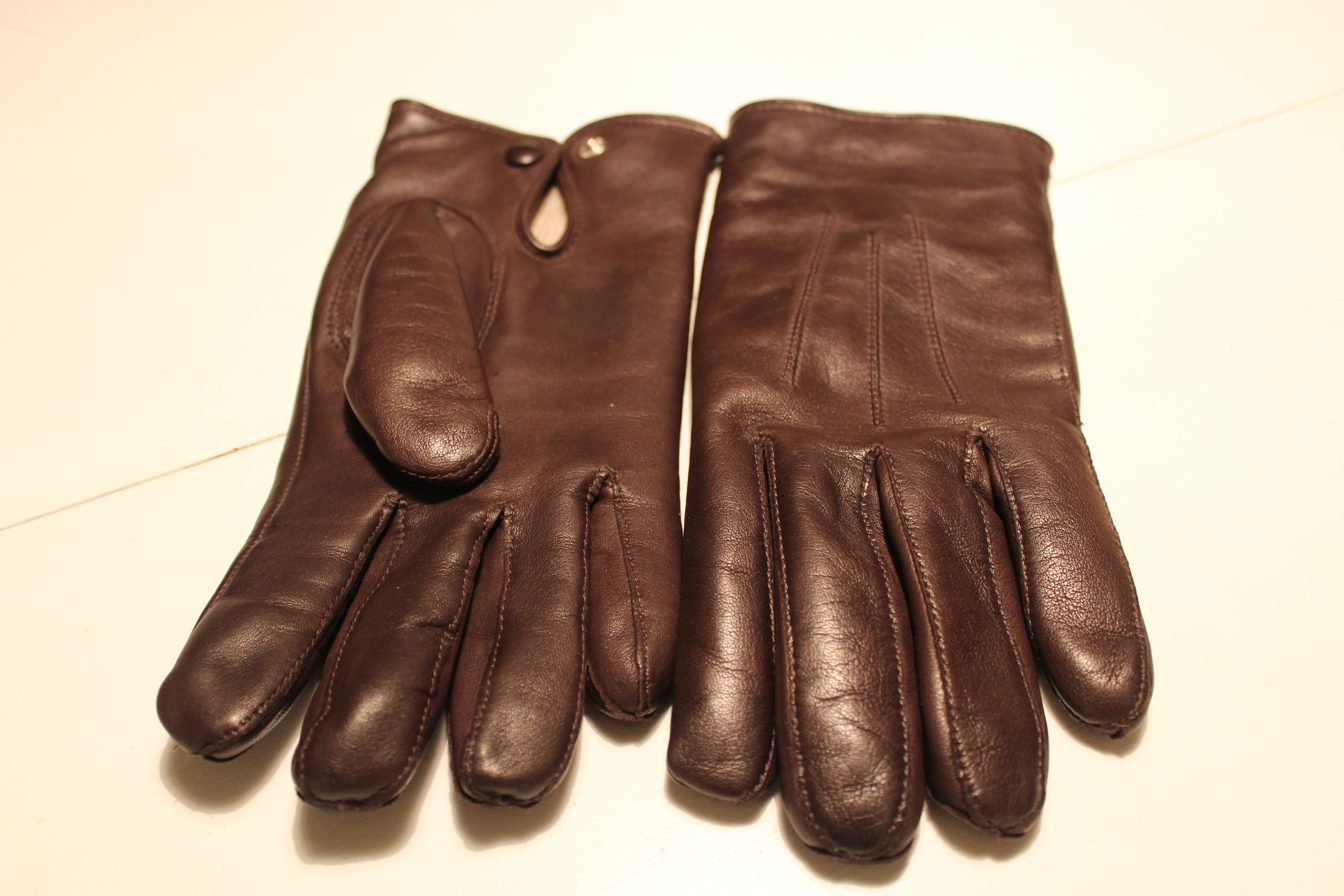
Randers has been known for its glove production for centuries.

The glove factory of Randers Handskefabrik was established in 1811, and is considered among the oldest glove factories in the World. The manufacturing of gloves in Randers has been traced back to the 1200s, in the 1600s it was the primary occupation here and from the 1700s the gloves became known abroad, with exports to Sweden, Germany, Russia, France and England. After some decades with declining productions, the factory was built, industrialising and boosting the productions, guided by the knowledge of Parisian glovemaker Charles Mattat. Shops in London and New York were added to the company in 1892. In 1927, Randers Handsker were acquired by the Danish Vejrum family, who still owns and runs the company today.

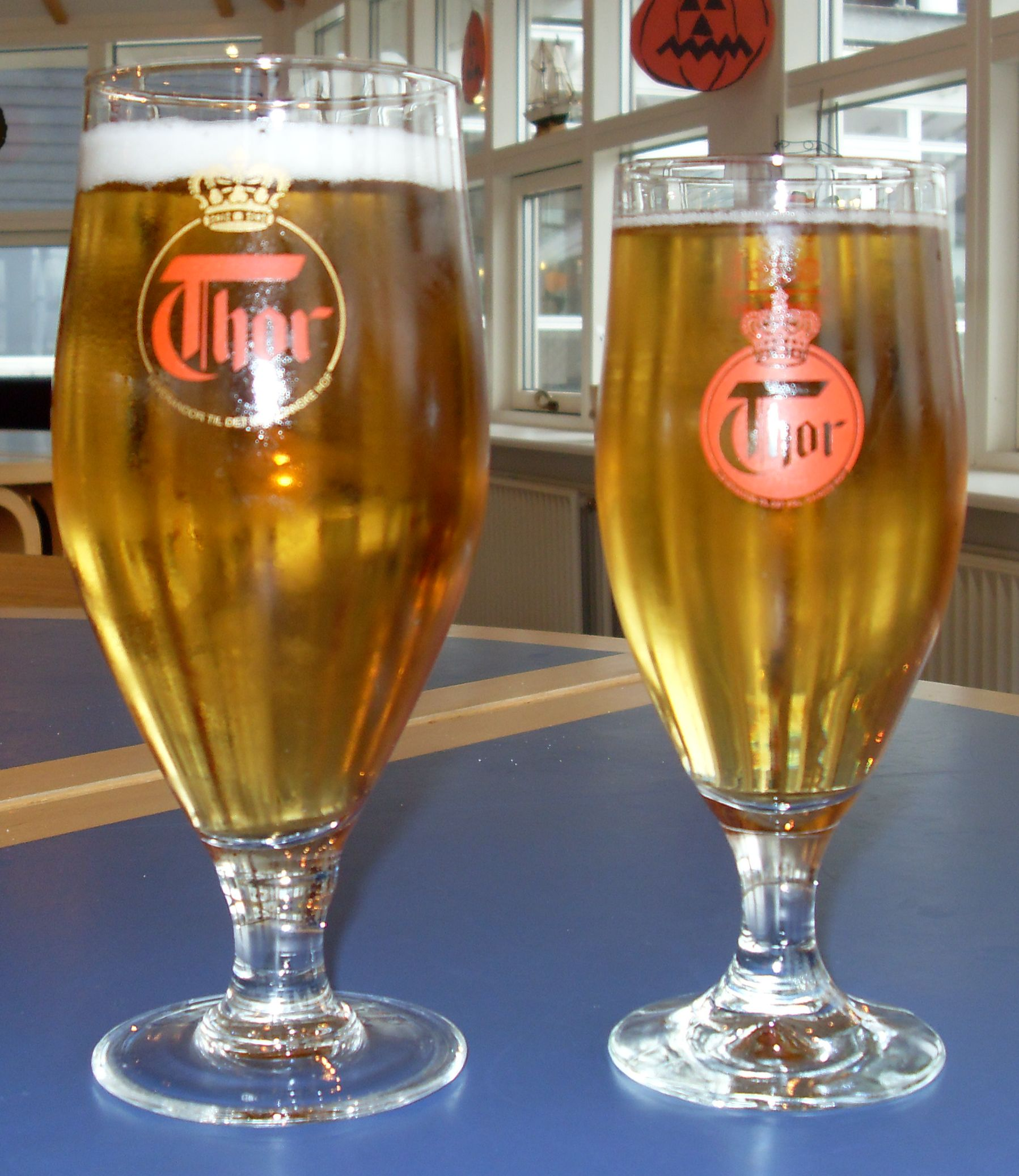
Thor, a beer brand associated with the city of Randers.

The larger emerging industries included the Thor breweries, founded in 1856 by the businessman Christian Emil Synnestvedt, but built in 1850 by the Swedish entrepreneur Johan Peter Lindahl. The Thor breweries was an important industry and employer in Randers for many years and the beer brand of Thor is still associated with the city. The breweries closed in 2003, but Thor is still being produced, now by Royal Unibrew in Odense, and there is a sales-office in Randers promoting the brand. The old factory buildings at Thorsgade is considered important for the history of beer brewing in Denmark and some of them are now listed by the Danish Cultural Agency. A 36-metre tall white concrete silo, was for many years a landmark of the town, but it was demolished in 2008 to give way for modern building projects.

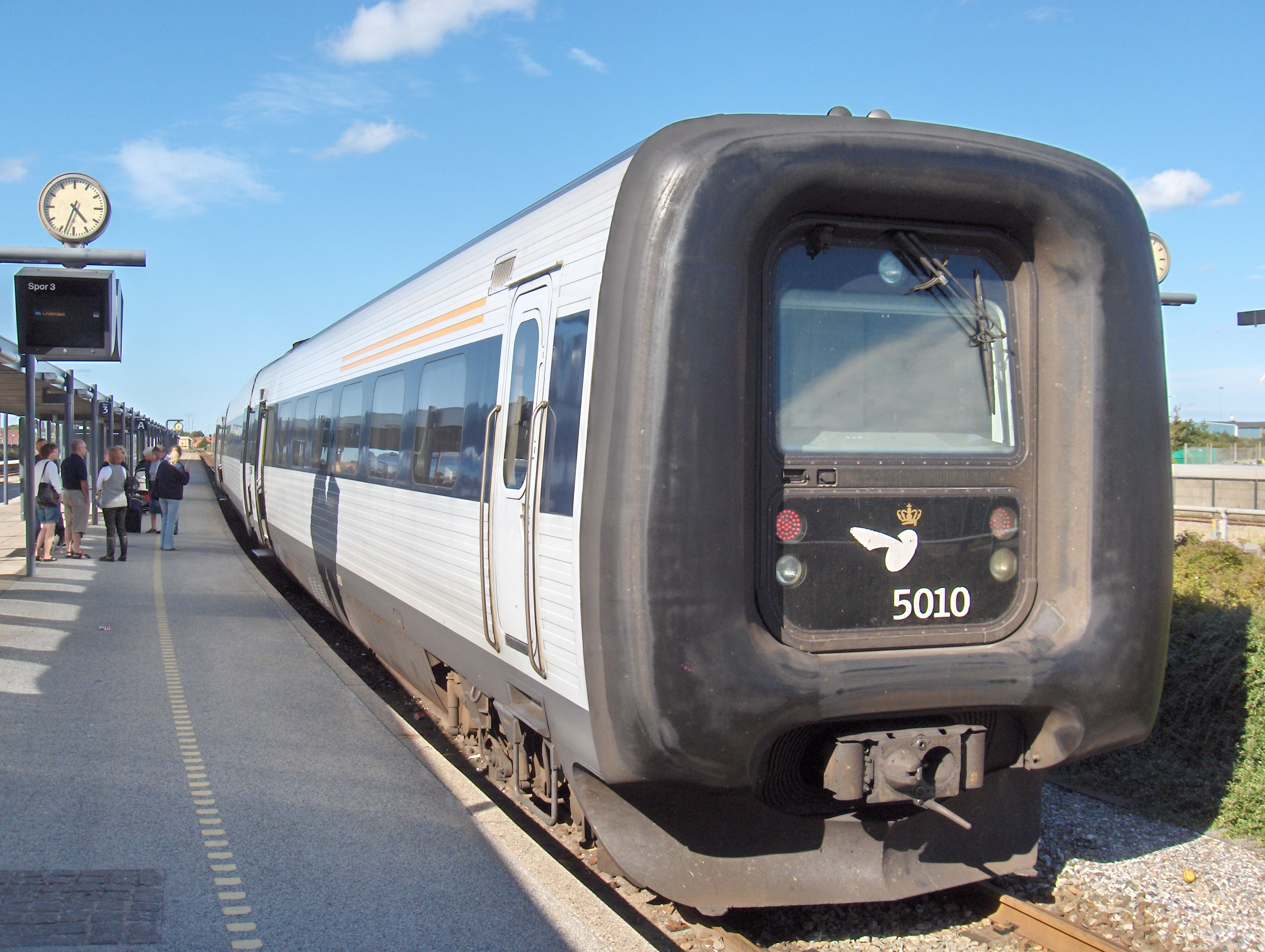
The IC3 trains were produced at Scandia in Randers in the late 1980s.

In 1861, the train factory of Hvide Mølle was founded in the neighbourhood of Dronningborg by the British consortium Peto, Brassey and Betts. It became a large employer in Randers, at one time the largest, and changed its name to Scandia in 1876, a name and brand that became well known abroad. Scandia produced the IC3 intercity trains for DSB, the Danish State Railway. In 2001 the company was bought by Canadian Bombardier, but the factories were put up for sale in 2015 due to lack of orders.

In 1894, the machine factory of Dronningborg Maskinfabrik was founded in Dronningborg, also known as Dronningborg Industries abroad. The factory produced agricultural machines and in 1958 combine harvesters became part of the production line. From 1984 they produced for the British Massey Ferguson. The company was bought by American AGCO in 1997 and the production was trimmed.

In 1935 a regional hospital was founded in Randers, located in the neighbourhood of Dronningborg.

Randers became an important military site in modern times. The large barrack of Randers Kaserne was built in 1940 and all in all the town and surrounding countryside could encamp from 10,000 to 15,000 men, in a position which could not easily be overrun.

== Geography ==
=== Setting ===
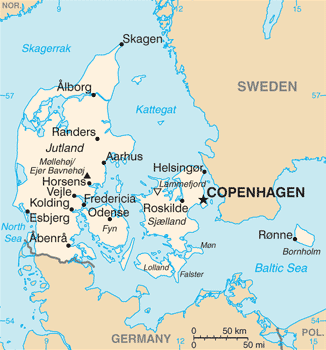
Location of Randers in Denmark

Randers, and Randers municipality, lies within the geographical region of Kronjylland (Crown Jutland), a name that possibly refers to the many royal possessions in this area, in particular in former times. By road it is 38.5 kilometres (23.9 mi) north of Aarhus, 43.8 kilometres (27.2 mi) east of Viborg, 80.2 kilometres (49.8 mi) south of Aalborg and 224 kilometres (139 mi) northwest of Copenhagen.

=== Geographical features ===
The city is Denmark's only natural river harbour, situated on the banks of the Guden River (Gudenå), about 6 miles (10 km) above the rivers mouth in Randers Fjord. There are several wooded areas in Randers, including Skovbakken, to the northeast of the centre, the smaller Tøjhushaven to the immediate southeast of this, north of the harbour area, and Ladegårdsbækken, a narrow stretch of woodland to the east of the hospital. Dronningborg Skov, in the hamlet of Dronningborg, is located in the northeastern suburbs of the city, and Henriettelund lies in the southwestern suburb of Vorup.

=== Subdivisions ===
Suburbs of Randers include Dronningborg, Helsted, Kristrup, Neder Hornbæk, Over Hornbæk, Paderup, Romalt, and Vorup. The wider municipality covers an area of 748.21 square kilometres (288.89 sq mi). Settlements include Albæk, Asferg, Assentoft, Dalbyover, Fårup, Gassum, Gimming, Gjerlev, Hald, Harridslev, Haslund, Havndal, Helstrup, Hørning, Langå, Lem, Linde, Mejlby, Mellerup, Råsted, Spentrup, Stevnstrup, Sønderbæk, Tvede, Tånum, Udbyhøj Vasehuse, Uggelhuse, Værum, Ålum, Øster Bjerregrav, and Øster Tørslev.

=== Climate ===
Climate in this area has mild differences between highs and lows, and there is adequate rainfall year-round. The Köppen Climate Classification subtype for this climate is "Cfb" (Marine West Coast Climate/Oceanic climate).

== Demographics ==
Randers has a population of 64,057 (as of 1 January 2023). From 1970, the population saw a decline from a peak of 58,500 citizens, until a stabilization in the 1990s occurred, followed by a modest rise since then.

== Economy ==
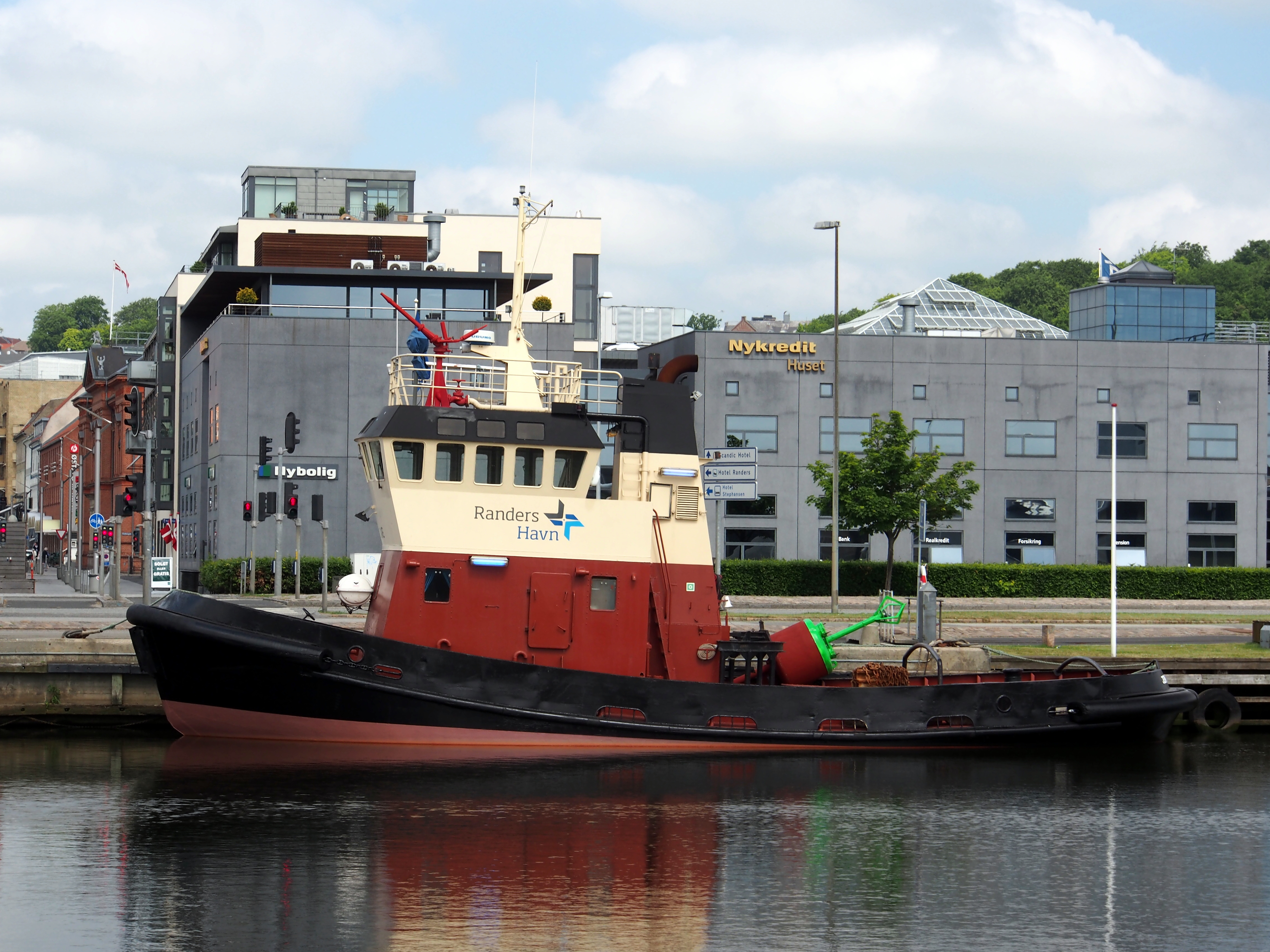
Randers harbour, an important facility for the economic growth of the city.

A vast agricultural countryside, and a central hub for transportation by land, river and sea, helped make Randers a dynamic center for production, trade and commerce. Barges on the Guden River and the Northern River (Nørreå) formerly transported a large number of goods to and from Randers, from the central region of Jutland and in particular the towns of Silkeborg and Viborg. From the harbour in Randers, goods were and are exported and imported.

Most of the former large employers has down-scaled productions, outsourced, moved or closed in recent decades. This includes the military installations and the Thor breweries closed in 2003. The large agricultural co-operative of Dansk Landbrugs Grovvareselskab (DLG) still has facilities and silos in Randers and the regional hospital is also in operation and now employs around 1,800 people. Randers Handsker has a shop and its headquarters in Randers, but the production has been outsourced abroad. In the late stages of the industrialisation, the industry of the city had managed to diversify and a number of high-tech companies are now based in and around Randers, although most are small-scale employers locally.

As jobs in production industries has declined and with the global economic crisis of 2008, the unemployment rate has risen in Randers, especially for young uneducated people. 17.7% of young people under 30, was on public support in 2013, with 8.8% of young people under 30 being uneducated and on the municipal support against poverty (Danish: Kontanthjælp). Many have been unemployed for extensive periods, making it more difficult to regain employment. Occupation in the public sector and the private service sector has compensated a little bit for the job loss, with a slight employment rise in modern times, and the employment rate in Randers is overall regarded as stabilized since 2010. In 2013, 33% of the employed commute every day to other municipalities. Likewise 26% of the jobs in Randers are employed by commuters from other municipalities.

The main economic and employment sectors today in Randers are, administration and service, crafts and industry, trade and transport; in that order. Some of the former industrial areas have been or are being redeveloped into housing, stores, offices and public institutions. The Danish meat company Danish Crown has its head office in Randers.

== Culture ==
Since 1977, Randers Ugen has been a cultural festival in Randers every year in the middle of August. The festival lasts nine days and presents a number concerts, art exhibitions, theatre and sports events such as the traditional boat regatta of Fjordregatta and the running event of Fjordløbet.

Rander's old former power plant, known as Værket (The Plant), was decommissioned in 1982 and is now a centre for theatre and music since 1990. There is a large concert hall here, several scenes and also an art cinema by the name of KG Bio.

GAIA Museum Outsider Art is a small alternative art school and museum since 2002. The museum collects and exhibits art made by outsiders from around the world, defining outsiders as people living outside the social normalcy or are outside the art establishment. The school has around twenty students.

Danish Design Museum is situated close to the rainforest zoo and exhibits Danish design-icons. The exhibits includes both older and modern industrial designs like Bang & Olufsen, Kay Bojesen, Poul Henningsen, various lamp designs, ceramics and other categories.

Memphis Mansion is a museum dedicated to Elvis Presley paraphernalia, inaugurated in 2011. The mansion is a copy of Elvis's Graceland and the project has been initiated and financed by the president of the Elvis Presley fanclub in Denmark. Memphis Mansion is located in southern outskirts of Randers, and had over 130.000 visitors in 2015.

Also of note is the historic craftsmans museum of Kejsergården and the innovative multi-ethnic business and cultural centre of Underværket.

== Notable landmarks ==
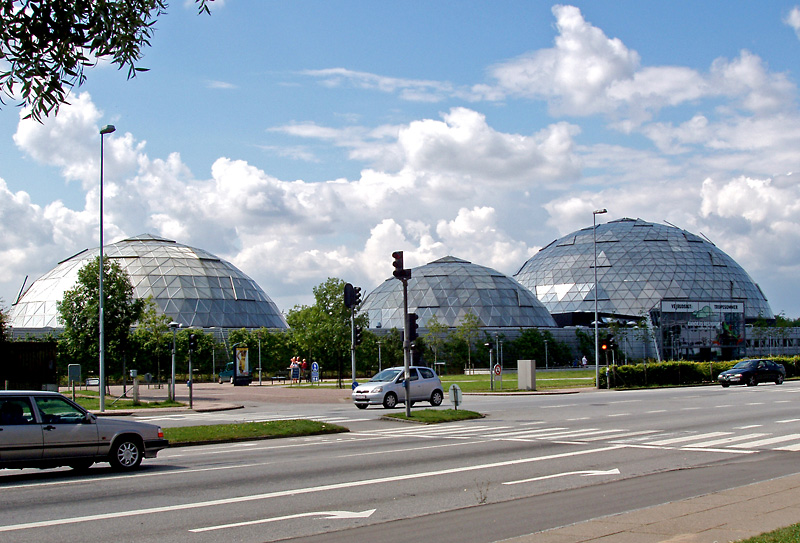
Randers Tropical Zoo.

Randers Tropical Zoo, Randers's top tourist attraction, is Northern Europe's largest artificial rainforest, featuring about 350 different kinds of plants and more than 175 species of animals, many of which roam free under its three geodesic domes: the South America Dome, the Africa Dome, and the Asia Dome. The zoo is Randers's top tourist attraction. Additionally there are areas called "The Snake Garden" and the Aquarium. The organisation has been involved in the restoration of local wetlands in Vorup Meadow (Vorup Enge), a large nearby area on the southwestern side of the Guden River.

=== Churches and houses ===
St Martin's Church dates to the 15th century. Helligåndshuset ("House of the Holy Spirit") once part of a monastery also dates to the 15th century as does Paaskesønnernes, a three-storey red brick house. Clausholm Castle, located some 12 kilometres (7.5 mi) southeast of Randers is one of Denmark's finest Baroque buildings.

=== Kulturhuset and other buildings ===
Kulturhuset is a notable landmark building in Randers. It was designed by architect Flemming Lassen in the modernist style and built in 1961. The name translates simply as "The House of Culture" and it holds a number of important public cultural institutions. The most notable are the Randers Art Museum, the Museum of Cultural History and Randers Library. Randers Library consists of a main library in Kulturhuset, two local libraries within the municipality, one mobile library and a local library in Langå. The headquarters of the Museum Østjylland, focussing on various aspects of the regional local history is also situated in the building. The museum administers a few museum buildings in Randers and exhibitions in both Grenå and Ebeltoft.

Randers Storcenter is a landmark shopping mall in the southern parts on Randers next to E45. The mall comprise 58 speciality stores, a Kvickly supermarket, playgrounds, lounges and baby rooms.

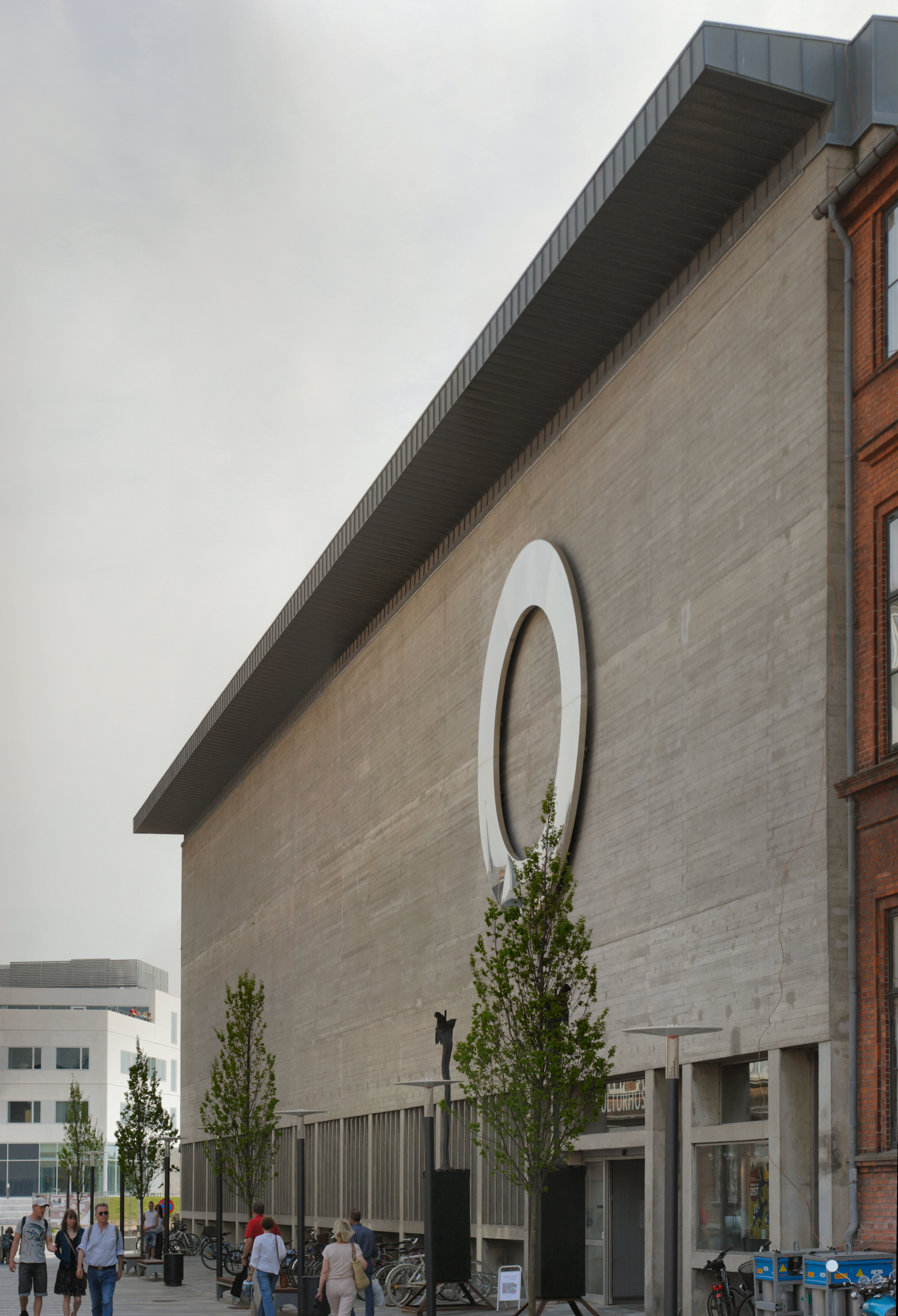
Kulturhuset, which includes Randers Museum of Art, the cultural history Museum Østjylland and Randers Library.

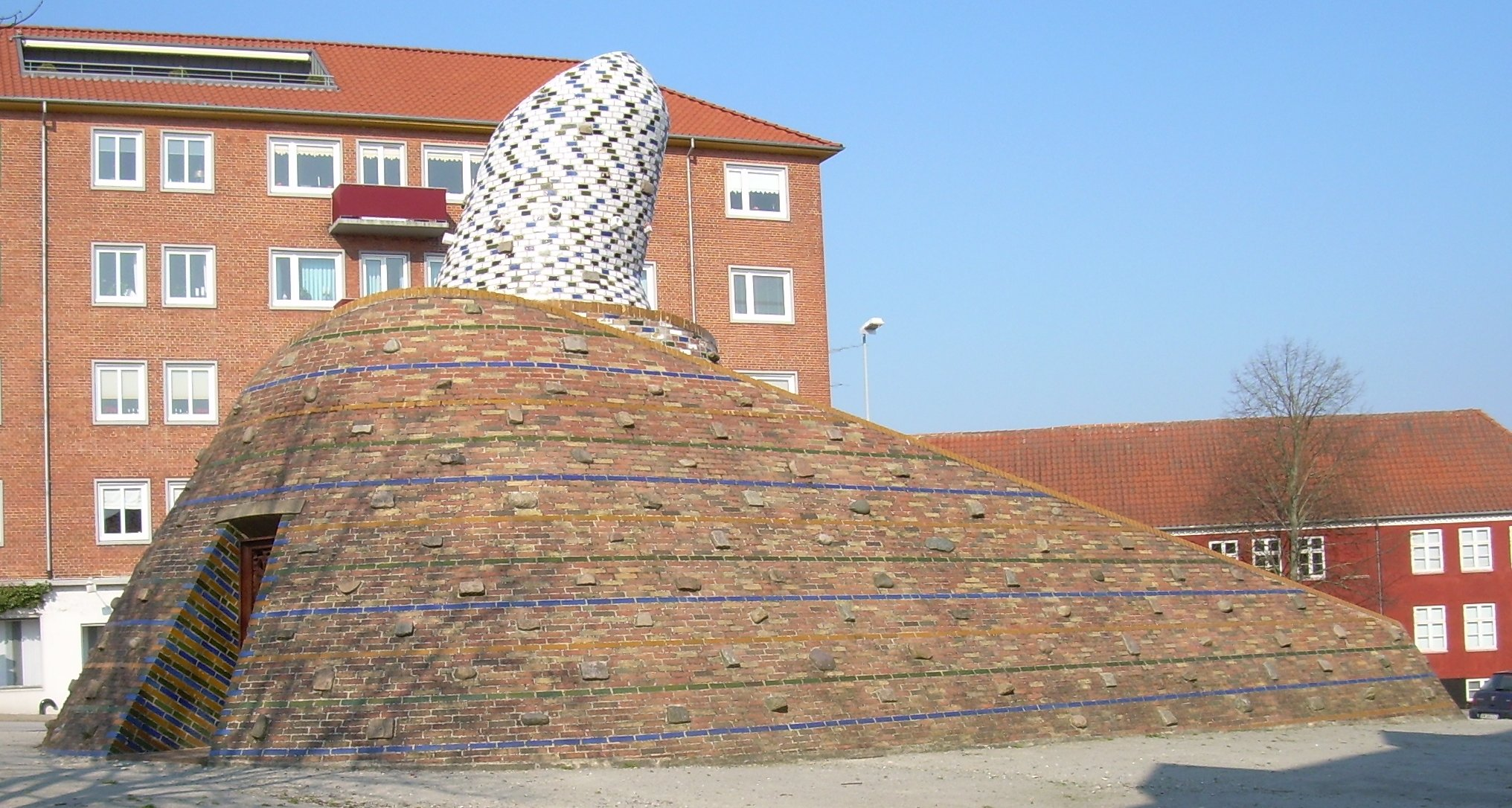
Kapel til Nutiden (Chapel for Present Times), a large ceramic sculpture (Bjørn Nørgaard 1994). One of several modern artworks around the city.

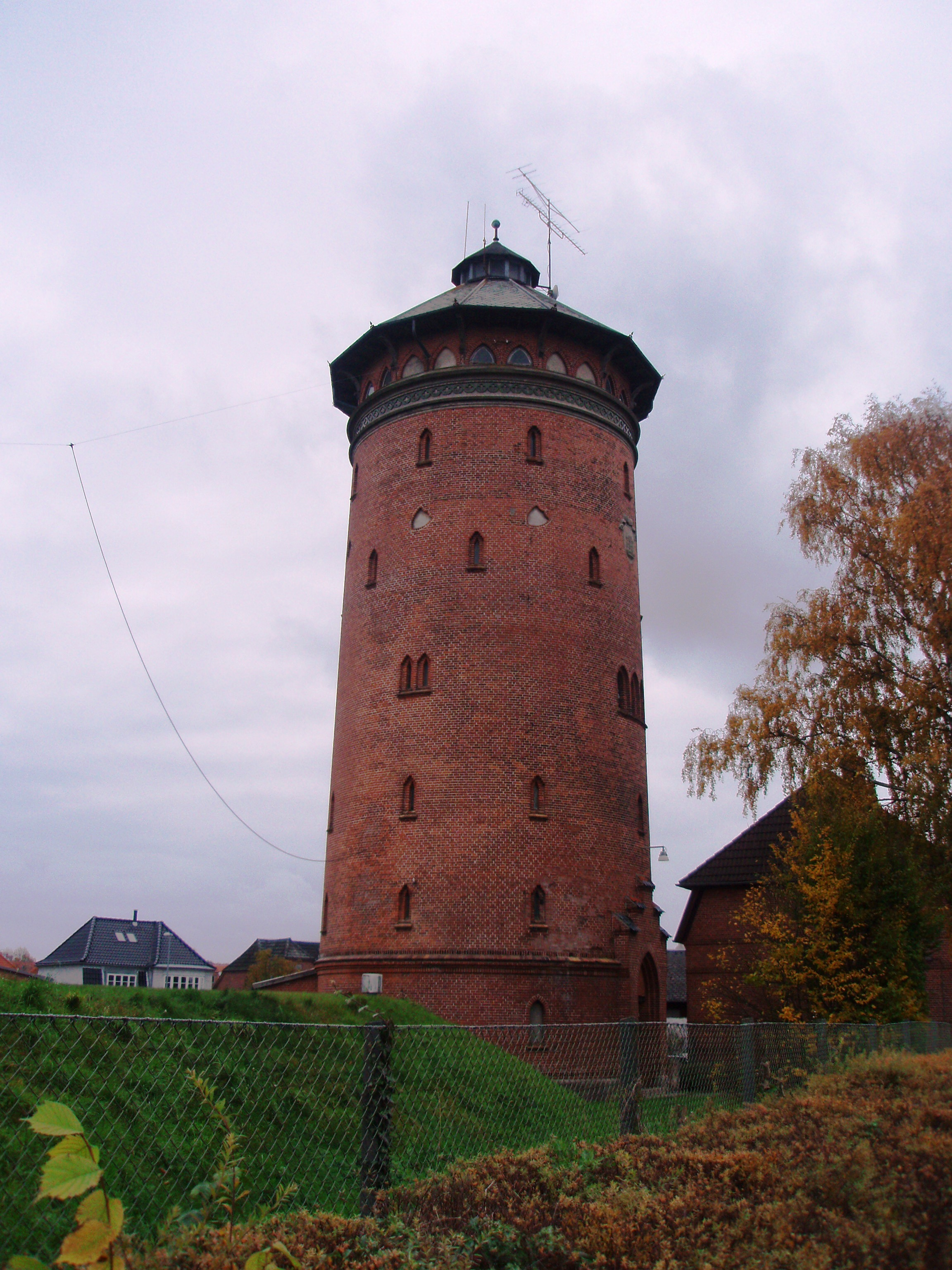
The old water tower of Randers from 1905, now decommissioned.

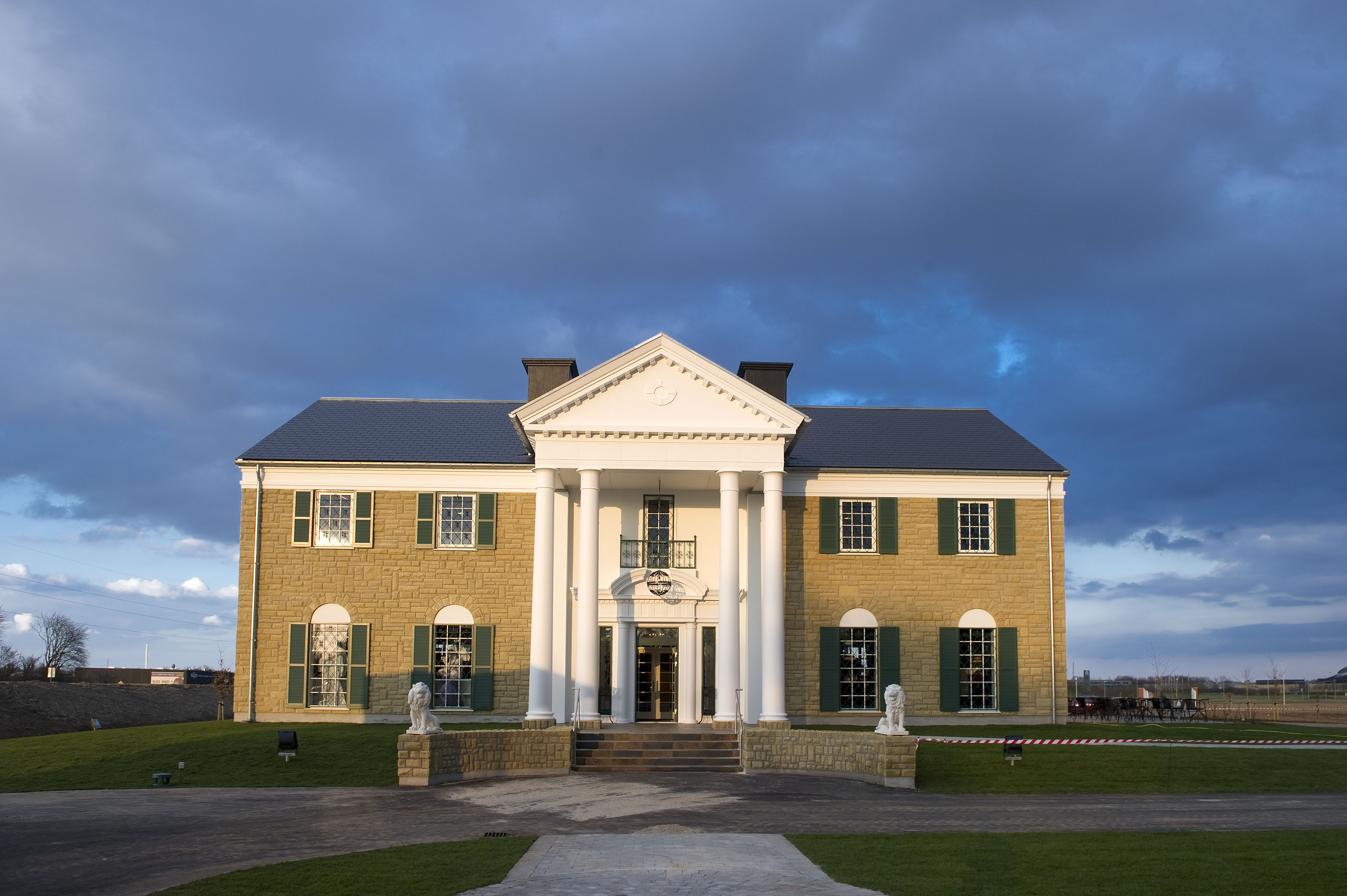
Memphis Mansion, a museum on Elvis Presley.

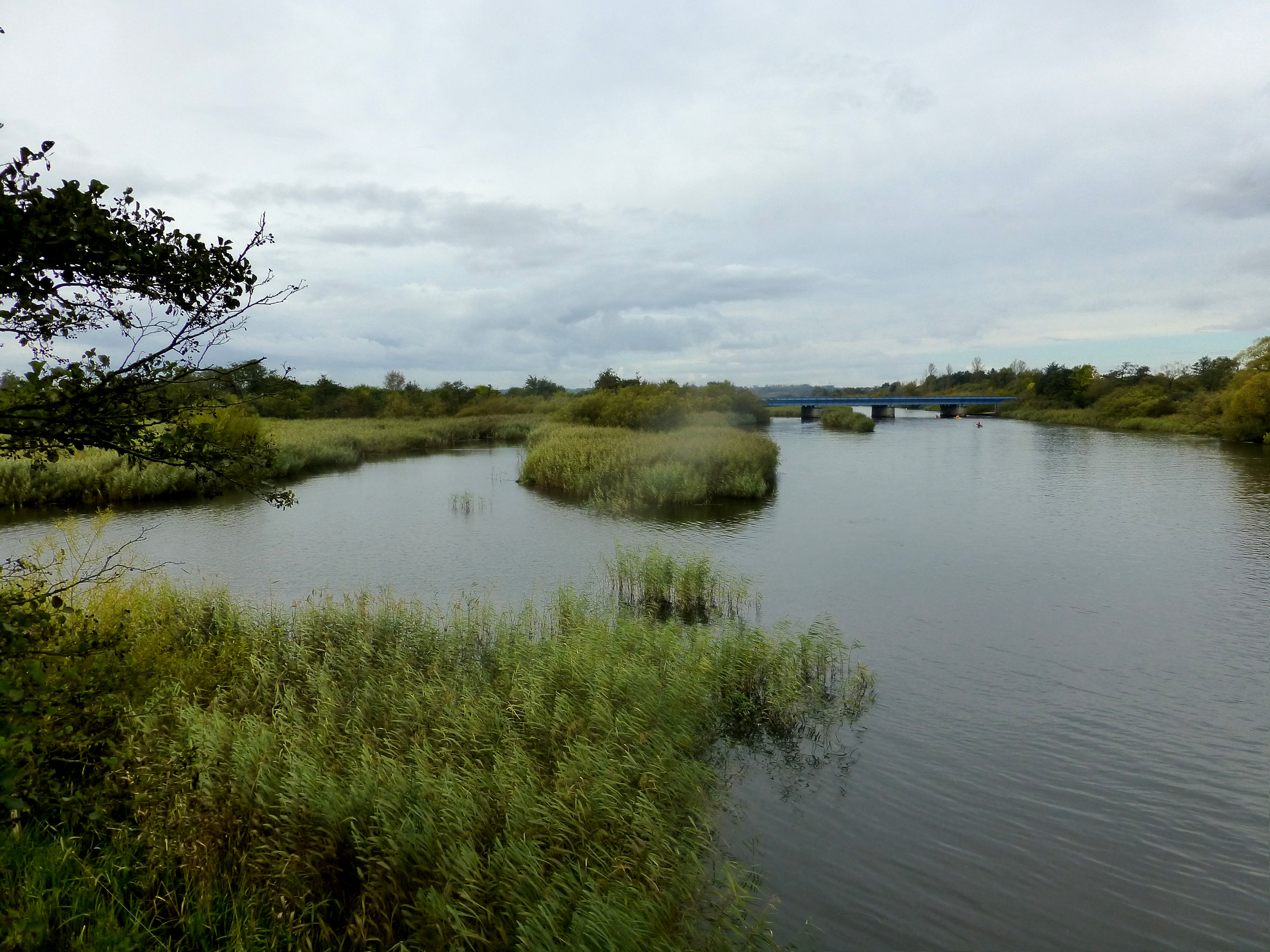
The railway bridges across the Guden River, just outside the city.

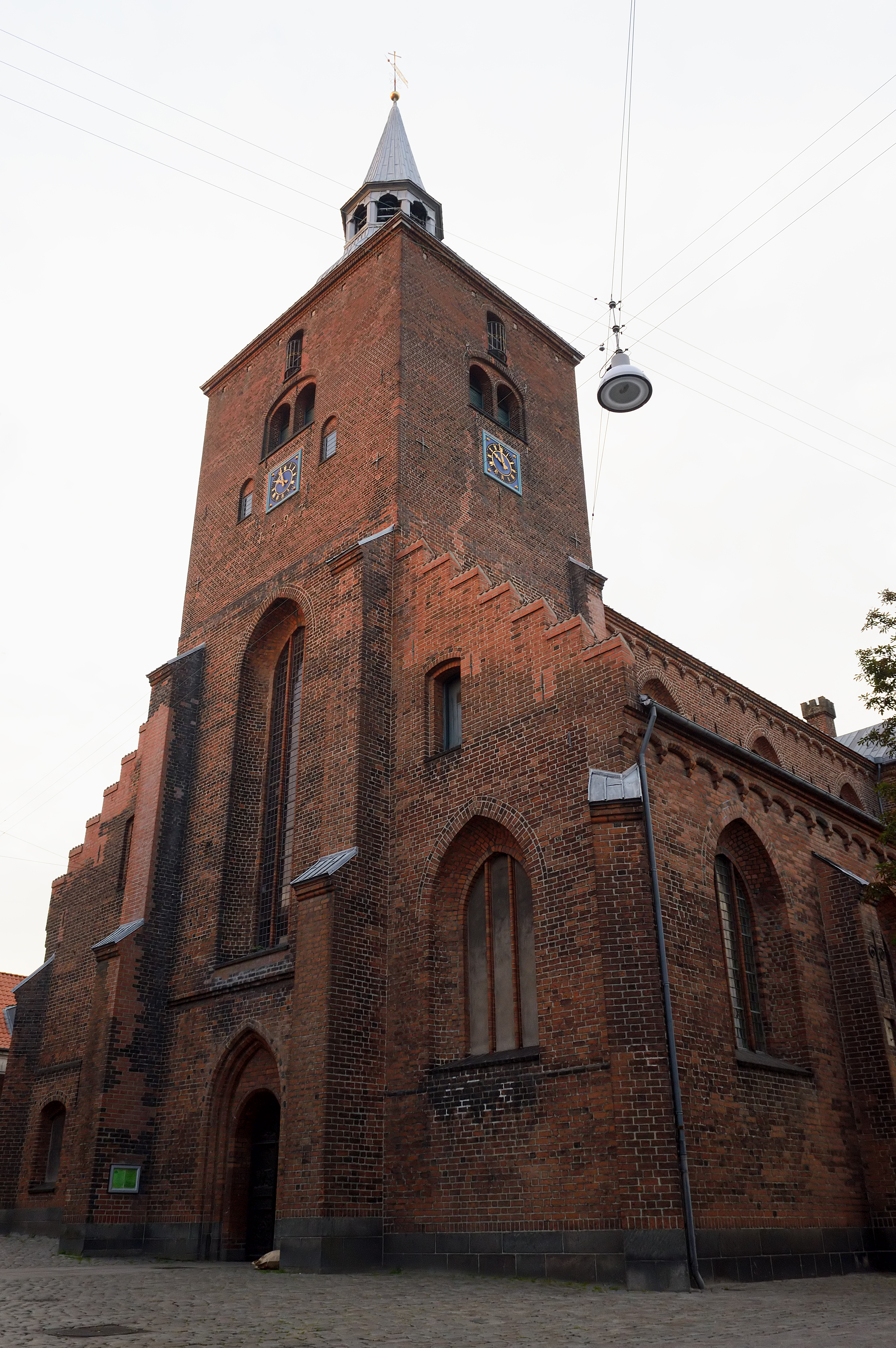
St. Martin's Church in the center of town.

== Sports ==
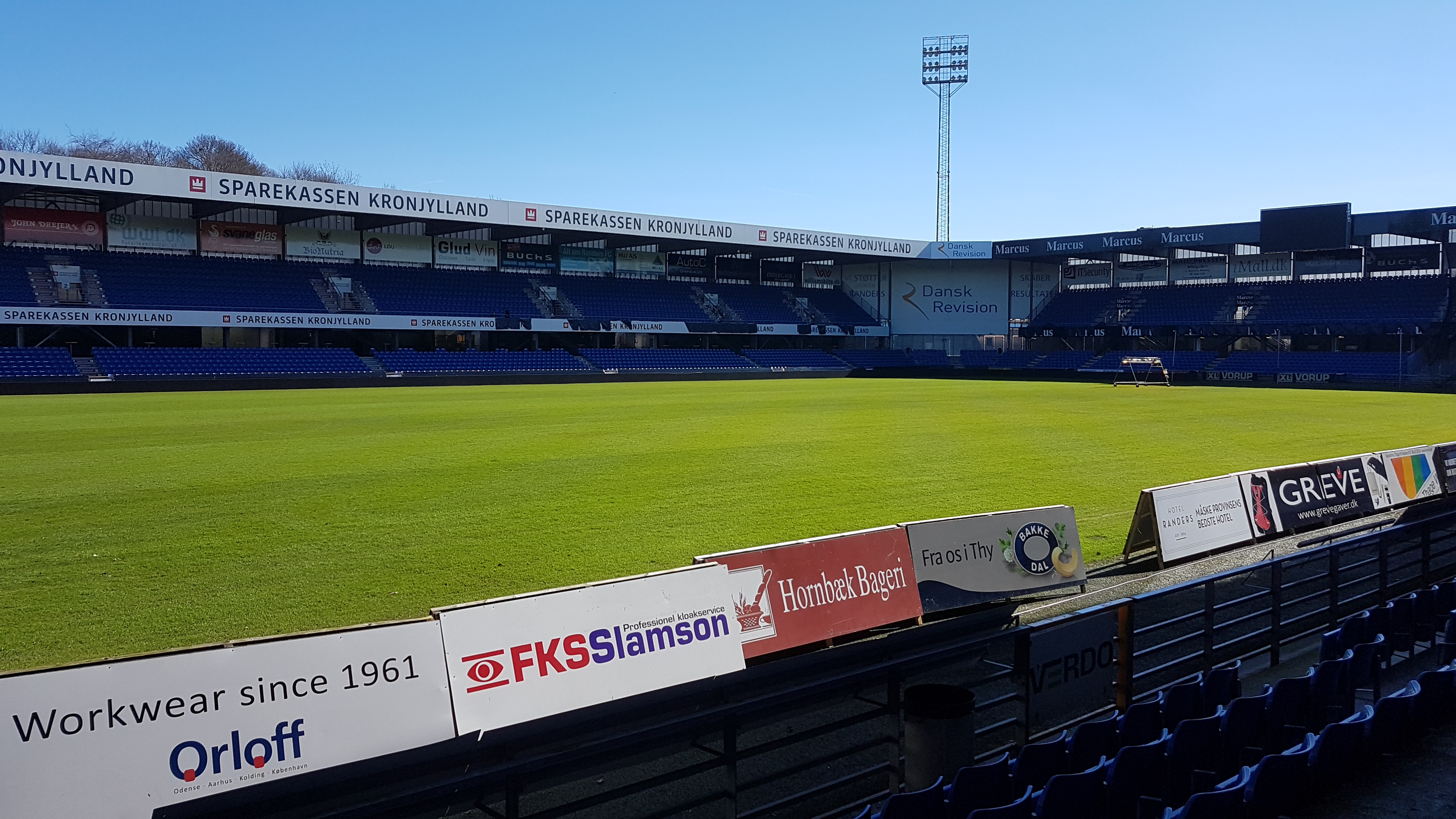
Cepheus Park. Randers FC homeground

=== Football ===
The city's major football team, Randers FC ("Randers Football Club (RFC)"), plays in Denmark's top division, Superligaen. Its home ground is the Cepheus Park Randers.

=== Handball ===
Randers has two major handball teams.

Randers HK represents the city in the second best handball league for women, 1st Division. They have won the Danish Championship once in 2011-12.

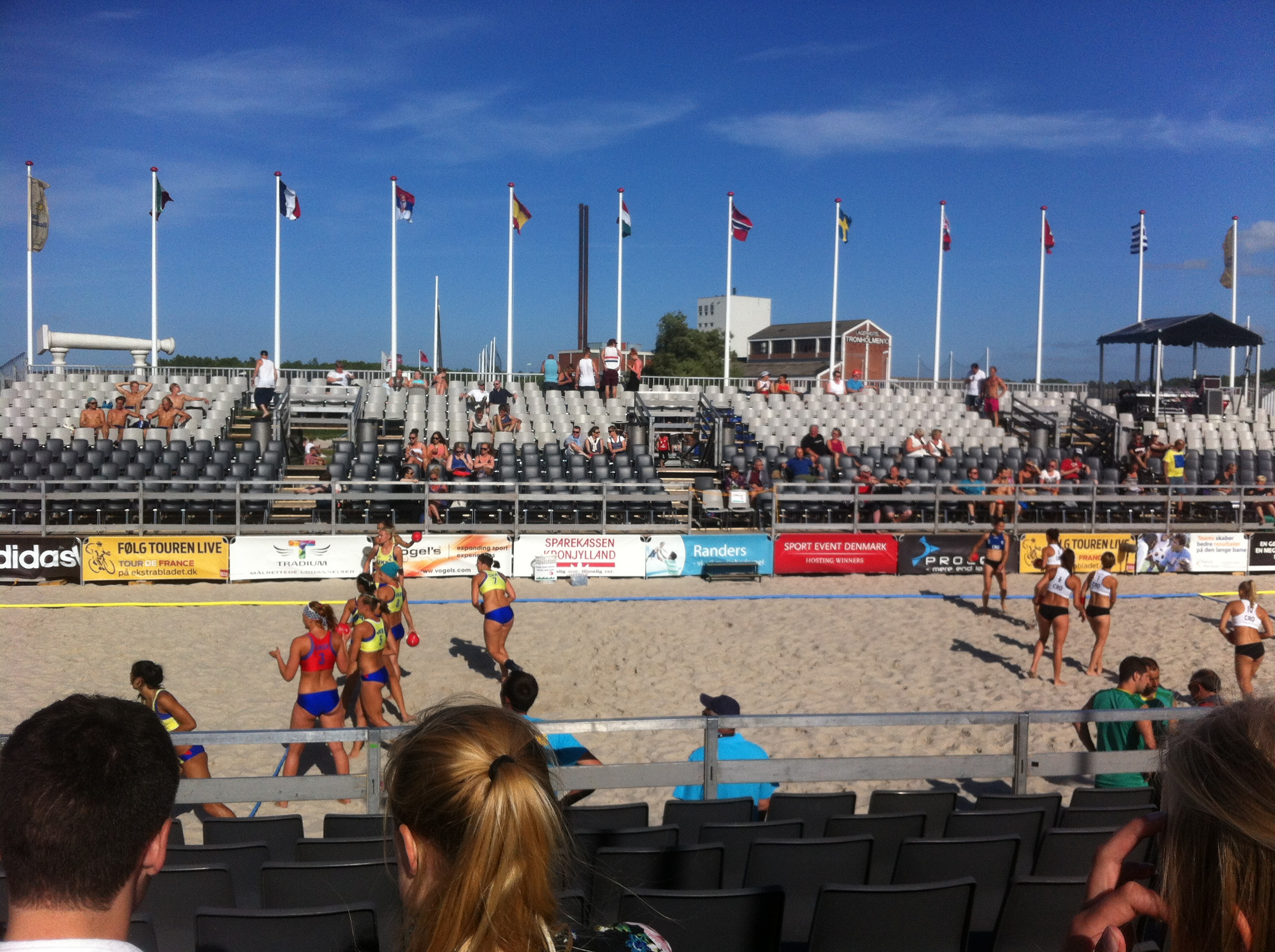
international beach handball tournament at Tronholmen in Randers.

Randers HH plays in the second best handball league for men, 1st Division. Both teams play their home matches, at Arena Randers.

=== Speedway ===
Fladbro Speedway is a motorcycle speedway located on the Randersvej road, about 5 kilometres west of Randers. The stadium hosted the speedway team Randers Speedway Club and then Kronjyllands Speedway Club, who both previously raced in the Danish Speedway League. It was a venue for important events, including a qualifying round of the Speedway World Championship in 1984.

=== Other sports ===
The town is also home to Randers rugby union club and Jutland RLFC, a rugby league team.

Other sports are represented in the city, such basketball as randers cimbria tennis, athletics, American football, floorball, badminton, gymnastics, volleyball and many other.

== Infrastructure ==
=== Transport ===
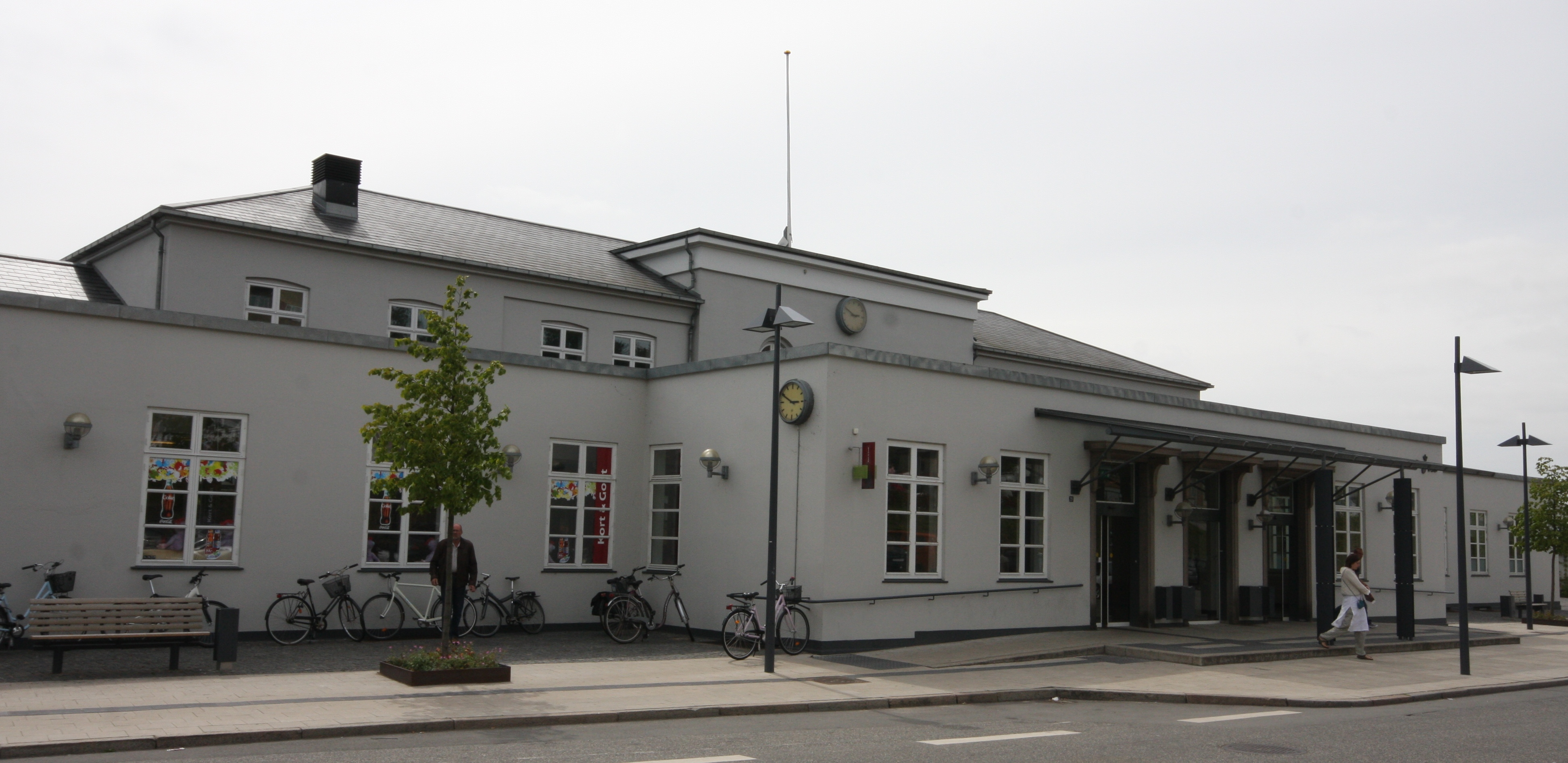
Front façade of Randers railway station.

Randers is served by Randers railway station. It is located on the Aarhus-Aalborg railway line and offers direct InterCity services to Copenhagen and Aalborg and regional train services to Aarhus and Aalborg.

=== Healthcare ===
The city is served by Regionshospitalet Randers.

== Education ==
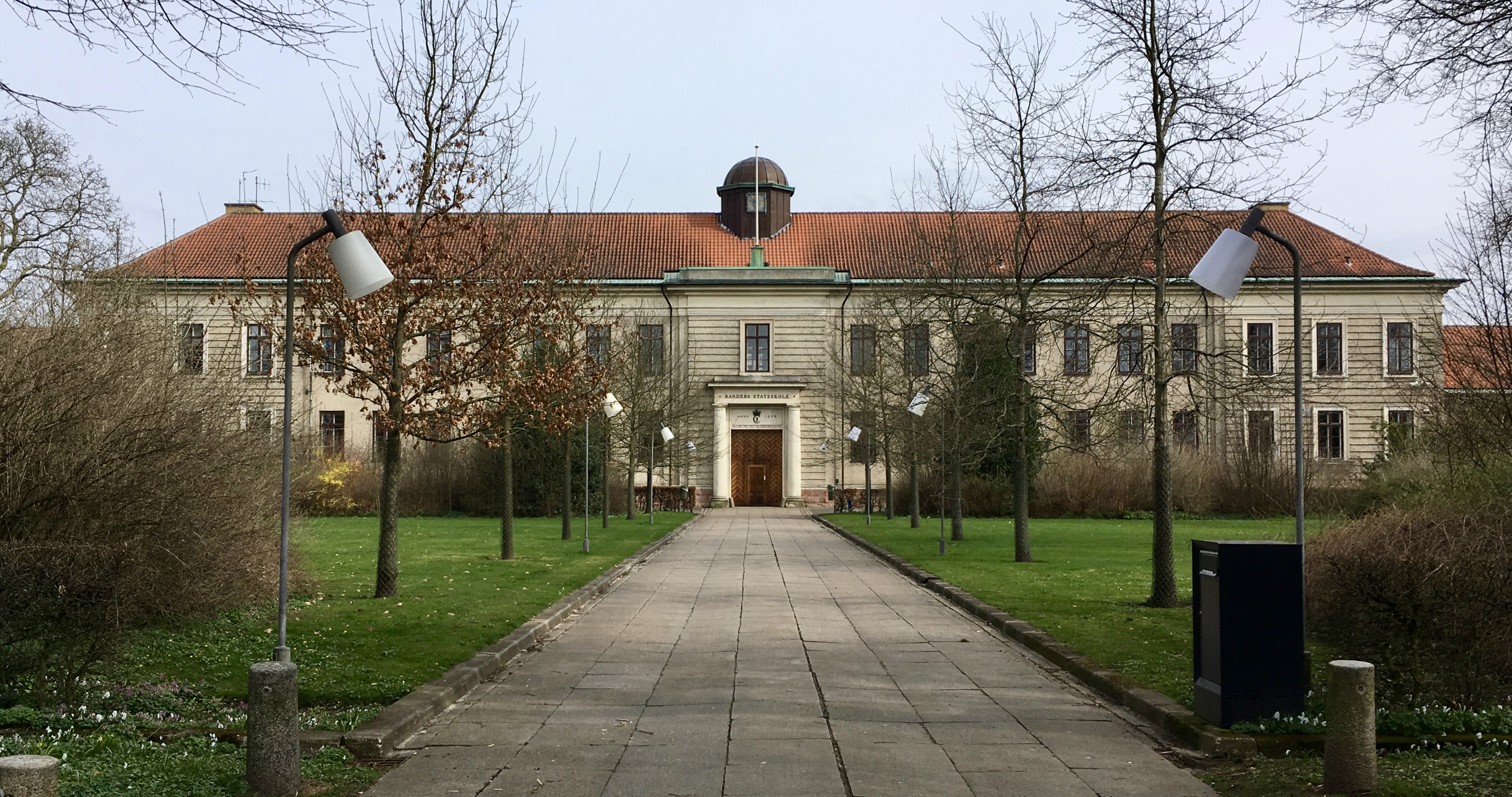
Randers Statsskole. Gymnasium

=== Public and private schools – Danish Folkeskole Education ===
There are many public and private schools in the city, with Randers Realskole as the biggest private school in Denmark.

=== Gymnasium and other secondary education in Denmark ===
Randers has several different gymnasiums and technical educations. Randers Statsskole is the oldest of the gymnasiums in the city, with many old traditions.

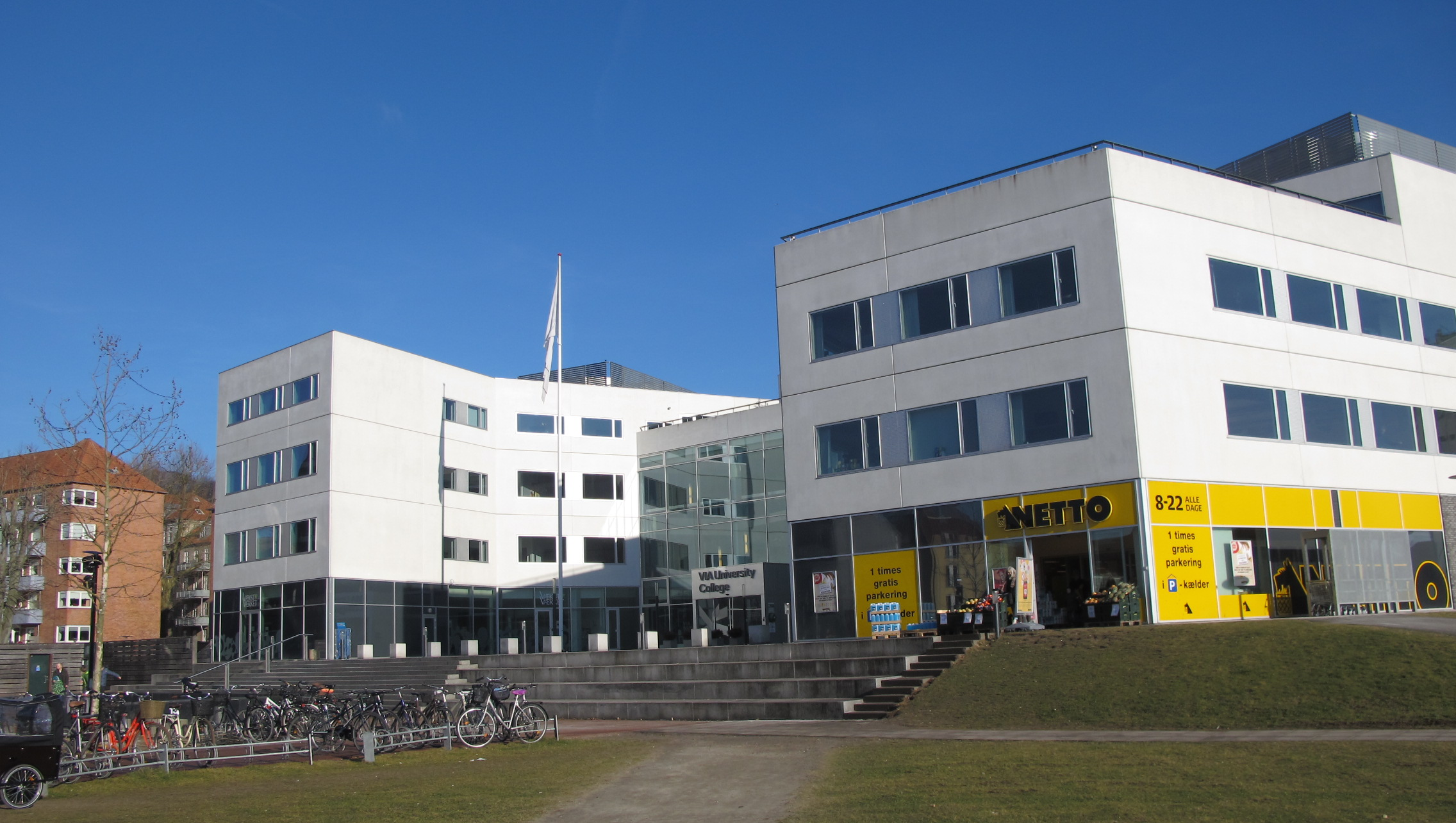
Via University College. Campus Randers

=== University College and Business Academy – Post-secondary education ===
VIA University College in Randers offers education in fields such as social education, nursing and psychomotor therapy. The campus is located at the city center and was built in 2011.

Dania Academy is a business academy and offers various kinds of educations in the fields of business, technology and IT. The headquarters are located in Randers, with additional satellite campuses in Grenaa, Skive, Viborg, Hobro, Hedensted, Silkeborg and Horsens.

== Notable people ==
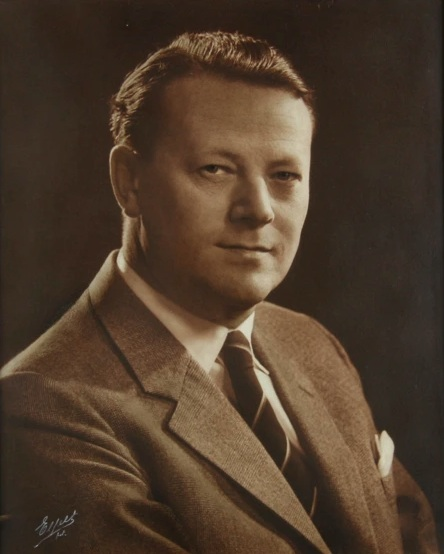
Jens Otto Krag

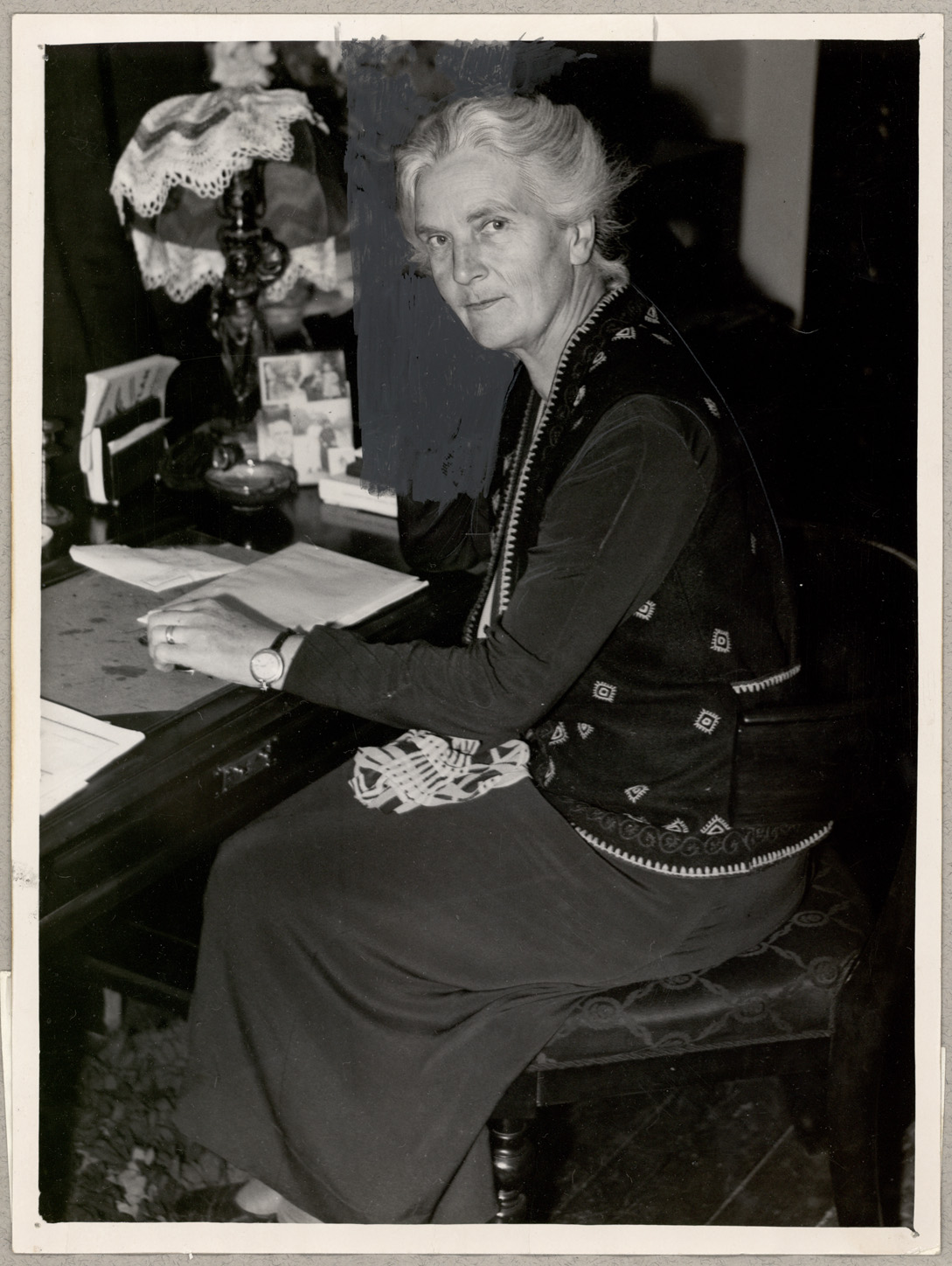
Inger Gautier Schmit

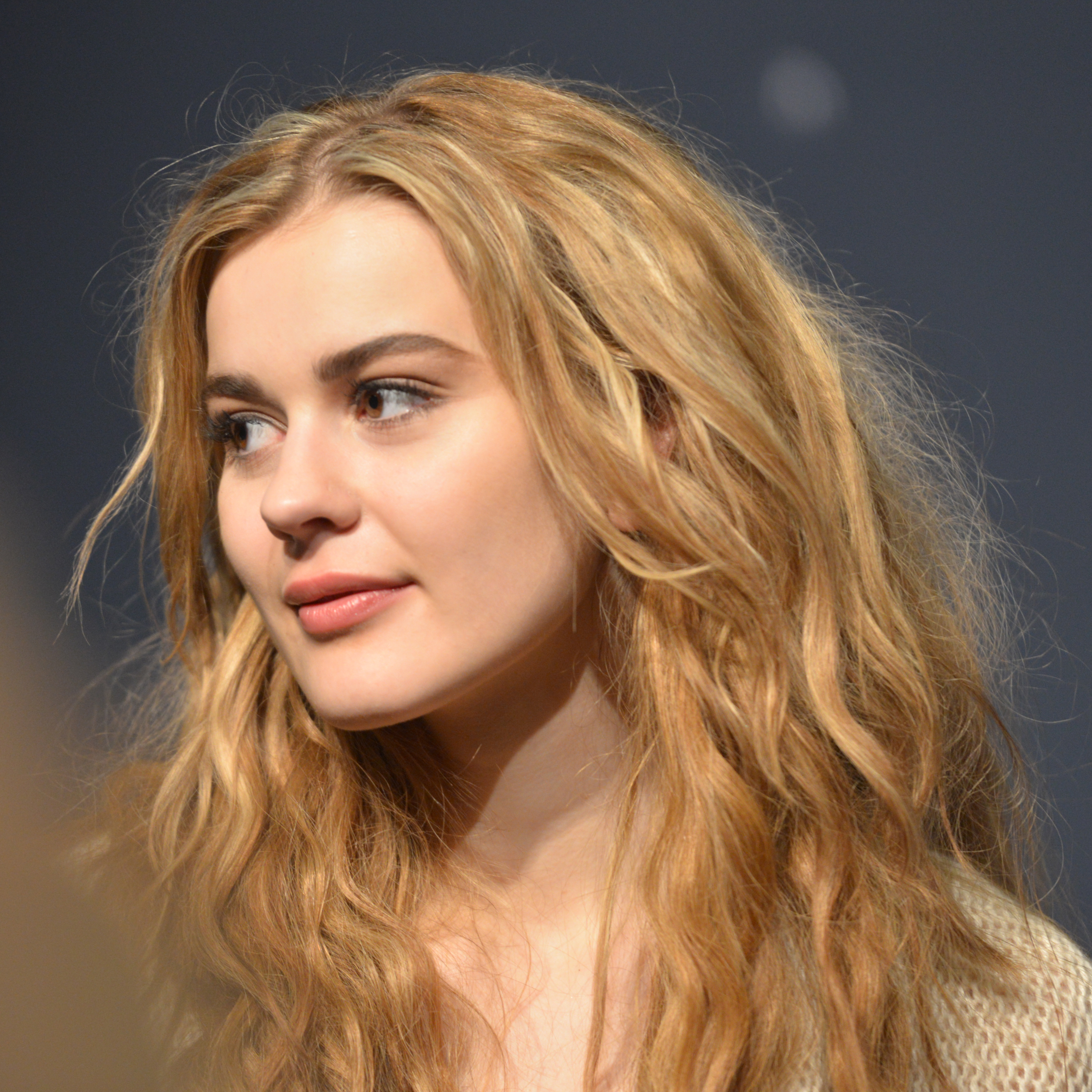
Emmelie de Forest

=== Public service and academics ===
- Jens Peter Trap (1810–1885) a Danish royal cabinet secretary and topographic writer
- Otto Jespersen (1860–1943) a Danish linguist, specialized in the English language
- Karin Michaëlis (1872–1950), journalist and author
- Alma Dahlerup (1874–1969) a Danish-American philanthropist who supported Danish seamen in WWII
- Inger Gautier Schmit (1877–1963) a politician, one of the first five women in the Landsting
- Anker Engelund (1889–1961) a Danish civil engineer and university professor
- Jens Otto Krag (1914–1978), politician, Prime Minister of Denmark, 1962–68 and 1971–72
- Lise Roel and Hugo Höstrup (both born 1928) architects
- Mogens Camre (1936–2016), politician and MEP
- Stefan G. Rasmussen (born 1947) former pilot and politician
- Tim Sloth Jørgensen (born 1951) a senior officer in the Royal Danish Navy and former Chief of Defence of the Danish Armed Forces
- Henrik Wigh-Poulsen (born 1959) a Danish theologian and Bishop of Aarhus since 2015

=== Arts ===
- Johan Rohde (1856–1935) painter, lithographer, and designer
- Tekla Griebel-Wandall (1866–1940) composer and music educator
- Stellan Rye (1880–1914), screenwriter and film director
- Folmer Bonnén (1885–1960) painter and journalist
- Johan Ankerstjerne (1886–1959) cinematographer
- Ville Jais Nielsen (1886–1949) painter, used strong brushstrokes and sensitive lighting
- La Norma Fox (1926–2026), international trapeze artist
- Finn Henriksen (1933–2008) film director and screenwriter
- Peter Steen (1936–2013) actor
- Henning Camre (born 1938) cinematographer and film industry administrator
- Flemming Jørgensen (1947–2011) singer, songwriter, musician, and actor
- Peder Pedersen (born 1971) film director of humorous music videos and animated shorts
- Some members of Svartsot, Folk Metal band
- Some members of Natural Born Hippies, an all-male Pop-rock band
- Emmelie de Forest, (born 1993) singer-songwriter, winner of the Eurovision Song Contest 2013

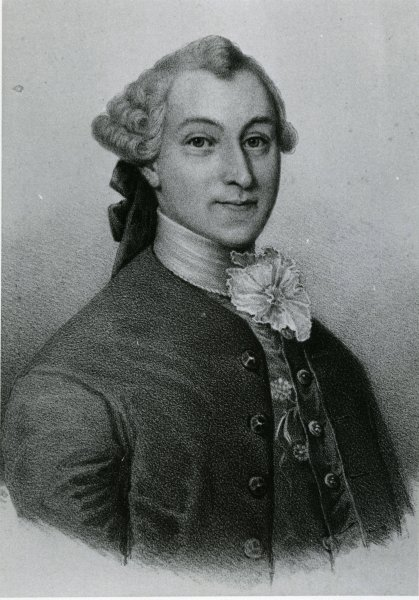
Niels Brock

=== Science and business ===
- Niels Brock (1731–1802) merchant, founded Niels Brock Copenhagen Business College
- Bianco Luno (1795–1852) book printer - Bianco Lunos Bogtrykkeri
- Christian Juel (1855–1935) mathematician, specializing in geometry
- Nikolaj Hartz (1867–1937) geologist and botanist
- Michael Westergård Jensen (1916–1944) merchant and executed resistance fighter
- Søren Galatius (born 1976) mathematician at Copenhagen University

=== Sport ===
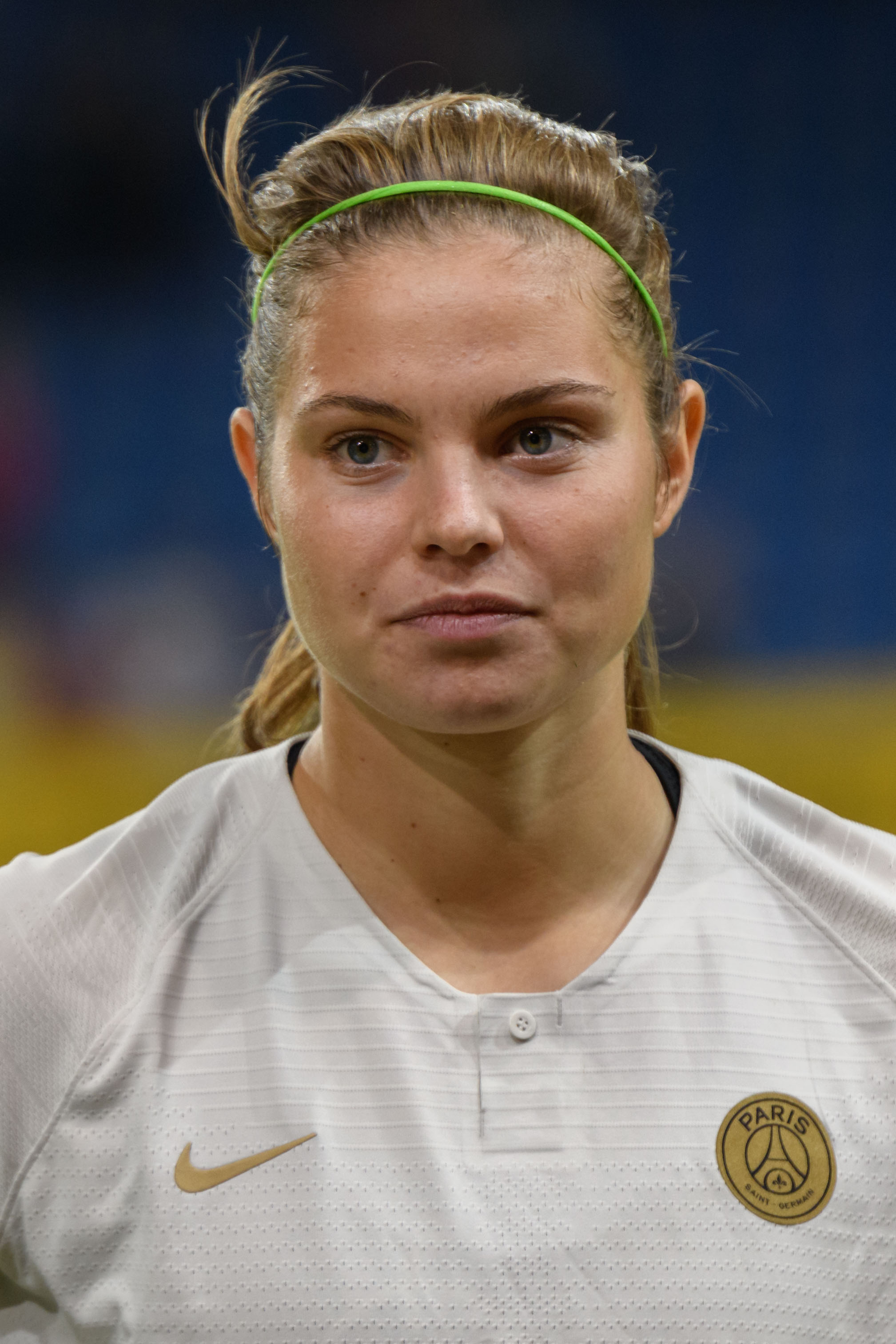
Signe Bruun

- Leo Nielsen (1909–1968) a Danish track cyclist, team gold medalist at the 1928 Summer Olympics and a team silver medalist at the 1932 Summer Olympics
- Jørgen Rasmussen (born 1945) former footballer, played at the 1972 Summer Olympics
- Per Bjerregaard (born 1946) a Danish physician, former footballer and Chairman of Brøndby IF
- Jesper Tørring (born 1947), Olympic hurdler and high-jumper
- Anita Christensen (born 1972) a world champion professional boxer
- Chris Sørensen (born 1977) a retired footballer, with over 430 club caps
- Michael Gravgaard (born 1978), football player with 317 club caps
- Katrine Fruelund (born 1978), handball player, twice team gold medalist at the 2000 and 2004 Summer Olympics
- Jens-Erik Madsen (born 1981), a Danish former professional racing cyclist
- Camilla Dalby (born 1988), handball player
- Niko Hansen, (born 1994), Danish/American retired football player
- Signe Bruun (born 1998), footballer for Denmark
- Kasper Høgh (born 2000), footballer
- Theodor Jensen, (born 2006), Danish racecar driver

== Twin towns ==
Randers is twinned with:

Akureyri, Iceland; Ålesund, Norway	Lahti, Finland; Västerås, Sweden; Jelenia Góra, Poland

== See also ==
- Chronicle of the Expulsion of the Grayfriars § Chapter 8 Concerning the Friary at Randers

== Sources ==
- "Danmarks Købstæder: Randers". dendigitalebyport.byhistorie.dk (in Danish).
