= Ludvig Birkedal-Barfod =

Danish musician

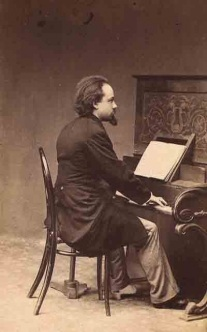
- Born: 27 May 1850
- Died: 17 October 1937 (aged 87)
- Education: Royal Danish Academy of Music
- Occupation: Composer Organist

Ludvig Birkedal-Barfod (27 May 1850 – 17 October 1937) was a Danish composer and organist.

The son of the writer Frederik Barfod, he was trained as an organist at the Royal Danish Academy of Music 1870–1872. In 1873 he became organist at Metodistkirken in Copenhagen, 1877–1895, he was at Our Lady Church in Svendborg and 1894–1925 at Marble Church in Copenhagen. Moreover, he wrote music reviews for the Christian newspaper, a number of years. Among his own organ pupils included organist and composer Hilda Sehested. In 1903 he went on study tour to Sweden, Finland, Russia and Germany. In 1905 he was teacher of music theory and organ at Gottfred Matthison-Hansen Music Institute.

He wrote most of his music singing and piano and organ. In addition, he edited a widely used collection of hymn tunes, Menighedens Melodies, and published some exercises and other training music.
