= Tekla Griebel-Wandall =

Danish composer (1866–1940)

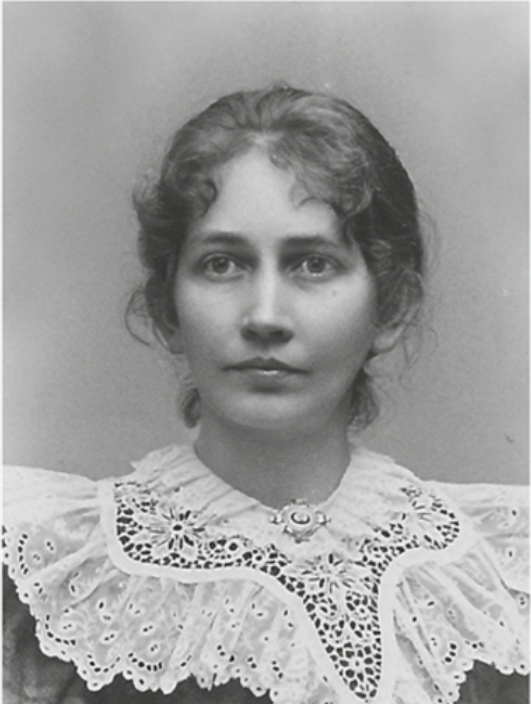
Tekla Griebel-Wandall (1896)

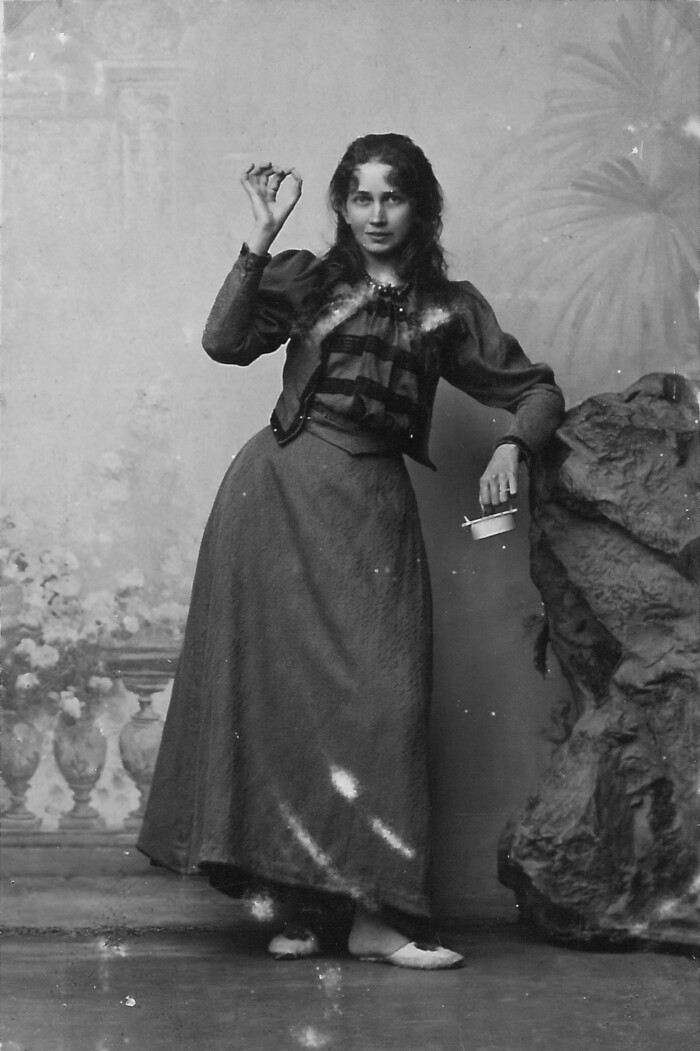
Tekla Griebel-Wandall (1896)

Tekla Griebel-Wandall (26 February 1866 – 28 June 1940) was a Danish composer and music educator.

== Biography ==
Tekla Griebel was born in Randers, Denmark, the daughter of Theodor Johan Heinrich Griebel (1829–1900) and teacher Camilla Joachimine Andresen (1829–91). She began her musical studies at the age of seven, taking piano lessons from her father. Later she took singing lessons, and at the age of fifteen, she was admitted to Draw School for Women where she studied to be a figurative artist. However, she was more interested in music, and in 1886 she wrote her first opera Don Juan de Marana (eventually performed in 1931).

At the age of sixteen, Tekla Griebel-Wandall began teaching piano, and from 1889 to 1891 she studied voice, piano, composition and theory at the Royal Danish Academy of Music with Jørgen Malling and Orla Rosenhoff. In 1896 she studied in Dresden, financed by Nicole Leth. In 1902 she married theologian and author Hans Frederik Wandall and continued to support the family through teaching music. Prominent students included Danish opera singer Peter Cornelius and pianist Ellen Gilberg.

Working reduced the time Griebel-Wandall had for composition, but she wrote a total of 103 works, ranging from songs and small piano pieces to cantatas and operas. She also wrote music theory publications and a novel. Her successful student Alice Shaw became her patron and funded the publication of four books of her compositions in 1928. Griebel-Wandall died in Buddinge, Gladsakse.

== Works ==
Most of Griebel-Wandall's compositions are vocal music, including opera and songs. Notable works include:

- Fem Sange (ca. 1893)
- Skjøn Karen (opera 1894)
- I Rosentiden (ballet 1895)
- Musikalsk Børnehave (1898)
- Fred (1899)
- Musikteori i korte Træk (1900)
- Naar vi døde vaagner (1901)
- Musikteori for Sangere (1905)
- Kantate ved genforeningsfesten for sønderjyske kvinder (1920)
- Gækken og Narren (1925)
- Hrane (opera 1925)
- Klaverkompositioner I (1928)

== See also ==
- List of Danish composers
