= Orla Rosenhoff =

Danish musician

Orla Albert Vilhelm Rosenhoff (1 October 1844 – 4 June 1905) was a Danish musician, the son of Caspar Claudius Rosenhoff, a teacher.

Born in Copenhagen, Rosenhoff was a student of Adolph Lund and later of Niels Gade. When the music academy was established in 1867, Rosenhoff was the acting teacher of piano. He was later employed from 1881 to 1892 as a teacher of harmony, counterpoint and fugue. Teaching became Rosenhoff's life's work, and through it he exerted great influence on generations of Danish musicians, including Tekla Griebel-Wandall, Carl Nielsen and Hilda Sehested.

As a composer, he created works of chamber music (quintet, sextet), songs, piano pieces (including pedal studies), and two overtures for orchestra. He published three collections of exercises for use in music theory lessons.
