= Randers Tropical Zoo =

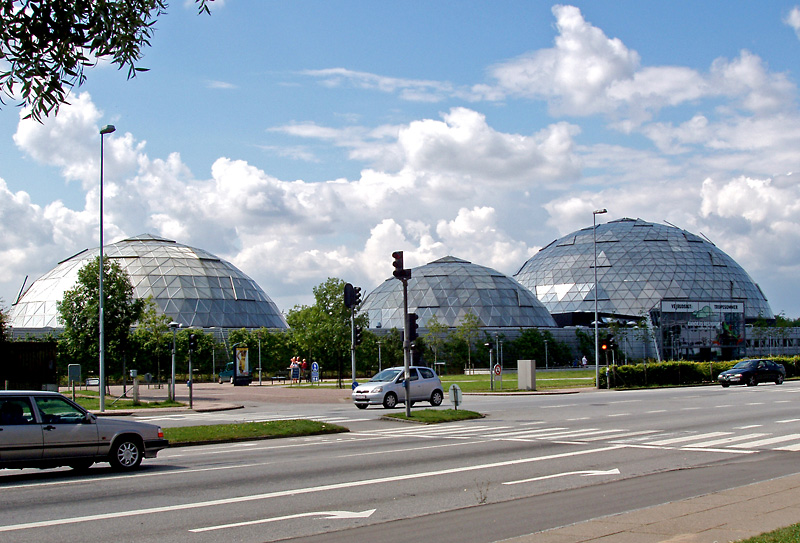
- The three domes of the zoo
- Interactive map of Randers Tropical Zoo
- 56°27′25″N 10°01′58″E
- Date opened: 1996
- Location: Randers, Denmark
- No. of species: Ca. 275
- Memberships: EAZA
- Website: www.regnskoven.dk/en/frontpage

Randers Tropical Zoo (Danish: Randers Regnskov) is an indoor zoo in Randers, Denmark. It is located in three big domes, with the biomes of Africa, Asia, and South America. The domes contain animals from the biomes, and most of the animals live freely in the domes. The climate inside the domes is controlled by computers because the length of daylight hours varies much more in Denmark than in tropical latitudes.

== History ==
The zoo first opened with two domes (Africa and Asia); the third being built later. In total there are approximately 275 animal species in Randers Tropical Zoo; about 200 in the domes and 75 in the saltwater aquarium. The South American dome is 2,000 m^{2} (22,000 ft^{2}) and is home to species such as South American tapir, West Indian manatee, callitrichid monkeys and macaws; the African dome is 500 m^{2} (5,400 ft^{2}) and is home to species such as lemurs; and the Asian dome is 700 m^{2} (7,500 ft^{2}) and is home of species such as pileated gibbon and Komodo dragon. In addition, there are many reptiles, a snakeyard with free harmless snakes, and a saltwater aquarium with tropical fish.

In 2015, an exhibit for jaguars opened, which is the first located outside the domes. Adjacent to the domes is Danmarksparken ("Denmark Park") with farm animals and playgrounds.
