= Randers RC =

- Full name: Randers Rugby Club
- Nickname: The Raiders
- Founded: 2009
- Location: Randers, Denmark
- Ground(s): Nørrevangsskolen, Glentevej 15, 8930 Randers NØ
- Chairman: (England) Mike Hawkins (also World Rugby level 3 Referee)
- Coach: (Samoa) Viiga Lima
- Captain: Kenneth Lybech
- League: 2nd Division West
Team kit

Randers RC is a Danish rugby club in Randers, which plays in the DRU 2nd division west. The Raiders won their division in 2013.
