= St Martin's Church, Randers =

Coordinates: 56°27′36″N 10°2′6″E

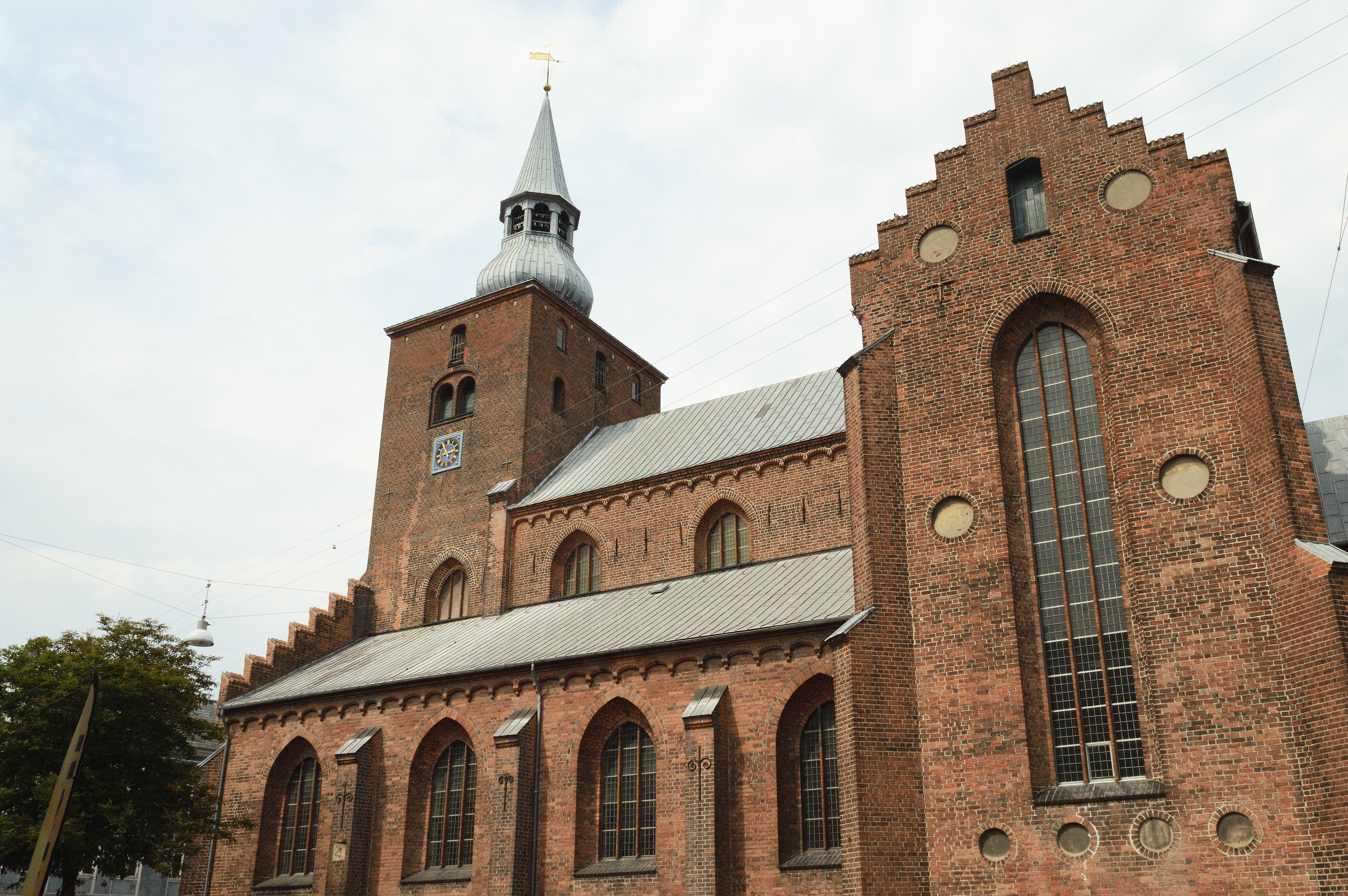
St Martin's Church, Randers

St Martin's Church (Danish: Sankt Mortens Kirke) is a red brick church in Randers in the north of Jutland, Denmark. It was built from 1494 to 1520 on the site of an earlier church which was first mentioned in 1346.

== History and architecture ==
The red-brick building stands on a Romanesque ashlar foundation which served a former church mentioned in sources from 1346. Dedicated to St Martin of Tours, it is the only remaining church of the five built in Randers during the Middle Ages. A Latin inscription above the altar states it was built by Prior J (i.e. Jens Mathiesen) in 1494. It originally formed part of the Monastery of the Holy Spirit (Helligåndskloster) but became a parish church in 1534, shortly before the Reformation.

The church now consists of a central nave flanked by aisles on either side. It leads to a polygonal chancel at the east end which is rather lower than the nave itself. The north aisle has ten walled-in arches intended to provide access to the monastery. The windows are pointed Gothic. King John's Chapel to the south resembles a small transept, as in Aarhus Cathedral. The west tower was built in 1795 although the carved tower door with a scene from Ezekiel (c. 1700) probably originally served another entrance. It is believed to be the work of Lauridtz Jensen from Essenbæk. The church was renovated from 1868–70 under the leadership of Fritz Uldall.

== Interior and furnishings ==
The Baroque altarpiece from 1765 stands above a wooden altar painted to look like marble. The altar paintings are of the Expulsion from the Garden of Eden, The Last Supper and the Adoration of the Magi. The current painting on the altarpiece flanked by Corinthian columns is a work by Per Kirkeby from 2004 depicting Christ in the Garden of Gethsemane. The carved oak pulpit and canopy from 1686 are also the work of Jensen. The reliefs depict Christ's Passion flanked by sculpted portraits of the Four Apostles. Jensen also created the carved baptismal screen (late 17th century). The modern Cubic block-shaped baptismal font is the work of Jais Nielsen (1951). The organ from 1751 has been renovated and rebuilt several times since 1918, most recently by P.G. Andersen in connection with the church's 500th anniversary in 1994.

== Gallery ==
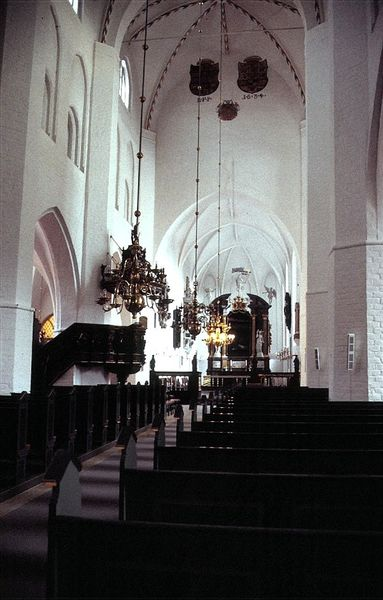
Interior looking east

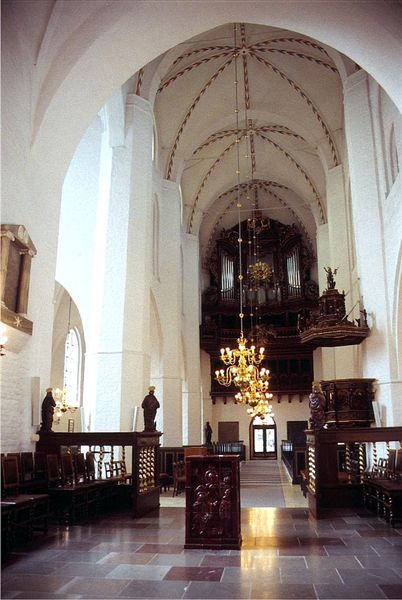
Interior looking west

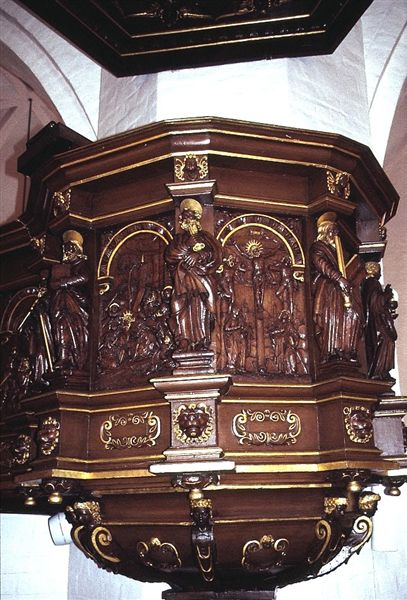
Pulpit

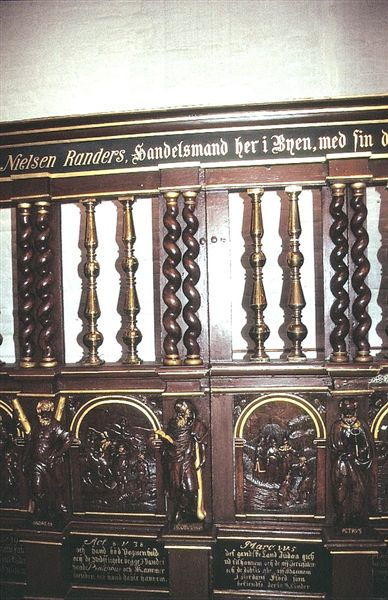
Baptismal screen

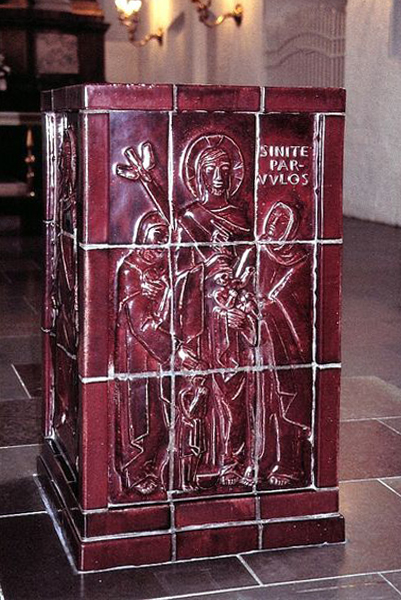
Font

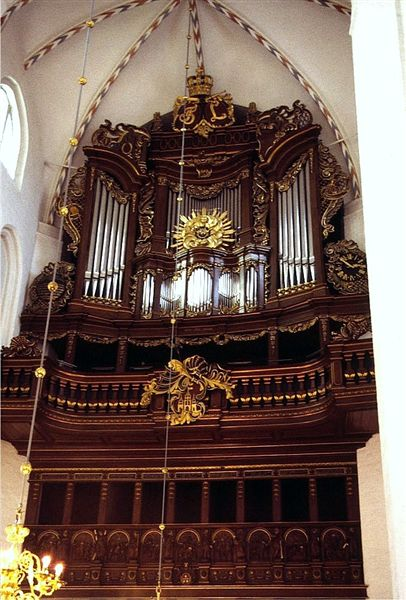
Organ
