= St. Paul's Church, Hadsten =

St. Paul's Church
- Sankt Pauls Kirke
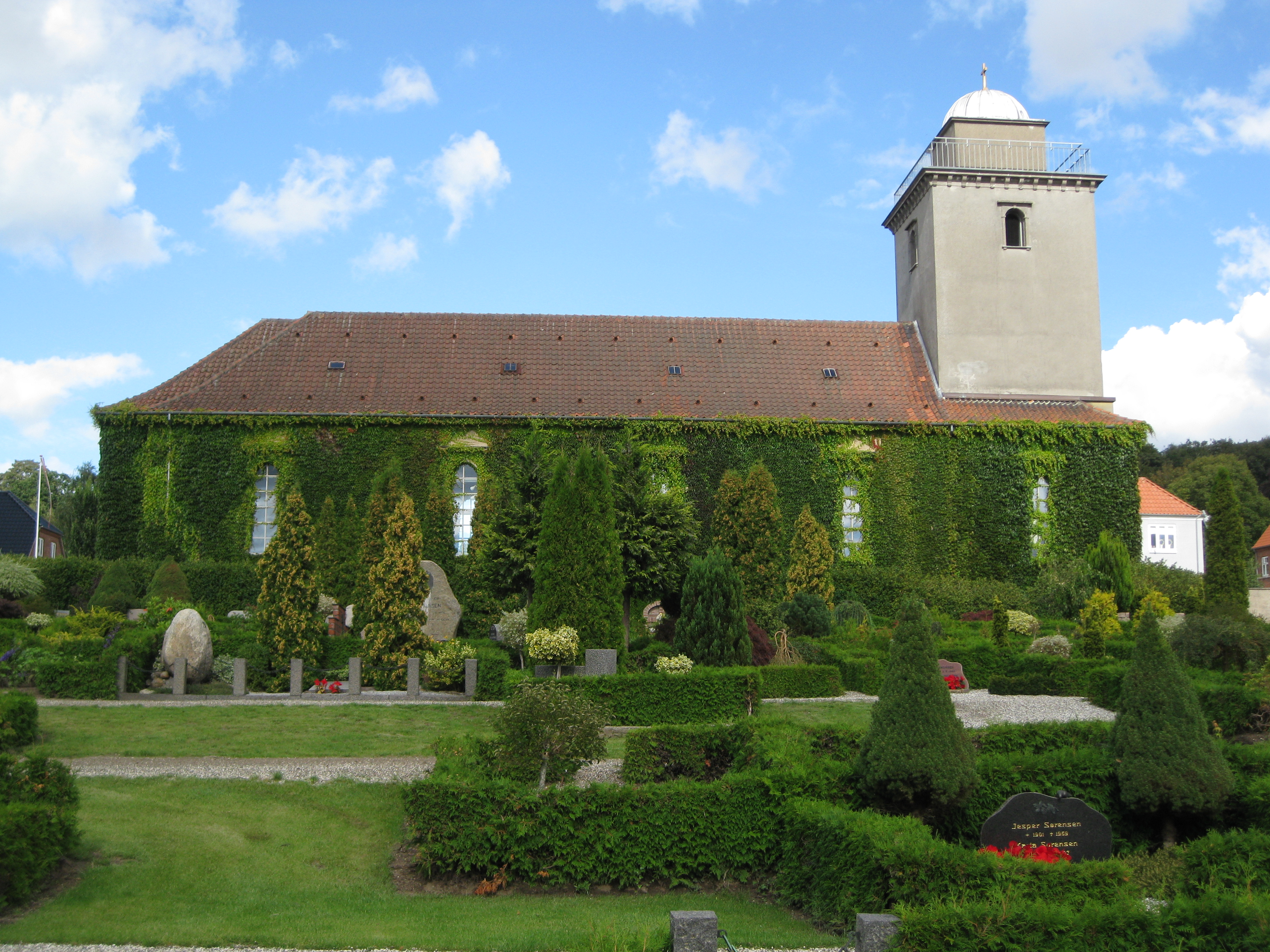

- Location within Denmark
- 56°19′46.55″N 10°2′40.19″E
- Location: Hadsten, Central Denmark Region
- Country: Denmark
- Denomination: Church of Denmark
- Website: hadstensogne.dk

Architecture
- Architect: Jørgen Kampmann
- Architectural type: Neoclassicism
- Completed: 23 November 1919

Administration
- Archdiocese: Diocese of Aarhus
- Parish: Hadsten Sogn

St. Paul's Church (Danish: Sankt Pauls Kirke), also known as Hadsten Church (Danish: Hadsten Kirke), is a Danish church located in Hadsten, Denmark.

== History ==
In 1913, Hadsten Stationsby had grown to a population of 1350. A large group of citizens were convinced that a city of that size must have a church. Until then, the city was served by two small churches, (Hadsten was divided into two parishes, divided by the river.) both located a few kilometres from the city. From 1900, the churches was supplemented by an Inner Mission community.

The famous Hadsten-doctor, F.B. Larsen, bought in 1898 a farm in the small village Vinterslev. From the farm, he donated a piece of land for the church near the station. The citizens had in 1912 collected 15.000 kr. (2013: 164,821 USD)

In the municipality, the city council sent an application to the Minister of Church in 1914 to fund the building. The Ministry rejected the city council that same year, with the reason, that they didn't see the possibility of providing financial support in near future. The city council did not give up. The same year they received permission for church services in new built Christian Center (Missionshus).

22 July 1916, the city council sent the second application to the Minister of Church. This time, it was approved.

The well known architect, Hack Kampmann, presented a proposal in old architectural style. The proposal was thwarted by the rising cost of materials, because of World War I. At the same time Kampmann's son, Hans Jørgen Kampmann, had an exhibition at Charlottenborg in Copenhagen, where a neoclassism-style church was exhibited.

The church was completed on 23 November 1919. The church is dedicated to St. Paul.
