= Nørre Galten Church =

- Nørre Galten Kirke (in Danish)
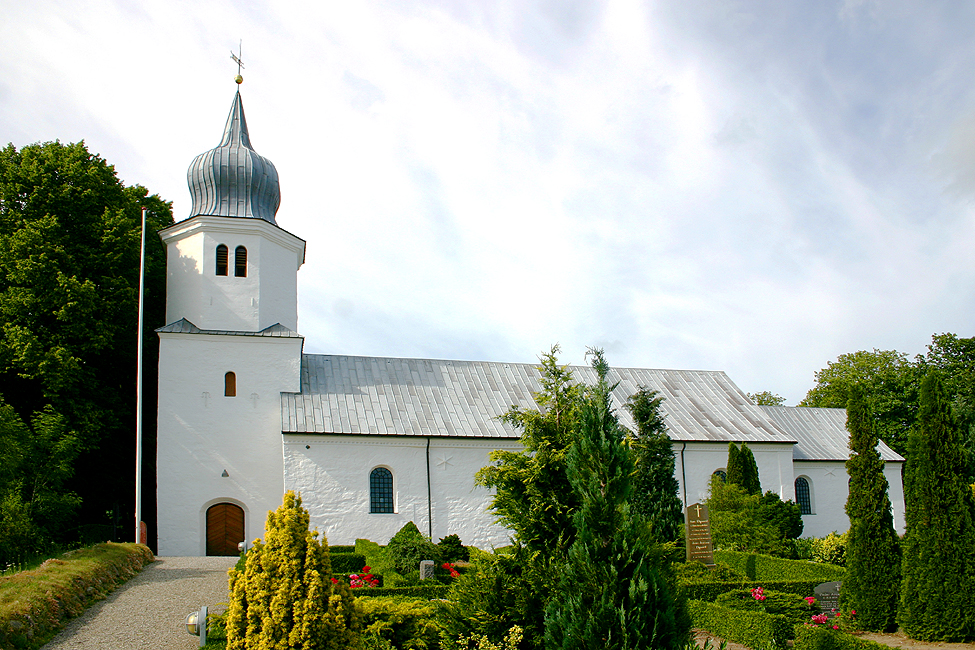
- Nørre Galten Church
- 56°20′54.8″N 10°2′50.3″E
- Location: Nørre Galten, Denmark
- Denomination: Church of Denmark
- Previous denomination: Catholic
- Website: hadstensogne.dk

History
- Founded: 12th century

Nørre Galten Church (Danish: Nørre Galten Kirke) is a Danish church located in Nørre Galten, Denmark. The church is located a few kilometres north of Hadsten, 12 kilometres south of Randers. The church was built in the 12th century.

== Photos ==
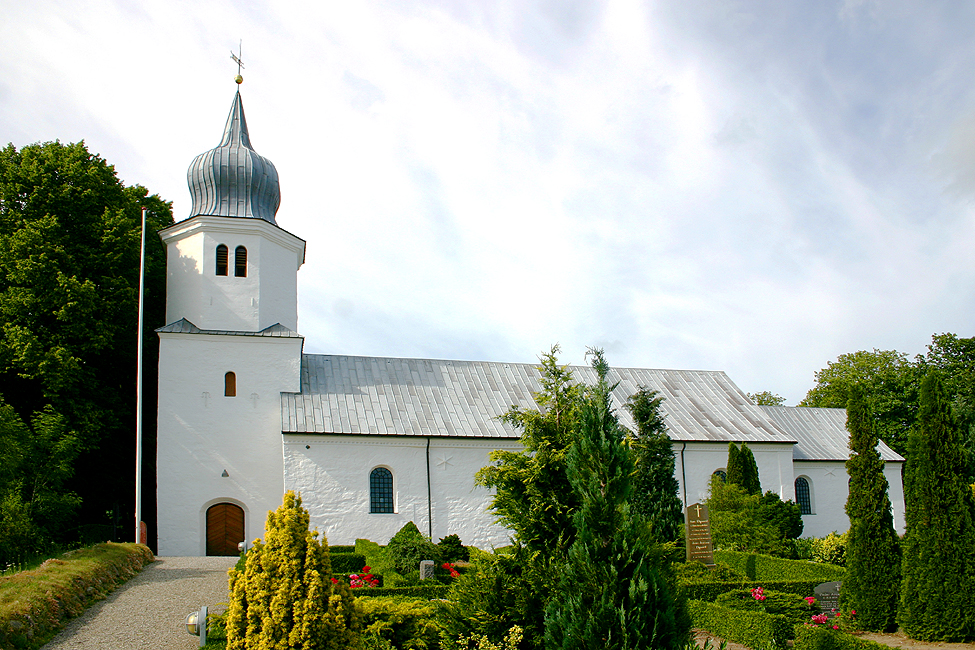
Nørre Galten Church

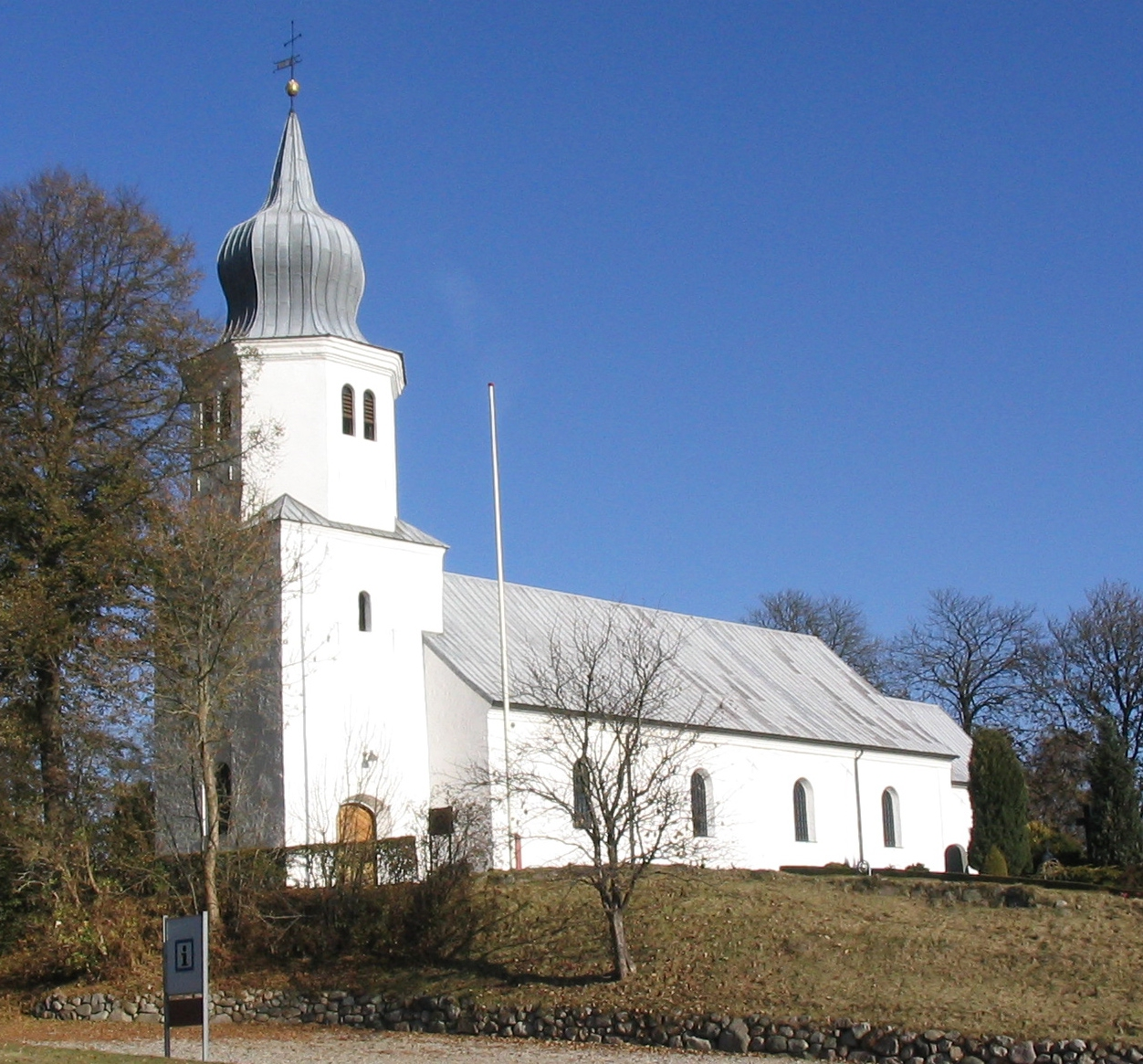
Nørre Galten Church
