= Nørre Galten =

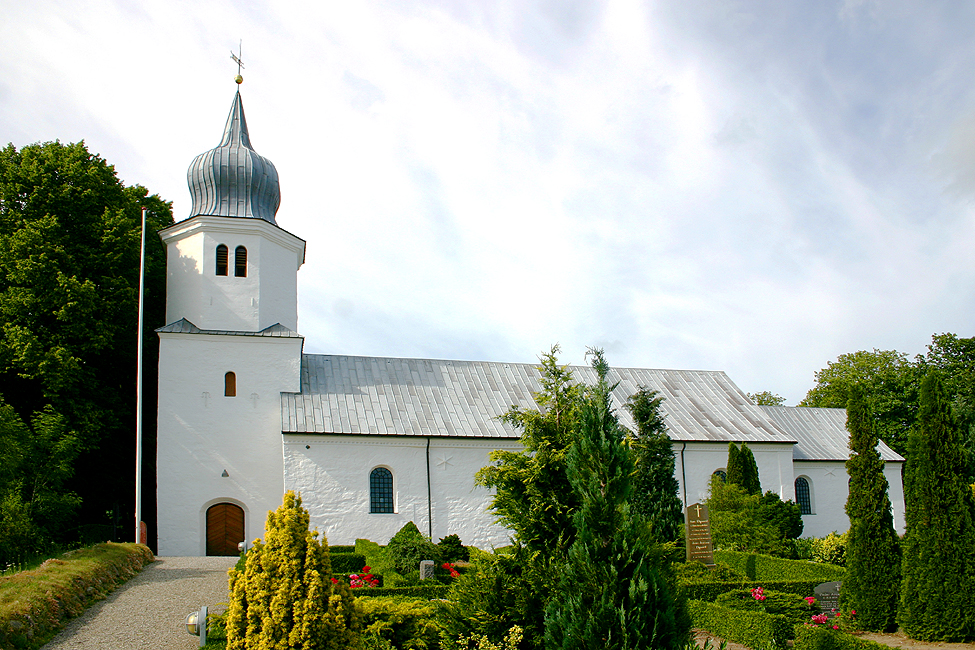
- Nørre Galten Church

- Location in Central Denmark Region Nørre Galten (Denmark)
- Coordinates: 56°20′55″N 10°2′29″E
- Country: Denmark
- Region: Central Denmark
- Municipality: Favrskov

Population (2026)
  - Total: 203
- Time zone: UTC+1 (Central European Time)
  - Summer (DST): UTC+2 (Central European Summer Time)
- Postal code: 8370 Hadsten

Nørre Galten is a village in Eastern Jutland, Denmark, a few kilometres north of Hadsten. Politically it is part of the Central Denmark Region and Favrskov Municipality. It has a population of 203 (1 January 2026).
