= Morten Bisgaard =

Danish footballer (born 1974)

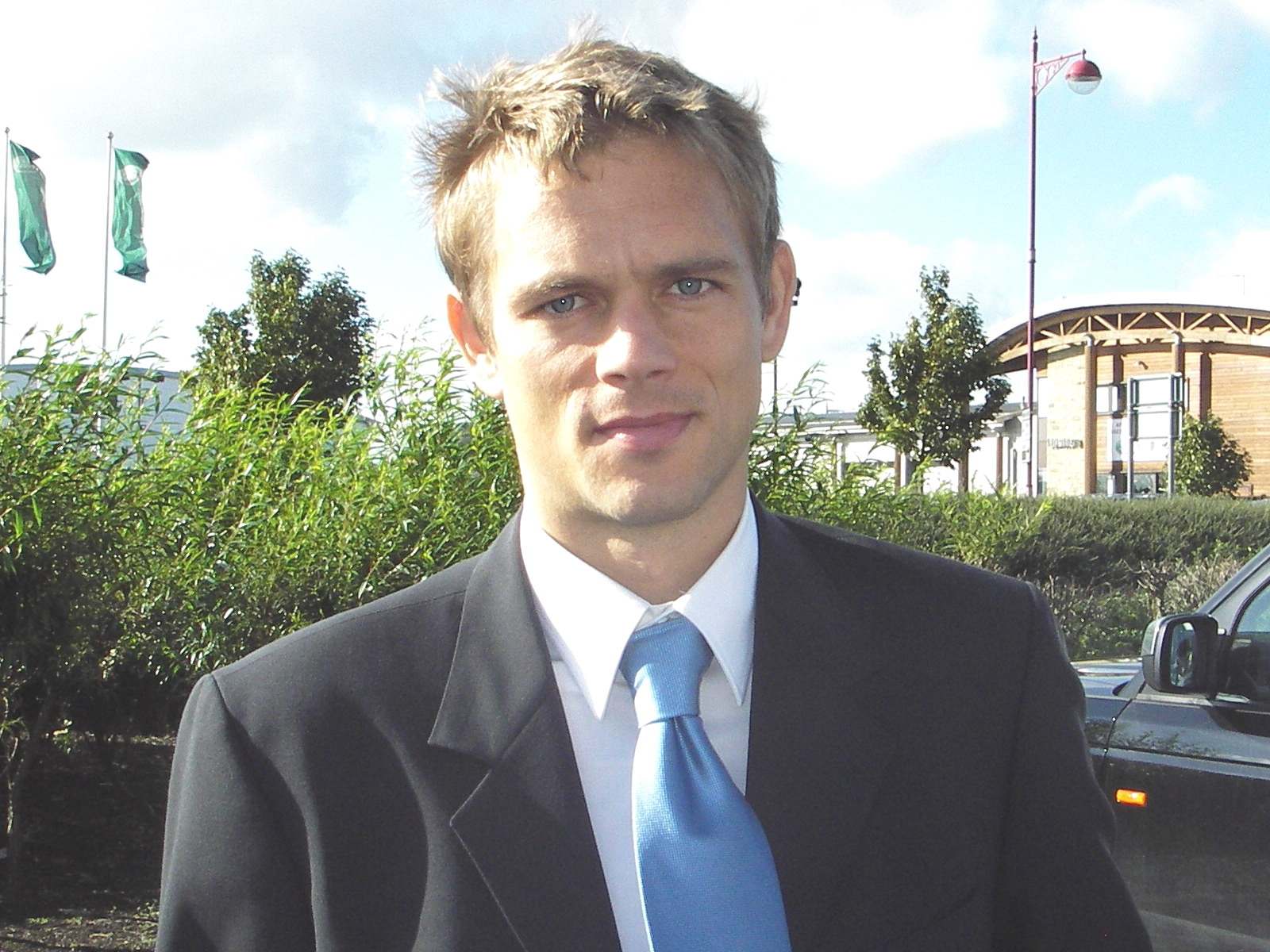
- Bisgaard in 2006

Personal information
- Date of birth: 25 June 1974 (age 52)
- Place of birth: Hadsten, Denmark
- Height: 1.85 m (6 ft 1 in)
- Position: Midfielder

Team information
- Current team: Denmark U/17 (assistant)

Youth career
- Hadsten GF
- Randers Freja

Senior career*
Years	Team	Apps	(Gls)
1991–1992	Randers Freja		
1992–1998	OB	121	(35)
1992	→ Randers Freja (loan)		
1993	→ Viborg FF (loan)		
1998–2001	Udinese Calcio	36	(1)
2001–2004	F.C. Copenhagen	74	(10)
2004–2007	Derby County^{[A]}	101	(10)
2007–2009	OB	24	(1)

International career
1990	Denmark U-17	9	(0)
1990–1993	Denmark U-19	12	(2)
1993–1996	Denmark U-21	8	(0)
1996–2000	Denmark	8	(1)

Managerial career
- 2017–: Denmark U/17 (assistant)
- 2018–: Vejle Boldklub (assistant)
- 2025–: Vejle Boldklub (caretaker)
- * Club domestic league appearances and goals

Morten Bisgaard (born 25 June 1974) is a Danish football coach and former professional player, who played as a midfielder. He played eight games and scored one goal for the Denmark national team, and represented his country at the 2000 European Championship. At club level he played for Randers Freja, OB, Viborg FF and F.C. Copenhagen in Denmark, as well as for Udinese in Italy and Derby County in England. He now works as a commentator and expert on football on the Danish TV channel TV2 Denmark.

== Playing career ==
Born in Hadsten, Bisgaard started playing football with his local club Hadsten Gymnastikforening at the age of 6. He moved to Randers Freja at the age of 12. While playing for Randers Freja, he debuted for the Danish under-19 national team in October 1990, 16 years old. He made his senior debut for Randers Freja in the Danish 2nd Division West during the 1991–92 season. In July 1992, he moved to OB in the top-flight Danish Superliga championship. He stayed another half year with the Randers Freja, while finishing his education. In January 1993, Bisgaard was loaned out to Viborg FF in the Danish 1st Division, and helped the club win promotion for the Superliga in the summer 1993.

Bisgaard started his OB career in the summer 1993. He was a part of the OB team that eliminated multiple European Cup winners Real Madrid from the international 1994–95 UEFA Cup tournament. OB had lost the first match 3–2 at home in Odense. In the second game, Bisgaard came on as a substitute for wingback Steen Nedergaard. 15 seconds before the game ended, Bisgaard scored the final goal in OB's 2–0 win, and secured the club advancement in the tournament. OB was then eliminated by Italian club A.C. Parma in the quarter-finals.

Bisgaard got his national breakthrough in the 1996–97 Superliga season, when he played all 33 league games and scored 16 goals for OB. He was called up to the first Denmark national team match of new national manager Bo Johansson, and Bisgaard made his international debut in the August 1996 game against Sweden. He played an additional national team game in April 1997, before he was sold to Italian club Udinese in the summer 1998. In his first year at Udinese, Bisgaard only played three games in the Italian Serie A championship, and was dropped from the national team. He played 20 games and scored one goal in his second season at Udinese, and was included in the Danish squad for the 2000 European Championship. He played two games at the tournament, both Denmark losses. Bisgaard played a further three national team games, before his national team career ended in October 2000.

He eventually moved back to Denmark, to play for defending Superliga champions F.C. Copenhagen (FCK) in the summer 2001. He helped guide FCK to the 2003 and 2004 Superliga championships, as well as the 2004 Danish Cup trophy. In the summer 2004, he moved to England to play for Derby County in the Football League Championship. In 2005, he lost his regular place in the first team squad. He managed 104 appearances and scored ten goals in his three years at the club, from an attacking midfield position. As his Derby contract expired in the summer 2007, speculation had him joining a Superliga team. Especially Randers FC would be an obvious bid as future employer, as his previous coach Colin Todd will manage them from the summer 2007, but on 23 July 2007, his old club OB signed him on a two-year contract. He left the club in the summer of 2009, and subsequently retired from football.

== Post-playing career ==
Bisgaard started studying journalism at the University of Southern Denmark. He finished his bachelor in January 2013.

=== Oure Fodbold Akademi ===
In 2016, he started working as a football coach at Oure Fodbold Akademi. He was coach for the U19 team playing in the 2 division.

=== Denmark U17 ===
In April 2017 he was appointed the assistant coach of the Danish U17 national team.

== Honours ==
Udinese

- UEFA Intertoto Cup: 2000

FC Copenhagen

- Danish Superliga: 2002–03
- Danish Super Cup: 2001
- Danish Cup: 2003–04
