= Hadsten Grand Prix =

Bicycle race held in Hadsten, Denmark

Race details
- Date: Four days after the Tour de France
- Region: Hadsten, Denmark
- English name: Hadsten Grand Prix
- Local name(s): Det Nye Løb (in Danish)
- Discipline: Road
- Type: Single-day

History
- First edition: 1993
- Editions: 20 (as of 2013)
- First winner: Bjarne Riis (DEN)
- Most wins: Bjarne Riis (DEN) (4 wins)
- Most recent: Lars Bak (DEN)

Hadsten Grand Prix (also known as Det Nye Løb) is a bicycle race held in Hadsten, Denmark. The race has been held annually since 1993 (with cancellations in 2004 and 2009 to 2010).

== Winners ==
Year	Country	Rider	Team
1993	Denmark	Bjarne Riis	Ceramiche Ariostea
1994	Denmark	Bjarne Riis	Gewiss–Ballan
1995	Denmark	Bo Hamburger	TVM
1996	Denmark	Bjarne Riis	Team Telekom
1997	Denmark	Bjarne Riis	Team Telekom
1998	Denmark	Bo Hamburger	Casino–C'est Votre Équipe
1999	Denmark	Martin Krüger	Team Cycling Ringsted
2000	Denmark	Lennie Kristensen	Team Fakta
2001	Denmark	Michael Blaudzun	Team CSC
2002	United States	Tyler Hamilton	Team CSC
2003	Denmark	Jacob Moe Rasmussen	Team Fakta
2004	No race		
2005	Italy	Danilo Di Luca	Liquigas
2006	Luxembourg	Fränk Schleck	Team CSC
2007	Denmark	Matti Breschel	Team CSC
2008	Denmark	Allan Johansen	Team CSC
2009	No race		
2010	No race		
2011	Denmark	Lasse Bøchman	Glud & Marstrand–LRØ
2012	Denmark	Lars Bak	Lotto–Belisol
2013	Denmark	Jakob Fuglsang	Astana Pro Team
