= Frederik Bergmann Larsen =

Danish physician (1839–1916)

- Born: Frederik Ludvig Christian Bergmann Larsen; 12 October 1839; Randers, Denmark
- Died: 19 April 1916 (aged 76); Hadsten, Denmark
- Occupation: Doctor
- Known for: The miracle doctor in Jutland.

Frederik Ludvig Christian Bergmann Larsen (12 October 1839 in Randers – 19 April 1916 in Hadsten), better known as Doctor Larsen, was a famous Danish doctor. In the book, "Jyske byer og deres mænd" [Cities and People from Jutland] from 1917, he is mentioned as "miracle doctor", known by people in the whole Jutland.
