= Hadsten =

- Town
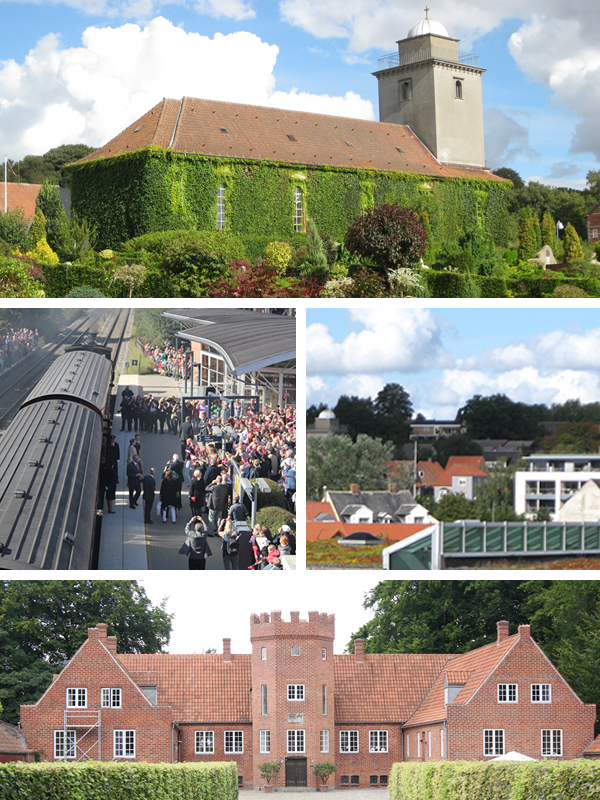
- Motto: "Et hestehoved foran"
- Location in Denmark Hadsten (Central Denmark Region)
- Coordinates: 56°20′00″N 10°03′00″E
- Country: Denmark
- Region: Central Jutland Region
- Municipality: Favrskov Municipality
- Founded: 3 September 1862

Government
  - Type: Municipal council 25 members A (11) C (1) F (1) O (2) V (9) Ø (1)
  - Mayor: Lars Storgaard (C)

Area
  - Total: 5.6 km^{2} (2.2 sq mi)
- Elevation: 18–56 m (59–184 ft)

Population (2026)
  - Total: 8,551
  - Density: 1,500/km^{2} (4,000/sq mi)
  - Gender: 4,182 males and 4,369 females
  - Municipality: 49,773
- Time zone: UTC+1 ([[|CET]])
  - Summer (DST): UTC+2 (CEST)
- Postal code: 8370
- Area code: (+45) 86
- Website: http://www.favrskov.dk/

Hadsten (locally [ˈhæ(ð)ˌste̝ˀn]) is a railway town in central Denmark and, with a population of 8,551 (1 January 2026), the second largest town in Favrskov Municipality after Hinnerup, located in Region Midtjylland in Central Jutland. Until 1 January 2007 it was the site of the municipal council of the now former Hadsten municipality. Other names for Hadsten are: Hadsten Stationsby.

Hadsten has many educational institutions, including a technical school, gymnasium (Secondary school), and folk high school. Hadsten is famous for having one of the largest model railways in Europe. Besides that, Hadsten has the shortest pedestrian street in Europe.

In Denmark, pronunciation of the town's name has often been the subject of confusion, as locals pronounce the name with a silent "d"; as "Ha'sten".

== Etymology ==
Hadsten was mentioned in text for the first time in 1432 as Halstiern, which seems like it comes from the old Danish word tjærn, meaning 'little lake'. The river in Hadsten, Lilleåen, did at the time form a little lake at Kollerup Gods.

When the train station was built, the town of Vinterslev was actually larger, but since the Post Office believe it would cause confusion with the town Vinderslev in Silkeborg Municipality, Hadsten Stationsby was chosen instead.

== History ==
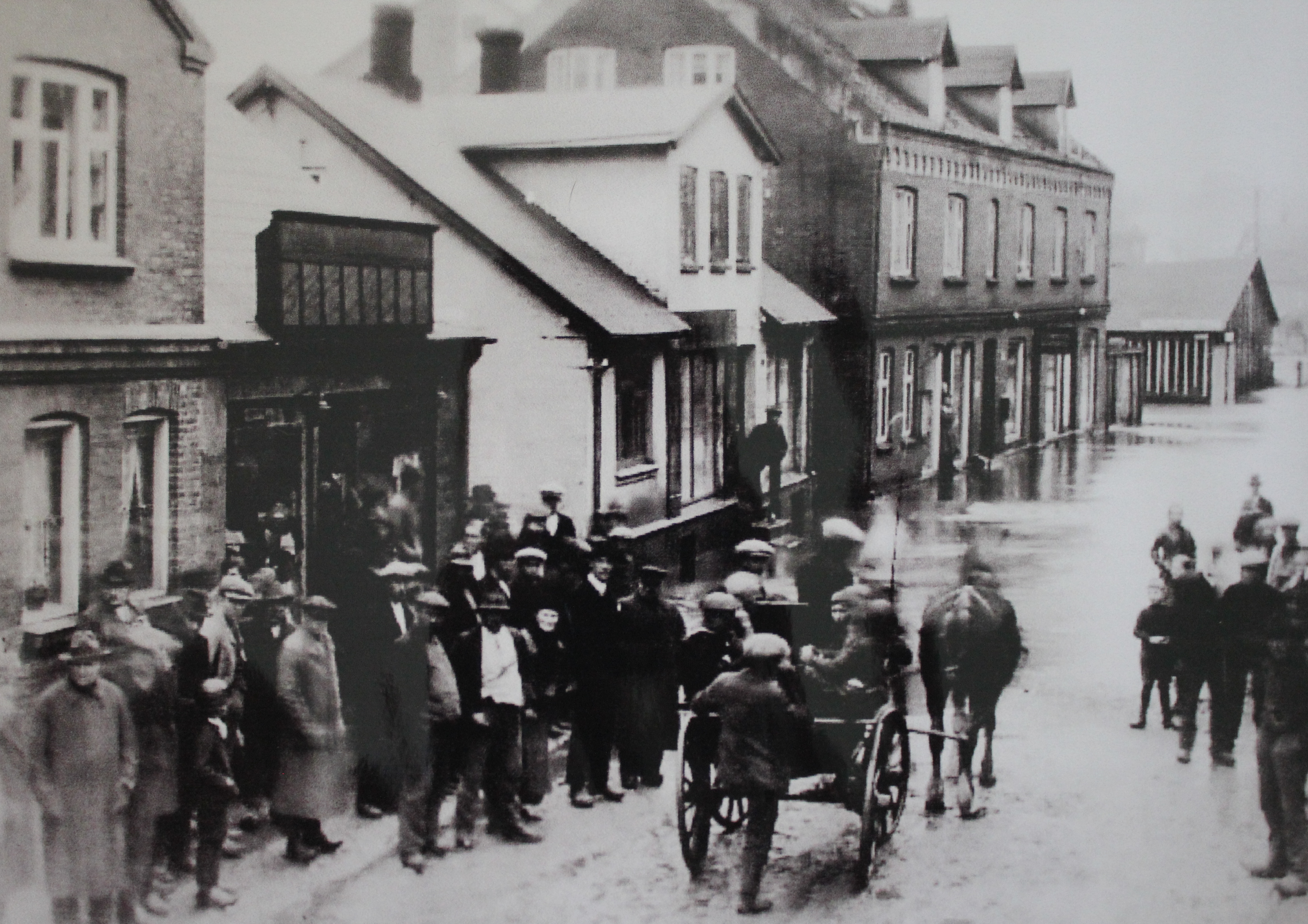
The flooding in 1910 (Søndergade)

Archaeological excavations around the town have shown that people have lived in Lilleådalen as far back as 2,000 BC in the Nordic Stone Age. The excavation at the water mill, which later became known as Hadsten Mølle, have revealed the remains of an even older water mill from around the 1190's in the early High Middle Ages. The present mill originates from the 1400s during the Clausholm Castle era, and later gained its present name of Hadsten Mølle.

Hadsten was mentioned for the first time in 1432 as Halstiern suggesting to come from the Old Norse word tjærn which means "little lake", while the neck also in Old Danish refers to the narrowing the small river valley have of Kollerup Gods. The water level this river at that time has stood 2–3 meters higher than it is today - which is why the valley was marked by lakes.

The modern town was founded on 3 September 1862, when Den østjyske længdebane (The Eastern Jutland Railway) opened. In 2012, the town celebrated its 150th anniversary, with a visit by Frederik, the Crown Prince of Denmark and his wife, Mary, Crown Princess of Denmark. The town was at the plant of the East Jutland stretch of railway line, which was officially inaugurated on 3 September 1862. Therefore, this date is seen as the town's founding. In September 2012 celebrated its 150th anniversary with the visit of Crown Prince Frederik and Crown Princess Mary.

One of the most advanced buildings in Denmark is in Hadsten; it functions as a café, library and auditorium.

== Geography ==
Hadsten’s average elevation above sea level is 44 meters.

== Culture ==
The Hadsten Grand Prix, a bicycle race, has been annually hosted in the city since 1993.

== Urban districts of Hadsten ==
- Hadsten Stationsby, current center of the city.
- Neder- and Over Hadsten, original villages, now integrated into the city.
- Vinterslev, original village, now integrated into the city.

== Notable people ==
- Frederik Bergmann Larsen (1839 – 1916 in Hadsten) a famous Danish doctor, known by some as the miracle doctor
- Sørine Gotfredsen, (Danish Wiki) (born 1967 in Hadsten) Danish priest and journalist
- Morten Bisgaard (born 1974 in Hadsten) a football coach and former football player, over 350 club caps, including over 100 for Derby County F.C. and 8 games and 1 goal for the Denmark
- Maria Fisker Stokholm (born 1990 in Hadsten) a handball player for Viborg HK and the Danish national team
- Jonas Bager (born 1996 in Hadsten) a footballer with 86 club caps with Randers FC

== Gallery ==
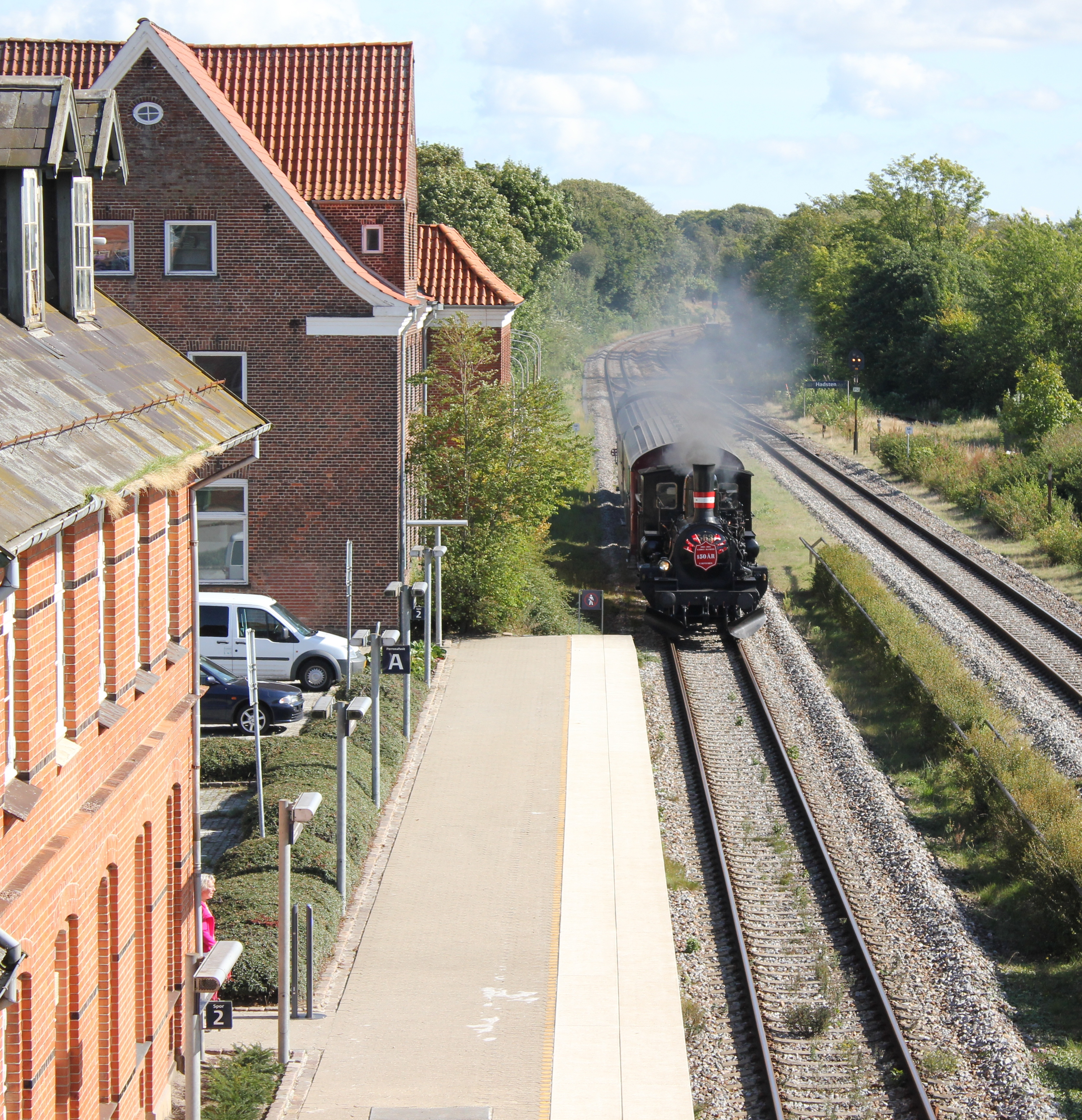
Hadsten Station

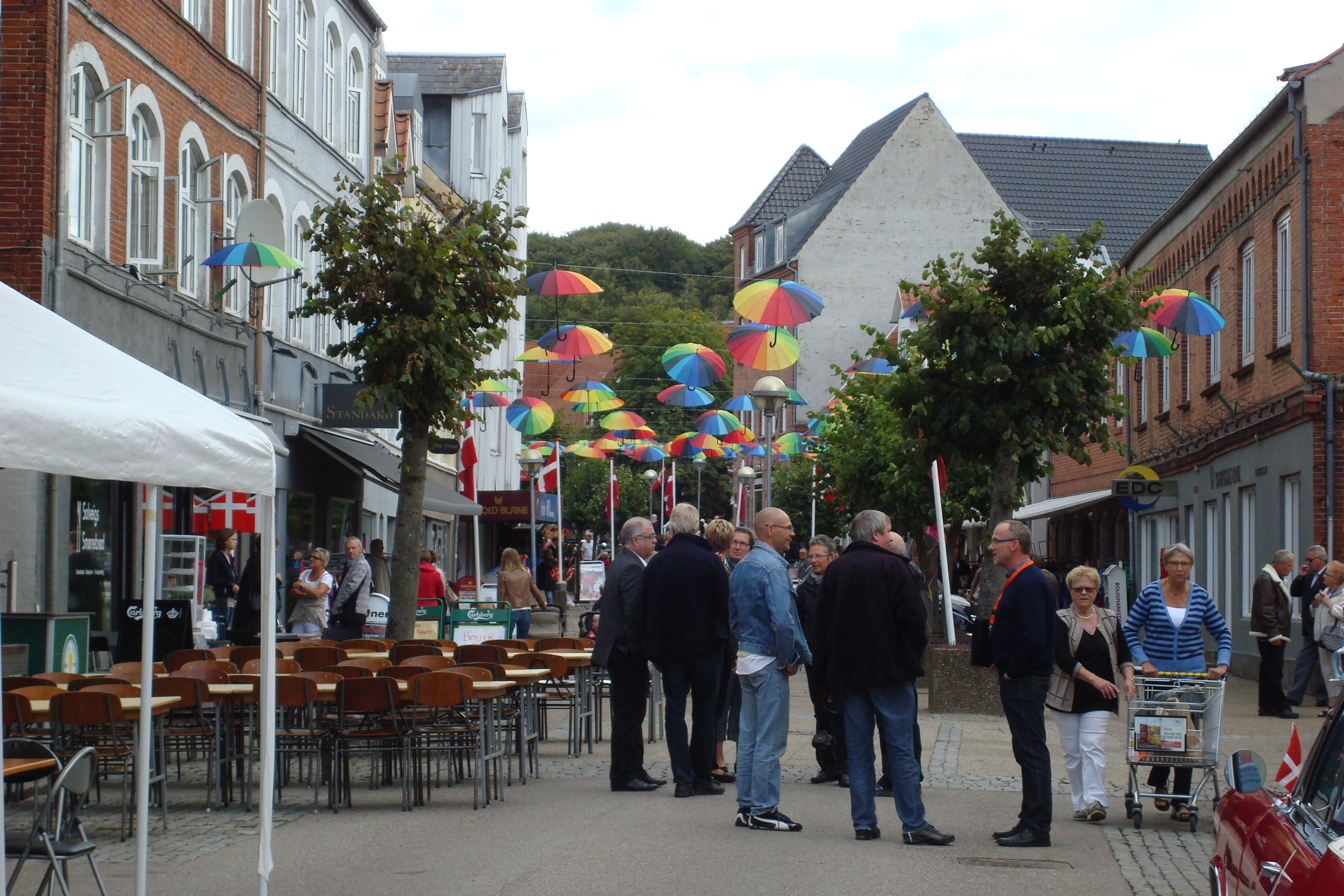
Søndergade

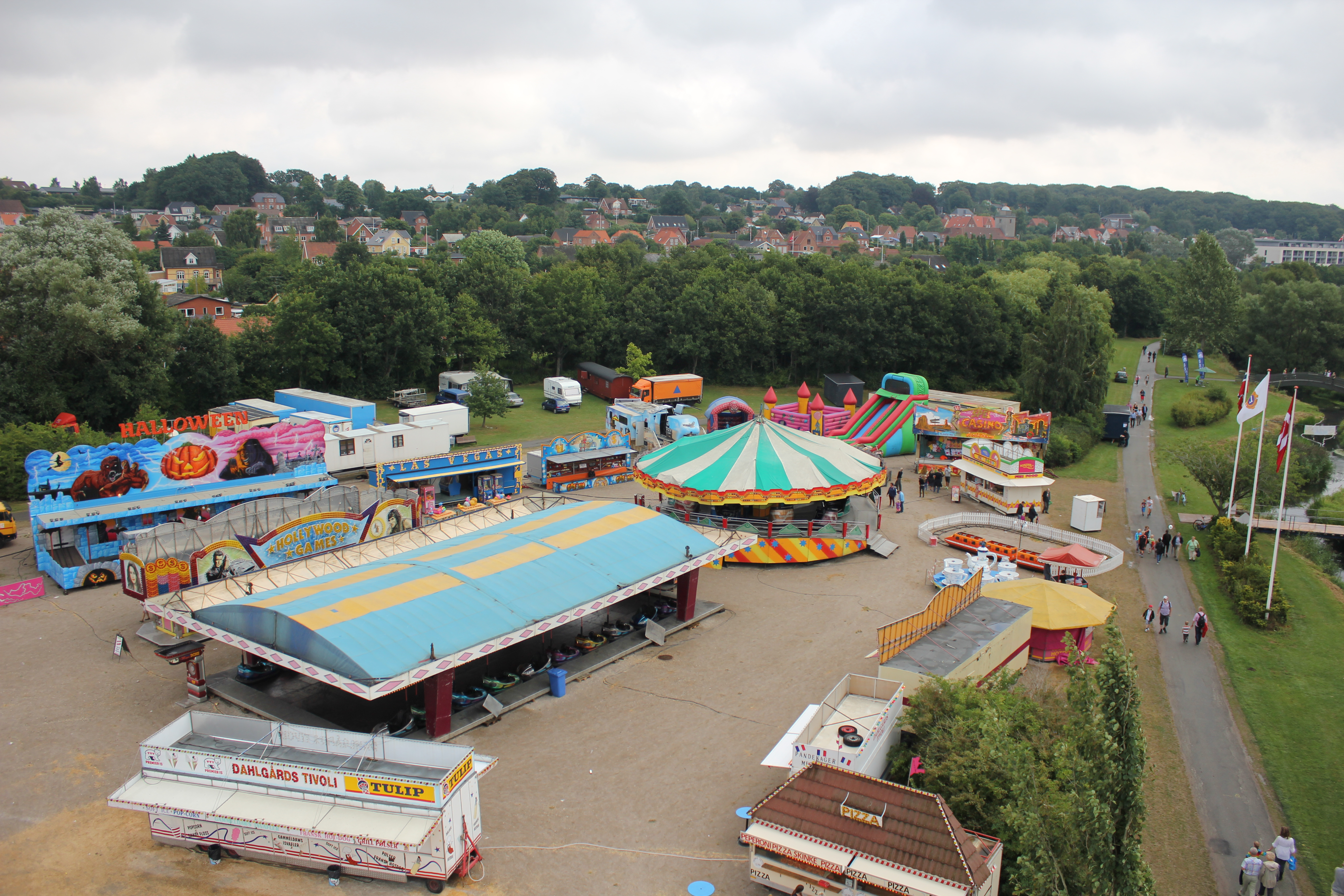
"Lillåmarked", an annual festival and gathering in Lilleå park

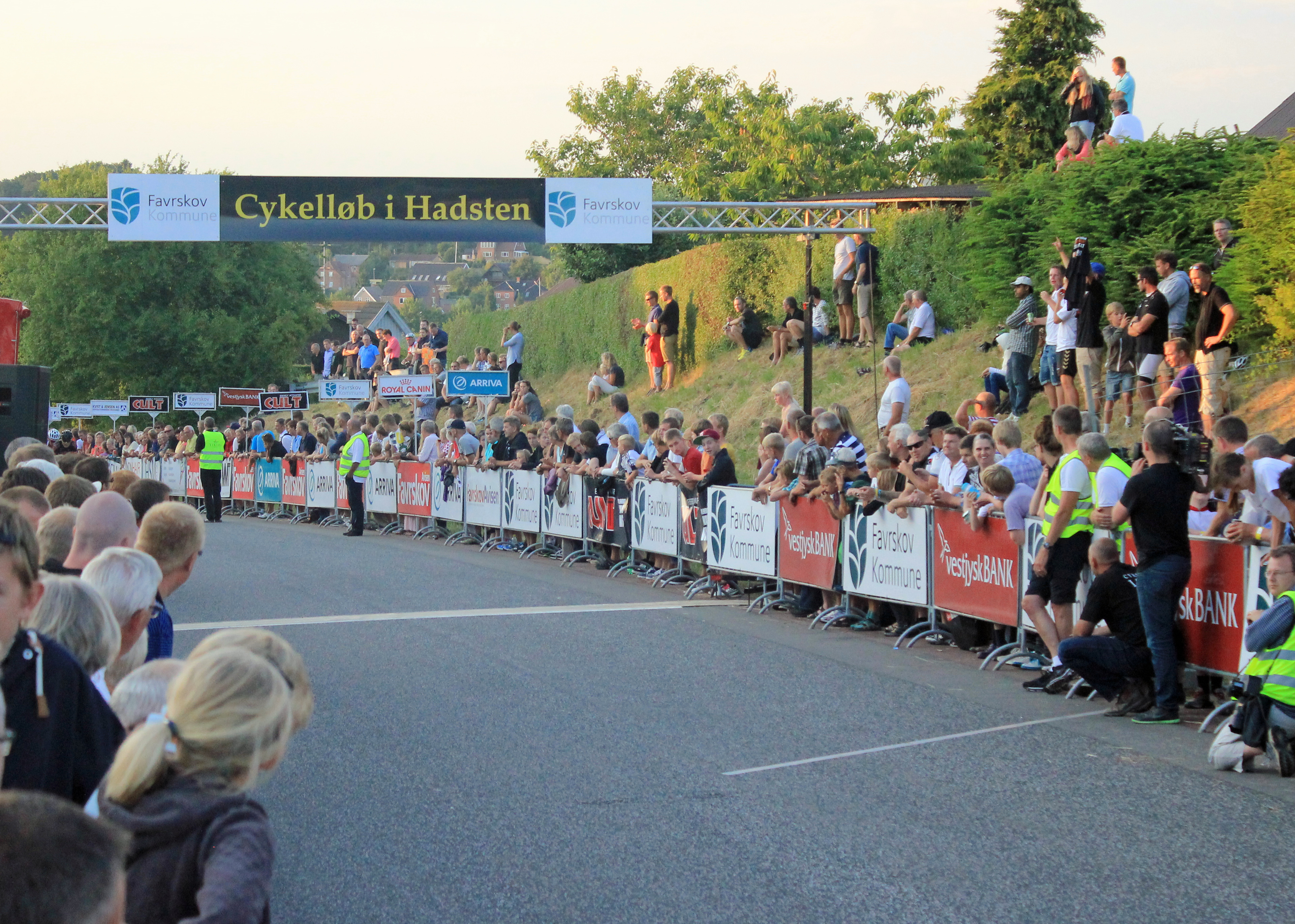
"Det Nye Løb" (The New Race), annual cycling race

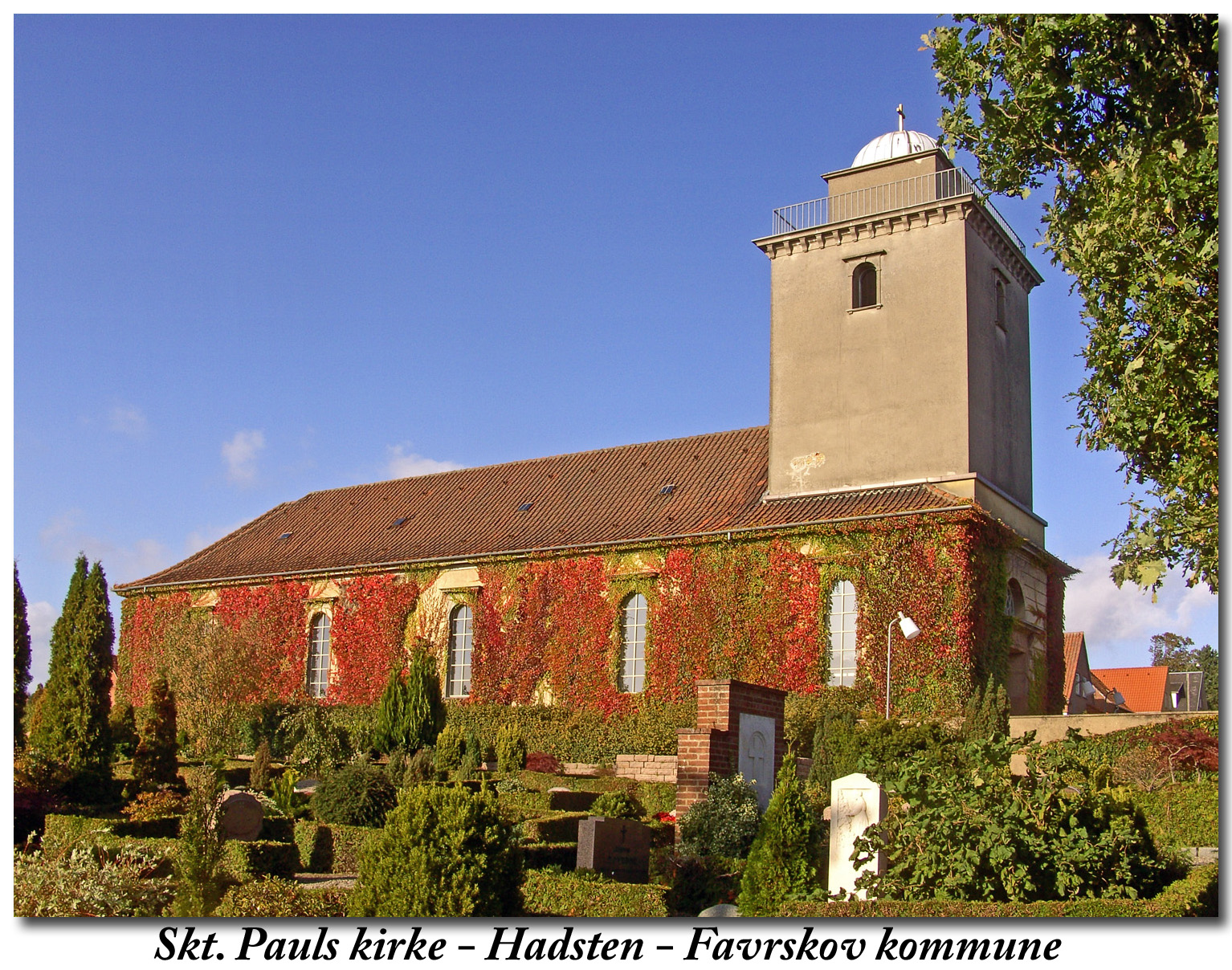
Skt. Pauls kirke

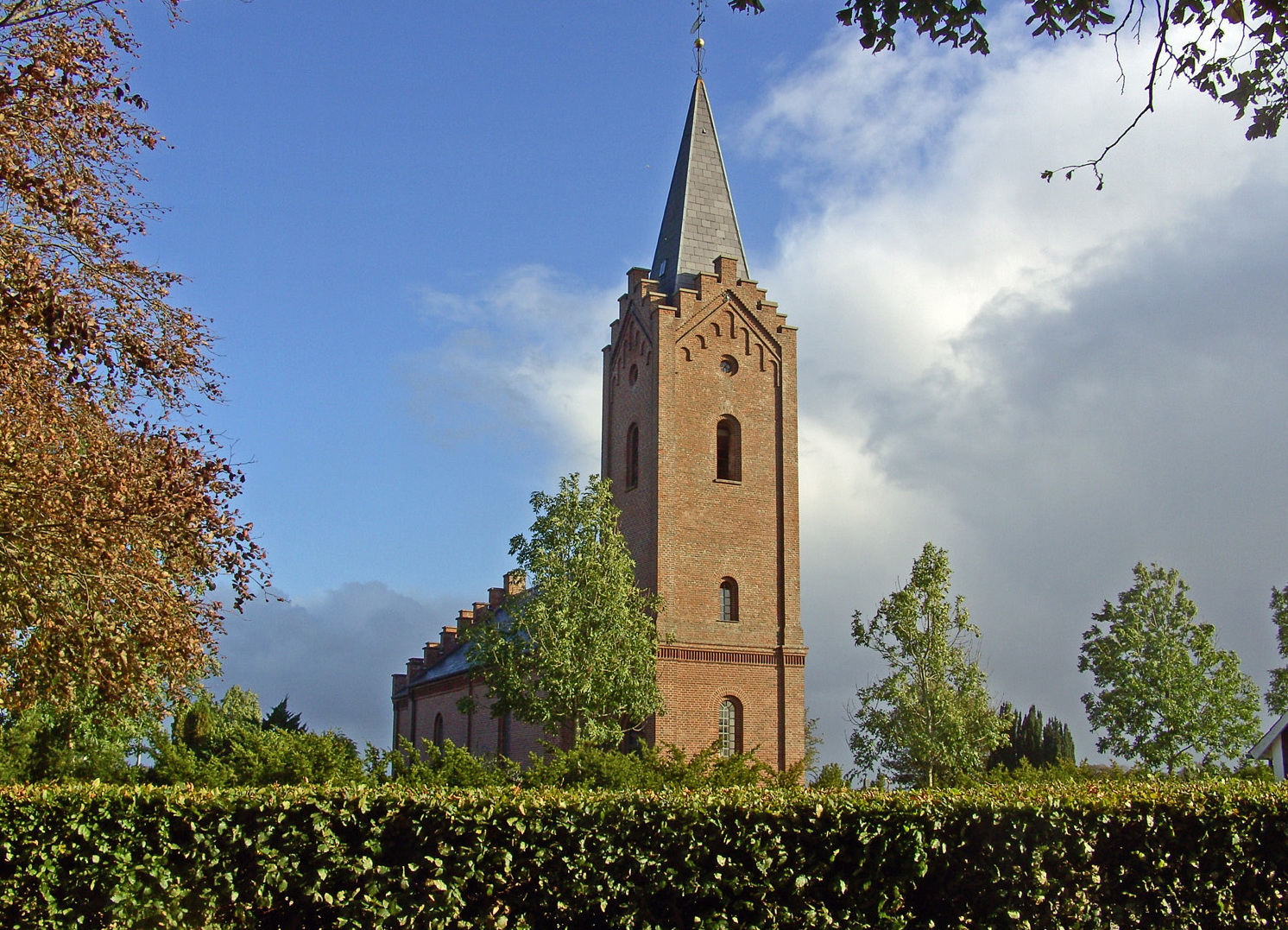
Over Hadsten church

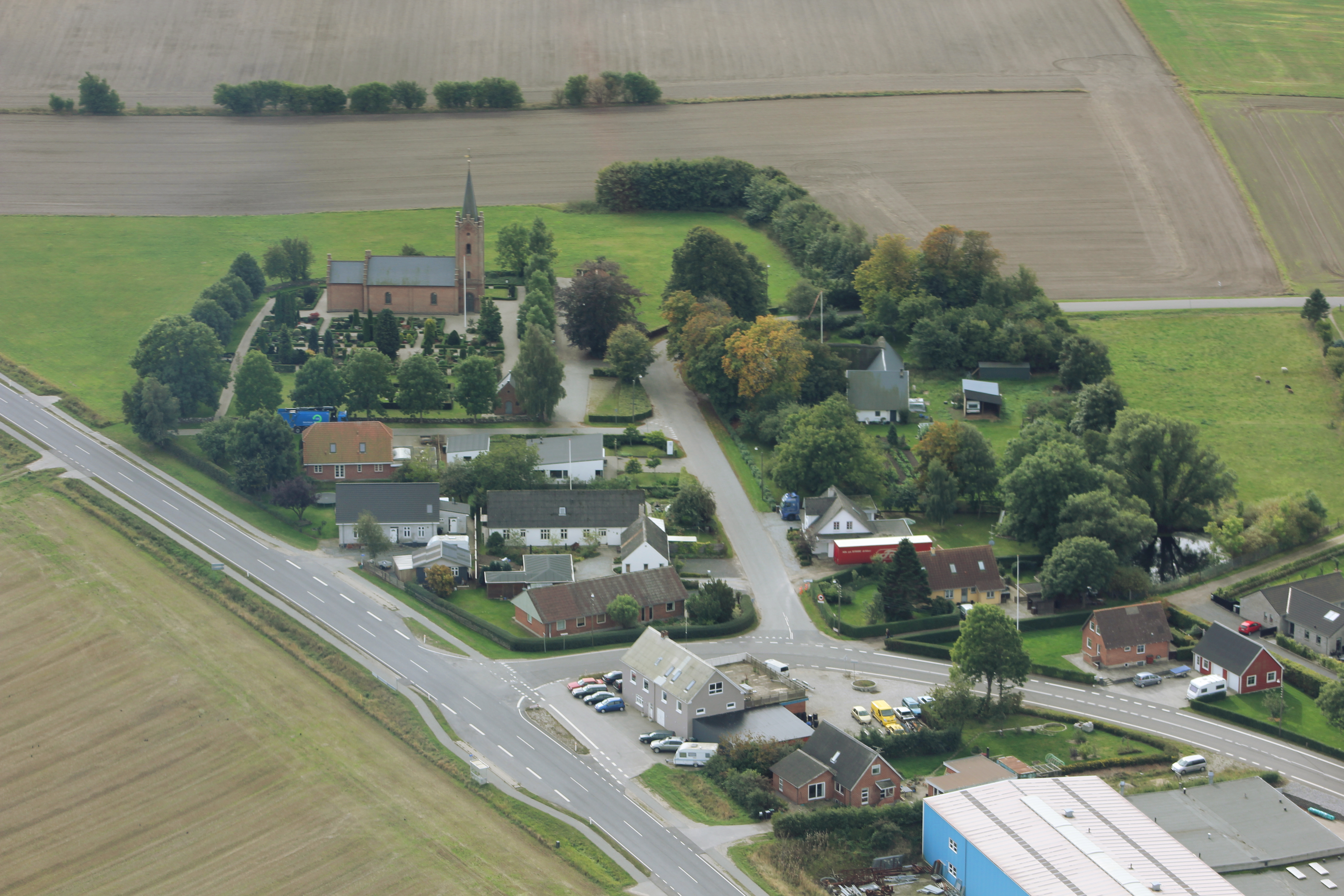
Over Hadsten

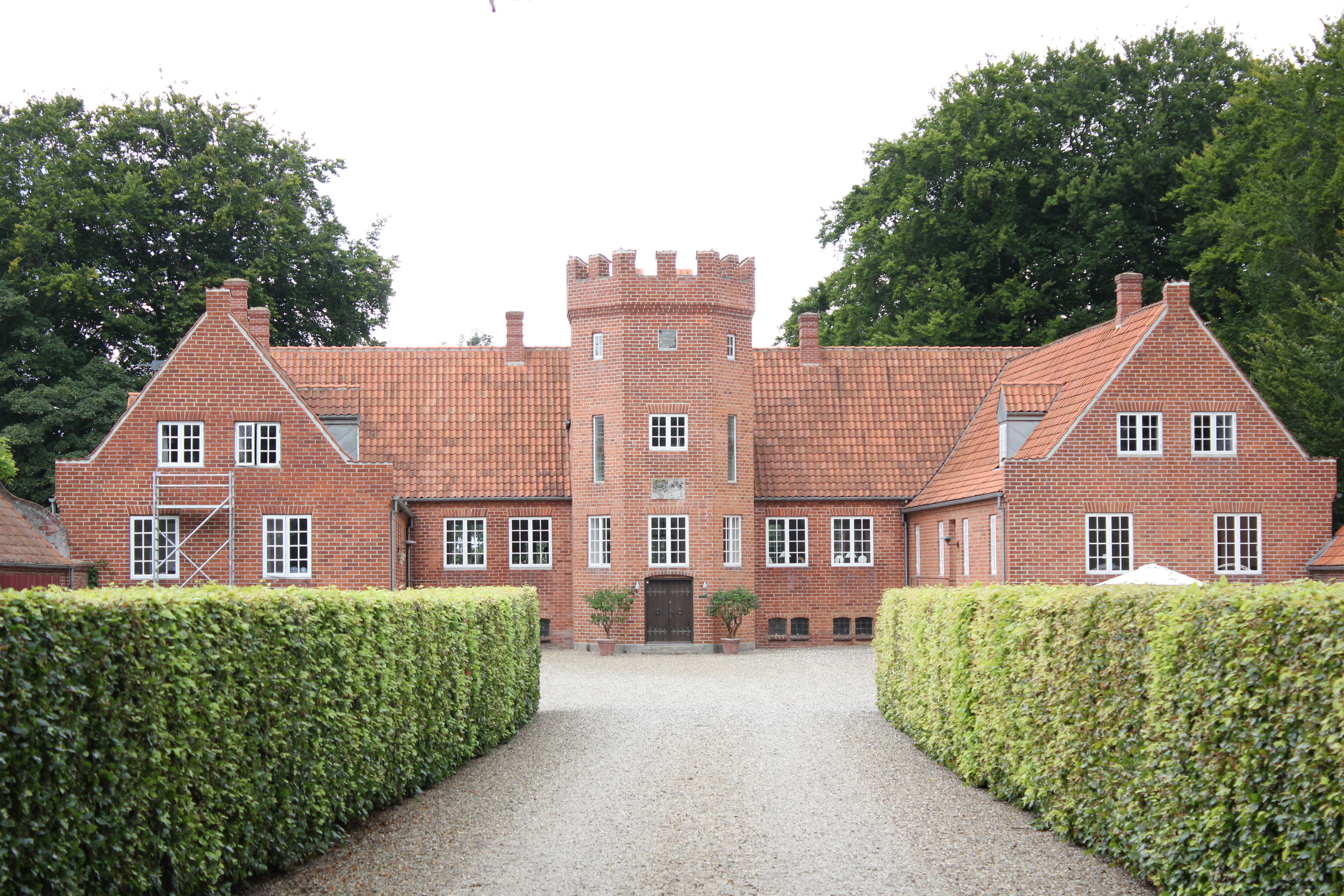
Kollerup Manor

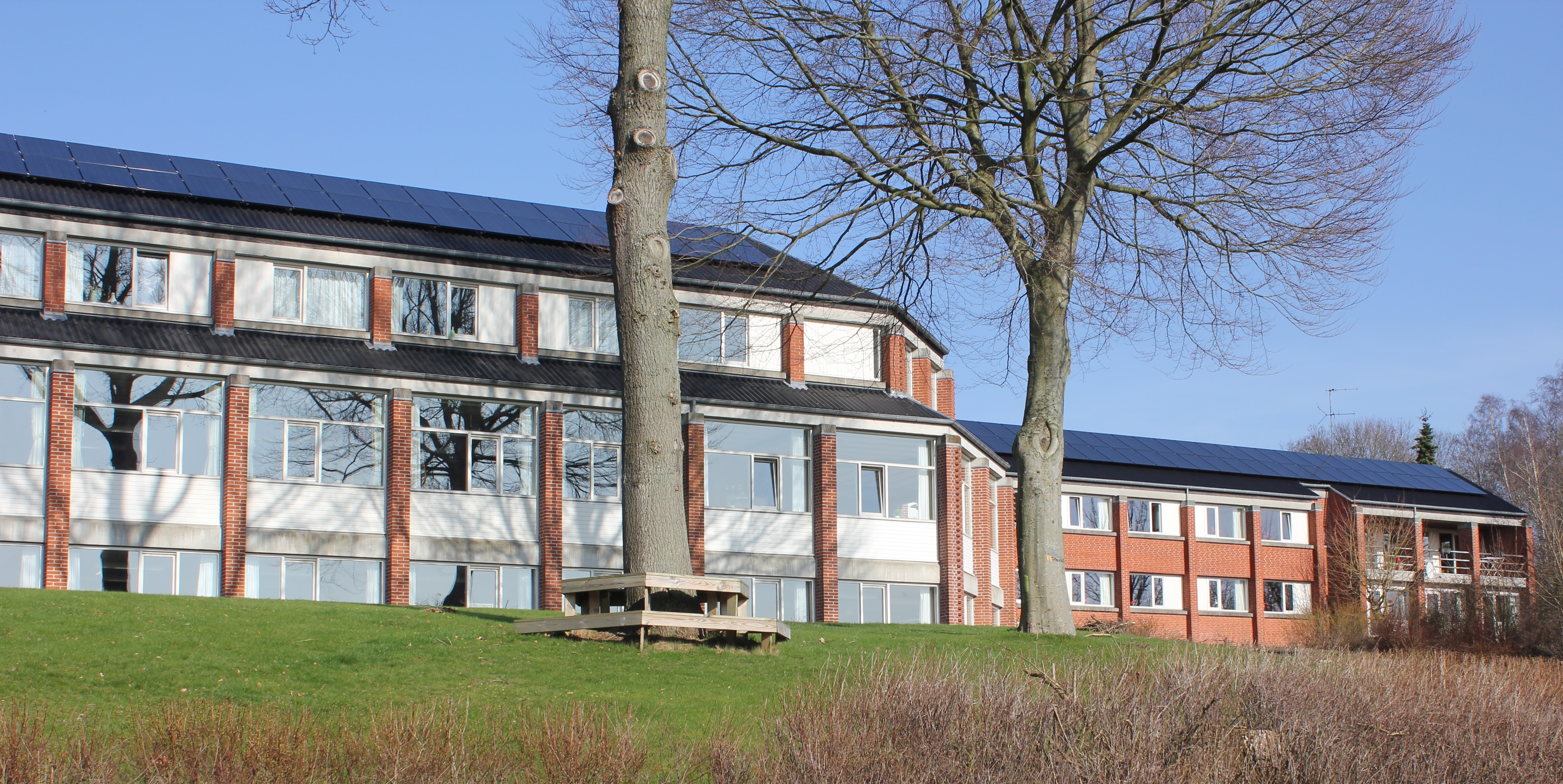
Hadsten Højskole, a folk highschool

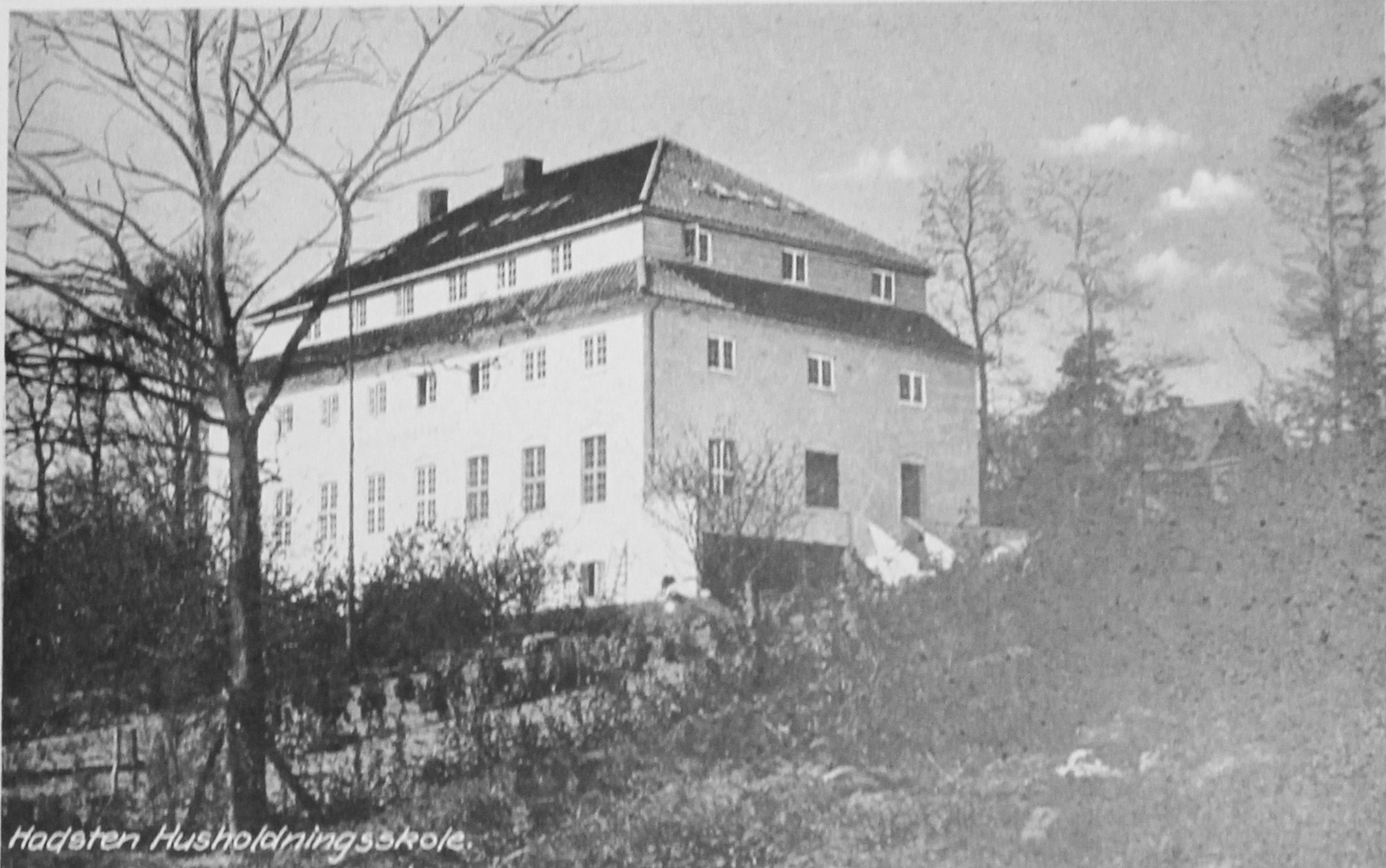
Hadsten Husholdningsskole (1938), originally a school for housekeeping now a vocational school

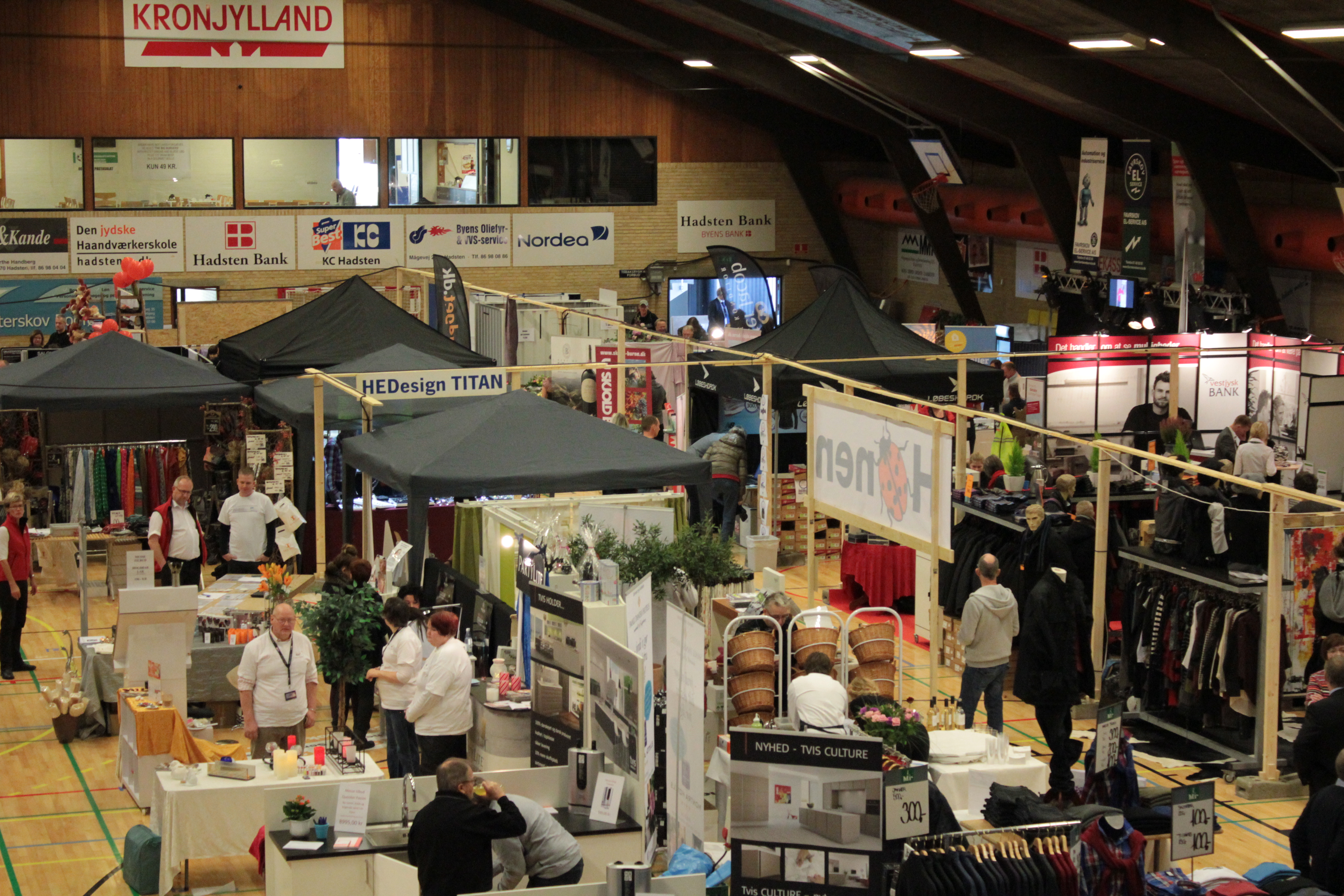
Hadsten Hallen, a fair and exhibition centre

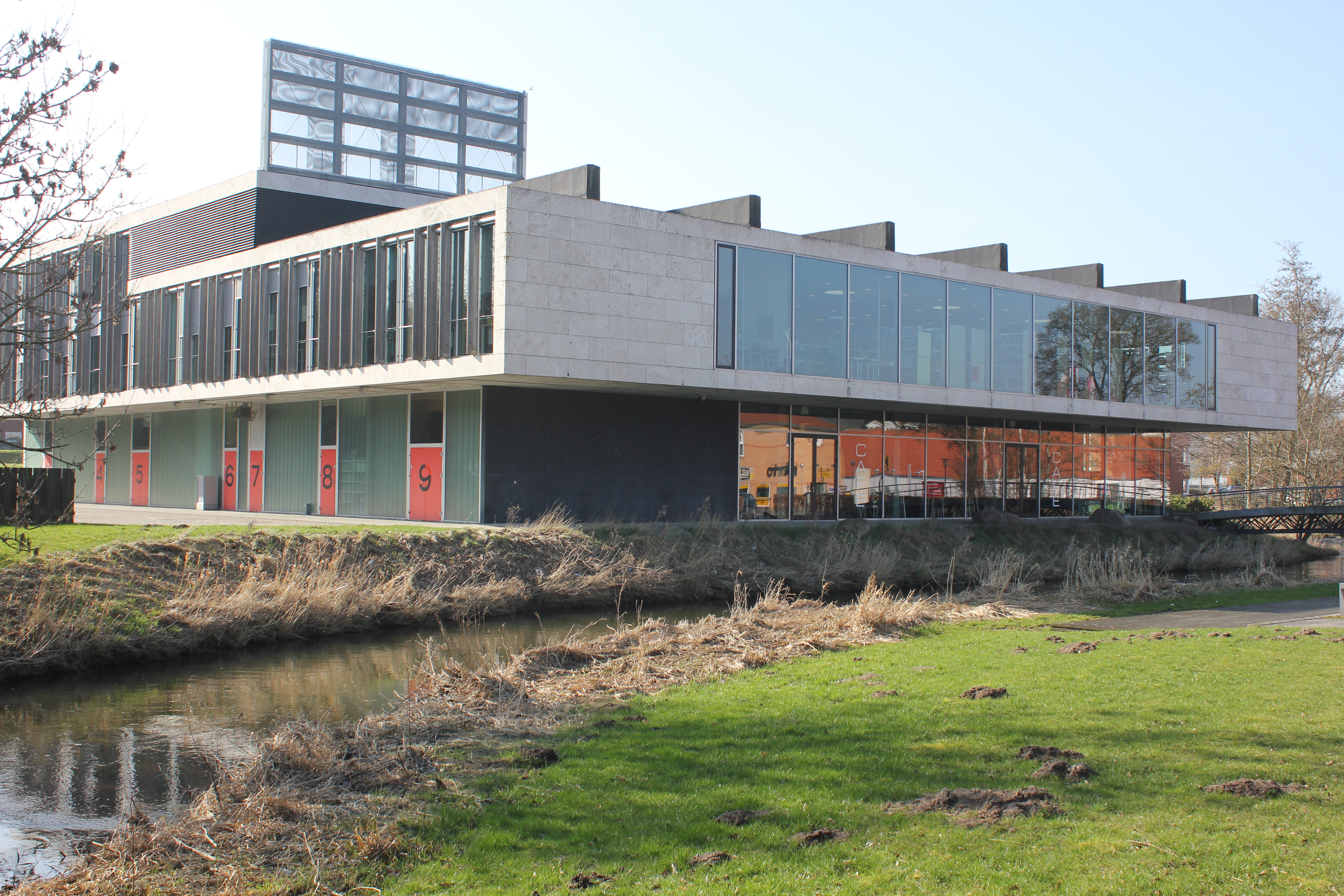
Sløjfen (sports and culture centre)

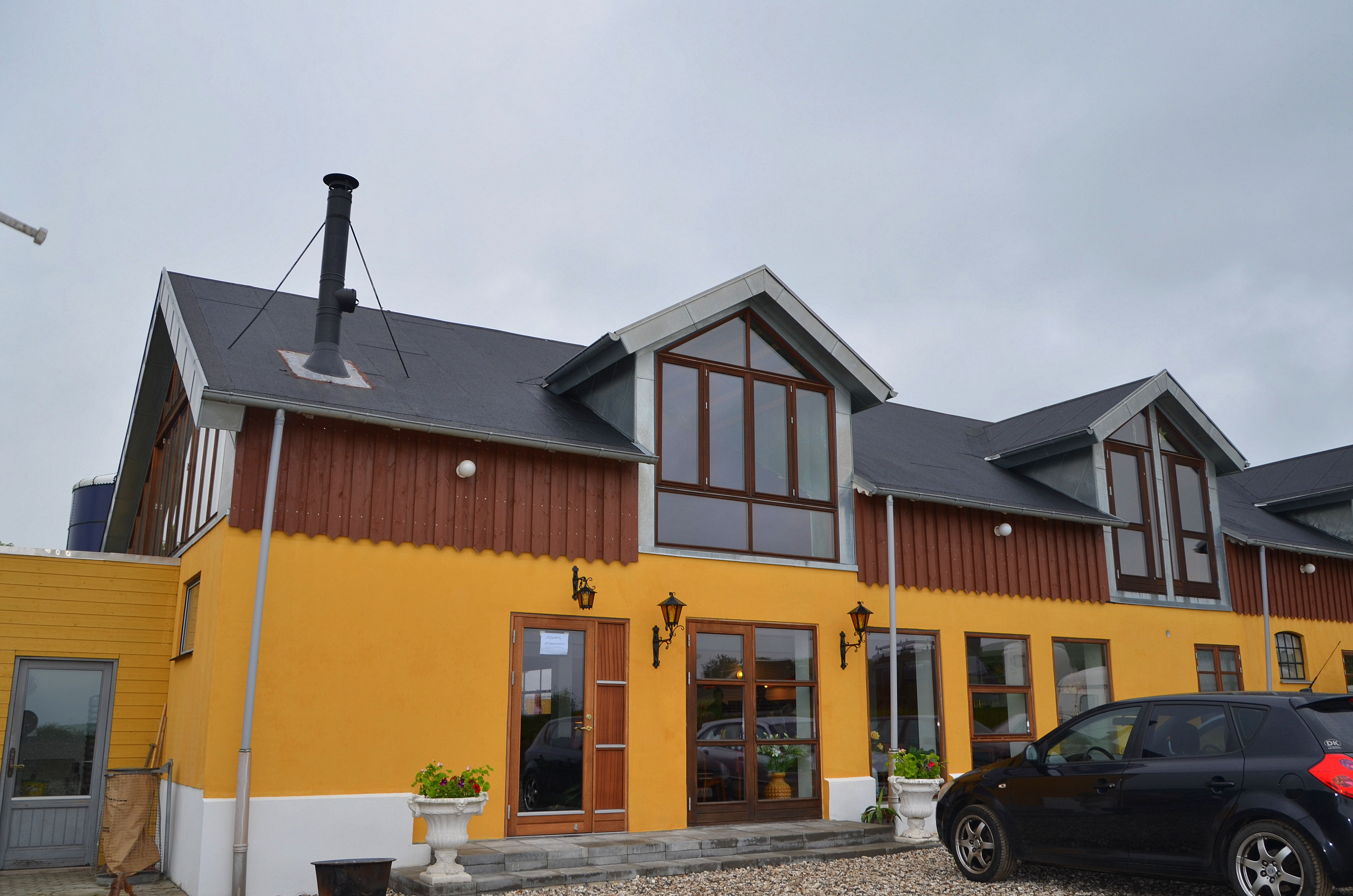
Retro World, a retro Bed & Breakfast themed on the 60s and 70s in Denmark.

== Sister cities ==
Hadsten has one twinned city:

- Saarijärvi, Western Finland, Finland
